= Al Di Meola discography =

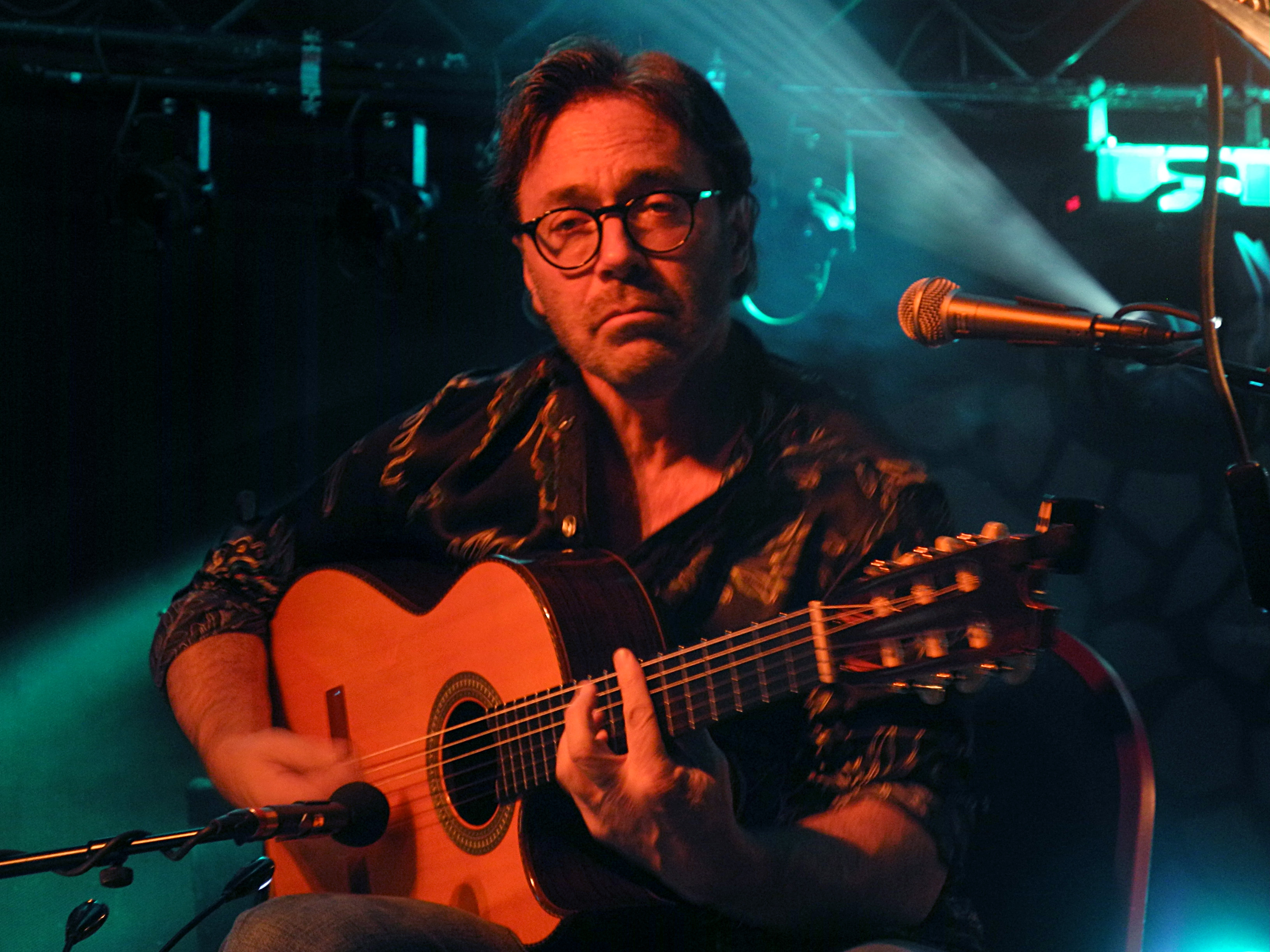
- Studio albums: 26
- Live albums: 7
- Compilation albums: 7
- Singles: 9
- As featured artist: 1
- Collaboration albums: 8

This is a discography of Al Di Meola, an American jazz, jazz fusion, Latin jazz, world music, and world fusion guitarist, composer, and record producer of Italian origin.

== Albums ==
=== Studio albums ===
Title	Album details	Peak chart positions							Certifications
Title	Album details	US	US Jazz	US Cont Jazz	SWE	NLD	NZL	GER	Certifications
Land of the Midnight Sun	Released: October 25, 1976; Label: Columbia; Formats: LP, CD, download	129	13	—	—	20	—	—	
Elegant Gypsy	Released: April 1977; Label: Columbia; Formats: LP, CD, download	58	5	—	40	—	35	—	RIAA: Gold
Casino	Released: February 25, 1978; Label: Columbia; Formats: LP, CD, download	52	5	—	37	—	—	—	
Splendido Hotel	Released: May 10, 1980; Label: Columbia; Formats: LP, CD, download	119	8	—	—	—	—	—	
Electric Rendezvous	Released: 1982; Label: Columbia; Formats: LP, CD, download	55	3	—	26	—	47	57	
Scenario	Released: 1983; Label: Columbia; Formats: LP, CD, download	128	8	—	—	—	—	—	
Cielo e Terra	Released: 1985; Label: Manhattan; Formats: LP, CD	—	18	—	—	—	—	—	
Soaring Through a Dream	Released: 1985; Label: Manhattan; Formats: LP, CD	—	14	—	—	—	—	—	
Tirami Su	Released: 1987; Label: Manhattan; Formats: LP, CD	190	—	14	—	—	—	—	
World Sinfonia	Released: 1991; Label: Tomato; Formats: LP, CD	—	—	10	—	—	—	—	
Kiss My Axe	Released: 1991; Label: Tomato; Formats: LP, CD	—	—	2	—	—	—	—	
World Sinfonia II – Heart of the Immigrants	Released: 1993; Label: Tomato; Formats: CD	—	—	15	—	—	—	—	BVMI: Gold
Orange and Blue	Released: 1994; Label: Tomato; Formats: CD	—	—	17	—	—	—	—	BVMI: Gold
Di Meola Plays Piazzolla	Released:November 5, 1996; Label: Atlantic; Formats: CD, download	—	—	—	—	—	—	—	
The Infinite Desire	Released: August 18, 1998; Label: Telarc; Formats: CD, download	—	—	17	—	—	—	—	BVMI: Gold
Winter Nights	Released: September 1, 1999; Label: Telarc; Formats: CD, download	—	—	15	—	—	—	—	BVMI: Gold
World Sinfonía III - The Grande Passion	Released: October 24, 2000; Label: Telarc; Formats: CD, download	—	—	24	—	—	—	—	BVMI: Gold
Flesh on Flesh	Released: August 27, 2002; Label: Telarc; Formats: CD, download	—	—	25	—	—	—	—	BVMI: Gold
Consequence of Chaos	Released: September 26, 2006; Label: Telarc; Formats: CD, download	—	9	—	—	—	—	—	
Vocal Rendezvous	Released: May 19, 2006; Label: SPV; Formats: CD	—	—	—	—	—	—	—	
Diabolic Inventions and Seduction For Solo Guitar	Released: January 8, 2007; Label: Di Meola Productions; Formats: CD, download	—	—	—	—	—	—	—	
Pursuit of Radical Rhapsody	Released: March 15, 2011; Label: Concord; Formats: CD, download	—	4	—	—	—	—	—	
All Your Life (A Tribute to the Beatles)	Released: September 10, 2013; Label: Valiana/Songsurfer; Formats: LP, CD, download	—	16	—	—	—	—	—	BVMI: Gold
Elysium	Released: May 22, 2015; Label: in-akusitik; Formats: LP, CD, download, streaming	—	—	—	—	—	—	—	
Opus	Released: February 23, 2018; Label: earMUSIC; Formats: LP, CD, download, streaming	—	—	—	—	—	—	80	
Across the Universe	Released: March 13, 2020; Label: earMUSIC; Formats: LP, CD, download, streaming	—	—	—	—	—	—	36	
Twentyfour	Release: July 19, 2024; Label: earMUSIC; Format: LP, CD, download, streaming	TBA							
"—" denotes a recording that did not chart or was not released in that territory.

=== with Return to Forever ===
Title	Album details
Where Have I Known You Before	Released: 1974; Label: Polydor; Format: Vinyl, CD
No Mystery	Released: 1975; Label: Polydor; Format: Vinyl, CD
Romantic Warrior	Released: 1976; Label: Columbia; Format: Vinyl, CD
Returns	Released: March 17, 2009; Label: Eagle; Format: CD, download

=== Collaborations ===
Title	Album details	Peak chart positions							
Title	Album details	US	US Jazz	US Cont Jazz	GER	NLD	AUT	NZL	FRA
Friday Night in San Francisco (Paco de Lucía, John McLaughlin, and Al Di Meola)	Released: August 10, 1981; Label: Philips; Formats: LP, CD, CS, download	97	6	—	22	66	5	48	154
Passion, Grace and Fire (Paco de Lucía, John McLaughlin, and Al Di Meola)	Released: March 23, 1983; Label: Philips; Formats: LP, CD, SACD, CS, download	171	9	—	35	—	—	—	—
The Rite of Strings (Stanley Clarke, Jean-Luc Ponty, and Al Di Meola)	Released: July 17, 1995; Label: Gai Saber; Formats: CD	—	—	4	—	—	—	—	—
The Guitar Trio (Paco de Lucía, John McLaughlin, and Al Di Meola)	Released: October 15, 1996; Label: Verve; Formats: LP, CD, CS, download	—	1	—	55	—	27	—	21
Cosmopolitan Life (Leonid Agutin and Al Di Meola)	Released: May 23, 2005; Label: Ole Records; Formats: CD	—	—	—	57	—	—	—	—
Midsummer Night in Sardinia (Andrea Parodi and Al Di Meola)	Released: February 16, 2007; Label: ZYX Music; Formats: CD	—	—	—	—	—	—	—	—
The NYC Session: Beautiful Love (Eddie Gómez, Billy Drummond, Yutaka Kobayashi, and Al Di Meola)	Released: April 1, 2008; Label: Isol Discus; Formats: CD, download	—	—	—	—	—	—	—	—
He & Carmen (Eszter Horgas and Al Di Meola)	Released: 2008; Label: Galaxy Music Ltd./Danubius Music; Formats: CD, download	—	—	—	—	—	—	—	—
"—" denotes a recording that did not chart or was not released in that territory.

=== Live albums ===
Title	Album details	Peak chart positions	
Title	Album details	US	US Jazz
Tour De Force – Live	Released: September 27, 1982; Label: Columbia; Formats: CD, download	165	8
Live in London	Released: May 16, 2007; Label: Di Meola Productions; Formats: CD, download	—	—
Melodia Live in Milano	Released: March 20, 2008; Label: Valiana; Formats: CD, download	—	—
World Sinfonia: Live from Seattle and Elsewhere	Released: 2009; Label: Valiana; Formats: CD	—	—
Live at the North Sea Jazz Festival	Released: April 10, 2012; Label: The Store For Music; Formats: CD	—	—
Morocco Fantasia	Released: 2017; Label: Inakustik; Formats: CD	—	—
Elegant Gypsy & More	Released: 2018; Label: earMUSIC; Formats: CD	—	—
"—" denotes a recording that did not chart or was not released in that territory.

=== Compilation albums ===
Title	Details
Greatest Hits	Released: November 1, 1990; Label: Sony Music; Format: CD
The Best of Al Di Meola: The Manhattan Years	Released: 1992; Label: Blue Note; Format: CD
The Essence of Al Di Meola	Released: 1994; Label: Sony Music; Format: CD
This Is Jazz	Released: 1997; Label: Sony Music; Format: CD
Anthology	Released: October 22, 2000; Label: Sony Music; Format: CD
Al Di Meola Collection	Released: January 1, 2014; Label: Concord; Format: CD, download
Elysium	Released: June 8, 2015; Label: Valiana Music and Media; Format: CD, download, streaming

== Video albums ==
Title	Video details
The Super Guitar Trio and Friends (with Larry Coryell and Bireli Lagrene)	Released: 1990; Label: Pioneer, TDK; Formats: Laserdisc, DVD
Live at Montreux 1986/1993	Released: 16 November 2004; Label: Montreux Sounds/Eagle Vision; Formats: DVD
Live at Montreux 1994 (with Stanley Clarke and Jean-Luc Ponty)	Released: 3 May 2005; Label: Eagle Eye Media/Montreux Sounds; Formats: DVD
One of These Nights (with Ernie Adams, Gumbi Ortiz, Mario Parmisano, and Sturcz String Quartet)	Released: 1 February 2005; Label: In-Akustik; Formats: DVD
Speak a Volcano: Return to Electric Guitar	Released: 30 October 2007; Label: In-Akustik; Formats: DVD
Super Guitar Trio: Live at Montreux /1989 (with Larry Coryell and Bireli Lagrene)	Released: 7 August 2007; Label: Eagle Rock; Formats: DVD
Cosmopolitan Live (with Leonid Agutin)	Released: 4 March 2008; Label: Ole Records; Formats: DVD
Return to Forever: Returns – Live at Montreux (with Stanley Clarke, Chick Corea and Lenny White)	Released: 12 May 2009; Label: Eagle Rock; Formats: DVD, Blu-ray
Live in Tokyo (with The Sturcz String Quartet)	Released: 7 December 2010; Label: IMV; Formats: DVD
Live at North Sea Jazz Festival	Released: 19 October 2010; Label: The Store For Music; Formats: DVD
One Night in Montreal	Released: 18 May 2010; Label: Immortal Eur/Zoom; Formats: DVD
Carmen	Released: 13 June 2011; Label: The Store For Music; Formats: DVD
Morocco Fantasia	Released: 5 December 2011; Label: In-Akustik; Formats: DVD, Blu-ray

== Singles ==
=== As lead artist ===
Title	Year	Album
"Milonga Noctiva" (featuring Kemuel Roig)	2017	Opus
"Broken Heart"	2018	Opus
"Ava's Dream Sequence Lullaby"	2018	Opus
"Strawberry Fields Forever"	2020	Across the Universe
"One Sky"	2020	Non-album single
"Magic Song (Carol of the Bells / Shchedryk)" (Leonid Agutin, Amaury Gutiérrez, and Al Di Meola featuring Ed Cale, Angelica Varum, and Zhangjiajie Philharmonic Orchestra)	2021	Non-album single
"Chelsea Hotel No. 2 (Sliverpark with Al Di Meola)	2022	Endless Sleep
"Fandango"	2024	Twentyfour
"For Only You"	2024	Twentyfour
"Ava's Dance in the Moonlight"	2024	Twentyfour

=== As featured artist ===
Title	Year	Album
"The Cruelest Goodbye" (Outlanders featuring Al Di Meola)	2022	Non-album single

== Other appearances ==
Year	Notes	Album	Ref
1975	electric guitar in "Prince of the Sea"	Venusian Summer - Lenny White	
1976	guitar solo in "Man of Leo", "Stellar", "Carnival", "Ghost Machine" and "Time is Here"	Go - Stomu Yamashta, Steve Winwood and Michael Shrieve	
1976	guitar	Go Live from Paris - Stomu Yamashta's Go	
1977	guitar	Go Too - Stomu Yamashta's Go	
1982	guitar in "Compadres"	Touchstone - Chick Corea	
1984	guitar solo in "Allergies"	Hearts and Bones - Paul Simon	
1988	acoustic guitar in "The Way In", and "Sledgehammer"	The Way In - Jeff Richman	
1988	guitar	Latin - George Dalaras	
1993	electric guitar solos in "Tangos" and "Buleria"	Jazzpana - Vince Mendoza and Arif Mardin	
1995	guitar	David Broza - David Broza	
1995	acoustic guitar	Dance of Fire - Aziza Mustafa Zadeh	
1995	producer	Magic Touch - Stanley Jordan	
1996	acoustic guitar trio with McLaughlin and de Lucia in "El Ciego"	The Promise - John McLaughlin	
1996	guitar in "Mediterranean Sundance"	Pavarotti & Friends For War Child - Luciano Pavarotti	
1997	guitar	People in Room No 8 - Leslie Mándoki	
1999	guitar	Crossing the Bridge - Eileen Ivers	
2000	acoustic guitar	Inspiration – Colors & Reflections - Aziza Mustafa Zadeh	
2001	guitar in "Beyond the Mirage, for 2 guitars", "Azzurra, for 2 guitars" and "The Grand Passion, for 2 guitars"	Nylon & Steel - Manuel Barrueco	
2001	acoustic guitar	The Running Roads - George Dalaras	
2002	guitar in "Torbellino (Whirlwind)"	Camino Latino - Liona Boyd	
2002	guitar	Don't Let Me Be Misunderstood - No Mercy	
2002	guitar	Soulmates - Leslie Mándoki	
2003	acoustic guitar in "The Sons of Anu" and "Gypsy Moth"	Black Utopia - Derek Sherinian	
2003	guitar in "Sinej Reki Voda"	Deja Vu - Leonid Agutin	
