= Flesh on Flesh =

Studio album by Al Di Meola
- Released: 27 August 2002
- Recorded: March – April 2002
- Studio: The Hit Factory Criteria (North Miami, Florida): Cintron Studios (Miami Beach, Florida)
- Genre: Jazz
- Length: 50:50
- Label: Telarc
- Producer: Al Di Meola

Al Di Meola chronology
World Sinfonía III - The Grande Passion (2000)	Flesh on Flesh (2002)	Consequence of Chaos (2006)

Professional ratings
Review scores
Source	Rating
AllMusic	4/5 stars
All About Jazz	(positive)

Flesh on Flesh is a 2002 album by Italian-American jazz fusion and Latin jazz guitarist Al Di Meola. The album contains new compositions and reworkings of older ones as well.

== Track listing ==
All songs by Al Di Meola unless otherwise noted.

1. "Zona Desperata" – 9:23
2. "Innamorata" – 8:38
3. "Meninas" (Egberto Gismonti) – 5:41
4. "Flesh on Flesh" – 5:57
5. "Fugata" (Ástor Piazzolla) – 5:46
6. "Deep and Madly" – 1:45
7. "Saffire Soleil" – 4:11
8. "Señor Mouse" (Chick Corea) – 9:24

== Personnel ==
- Al Di Meola – acoustic guitars (1–5, 7, 8), electric-acoustic guitars (1, 2, 4–7), Roland VG-88 (1, 2, 4–7), bombo legüero (1, 2), dumbek (2, 5), klong khaek (2), tarbuka (2), timpani (2), acoustic-electric guitars (4, 6), cymbals (4), drum programming (6), electric guitar (7, 8), drums (8)
- Gonzalo Rubalcaba – Fender Rhodes (1, 5), Rhodes solo (1)
- Mario Parmisano – acoustic piano (1–5, 7, 8), synthesizers (1, 2, 4, 5), marimba (1), arrangements (3), calliope (4)
- Anthony Jackson – electric contrabass (1, 2, 4, 5, 7, 8), electric bass (3)
- Ernie Adams – drums (2, 7)
- Gumbi Ortiz – percussion (1), congas (1, 2, 4, 5), cajón (2, 4, 5)
- Alejandro Santos – flutes (1, 2, 4, 5, 7), pan pipes (2), bass flute (3)
- Guillermo Ruiz – alto saxophone (1)
- Jeans Valdés Labrada – alto saxophone (1)
- Williams Polledo – trumpet (1)

=== Production ===
- Robert Woods – executive producer
- Al Di Meola – producer, arrangements
- Roger Nichols – basic track engineer, mastering
- Michael Renna – engineer (6)
- Mark Lee – assistant engineer, additional engineer
- Dan O'Brien – second assistant engineer, studio coordinator
- German Ortiz – overdub engineer, mixing
- Marty Clinton III – assistant overdub engineer, mix assistant
- Anilda Carrasquillo – art direction, design
- Superstock – cover photography
- Peter Zander – back cover photography

== Charts ==
Year	Chart	Position
2002	Billboard Top Contemporary Jazz Albums	25
