= Gumbi Ortiz =

American musician and percussionist

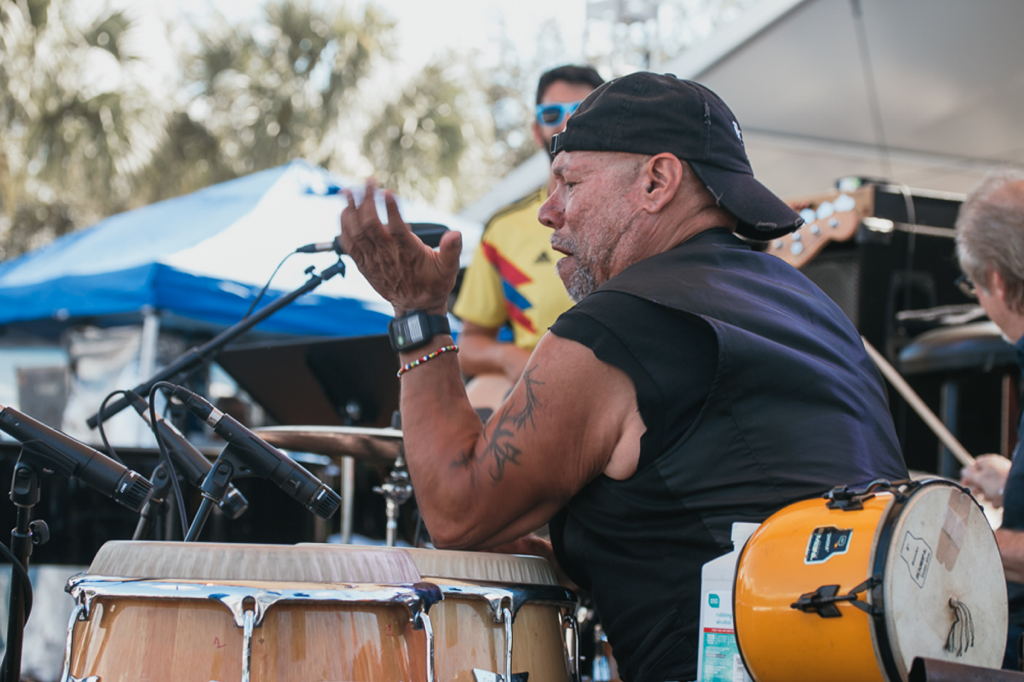
Ortiz playing percussion

Gumbi Ortiz (born October 13, 1955) pronounced “Goom-bee,” is an American percussionist, composer, producer, and music educator. For over 35 years, he has been the go-to percussionist and right-hand man for fusion guitarist Al Di Meola, accompanying him on solo shows and playing on various records, in various bands. His influences span genres, from jazz/fusion and pop to retro-soul, samba, and even a hint of Irish jig.

Ortiz’s debut solo album, Miami, pays tribute to his adopted home state of Florida, where he has resided since 1980. Saxophonists Eric Marienthal and Brandon Fields, keyboardist Jeff Lorber, and drummer Dave Weckl also play on it. Ortiz’s compositions draw from a wealth of styles, reflecting his Afro-Cuban roots, Latin rhythms, and even a touch of what he calls "Herbie Hancock funk." Ortiz has also led other projects, such as his group The Gumbi Band, The Latin Projekt, and eventually New Groove City.

== Early life ==
Born Gamaliel Ortiz in the South Bronx to a Puerto Rican father and Cuban mother, Ortiz played with Eddie Palmieri and Tito Puente. In his late teen years, he recalls hearing Return to Forever (the jazz band with Di Meola on guitar and Chick Corea on keyboards), which inspired him to change direction.

== Music career ==
=== 1980s ===
In the late 1980s, Ortiz saw Al Di Meola perform in France. At the show, Di Meola invited a local percussionist to play with him: a tradition of Di Meola's, which Ortiz soon discovered, as a year later he was asked to play at Di Meola's show in Florida. Impressed with Ortiz's skills, Di Meola hired him as his touring percussionist.

=== 1990s ===
Ortiz was a percussionist on Di Meola's 1991 album Kiss My Axe. This was well received by critics, and peaked at #2 on the Billboard Top Contemporary Jazz Album chart. He was featured again on Di Meola's next album World Sinfonia, also released in 1991. He played on Di Meola's next two studio albums, "Orange and Blue" (released in 1994) and "The Infinite Desire" (1998) in which Herbie Hancock plays acoustic piano.

Between tours, Ortiz continued to write, record, and perform music with his own bands. The first was a jam band, The Gumbi Band, whose completely improvised album Imagine That! won a Jammy Award in 1995. It also toured the southeastern United States, and opened for George Clinton.

=== 2000s ===
The Latino Projekt released the albums La Cura in 2000, and Soy de Aqui in 2005.

Ortiz played percussion in Di Meola's 2000 album World Sinfonía III – The Grande Passion, and again in 2002 with Di Meola's "Flesh on Flesh". Also in 2002, Ortiz helped compose the Iroko album, The Mango Project.

His 2007 release Miami is his only solo album. Mostly smooth jazz, it has elements of funk, salsa, and pop. Di Meola, his longtime collaborator, also returned to play on it.

Cosmopolitan Life is an album by Russian singer and composer Leonid Agutin, Di Meola and Ortiz, released in 2005.

Ortiz plays percussion on Di Meola's live albums as well. In 2008 Di Meola and the Hungarian flute player Eszter Horgas played together in Hungary to perform the remake of Bizet's Carmen.

World Sinfonia – La Melodia is a live album by Di Meola, released in 2008.

=== 2010s–present ===
Ortiz plays percussion in Pursuit of Radical Rhapsody, an album by Di Meola released in 2011.

In the early 2010s, he renamed the Latino Projekt to New Groove City and began working on their third studio album, New Groove City, released in the summer of 2012.

Ortiz and American musician Allen Carman became friends in the 1980s when Ortiz sat in with Carman’s popular Tampa-area group, City Heat. The concept for the Allen Carman Project began developing when the two musicians happened to do a gig together in 2015, when they discussed Ortiz's work with keyboardist and composer Philippe Saisse. Carman, who had been focused on his legal career, was happy to play music. In 2019 the Allen Carman Project was formed. The Allen Carman Project are: Allen Carman, Philippe Saisse, Gumbi Ortiz, Luis Aliceia and Kenny Anderson. Its debut album Carmanology has contributions from musicians such as Marc Antoine, Rick Braun, Nile Rodgers, Andy Snitzer, and Don Harrison.

In 2016, Ortiz worked with Marc Antoine on the album Laguna Beach. He also plays on a few songs from Senri Kawaguchi's 2016 album Cider: Hard & Sweet.

Ortiz is credited on Saisse's album On the Level, which was released in 2017.

The Allen Carman Project released the album I've Arrived in February 2024.
