= Diabolic Inventions and Seduction for Solo Guitar =

Studio album by Al Di Meola
- Released: January 8, 2007
- Recorded: January 2006
- Genre: Jazz
- Label: Di Meola, Inakustik
- Producer: Al Di Meola

Al Di Meola chronology
Consequence of Chaos (2006)	Diabolic Inventions and Seduction for Solo Guitar (2007)	World Sinfonia - La Melodia (2008)

Professional ratings
Review scores
Source	Rating
Allmusic	3.5/5 stars

Diabolic Inventions and Seduction for Solo Guitar, Vol. 1: Music of Astor Piazzolla is an album by Italian-American jazz fusion and Latin jazz guitarist Al Di Meola, released in 2007.

== Track listing ==
All songs by Ástor Piazzolla

1. "Campero" – 4:50
2. "Poemo Valseado" – 4:27
3. "Tangata del Alba" – 5:18
4. "Adios Nonino" – 4:52
5. "Tema de Maria" – 6:00
6. "Milonga del Angel" – 4:58
7. "Romantico" – 4:35
8. "Milonga Carrieguera" – 3:08

== Personnel ==
- Al Di Meola – guitar, handclapping, djembe
- Hernan Romero – handclapping, djembe
