= Egyptian Danza =

Song by Al Di Meola

from the album Casino
- Released: 1977
- Genre: Jazz fusion; Arabic
- Composer: Al Di Meola

"Egyptian Danza" is a composition by Latin jazz-fusion guitarist Al Di Meola. He first recorded it in 1977 for his album Casino and also recorded live in Philadelphia in February 1982. It later appeared on his 1994 album Essence of Al Di Meola. Heavily influenced by Contemporary Egyptian music and Ancient Egyptian music, the distinctive exotic middle-eastern mystical sound and atmosphere of the piece comes from the C♯ Phrygian dominant scale, which is composed from the fifth degree of an F♯ harmonic minor scale. When Di Meola performs it live the piece is characterised by muting at the top of the fretboard in parts and by very fast sporadic picking. Although he performs the piece on an electro acoustic guitar parts of the piece are played as on an electric guitar. It features violins and Latin congas in the background. The original album recording featured Mingo Lewis.
