= Passion, Grace and Fire =

Passion, Grace & Fire

Studio album by John McLaughlin, Al Di Meola, Paco de Lucía
- Released: 23 March 1983
- Recorded: September–October 1982
- Studio: Marcus Music UK, London
- Genre: New flamenco-jazz
- Length: 31:49
- Label: Philips
- Producer: John McLaughlin, Al Di Meola, Paco de Lucía

John McLaughlin, Al Di Meola, Paco de Lucía chronology
Friday Night in San Francisco (1981)	Passion, Grace & Fire (1983)	The Guitar Trio (1996)

John McLaughlin chronology
Music Spoken Here (1982)	Passion, Grace & Fire (1983)	Mahavishnu (1984)

Al Di Meola chronology
Electric Rendezvous (1982)	Passion, Grace & Fire (1983)	Scenario (1983)

Paco de Lucía chronology
Sólo quiero caminar (1981)	Passion, Grace & Fire (1983)	Live... One Summer Night (1984)

Professional ratings
Review scores
Source	Rating
AllMusic	4/5 stars
All About Jazz	
The Penguin Guide to Jazz Recordings	3.5/4 stars

Passion, Grace & Fire is the second album by John McLaughlin, Al Di Meola and Paco de Lucía released in 1983. Unlike their first album Friday Night in San Francisco, this album consists entirely of studio recordings.

== Track listing ==
=== Side one ===
1. "Aspan" (John McLaughlin) – 4:09
2. "Orient Blue Suite" (Al Di Meola) – 7:08
  - Part I
  - Part II
  - Part III
3. "Chiquito" (Paco de Lucía) – 4:46

=== Side two ===
1. "Sichia" (Paco de Lucía) – 3:50
2. "David" (John McLaughlin) – 6:30
3. "Passion, Grace & Fire" (Al Di Meola) – 5:26

== Personnel ==
Personnel per Philips Records.

Musicians

- John McLaughlin - nylon-string guitar (centre channel), producer
- Al Di Meola - Ovation steel-string acoustic guitar (left channel), producer
- Paco de Lucía - nylon-string guitar (right channel), producer

Production

- Barrie Marshall, Philip Roberge - executive producer
- Femi Jiya - engineer (Marcus Music UK)
- Brian Davies - assistant engineer (Marcus Music UK)
- Dennis Mackay - engineer (Eras Studio, New York and Wizzard Recording Studio, Briarcliff Manor)
- Marco Utano - assistant engineer (Eras Studio)
- Caryl Wheeler, Francis Manzella - assistant engineer (Wizzard Recording Studio)
- George Marino - master engineer

== Chart performance ==
Year	Chart	Position
1983	Billboard 200	171
1983	Billboard Top Jazz Albums	23
1983	Billboard Jazz Albums	9
