= World Sinfonia – La Melodia =

World Sinfonia - La Melodia

Live album by Al Di Meola
- Released: 2008
- Recorded: 2008
- Venues: Milano, Italy
- Genre: Jazz fusion
- Length: 67:08
- Label: Valiana
- Producer: Al Di Meola

Al Di Meola chronology
Diabolic Inventions And Seduction For Solo Guitar (2007)	World Sinfonia - La Melodia (2008)	Pursuit of Radical Rhapsody (2011)

World Sinfonia – La Melodia is a 2008 live album by American guitarist Al Di Meola. Recorded in Milano, Italy, it features Di Meola performing with his World Sinfonia ensemble. The album showcases his signature blend of jazz fusion, Latin jazz, and world music, with compositions by Di Meola, Ástor Piazzolla, Ennio Morricone, and a traditional Sardinian folk song.

The title 'La Melodia' (italian and spanish) means 'the melody' in English. 'La Melodia' has the same letters as 'Al Di Meola'. This interesting fact was brought to Al Di Meola's attention by a fan, José Gómez, on May 4, 2007, at the Teatro Romea in Murcia (Spain).

== Track listing ==
1. "Infinite Desire" (Al Di Meola) - 9:31
2. "Cafe 1930" (Ástor Piazzolla) - 6:18
3. "Cinema Paradiso" (Ennio Morricone) - 3:05
4. "Misterio" (Al Di Meola) - 10:29
5. "Double Concerto" (Ástor Piazzolla) - 8:50
6. "Turquoise" (Al Di Meola) - 8:50
7. "Umbras" (Andrea Parodi) - 10:40
8. "Mediterranean Sundance / Rio Ancho" (Al Di Meola / Paco de Lucia) - 4:45
9. "No Potho Reposare" (traditional) - 5:00

== Personnel ==
- Al Di Meola = acoustic guitar
- Fausto Beccalossi = accordion, vocals
- Peo Alfonsi = acoustic guitar
- Gumbi Ortiz = cajon
