= Electric Rendezvous =

Studio album by Al Di Meola
- Released: 1982
- Recorded: May–July 1981
- Studio: Electric Lady Studios and The Power Station (New York City, New York): Minot Sound (White Plains, New York); Cherokee Studios (Hollywood, California); Ochoa Recording Studios (San Juan, Puerto Rico)
- Genre: Jazz fusion
- Length: 34:27
- Label: Columbia
- Producer: Al Di Meola: Dennis Mackay

Al Di Meola chronology
Tour De Force – Live (1982)	Electric Rendezvous (1982)	Scenario (1983)

Professional ratings
Review scores
Source	Rating
Allmusic	3/5 stars
The Rolling Stone Jazz Record Guide	4/5 stars

Electric Rendezvous is the fifth studio album by jazz guitarist Al Di Meola that was released in 1982. It features flamenco guitarist Paco de Lucía (who recorded Friday Night in San Francisco with Di Meola and John McLaughlin) on “Passion, Grace & Fire”.

== Track listing ==
All songs by Al Di Meola unless otherwise noted.

1. "God Bird Change" (James Mingo Lewis) – 3:51
2. "Electric Rendezvous" – 7:47
3. "Passion, Grace & Fire" – 5:34
4. "Cruisin'" (Jan Hammer) – 4:16
5. "Black Cat Shuffle (Philippe Saisse) – 3:00
6. "Ritmo de la Noche" – 4:17
7. "Somalia" – 1:40
8. "Jewel Inside a Dream" – 4:02

== Personnel ==
- Al Di Meola – electric guitars, acoustic guitars
- Jan Hammer – keyboards (1–4, 6–8)
- Philippe Saisse – keyboards (5)
- Paco de Lucía – acoustic guitar (3)
- Anthony Jackson – bass guitar
- Steve Gadd – drums
- James Mingo Lewis – percussion

=== Production ===
- Philip Roberge – executive producer
- Al Di Meola – producer
- Dennis Mackay – co-producer, engineer
- Barry Bongiovi – assistant engineer
- Dave Greenberg – assistant engineer
- Chris Haas – assistant engineer
- Jeff Hendrickson – assistant engineer
- James Nichols – assistant engineer
- Paul Ray – assistant engineer
- Bruce Robbins – assistant engineer
- Mark Sackett – assistant engineer
- David Spritz – assistant engineer
- Stephen Benben – assistant engineer (3)
- Steve Bravin – assistant engineer (3)
- Bob Ludwig – mastering at Masterdisk (New York, NY)
- Paula Scher – design
- Mark Hess – illustration

== Chart performance ==
Year	Chart	Position
1982	Billboard 200	55
1982	Billboard Top Jazz Albums	3
