= World Sinfonía III – The Grande Passion =

World Sinfonía III - The Grande Passion

Studio album by Al Di Meola
- Released: 24 October 2000
- Recorded: February–April, 2000
- Studio: Churchill Studios (New Jersey): Chung King Studios (New York, NY)
- Genre: Jazz
- Length: 59:39
- Label: Telarc
- Producer: Al Di Meola

Al Di Meola chronology
Winter Nights (1999)	World Sinfonía III - The Grande Passion (2000)	Flesh on Flesh (2002)

Professional ratings
Review scores
Source	Rating
AllMusic	4/5 stars
All About Jazz	(very favourable)

World Sinfonía III – The Grande Passion is an album by jazz guitarist Al Di Meola that was released in 2000.

== Track listing ==
All songs by Al Di Meola unless otherwise noted.

1. "Misterio" – 7:53
2. "Double Concerto" (Ástor Piazzolla) – 5:55
3. "Prelude: Adagio for Theresa" (Di Meola, Parmisano) – 1:22
4. "The Grande Passion" – 9:04
5. "Asia de Cuba" – 8:57
6. "Soledad" (Piazzolla) – 7:37
7. "Opus in Green" – 10:18
8. "Libertango" (Piazzolla) – 5:06
9. "Azucar" – 3:12

== Personnel ==
- Al Di Meola – acoustic guitars, Roland GR-30 (1, 2, 4, 5, 8), dumbek (1), cymbals (1, 4), acoustic bass guitar (4), percussion (4, 5, 7)
- Mario Parmisano – acoustic piano (1–8), synthesizers (5, 7)
- Hernan Romero – background harmony guitar (1), charango (4), vocals (4), second acoustic guitar part (6), acoustic bass guitar (7)
- John Patitucci – acoustic bass guitar (1, 5)
- Gilad Dobrecky – percussion (2, 4, 5, 7, 8)
- Gumbi Ortiz – congas (4, 5, 7)
- Oscar Feldman – tenor saxophone (5)
- Michael Philip Mossman – trumpet (5)
- Arto Tunçboyacıyan – vocals (1), percussion (8, 9)

Toronto Symphony Orchestra (Tracks 1–4 & 6)

- Al Di Meola and Mario Parmisano – arrangements
- Fabrizio Festa – orchestrator and conductor
- James Spragg – orchestra manager
- Mark Skazinetsky – concertmaster

Woodwinds and Horns

- Michael Sweeney – bassoon
- Joaquin Valdepenas – clarinet
- Camille Watts – flute
- Cynthia Steljes – oboe
- Harcus Hennigar and Fred Rizner – French horn

Strings

- Simon Fryer, David Hetherington and Audrey King – cello
- Chas Elliott and Roberto Occhipinti – double bass
- Erica Goodman – harp
- Daniel Blackman, Susan Lipchak, Chris Redfield and Kent Teeple – viola
- Carol Fujino, Bridget Hunt, Leslie Knowles, Victoria Richards, Mac-André Savoie and Mark Skazinetsky – first violin
- Amalia Jouanou-Canzoneri, Mi-Hyon Kim, Semyon Pertsovsky, Wendy Rose and Virginia Wells – second violin

=== Production ===
- Robert Woods – executive producer
- Al Di Meola – producer, arrangements
- Hernan Romero – associate producer
- Mario Parmisano – associate producer
- David Baker – recording engineer
- Katsuhiko Naito – recording engineer, mix engineer
- Henry Nophsker – recording engineer, assistant mix engineer
- Ted Jensen – mastering at Sterling Sound (New York, NY)
- Anilda Carrasquillo – art direction, design
- Layla Di Meola – cover design
- Andrea Vizzini – cover painting

== Charts ==
Year	Chart	Position
2001	Billboard Top Contemporary Jazz Albums	24
