= Barry Miles (musician) =

American musician (born 1947)

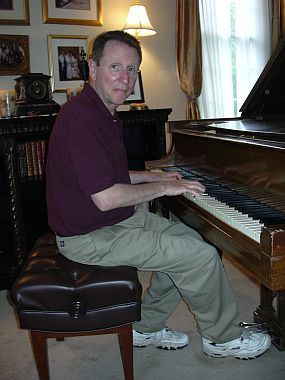

Background information
- Born: March 28, 1947 (age 79)
- Genres: Jazz, pop
- Occupation: Musician
- Instrument: Keyboards
- Years active: 1956–present
- Formerly of: Roberta Flack, Al Di Meola

Barry Miles (born March 28, 1947) is an American pianist, record producer, and author.

== Life and career ==
Miles was born Barry Miles Silverlight to Arthur and Hermine (née Klein) in Newark, New Jersey and grew up in North Plainfield, New Jersey.

He joined the musicians union at age nine in 1956 as a child prodigy drummer/pianist/vibist appearing with Miles Davis and John Coltrane among other talents of the day live and on TV shows including To Tell the Truth, Dick Van Dyke's variety show, and The Andy Williams Show. He made his solo artist debut recording at age fourteen in 1961, "Miles of Genius", as drummer and composer with sidemen Al Hall and Duke Jordan. Miles continued to perform with his own band in the early 1960s in which he composed the material that enabled up and coming talents such as Woody Shaw, Eddie Gómez and Robin Kenyatta to display their talents.

He wrote the instruction book, "Twelve Themes With Improvisations", published in 1963 by Belwin-Mills, and currently out of print.

While a student at Princeton University, Miles concentrated his efforts on his piano playing, recording a live album in 1966 entitled Barry Miles Presents His Syncretic Compositions. He applied the philosophical term "syncretic" to music, defining the process of melding any combination of musical influences and styles together in the improvisational jazz idiom with originality. The combination of Miles's early jazz influences, his early Rock and roll background from the late 1950s and early 1960s, and his innovative "melting pot of musical styles" concept, resulted in this recording.

Miles followed this release in 1969 with the eponymously titled album, Barry Miles, incorporating electric instruments including the electric piano.

In 1971, Miles recruited his brother Terry Silverlight on drums along with guitarists Pat Martino and John Abercrombie to record his White Heat album, which is regarded as one of the pioneering fusion jazz recordings.

For the next decade, Miles recorded several albums in which he developed the principle of fusing styles together in jazz.

In the late 1970s and throughout the 1980s, Miles embarked upon a prolific career as a keyboardist and Minimoog soloist on many recordings in the heyday of studio work, while working as Roberta Flack's musical director for a stint that lasted fifteen years. During that time, he composed, produced and recorded songs that Flack recorded in the film Bustin' Loose, and on her album Oasis. After Al Di Meola's stint as the guitarist in Miles's band on live performances and Miles's PBS special "Fusion Suite" in 1973, a long-lasting relationship developed between Miles and Di Meola that resulted in Miles's frequent appearances as keyboardist on Di Meola's albums along with co-production credits.

In 2013, Barry released Home and Away, Volume One, his first album as a leader in 27 years.

== Discography ==
=== As leader ===
- Miles of Genius (Charlie Parker 1962)
- Presents His New Syncretic Compositions (Venture, 1966)
- Barry Miles (Poppy Music, 1970)
- White Heat (Mainstream, 1971)
- Scatbird (Mainstream, 1972)
- Barry Miles and Silverlight (London 1974)
- Magic Theater (London 1975)
- Together with Eric Kloss (Muse, 1976)
- Sky Train (RCA, 1977)
- Fusion Is... (Century, 1978)
- Zoot Suit Stomp (Unidisc, 1986)
- Home and Away, Volume One (CD Baby, 2013)

=== As sideman ===
With Al Di Meola

- Land of the Midnight Sun (Columbia, 1976)
- Elegant Gypsy (Columbia, 1977)
- Casino (Columbia, 1978)
- Kiss My Axe (Tomato, 1991)
- Consequence of Chaos (Telarc, 2006)
- Pursuit of Radical Rhapsody (Telarc, 2011)

With Roberta Flack

- Bustin' Loose (MCA, 1981)
- Oasis (Atlantic, 1988)
- Roberta (Atlantic, 1994)

With others

- Franco Ambrosetti, Sleeping Gypsy (Gryphon, 1980)
- Patti Austin, End of a Rainbow (CTI, 1976)
- Bazuka, Bazuka (A&M, 1975)
- Charles Calello, Calello Serenade (Midsong, 1979)
- Creme D'Cocoa, Funked Up (Venture, 1978)
- The Ebonys, Sing About Life (Buddah, 1976)
- Epo, Goodies (RCA, 1980)
- Gabrielle Goodman, Travelin' Light (JMT, 1993)
- Gabrielle Goodman, Angel Eyes (2003)
- Urbie Green, The Fox (CTI, 1977)
- Vic Juris, Roadsong (Muse, 1978)
- Eric Kloss, Bodies' Warmth (Muse, 1975)
- Eric Kloss, Celebration (Muse, 1980)
- Gladys Knight & the Pips, Still Together (Buddah, 1977)
- Gladys Knight & the Pips, Imagination
- Gladys Knight & the Pips, I Feel a Song
- Jimmy McGriff, Outside Looking In (LRC, 1978)
- Esther Phillips, Capricorn Princess (Kudu, 1976)
- Mongo Santamaria, Red Hot (Tappan Zee, 1979)
- Terry Silverlight, Terry Silverlight (Cymekob, 1997)
- Joe Simon, Happy Birthday Baby (Spring 1979)
- Nino Tempo, Tenor Saxophone (Atlantic, 1990)
- Mel Torme, A New Album (Gryphon, 1980)
- Mel Torme, The London Sessions (DCC, 1990)
- The Whatnauts, Corruption (P-Vine 2004)
