= Orange and Blue (album) =

Studio album by Al Di Meola
- Released: 1994
- Studio: The Hit Factory, Power Station and Manhattan Center Studios (New York City, New York): Churchill Studios (New Jersey)
- Genre: Jazz fusion
- Length: 58:54
- Label: Tomato
- Producer: Al Di Meola: Hernan Romero

Al Di Meola chronology
Heart of the Immigrants (1993)	Orange and Blue (1994)	Di Meola Plays Piazzolla (1996)

Professional ratings
Review scores
Source	Rating
Allmusic	3/5 stars

Orange and Blue is an album by jazz guitarist Al Di Meola that was released in 1994.

== Track listing ==
All songs by Al Di Meola unless otherwise noted.

1. "Paradisio" – 7:19
2. "Chilean Pipe Song" – 4:52
3. "Ta'alina Chant" (Di Meola, Noa) – 1:56
4. "Orange and Blue" – 7:31
5. "This Way Before" – 4:39
6. "Summer Country Song" – 5:29
7. "If We Meet Again, Part I" – 1:29
8. "If We Meet Again, Part II" (Di Meola, Hernan Romero, Mario Parmisano) – 5:03
9. "Cyprus" (Di Meola, George Dalaras, Polykarpos Kyriacou) – 3:51
10. "Theme of the Mothership" (Chick Corea, Di Meola) – 5:25
11. "Precious Little You" – 4:24
12. "Casmir" – 4:07
13. "On My Own" – 3:20

== Personnel ==
- Al Di Meola – electric jazz guitar (1, 2, 4–8, 10–12), 12-string acoustic guitars (1), Roland GR-1 guitar synthesizer (1, 2, 4, 11, 12), Ovation guitar (2, 5, 6, 9, 12, 13), drums (1, 2), percussion (1, 3–6, 9–13), cymbals (1, 4, 6–8, 10), acoustic guitar (4–9, 13), shakers (2), pipes (2, 12), additional synthesizers (3), classical guitar (3, 4, 7, 8, 11), violin (5), synthesizers (10), finger snaps (10), Kurzweil piccolo flute (11), Hawaiian string harp (11), santoor (12), tablas (12), tom toms (12), duduk (12), Steinway grand piano (13), handclaps (13)
- Mario Parmisano – Steinway grand piano (1, 2, 4–9, 11, 12), additional keyboards (1, 2, 4–9, 11), strings (6), Fender Rhodes (10), Hammond organ (10), keyboard bass (10), finger snaps (10), orchestral strings (13), bass (13)
- Hernan Romero – acoustic guitar (1, 12), charango (1, 2, 9), vocals (1, 4, 6, 8, 10), synthesizers (3), bells (4, 8), additional synthesizers (6), finger snaps (10), strummed piano strings (11)
- Marc Johnson – acoustic bass (1, 2, 5–8, 11, 12)
- Pino Palladino – fretless bass (4)
- Manu Katché – drums (4, 9, 11)
- Peter Erskine – drums (6–8)
- Steve Gadd – drums (10, 12)
- Gumbi Ortiz – congas (4, 10), bongo (12)
- Andrés Boiarsky – saxophones (4)
- Conrad Herwig – trombone (4)
- Michael Pinella – trumpet (4)
- Simon Shaneen – violin (12)
- Noa – vocals (3)
- George Dalaras – vocals (9)

=== Production ===
- Gordon Meltzer – executive producer, management
- Al Di Meola – producer, front cover design
- Hernan Romero – co-producer
- Mario Parmisano – associate producer
- Matthew LaMonica – recording, mixing
- Sean Haines – recording assistant
- Roy Clark – second engineer
- Tommy Galligan – second engineer
- Andy Grassi – second engineer
- Barbara Lipke – second engineer
- Bill Meho – second engineer
- Rory Romano – second engineer
- Shunya Sawada – second engineer
- Scott Young – second engineer
- Greg Calbi – mastering
- Scott Hull – mastering
- Masterdisk (New York, NY) – mastering location
- Michelle Laurençot – art direction, design
- Helge Hommes – front cover artwork
- Polykarpos Kyriacou – front cover design
- Rodney L. Cameron – photography
- Jan Frank – photography
- Peter Shukat – management

== Chart performance ==
Year	Chart	Position
1994	Billboard Top Jazz Albums	17
