= The Infinite Desire =

Studio album by Al Di Meola
- Released: August 18, 1998
- Studio: Right Track Recording and Chung King Studios (New York, NY)
- Genre: Jazz fusion
- Length: 63:11
- Label: Telarc
- Producer: Al Di Meola: Hernan Romero

Al Di Meola chronology
Di Meola Plays Piazzolla (1996)	The Infinite Desire (1998)	Winter Nights (1999)

Professional ratings
Review scores
Source	Rating
Allmusic	4/5 stars
All About Jazz	(favourable)

The Infinite Desire is an album by jazz guitarist Al Di Meola that was released in 1998. Pianist Herbie Hancock plays acoustic piano on one pice, guitarist Steve Vai also plays electric guitar on another. Other guests include Pino Daniele on vocals, Mario Parmisano on keyboards, piano and strings and Rachel Z also on keyboards.

== Track listing ==
All songs by Al Di Meola unless otherwise noted.

1. "Beyond the Mirage" – 7:18
2. "Shaking the Spirits" – 6:30
3. "Vizzini" – 4:54
4. "In My Mother's Eyes (Memory of Theresa)" – 4:41
5. "The Infinite Desire" (Al Di Meola, Pino Daniele) – 5:26
6. "Invention of the Monsters" – 3:06
7. "Istanbul" – 8:00
8. "Azzura" – 2:55
9. "Big Sky Azzura" – 6:07
10. "Race with Devil on Turkish Highway" – 4:03
11. "Valentina" – 4:44
12. "The Infinite Desire (Vocal)" (Di Meola, Daniele) – 5:27

== Personnel ==
- Al Di Meola – acoustic guitar (1–5, 7, 10, 12), electric guitar (1, 3, 6, 7, 9–11), nylon guitar (1, 9), Roland VG-8 guitar synthesizer (1–3, 6–9, 11), cymbals (2, 3, 12), percussion (2, 7, 9, 12), acoustic electric guitar (3, 11), marimba (3), 10-string harp (7), finger cymbals (7), classical guitar (8), steel-string guitar (8), Roland GR-30 guitar synthesizer (8), acoustic bass (11)
- Spyros Poulos – programming, sound design
- Rachel Z – acoustic piano (1–7, 10, 11), keyboards (1–7, 10–12), programming, sound design
- Mario Parmisano – strings (1), acoustic piano (6, 8, 9), keyboards (6, 9), synthesizers (8)
- Herbie Hancock – acoustic piano solo (7)
- Steve Vai – electric guitar (10)
- John Patitucci – electric bass (1), acoustic bass (4, 5, 12)
- Tom Kennedy – acoustic bass (3, 6, 8, 9)
- Peter Erskine – drums (3, 7)
- Ernie Adams – drums (6, 9)
- Gumbi Ortiz – percussion (1, 10), congas (7)
- Kabuli Nitasa – violin (1), vocals (1)
- Oriana Di Meola – vocal solo intro (2), choir (2)
- Layla Francesca Di Meola – vocals (2)
- Pino Daniele – vocals (12)

=== Production ===
- Robert Woods – executive producer
- Al Di Meola – producer, arrangements, liner notes
- Hernan Romero – co-producer
- Frank Filipetti – engineer
- Spyros Poulos – engineer
- Goh Hotoda – engineer (1–3, 5–9, 12)
- Peter Carmam – assistant engineer
- Brian Garten – assistant engineer
- Henry Nophsker – assistant engineer
- Jamie Siegel – assistant engineer (1–3, 5–9, 12)
- John Wydrycs – assistant engineer (1–3, 5–9, 12)
- Rich Tozzoli – digital editing, technical assistance
- Bob Ludwig – mastering at Gateway Mastering (Portland, Maine)
- Wil Beaucher – project coordinator, candid session photography
- Anilda Carraaquillo – art direction, design
- Andrea Vizzini – paintings
- Peter Zander – photos of Al Di Meola

== Chart performance ==
Year	Chart	Position
1998	Billboard Top Contemporary Jazz Albums	17
