= Magic Touch (Stanley Jordan album) =

Studio album by Stanley Jordan
- Released: 1985
- Studio: Song Shop Studio, New York City
- Genre: Smooth jazz, jazz fusion
- Length: 53:52
- Label: Blue Note
- Producer: Al Di Meola, Christine Martin

Stanley Jordan chronology
Magic Touch (1985)	Standards Volume 1 (1986)

Magic Touch is the first studio album by guitarist Stanley Jordan, released in 1985 by Blue Note Records on vinyl; a CD edition was issued in 1990. Jazz fusion guitarist Al Di Meola produced it. The record spent 51 weeks at No. 1 on Billboard's jazz chart, and went gold almost 20 years after its release. It earned Grammy nominations: Best Jazz Instrumental Performance, Soloist and Best Jazz Fusion Performance, Vocal Or Instrumental.

== Artistry ==
Producer Al Di Meola granted Stanley Jordan had a "phenomenal" approach to guitar tapping, taking it "into another dimension." He pointed out, though, that Jordan's style was closer to a keyboardist than a guitarist, owing to the fact he doesn't use picks or strum chords either.

== Critical reception ==
Professional ratings
Review scores
Source	Rating
AllMusic	4.5/5 stars

Daniel Gioffre at AllMusic awarded Magic Touch 4.5 stars out of 5, calling it "An instant classic, and one of the definitive moments of modern jazz guitar." He listed "Eleanor Rigby", "The Lady in My Life", "Freddie Freeloader", "'Round Midnight", and "A Child Is Born" as highlights.

== Track listing ==
All tracks are written by Stanley Jordan, except where noted.

No.	Title	Length
1.	"Eleanor Rigby" (John Lennon, Paul McCartney)	7:01
2.	"Freddie Freeloader" (Miles Davis)	6:09
3.	"'Round Midnight" (Thelonious Monk)	5:08
4.	"All the Children"	5:03
5.	"The Lady in My Life" (Rod Temperton)	6:26
6.	"Angel" (Jimi Hendrix)	4:14
7.	"Fundance"	2:35
8.	"New Love"	5:38
9.	"Return Expedition"	8:03
10.	"A Child Is Born" (Thad Jones)	3:35
Total length:		53:52

== Personnel ==
- Stanley Jordan – guitar
- Onaje Allan Gumbs – keyboard
- Wayne Braithwaite – bass
- Charnett Moffett – bass
- Peter Erskine – drums
- Omar Hakim – drums
- Al Di Meola – cymbals
- Sammy Figueroa – percussion
- Bugsy Moore – percussion

Production

- James Farber – engineer
- Kenny Florendo – assistant engineer
- Al Di Meola – producer
- Christine Martin – producer
