= Di Meola Plays Piazzolla =

Studio album by Al Di Meola
- Released: November 5, 1996
- Studio: The Hit Factory, Skyline Studios and The Tracking Zone (New York City, New York): Sound Chamber Recorders (North Hollywood, California)
- Genre: Jazz fusion
- Length: 59:54
- Label: Mesa/Bluemoon
- Producer: Al Di Meola: Hernan Romero (Tracks 1 & 5)

Al Di Meola chronology
Orange and Blue (1994)	Di Meola Plays Piazzolla (1996)	The Infinite Desire (1998)

Professional ratings
Review scores
Source	Rating
Allmusic	4/5 stars

Di Meola Plays Piazzolla is an album by Al Di Meola which is a tribute to Argentine composer Ástor Piazzolla. Eight of the ten songs were written by Piazzolla. Di Meola is accompanied by percussionist Arto Tuncboyacian and Dino Saluzzi, who plays bandoneon. Vince Mendoza provided some of the string arrangements.

== Track listing ==
All songs by Ástor Piazzolla except where noted.

1. "Oblivión" – 6:01
2. "Café 1930" – 6:13
3. "Tango Suite, Pt. I" – 8:49
4. "Tango Suite, Pt. III" – 8:50
5. "Verano Reflections" (Piazzolla, Di Meola) – 4:10
6. "Night Club 1960" – 5:44
7. "Tango II" – 5:33
8. "Bordel 1900" – 4:30
9. "Milonga del Angel" – 3:44
10. "Last Tango for Astor" (Di Meola) – 6:20

== Personnel ==
- Al Di Meola – guitars (1, 2, 5–9), all guitar parts (1), percussion (1, 5), orchestration (1, 5, 10), arrangements (1–6, 8, 10), acoustic guitars (3, 4, 10), pandean pipe (5), voice (5), guitar solo (9)
- Spyros Poulos – programming (1, 5)
- Dino Saluzzi – bandoneon (2–4, 7, 8, 10)
- Hernan Romero – keyboards (5), charango (5), voice (5, 8)
- Chris Carrington – guitars (2, 6), classical guitar (3, 4, 10)
- Arto Tunçboyacıyan – percussion (3, 4, 6, 8, 10), voice (3, 4, 10)
- Gumbi Ortiz – percussion (3, 4, 10), congas (3, 4, 10)
- Vince Mendoza – string arrangements (2, 6, 8)

=== Production ===
- Al Di Meola – producer
- Hernan Romero – co-producer (1, 5)
- David Baker – assistant producer (1), engineer (1, 3–5)
- Roy Hendrickson – engineer (2, 6–9)
- Dan Garcia – string engineer (2), engineer (6, 8)
- Scott Ansell – engineer (10)
- Joe Ferla – engineer (10)
- Rich Tozzoli – assistant engineer (1, 5)
- Sean Haines – assistant engineer (3, 4, 6–9)
- Michael Nuceder – assistant engineer (3, 4)
- Bob Ludwig – mastering at Gateway Mastering (Portland, Maine) and Sound On Sound (New York, NY)
- Richard Evans – art direction, design, photography
- Richard Haughton – photos of Al Di Meola
- Camilla Van Zuylen – photo of Astor Piazzolla
