= Elegant Gypsy =

Studio album by Al Di Meola
- Released: April 1977
- Recorded: December 1976–January 1977
- Genre: Jazz rock
- Length: 37:00
- Label: Columbia
- Producer: Al Di Meola

Al Di Meola chronology
Land of the Midnight Sun (1976)	Elegant Gypsy (1977)	Casino (1978)

Professional ratings
Review scores
Source	Rating
AllMusic	5/5 stars
The Rolling Stone Jazz Record Guide	3/5 stars

Elegant Gypsy is the second album by American jazz fusion guitarist Al Di Meola. It was released in 1977 by Columbia Records.

== Background ==
Elegant Gypsy was a follow-up album to Di Meola's debut release, Land of the Midnight Sun. The distinctive music on the album is a speedy fusion of jazz and rock, with a blend of lightning-fast electric riffs and lyrical acoustic passages. The songs include explorations of Latin music themes, including acoustic genres like flamenco.

The inspiration behind one of di Meola's signature songs, “Race with Devil on Spanish Highway”, came from The Kinks’ garage rock classic "You Really Got Me". It was the first song he attempted to play on the guitar, when he was between eight and nine years old.

Elegant Gypsy won an annual award for Best Guitar Album in Guitar Player.

Janice Dickinson is the model on the album cover.

== Track listing ==
All songs by Al Di Meola unless otherwise noted.

Side 1
No.	Title	Writer(s)	Length
1.	"Flight Over Rio"	Mingo Lewis	7:16
2.	"Midnight Tango"		7:28
3.	"Mediterranean Sundance"		5:14

Side 2
No.	Title	Length
4.	"Race with Devil on Spanish Highway"	6:18
5.	"Lady of Rome, Sister of Brazil"	1:46
6.	"Elegant Gypsy Suite"	9:16

== Personnel ==
- Al Di Meola – electric and acoustic guitars, piano, synthesizer, percussion
- Paco de Lucía – acoustic guitar on "Mediterranean Sundance"
- Jan Hammer – keyboards on "Flight Over Rio" and "Elegant Gypsy Suite"
- Barry Miles – keyboards on "Midnight Tango" and "Race With Devil On Spanish Highway"
- Anthony Jackson – bass guitar
- Steve Gadd – drums on "Flight Over Rio" and "Elegant Gypsy Suite"
- Lenny White – drums on "Midnight Tango" and "Race With Devil On Spanish Highway"
- Mingo Lewis – congas, synthesizers, organ, percussion

== Chart performance ==
Year	Chart	Position
1977	Billboard 200	58
1977	Billboard Top Jazz Albums	5

== Certifications ==
Region	Certification	Certified units/sales
United States (RIAA)	Gold	500,000^{^}
^{^} Shipments figures based on certification alone.
