= Tour De Force – Live =

Tour de Force – Live

Live album by Al Di Meola
- Released: 1982
- Recorded: February 4, 1982
- Venue: Tower Theatre (Upper Darby, Pennsylvania, US)
- Genre: Jazz fusion
- Length: 39:53
- Label: Columbia
- Producer: Al Di Meola

Al Di Meola chronology
Splendido Hotel (1980)	Tour de Force – Live (1982)	Electric Rendezvous (1982)

Professional ratings
Review scores
Source	Rating
AllMusic	3/5 stars
The Rolling Stone Jazz Record Guide	3/5 stars

Tour de Force — Live is a live album by jazz guitarist Al Di Meola that was released in 1982 and recorded on February 4, 1982, at Tower Theatre in Upper Darby Township, Pennsylvania. Additional keyboards and percussion were overdubbed in the studio.

== Track listing ==
All songs by Al Di Meola, except where noted.

1. "Elegant Gypsy Suite" – 10:10
2. "Nena" – 5:06
3. "Advantage" (Jan Hammer) – 5:00
4. "Egyptian Danza" – 5:41
5. "Race with Devil on Spanish Highway" – 7:36
6. "Cruisin'" (Jan Hammer) – 5:26

== Personnel ==
- Al Di Meola – acoustic & electric guitars
- Jan Hammer – keyboards
- Victor Godsey – keyboards
- Philippe Saisse – additional keyboards (tracks 1, 5)
- Anthony Jackson – electric bass guitar
- Steve Gadd – drums, percussion
- Mingo Lewis – percussion
- Sammy Figueroa – additional percussion (tracks 1–3)
- Dennis Mackay – co-producer, engineer

== Charts ==
Album – Billboard (North America)

Year	Chart	Position
1983	Pop Albums	195
1983	Jazz Albums	8
