= Cielo e Terra =

Studio album by Al Di Meola
- Released: 1985
- Recorded: 1985
- Studio: Right Track Recording (New York City, New York)
- Genre: Jazz, jazz fusion
- Length: 49:02
- Label: Manhattan
- Producer: Al Di Meola: David Baker

Al Di Meola chronology
Soaring Through a Dream (1985)	Cielo e Terra (1985)	Tirami Su (1987)

Professional ratings
Review scores
Source	Rating
Allmusic	3/5 stars

Cielo e Terra is an album by jazz guitarist Al Di Meola that was released in 1985. Airto Moreira plays all percussion on "Traces (of a Tear)", "Cielo e Terra", "When You're Gone", and "Solace".

Cielo e Terra's original title was to be 21st Century Guitar, a homage to Julian Bream's 20th Century Guitar (1966) album. He greatly appreciates Bream's rendition of Frank Martin's "Quatre pièces brèves" (1933), available on the record. He has performed them live on occasion.

== Track listing ==
All songs by Al Di Meola unless otherwise noted.

1. "Traces of a Tear" – 7:50
2. "Vertigo Shadow" – 3:12
3. "Cielo e Terra" – 10:50
4. "Enigma of Desire" – 2:43
5. "Atavism of Twilight" – 5:16
6. "Coral" (Keith Jarrett) – 3:17
7. "When You're Gone" – 4:21
8. "Etude" – 7:01
9. "Solace" – 4:42
  Bonus track from 1996 CD release
10. "Traces (of a Tear)" - 8:57

== Personnel ==
- Al Di Meola – acoustic guitars, Synclavier guitar
- Airto Moreira – percussion (1, 3, 7, 9)

Production

- Christian Dalbavie – executive producer
- Philip Roberge – executive producer
- Al Di Meola – producer
- David Baker – co-producer, engineer
- Moira Marquis – assistant engineer
- Bob Ludwig – mastering at Masterdisk (New York, NY)
- Koppel & Scher – design
- Beverly Parker – back photography
- Stephen Wilkes – cover photography

== Chart performance ==
Year	Chart	Position
1985	Billboard Top Jazz Albums	18

== Bibliography ==
- Ferguson, Jim (January 1992). "25 Players Who Shook the World: Julian Bream". Guitar Player. 26 (1). San Francisco, CA: 19, 35–36, 130. ISSN 0017-5463.
