= Soaring Through a Dream =

Studio album by Al Di Meola
- Released: 1985
- Studio: Right Track Recording (New York, NY)
- Genre: Jazz fusion
- Length: 45:57
- Label: Manhattan
- Producer: David Baker: Al Di Meola

Al Di Meola chronology
Scenario (1983)	Soaring Through a Dream (1985)	Cielo e Terra (1985)

Professional ratings
Review scores
Source	Rating
Allmusic	2/5 stars

Soaring Through a Dream is an album by jazz guitarist Al Di Meola that was released in 1985.

== Track listing ==
1. "Capoeira" (Al Di Meola, Airto Moreira) – 9:21
2. "Traces (Of A Tear)" (Di Meola) – 9:00
3. "Broken Heart" (Di Meola) – 5:00
4. "July" (Di Meola) – 5:25
5. "Marina" (Di Meola, Moreira) – 4:45
6. "Soaring Through A Dream" (Di Meola, Moreira) – 12:26

== Personnel ==
- Al Di Meola – acoustic guitar, electric guitar, classical guitar, Synclavier guitar
- Phil Markowitz – Steinway grand piano, synthesizers
- Chip Jackson – electric bass, acoustic bass
- Danny Gottlieb – drums
- Airto Moreira – percussion, vocals

=== Production ===
- John Cerullo – executive producer
- Al Di Meola – producer
- David Baker – co-producer, engineer
- Scott Mabuchi – assistant engineer
- Bob Ludwig – mastering at Masterdisk (New York, NY)
- Koppel & Scher – design
- Tony Sellari – design
- Stephen Wilkes – photography

== Chart performance ==
Year	Chart	Position
1985	Billboard Top Jazz Albums	14
