= Heart of the Immigrants =

Studio album by Al Di Meola
- Released: 1993
- Recorded: 1993
- Studio: The Hit Factory and Skyline Studios (New York, NY): Churchill Digital Studios (New Jersey); Sound Chamber Recorders (North Hollywood, California)
- Genre: Jazz fusion
- Length: 64:51
- Label: Tomato
- Producer: Al Di Meola

Al Di Meola chronology
| World Sinfonia (1991) | Heart of the Immigrants (1993) | Orange and Blue (1994) |

Professional ratings
Review scores
| Source | Rating |
|---|---|
| Allmusic | 4/5 stars |

Heart of the Immigrants is an album by jazz guitarist Al Di Meola that was released in 1993.

== Track listing ==
| No. | Title | Writer(s) | Length |
|---|---|---|---|
| 1. | "Nightclub 1960" | Ástor Piazzolla | 5:46 |
| 2. | "Vistaero" | Al Di Meola | 4:36 |
| 3. | "Carousel Requiem" | Di Meola | 6:18 |
| 4. | "Tango II" | Piazzolla | 5:35 |
| 5. | "Under A Dark Moon" | Di Meola | 5:12 |
| 6. | "Bordel 1900" | Piazzolla | 4:33 |
| 7. | "Indigo" | Di Meola | 7:05 |
| 8. | "Heru Mertar/Don't Go So Far Away" | Arto Tuncboyaciyan | 4:39 |
| 9. | "Parranda" | Di Meola | 4:26 |
| 10. | "Someday My Prince Will Come" | F. E. Churchill, L. Morey | 5:12 |
| 11. | "Cafe 1930" | Piazzolla | 6:16 |
| 12. | "They Love Me From Fifteen Feet Away" | Tuncboyaciyan | 1:24 |
| 13. | "Milonga Del Angel" | Piazzolla | 3:46 |
| Total length: | | | 64:48 |

== Personnel ==
- Al Di Meola – acoustic guitar (1, 6, 7, 11, 12), classical guitar (2, 4, 8–10, 13), charango (2), all guitars (3), all instruments and parts (3), guitar (5), Roland GR1 guitar synthesizer (5), Synclavier (5), voice (5)
- Chris Carrington – classical guitar (1, 6, 7, 11)
- Dino Saluzzi – bandoneon (2, 4, 6, 8–12)
- Arto Tunçboyacıyan – percussion (1, 2, 6, 7, 9), voice (7, 8, 11), Turkish string instrument (8)
- Astor Piazzolla – arrangements (11)
- Hernan Romero – voice (2, 5, 9)

String Section (Tracks 1, 6, 7 & 11)

- Vince Mendoza – arrangements and conductor
- Frank Capp and Gus Klein – contractors
- Tim Barr and Arni Eglisson – bass
- Jodi Burnett, Barry Gold, Tim Landauer, Ronald Leonard, Gloria Lum, David Speltz and Nancy Stein-Ross – cello

=== Production ===
- Al Di Meola – producer, mixing
- Dan Garcia – recording
- Roy Hendrickson – recording, mixing
- Sean Haines – additional recording, pre-production engineer, project assistance
- Bob Ludwig – mastering at Gateway Mastering (Portland, Maine)
- Carol Spranz – project assistance
- Michelle Laurençot – art direction, design
- Robert Allen – front cover photography
- John McLean – front cover photography (lower left photo)
- Nathaniel Welch – photo of Al Di Meola
- Gordon Meltzer – management
- Peter Shukat – management

== Chart performance ==
| Year | Chart | Position |
|---|---|---|
| 1993 | Billboard Top Contemporary Jazz Albums | 15 |
