= Splendido Hotel =

Studio album by Al Di Meola
- Released: May 10, 1980
- Recorded: 1979
- Genre: Jazz, jazz fusion
- Length: 68:43
- Label: Columbia
- Producer: Al Di Meola

Al Di Meola chronology
Casino (1978)	Splendido Hotel (1980)	Tour De Force – Live (1982)

Professional ratings
Review scores
Source	Rating
Allmusic	5/5 stars
The Rolling Stone Jazz Record Guide	4/5 stars

Splendido Hotel is a double album by jazz guitarist Al Di Meola that was released in 1980.

== Track listing ==
All songs by Al Di Meola unless otherwise noted.

Side 1
No.	Title	Length
1.	"Alien Chase on Arabian Desert"	8:54
2.	"Silent Story in Her Eyes"	7:32

Side 2
No.	Title	Writer(s)	Length
1.	"Roller Jubilee"	Philippe Saisse	4:42
2.	"Two to Tango"		4:12
3.	"Al Di's Dream Theme"		6:48

Side 3
No.	Title	Writer(s)	Length
1.	"Dinner Music of the Gods"		8:33
2.	"Splendido Sundance"		4:48
3.	"I Can Tell"	Al Di Meola, Philippe Saisse	3:59

Side 4
No.	Title	Writer(s)	Length
1.	"Spanish Eyes"	Bert Kaempfert, Charlie Singleton, Eddie Snyder	5:07
2.	"Isfahan"	Chick Corea	11:35
3.	"Bianca's Midnight Lullaby"		1:53

== Personnel ==
- Al Di Meola – guitars, mandocello, keyboards, drums, percussion, vocals
- Chick Corea – piano
- Pete Cannarozzi – synthesizer
- Philippe Saisse – keyboards, marimba, vocals
- Jan Hammer – Moog solo on "Al Di's Dream Theme"
- Les Paul – guitar on "Spanish Eyes"
- Anthony Jackson – bass guitar
- Tim Landers – bass guitar
- Steve Gadd – drums
- Robbie Gonzalez – drums
- Eddie Colon – percussion
- Mingo Lewis – percussion
- David Campbell – violin
- Carol Shive – viola
- Dennis Karmazyn – cello
- Raymond Kelley – cello
- The Columbus Boychoir

== Chart performance ==
Year	Chart	Position
1980	Billboard 200	119
1980	Billboard Top Jazz Albums	8

== See also ==
- 1979 in jazz
