= Land of the Midnight Sun (album) =

Studio album by Al Di Meola
- Released: October 25, 1976
- Recorded: July & August 1975
- Studio: Different Fur, San Francisco, California; Electric Lady, New York City
- Genre: Jazz, Jazz fusion
- Length: 35:11
- Label: Columbia
- Producer: Al Di Meola

Al Di Meola chronology
Land of the Midnight Sun (1976)	Elegant Gypsy (1977)

Professional ratings
Review scores
Source	Rating
Allmusic	4.5/5 stars
The Rolling Stone Jazz Record Guide	3/5 stars

Land of the Midnight Sun is the debut album by jazz fusion guitarist Al Di Meola, released in 1976.

== Track listing ==
All tracks are written by Al Di Meola except where noted. Was all recorded in late 1975.

No.	Title	Writer(s)	Length
1.	"The Wizard"	Mingo Lewis	6:46
2.	"Land of the Midnight Sun"		9:10
3.	"Sarabande from Violin Sonata in B Minor"	Johann Sebastian Bach	1:20
4.	"Love Theme from Pictures of the Sea"		2:25
5.	"Suite Golden Dawn: Morning Fire/Calmer of the Tempests/From Ocean to the Clouds"		9:49
6.	"Short Tales of the Black Forest"	Chick Corea	5:41

== Personnel ==
- Al Di Meola – guitars, synthesizer, percussion, vocals
- Chick Corea – piano, marimba (6)
- Barry Miles – keyboards, synthesizer (2, 5)
- Stanley Clarke – bass guitar, vocals (4)
- Anthony Jackson – bass guitar (1, 2)
- Jaco Pastorius – bass guitar (5)
- Steve Gadd – drums (1)
- Alphonse Mouzon – drums (5)
- Lenny White – drums (2)
- Mingo Lewis – percussion (1, 2, 4, 5)
- Patty Buyukas – vocals (4)

== Chart performance ==
Year	Chart	Position
1976	Billboard 200	129
1976	Billboard Top Jazz Albums	13
