= Casino (Al Di Meola album) =

Studio album by Al Di Meola
- Released: February 1978
- Recorded: May–September 1977
- Studio: Electric Lady Studios, New York City
- Genre: Jazz fusion
- Length: 38:30
- Label: Columbia
- Producer: Al Di Meola

Al Di Meola chronology
Elegant Gypsy (1977)	Casino (1978)	Splendido Hotel (1980)

Professional ratings
Review scores
Source	Rating
Allmusic	5/5 stars
The Rolling Stone Jazz Record Guide	3/5 stars

Casino is the third album by jazz guitarist Al Di Meola. It was released in 1978.

== Track listing ==
All songs written by Al Di Meola, except where noted.

Side One

1. "Egyptian Danza" – 5:56
2. "Chasin' the Voodoo" (Mingo Lewis) – 5:05
3. "Dark Eye Tango" – 5:23

Side Two

1. "Señor Mouse" (Chick Corea) – 7:21
2. "Fantasia Suite for Two Guitars" – 5:11
  1. "Viva La Danzarina"
  2. "Guitars of the Exotic Isle"
  3. "Rhapsody Italia"
  4. "Bravoto Fantasia"
3. "Casino" – 9:29

== Charts ==
Chart (1978)	Peak position
Australian (Kent Music Report)	71

== Personnel ==
- Al Di Meola – guitars, mandolin, percussion, hand claps
- Barry Miles – keyboards, percussion
- Anthony Jackson – bass guitar
- Steve Gadd – drums
- Eddie Colon – percussion
- Mingo Lewis – percussion
