= Consequence of Chaos =

Studio album by Al Di Meola
- Released: September 26, 2006
- Studio: Di Meola 201 Studios: Clubhouse Recording Studios (Rhinebeck, New York); Avatar (New York, New York); Bennett Studios (Englewood, New Jersey)
- Genre: Jazz
- Length: 63:53
- Label: Telarc
- Producer: Al Di Meola

Al Di Meola chronology
Vocal Rendezvous (2006)	Consequence of Chaos (2006)	Diabolic Inventions and Seduction for Solo Guitar (2007)

Professional ratings
Review scores
Source	Rating
AllMusic	3.5/5 stars
All About Jazz	(positive)

Consequence of Chaos is an album by Italian-American jazz fusion and Latin jazz guitarist Al Di Meola, released in 2006. The album features guest appearances by Chick Corea, Steve Gadd, John Patitucci and Barry Miles.

== Track listing ==
All songs written by Al Di Meola.

1. "San Marco (Moderna)" – 4:54
2. "Turquoise" – 7:28
3. "Odyssey" – 0:55
4. "Tao" – 6:01
5. "Azucar – 7:46
6. "Sanctuary" – 2:09
7. "Hypnose" – 4:48
8. "Red Moon" – 4:30
9. "Cry for You" – 4:14
10. "Just Three Words – 1:19
11. "Tempest" – 9:00
12. "Storm Off-Shore" – 1:06
13. "Black Pearls" – 3:06
14. "Africana Suite" – 4:46
15. "San Marco (Vecchio)" – 1:51

== Personnel ==
- Al Di Meola – keyboards (1), acoustic guitars (1–7, 9, 10, 12–15), electric guitars (1, 3–8, 10–13), percussion (1–4, 6, 10, 12), cymbals (2, 13), keyboard programming (3, 6, 10, 12), dumbek (13), floor toms (13), marimba (14)
- Mario Parmisano – acoustic piano (1, 4, 7, 8, 11, 13), keyboards (1, 4, 7, 8, 11, 13), electric piano (8)
- Barry Miles – acoustic piano (2, 5, 13, 15), keyboards (2, 4, 5, 13, 15), marimba (2), acoustic piano solo (4)
- Chick Corea – acoustic piano solo (8), acoustic piano (9)
- John Patitucci – bass guitar (1), acoustic bass (2, 5, 13, 15)
- Victor Miranda – bass guitar (4), baby upright bass (7, 8), electric bass (11)
- Ernie Adams – drums (1, 4, 8, 11), percussion (4, 7, 11), bongos (7), congas (7)
- Steve Gadd – drums (1, 5)
- Gumbi Ortiz – congas (1, 8), percussion (7, 8, 11)
- Horváth Kornél – shaker (14), gato drum (14), udu (14)

=== Production ===
- Al Di Meola – producer, arrangements, music director
- Katsuhiko Naito – engineer, mixing
- Paul Antonell – engineer
- Lester Lovell – engineer
- Spyros Poulos – engineer
- Rich Tozzoli – engineer
- Mike Renna – assistant engineer
- Bob Ludwig – mastering at Gateway Mastering (Portland, Maine)
- Marian Loizides – production coordinator
- Anilda Carrasquillo – art direction, design
- Francesco Cabras – photography

== Charts ==
Year	Chart	Position
2006	Billboard Top Contemporary Jazz Albums	9
