= Pursuit of Radical Rhapsody =

Studio album by Al Di Meola
- Released: March 15, 2011 (Digital Download); April 8, 2011 (CD)
- Studio: Avatar (New York, New York): Churchill Studios (New Jersey); Hit Factory Criteria (North Miami, FL); Henson Recording Studios (Hollywood, California); Pannónia Stúdió (Hungary)
- Genre: Jazz fusion: Latin jazz
- Length: 72:26
- Label: Concord
- Producer: Al Di Meola

Al Di Meola chronology
World Sinfonia – La Melodia (2008)	Pursuit of Radical Rhapsody (2011)

Professional ratings
Review scores
Source	Rating
AllMusic	4/5 stars
All About Jazz	(positive)

Pursuit of Radical Rhapsody is an album by Italian-American jazz fusion and Latin jazz guitarist Al Di Meola, released in 2011.

== Track listing ==
All compositions by Al Di Meola except where noted.

1. "Siberiana" – 8:30
2. "Paramour's Lullaby" – 7:47
3. "Mawazine, Pt. 1" – 2:09
4. "Michelangelo's 7th Child" – 7:33
5. "Gumbiero" – 6:19
6. "Brave New World" – 1:54
7. "Full Frontal Contrapuntal" – 4:53
8. "That Way Before" – 3:06
9. "Fireflies" – 4:02
10. "Destination Gonzalo" – 5:17
11. "Bona" – 6:02
12. "Radical Rhapsody" – 5:03
13. "Strawberry Fields" (John Lennon, Paul McCartney) – 4:11
14. "Mawazine, Pt. 2" – 2:55
15. "Over the Rainbow" (Harold Arlen) – 3:06

== Personnel ==
World Sinfonia

- Al Di Meola – keyboards, acoustic guitars, electric guitars, percussion
- Fausto Beccalossi – accordion
- Kevin Seddiki – second guitar
- Victor Miranda – acoustic upright baby bass
- Péter Kaszás – drums, percussion
- Gumbi Ortiz – percussion

Guests and other musicians

- Barry Miles – additional keyboards, string arrangements
- Gonzalo Rubalcaba – acoustic piano (5, 10, 12, 13)
- Charlie Haden – acoustic bass (13, 15)
- Mino Cinelu – percussion (3, 4, 13, 14)
- Peter Erskine – drums (4, 10, 12)

String section

- András Sturcz – cello (4, 11, 15)
- Gyula Benkö – viola (4, 11, 15)
- Gábor Csonka – violin (4, 11, 15)
- Gergely Kuklis – violin (4)
- Viktor Uhrin – violin (4, 11, 15)

== Production ==
- Claus Altvater – executive producer, additional photography
- Al Di Meola – producer
- Hernan Romero – associate producer
- Róbert Balázs – engineer
- Tóth Bagi Csaba – engineer, additional photography
- Frank Filipetti – basic track engineer
- Roy Henderson – engineer
- Katsuhiko Naito – engineer, mixing
- Spyros Poulos – engineer
- Martin Cooke – assistant engineer
- Rick Kwan – assistant engineer
- Dave Poler – assistant engineer
- Viktor Scheer – assistant engineer
- Viktor Szabó – assistant engineer
- Paul Blakemore – mastering at CMG Mastering (Cleveland, Ohio)
- Gary Casson – business consultant
- Susie Doherty – production coordination
- Michael Page – art direction, design
- Francesco Cabras – photography

== Chart performance ==
Year	Chart	Position
2011	Billboard Top Jazz Albums	4
