= Tirami Su =

Studio album by Al Di Meola
- Released: 1987
- Recorded: April 1987
- Studio: Power Station and Atlantic Studios (New York, NY)
- Genre: Jazz, jazz fusion
- Length: 47:36
- Label: Manhattan
- Producer: Al Di Meola

Al Di Meola chronology
| Cielo e Terra (1985) | Tirami Su (1987) | Kiss My Axe (1991) |

Professional ratings
Review scores
| Source | Rating |
|---|---|
| Allmusic | 4/5 stars |

Tirami Su is an album by jazz guitarist Al Di Meola that was released in 1987.

== Track listing ==
All songs by Al Di Meola except where noted

1. "Beijing Demons" – 6:22
2. "Arabella" – 7:08
3. "Smile from a Stranger" – 5:40
4. "Rhapsody of Fire" – 5:03
5. "Song to the Pharaoh Kings" (Chick Corea) – 8:44
6. "Andonea" – 3:01
7. "Maraba" (Di Meola, Clara Sandroni) – 5:18
8. "Song with a View" – 6:20
9. "Tirami Su, Part 1" – 1:10

== Personnel ==
- Al Di Meola – guitars, arrangements
- Kei Akagi – keyboards, arrangements
- Dan Mockenstrum – Synclavier programming
- Anthony Jackson – bass guitar
- Harvie S – double bass
- Tom Brechtlein – drums
- Mino Cinelu – percussion (1–3, 5–9)
- Elizeu Felix – percussion (4)
- Roberto Bastos Pinheiro – percussion (4)
- Carlos DaSilva Pinto – percussion (4)
- Ze Renato – vocals
- Clara Sandroni – vocals

=== Production ===
- Nancy Gaelen – executive producer
- Al Di Meola – producer
- Dennis Mackay – engineer
- Ellen Fitton – assistant engineer
- Jon Goldberger – assistant engineer
- Dave O'Donnell – assistant engineer
- Bob Ludwig – mastering at Masterdisk (New York, NY)
- Dan Mockenstrum – technician
- David Baker – production assistant
- Christian Dalbavie – project coordinator
- Koppel & Scher – design
- Lu Ann Graffeo – design
- Peter Zander – photography

== Chart performance ==
| Year | Chart | Position |
|---|---|---|
| 1988 | Billboard 200 | 190 |
| 1987 | Billboard Top Contemporary Jazz Albums | 14 |
