= Mingo Lewis =

American drummer (1953–2026)

James "Mingo" Lewis
- Born: December 8, 1953; New York City, U.S.
- Died: January 27, 2026 (aged 72)
- Genres: Jazz, rock, fusion, electronic, salsa
- Occupations: Musician, songwriter
- Instruments: Drums, congas, percussion, keyboards, synthesizer
- Label: Columbia

James "Mingo" Lewis (December 8, 1953 – January 27, 2026) was an American percussionist and drummer who played with Santana, Al Di Meola (he was a band member for Di Meola's first five albums), Return to Forever, and The Tubes.

== Playing ==
Lewis played congas, bongos, timbales, vibraslap, drums, bells, güiro, gong, Syndrum, bata, tambourine, cowbell, and assorted percussion.

== Writing ==
Lewis is credited with composition of one song on four of the first five Di Meola albums: "The Wizard" on Land of the Midnight Sun, "Flight Over Rio" on Elegant Gypsy, and "Chasin' The Voodoo" on Casino (retitled from his composition Frankinsence on his 1976 album Flight Never Ending). For The Tubes album Now Lewis wrote "God-Bird-Change", which he reprised on Di Meola's Electric Rendezvous.

== Death ==
Lewis died on January 27, 2026, at the age of 72.

== Selected discography ==
=== As Band Leader ===
- Flight Never Ending (1976)

=== As session player ===
- Santana - Caravanserai (1972)
- Carlos Santana & Buddy Miles! Live! (1972)
- Return To Forever - Hymn of the Seventh Galaxy (1973)
- Carlos Santana and John McLaughlin - Love Devotion Surrender (1973)
- Billy Joel - Turnstiles (1976)
- Todd Rundgren - Nearly Human (1989)
- XTC - Skylarking (1986)

=== With Al Di Meola ===
- Land of the Midnight Sun (1976)
- Elegant Gypsy (1977)
- Casino (1978)
- Splendido Hotel (1980)
- Electric Rendezvous (1982)

=== With The Tubes ===
- Now (1977)
- What Do You Want from Live (1978)
- Remote Control (1979)
- T.R.A.S.H. (Tubes Rarities and Smash Hits) (1981)
