= Kiss My Axe =

Studio album by Al Di Meola
- Released: November 1991
- Recorded: May 1991
- Studio: Platinum Post Studios (Winter Park, Florida): Power Station and Soundtrack Studios (New York City, New York)
- Genre: Jazz fusion
- Length: 65:01
- Label: Tomato
- Producer: Al Di Meola: Barry Miles

Al Di Meola chronology
Tirami Su (1987)	Kiss My Axe (1991)	World Sinfonia (1991)

Professional ratings
Review scores
Source	Rating
Allmusic	4/5 stars

Kiss My Axe is an album by jazz guitarist Al Di Meola that was released in 1991. It is a jazz fusion album, with significant world music influences. Like its predecessor, Tirami Su (1987), it is credited to "The Al Di Meola Project", although the two albums have an almost entirely different set of backing musicians.

The album's title is a play on words on the phrase "kiss my ass", with "axe" as a common nickname for an electric guitar. Di Meola chose the title in part because of his frustration with the music industry of the time, which he felt rewarded "elevator muzak" over more adventurous music.

== Track listing ==
All songs by Al Di Meola unless otherwise noted.

1. "South Bound Traveler" (Barry Miles) – 5:22
2. "The Embrace" – 5:49
3. "Kiss My Axe" – 5:04
4. "Morocco" – 7:41
5. "Gigi's Playtime Rhyme (Interlude #1)" – 2:36
6. "One Night Last June" – 8:19
7. "Phantom" (Chick Corea, arranged by Al Di Meola) 7:53
8. "Erotic Interlude (Interlude #2)" – 2:32
9. "Global Safari" – 5:42
10. "Interlude #3" – 1:59
11. "Purple Orchids" – 6:45
12. "The Prophet (Interlude #4)" – 1:16
13. "Oriana (September 24, 1988)" – 5:19

== Personnel ==
- Al Di Meola – electric guitars (1–3, 6, 7, 9, 11, 13), Roland GR-50 guitar synthesizer (1–3, 5, 6, 8, 11), Roland S-770 (2, 5, 9, 10, 12), Korg M1 heavy drums (2), shakers (2), flamenco guitar (4), cymbals (4, 13), handclaps (4), Yamaha TG77 (5, 8, 10), acoustic guitar (5, 8), percussion (5), electric nylon guitar (7), Korg M1 (8, 12), Roland S-77 keyboard (8), Macintosh IIC (8, 10, 12), AKS: s-hr16b (10), Korg Wavestation (12), sequencing (12)
- Barry Miles – Yamaha grand piano (1–4, 6, 9, 13), Korg M1 (1, 2, 11), Roland S-770 (1, 4), Yamaha TG77 (1, 9), Synclavier (1, 6, 9), Yamaha acoustic piano (7), synthesizer programming (4), handclaps (4), synthesizers (11, 13)
- Dan Mockensturm – Synclavier programming
- Rachel Z – synthesizers (3, 6, 7, 9, 11)
- Anthony Jackson – 6-string contrabass (1, 3, 7, 9, 11)
- Tony Scherr – electric bass (2, 11), acoustic bass (6)
- Richie Morales – drums (2, 6)
- Omar Hakim – drums (3, 9)
- Arto Tunçboyacıyan – percussion (1–3, 6, 7, 11, 13), voice (1–4, 7, 13), bongos (3, 6, 11), handclaps (4), triangles (7), batá (9)
- Gumbi Ortiz – congas (2, 3, 6, 7, 11), handclaps (4), batá (9)
- Oriana Di Meola – baby talk (5)

=== Production ===
- Kip Kaplan – executive producer
- Al Di Meola – producer, arrangements
- Barry Miles – co-producer, arrangements
- Frank Filipetti – engineer
- Vittorio Zammarano – additional engineer
- Todd Carpenter – assistant engineer
- Victor Deyglio – assistant engineer
- Mark Mason – assistant engineer
- Sean Haines – live computer programmer equipment manager
- Bob Ludwig – mastering at Masterdisk (New York, NY)
- Milton Glaser – design
- Henry Wolf – photography
- Alia Jordan – model

== Chart performance ==
Year	Chart	Position
1991	Billboard Top Contemporary Jazz Albums	2
