= World Sinfonia =

Studio album by Al Di Meola
- Released: 1991
- Recorded: October 1990
- Studio: Tracking Zone, Soundtrack Studios and Sound On Sound (New York, NY)
- Genre: Jazz fusion
- Length: 62:58
- Label: Tomato

Al Di Meola chronology
Kiss My Axe (1991)	World Sinfonia (1991)	Heart of the Immigrants (1993)

Professional ratings
Review scores
Source	Rating
Allmusic	4.5/5 stars

World Sinfonia is an album by jazz fusion guitarist Al Di Meola that was released in 1991.

== Track listing ==
1. "Perpetual Emotion " (Al Di Meola) – 3:30
2. "Orient Blue" (Di Meola) – 2:57
3. "Tango Suite Part I" (Ástor Piazzolla) – 8:49
4. "Tango Suite Part III" (Piazzolla) – 8:50
5. "Falling Grace" (Steve Swallow) – 4:21
6. "Last Tango for Astor" (Di Meola) – 6:20
7. "No Mystery" (Chick Corea) – 12:37
8. "Lustrine" (Dino Saluzzi) – 9:12
9. "Little Cathedral" (Di Meola, Augustin Barrios) – 1:45
10. "La Cathedral" (Barrios) – 4:37

== Personnel ==
- Al Di Meola – acoustic guitar, acoustic nylon guitar, arrangements (3, 4, 7, 9, 10)
- Chris Carrington – classical guitar, arrangements (9, 10)
- Dino Saluzzi – bandoneón
- Gumbi Oritz – percussion, congas
- Arto Tunçboyacıyan – percussion, vocals

=== Production ===
- Al Di Meola – producer
- Scott Ansell – engineer
- David Baker – engineer
- Joe Ferla – engineer
- Sean Haines – assistant engineer, technical assistant
- Michael Nuceder – assistant engineer
- Bob Ludwig – mastering at Masterdisk (New York, NY)
- Kip Kaplan – project coordinator
- Milton Glaser, Inc. – design
- Stephen Wilkes – cover and artist photography
- Terri Bloom – musician and studio photography
- Bill Milkowski – liner notes

== Charts ==
Year	Chart	Position
1991	Billboard Top Contemporary Jazz Albums	10
