= Friday Night in San Francisco =

Live album by Al Di Meola, John McLaughlin, Paco de Lucía
- Released: 1981
- Recorded: December 5, 1980 ("Guardian Angel" recorded May 1981 at Minot Sound, White Plains, New York)
- Venue: The Warfield, San Francisco, California
- Genre: New flamenco; jazz
- Length: 41:02
- Label: Columbia/Sony Music Entertainment
- Producer: Al Di Meola; John McLaughlin; Paco de Lucía

Al Di Meola, John McLaughlin, Paco de Lucía chronology
Friday Night in San Francisco (1981)	Passion, Grace and Fire (1983)

John McLaughlin chronology
Belo Horizonte (1981)	Friday Night in San Francisco (1981)	Music Spoken Here (1982)

Professional ratings
Review scores
Source	Rating
Allmusic	4.5/5 stars
The Rolling Stone Jazz Record Guide	4/5 stars
The Penguin Guide to Jazz Recordings	3/4 stars

Friday Night in San Francisco is a 1981 live album by Al Di Meola, John McLaughlin and Paco de Lucía. It was described by jazz author and critic Walter Kolosky as "a musical event that could be compared to the Benny Goodman Band's performance at Carnegie Hall in 1938 … [it] may be considered the most influential of all live acoustic guitar albums".

All the tracks except "Guardian Angel" were recorded live at the Warfield Theatre on 5 December 1980, in San Francisco; "Guardian Angel" was recorded at Minot Sound, in White Plains, New York.

== Track listing ==
1. "Mediterranean Sundance / Rio Ancho" (Al Di Meola, Paco de Lucía) – 11:31
2. "Short Tales of the Black Forest" (Chick Corea) – 8:43
3. "Frevo Rasgado" (Egberto Gismonti) – 7:55
4. "Fantasia Suite" (Al Di Meola) – 8:50
5. "Guardian Angel" (John McLaughlin) – 4:01

== Personnel ==
- Al Di Meola – acoustic steel-string guitar
- John McLaughlin – acoustic nylon-string guitar (played w/ flatpick)
- Paco de Lucía – spanish guitar

== Position of performers ==
Track	Left channel	Middle Channel	Right channel
Mediterranean Sundance	Paco De Lucia		Al Di Meola
Short Tales Of The Black Forest	John McLaughlin		Al Di Meola
Frevo Rasgado	John McLaughlin		Paco De Lucia
Fantasia Suite	Paco De Lucia	John McLaughlin	Al Di Meola
Guardian Angel	Paco De Lucia	John McLaughlin	Al Di Meola

== Charts ==
1981 chart performance for Friday Night in San Francisco
Chart (1981)	Peak position
Australian Albums (Kent Music Report)	100
Austrian Albums (Ö3 Austria)	5
German Albums (Offizielle Top 100)	22
New Zealand Albums (RMNZ)	48
US Top LPs & Tape (Billboard)	97
US Top Jazz LPs (Billboard)	6

2014 chart performance for Friday Night in San Francisco
Chart (2014)	Peak position
Dutch Albums (Album Top 100)	66
French Albums (SNEP)	154
Italian Albums (FIMI)	55
