= Scenario (album) =

Studio album by Al Di Meola
- Released: 1983
- Studio: Caribou Ranch (Nederland, Colorado)
- Genre: Jazz, jazz fusion
- Length: 40:28
- Label: Columbia
- Producer: Dennis Mackay: Al Di Meola

Al Di Meola chronology
Tour De Force – Live (1982)	Scenario (1983)	Soaring Through a Dream (1985)

Professional ratings
Review scores
Source	Rating
AllMusic	2.5/5 stars
The Rolling Stone Jazz Record Guide	4/5 stars

Scenario is an album by jazz guitarist Al Di Meola, released in 1983. Musicians include keyboardist Jan Hammer, bassist Tony Levin and drummers Bill Bruford and Phil Collins.

== Track listing ==
1. "Mata Hari" (Al Di Meola) – 6.04
2. "African Night" (Di Meola, Jan Hammer) – 4.51
3. "Island Dreamer" (Hammer) – 4.06
4. "Scenario" (Di Meola) – 3.56
5. "Sequencer" (Hammer) – 4.06
6. "Cachaca" (Di Meola) – 5.34
7. "Hypnotic Conviction" (Di Meola, Hammer) – 3.51
8. "Calliope" (Di Meola) – 4.19
9. "Scoundrel" (Di Meola, Hammer) – 3.44

Jan Hammer would re-use the drum sample that figures prominently in "Sequencer" in his better-known theme for the TV series Miami Vice, which first aired two years after the release of this album.

== Personnel ==
- Al Di Meola – electric guitars (1, 5–9), Roland guitar synthesizer (1, 2, 6–9), mandocello (1), tom tom (1), acoustic guitar (3, 4), 12-string guitar (3), Hawaiian chordophone (3), Fairlight CMI [saxophone & synth flute] (6), drums (6)
- Jan Hammer – keyboards (1–3, 5–7, 9), Fairlight CMI, electric bass (1), LinnDrum (1, 2, 5–7, 9), Roland drum machine (1–3, 5, 6, 9), Moog bass (2), acoustic piano (4)
- Will Alexander – Fairlight CMI programming
- Tony Levin – stick bass (8)
- Phil Collins – drums (3)
- Bill Bruford – Simmons electronic drums (8)

=== Production ===
- Philip Roberge – executive producer
- Al Di Meola – producer
- Dennis Mackay – co-producer, engineer
- Jerry Mahler – assistant engineer
- Rick Markowitz – assistant engineer
- Bernie Grundman – mastering at A&M Studios (Hollywood, California)
- John Berg – album design
- David Michael Kennedy – photography

== Chart performance ==
Year	Chart	Position
1983	Billboard 200	128
1983	Billboard Top Jazz Albums	8
