= Mario Parmisano =

Argentinian jazz pianist (born 1960)

Mario Parmisano (born June 18, 1960, Buenos Aires), is an Argentinian jazz pianist. He is recognized on the international scene for his work with guitarist Al Di Meola and for his Tango Jazz Trio, performing a unique interpretation about the Music of the Great Tango Master Astor Piazzolla.

== Career ==
Parmisano started his professional career in the early 1980s, playing with artists including Pedro Aznar, David Lebón, Silvina Garré, Estela Raval and Sergio Denis.

In 1993, he moved to New York and immediately began to play with Di Meola. He participated as pianist-arranger-composer and associate producer, on many of his recordings. Along with Di Meola he played with Herbie Hancock, Chick Corea, Steve Gadd, Peter Erskine, Manú Katché, Anthony Jackson, John Patitucci, Marc Johnson, Pino Palladino, and the Toronto Symphony Orchestra.

During 15 years of touring, Parmisano performed at the Vienna Opera House, jazz festivals including Montreal, Montreux, JVC, Heineken, North-sea Jazz and the Blue Note. He has given nearly 2,000 concerts, with Al Di Meola's Electric Project and the Acoustic Group: World Sinfonia. He performed with The Amadeus Chamber Orchestra from Poland, the Symphony Orchestra from Kiew-Ukraine and the Moscow Symphony Orchestra, at the Peter Tchaikovsky Hall in Moscow.

In 2007, Parmisano return to Argentina, recording his 2nd album A mis Viejos in La Trastienda, Buenos Aires, and also at the John Anson Ford Amphitheatre in Hollywood, Los Angeles.

Parmisano performed his “Tribute to Piazzolla” for the past few years in many countries with artists including Yellow Jackets, Michel Camilo, Abraham Laboriel, Paco de Lucia and Chamber Orchestra Kremlin. He gave a concert with the Symphony Orchestra of the Institute Superior of Art, conducted by Francisco Noya, Director of the Berklee College of Music, at Teatro Colón of Buenos Aires.

He recorded Michelangelo with Jorge Oss on bass and Lucas Canel on drums, which was nominated for the Carlos Gardel Awards 2012.

In 2014, Parmisano rejoined Di Meola's group for another European tour.

In Argentina Mozarteum Argentino invited Parmisano and his Tango Jazz Trio (with Damián Vernis on bass) to perform at the Auditorio Juan Victoria, San Juan.

Parmisano released his Forever Astor CD performing Piazzolla compositions, with his Argentinean Trio (Lucas Canel and Vernis), Abraham Laboriel, Paul Wertico, Bob Franceschini and Mike Pope.

The Mozarteum Argentino organized a concert with Parmisano and Tango Jazz Trio at the Teatro Gran Rex, in Buenos Aires. In 2015 he played on Di Meola's release Elysium and the subsequent tour. Afterwards Parmisano presented an All Star Trio with Wertico and Pope, performing at the Victoria Auditorium and the Bebop Jazz Club in Buenos Aires.

In August 2019, Mario was invited to perform at the Mexico Jazz Festival with Ivan Barrera (Bass) and Enrique Nativitas (Drums. October 2019, for first time in Madrid, at the Sala Clamores Jazz, with Alex Berta (Bass) and Juanma Barroso (Drums). January 2020, Mario presents Piazzolla´s Music in solo Piano, with 2 Concerts in Geneva and Zurich, Switzerland, also in Madrid. Release in all Digital Platforms the CD ¨Your Inner Power¨, all compositions by Mario, on Warner Chappell Music Argentina.

In 2021, Mario release his latest CD ¨Piazzolla Centenario¨, and is invited by Guitarist Roman Miroshnichenko to perform in Russia, at the World of Guitar Festival, celebrating Piazzolla´s Centenary next to the Moscow Symphony Orchestra. He also performed his solo Piano project presenting his CD ¨Piazzolla Centenario¨, in several Jazz Clubs in Madrid.

== Awards ==
The Legislature of Buenos Aires awarded him Outstanding Personality of the Culture of Buenos Aires.
