= Al Di Meola =

American jazz fusion guitarist (born 1954)

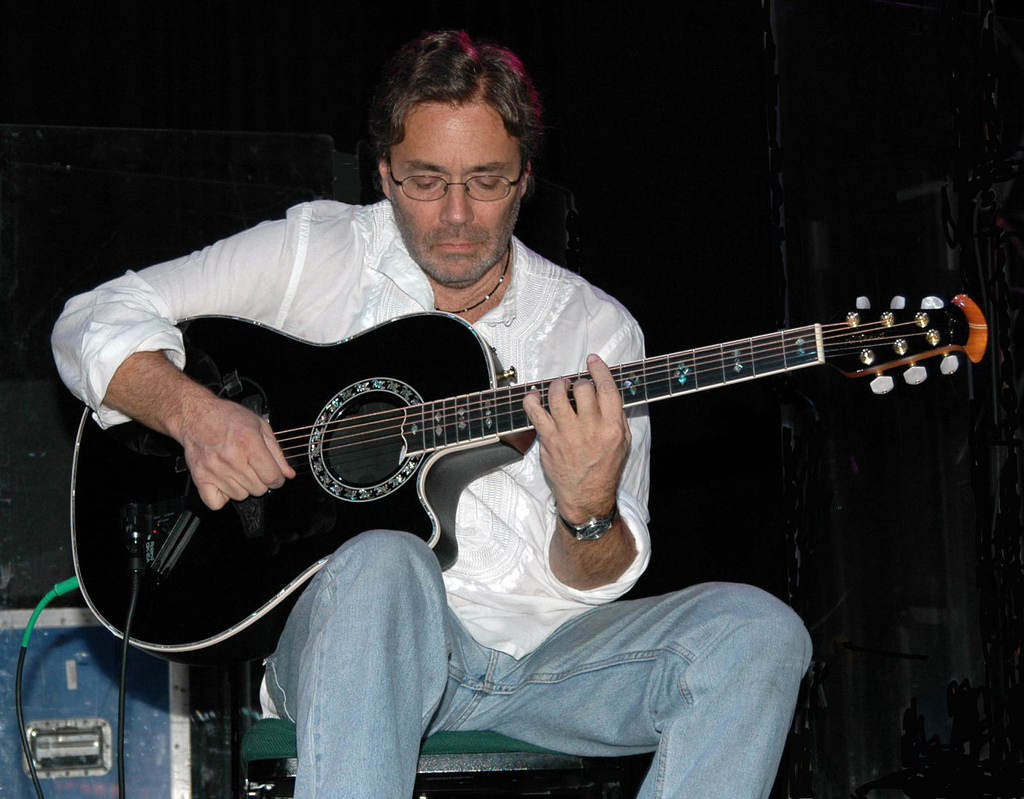
- Al Di Meola at the Granada Theater, Dallas, Texas, December 6, 2006

Background information
- Born: Albert Laurence Di Meola; July 22, 1954 (age 72); Jersey City, New Jersey, U.S.
- Genres: Jazz; jazz fusion; world music; world fusion; Latin jazz
- Occupations: Songwriter; composer; musician
- Instrument: Guitar
- Works: Al Di Meola discography
- Years active: 1974 – present
- Labels: Columbia; Telarc; Tomato; earMUSIC; Manhattan; Atlantic; Concord
- Formerly of: Return to Forever; Go
- Website: aldimeola.com

Albert Laurence Di Meola (born July 22, 1954) is an American guitarist. Known for his work in jazz fusion and world music, he had his breakthrough after joining Chick Corea's Return to Forever group in 1974. He launched, from 1976 afterwards, a successful and critically acclaimed solo career, noted for his technical mastery, complex compositions and explorations of Latin music. Highlights of his work are Elegant Gypsy, his Friday Night in San Francisco collaboration and the World Sinfonia trilogy.

An alumnus of Berklee College of Music and a Grammy Award winner, Di Meola's career includes collaborations with musicians such as, besides Corea, Stanley Clarke, Larry Coryell, Paul Simon, Steve Winwood, Jaco Pastorius, Paco de Lucía, Bill Bruford, John McLaughlin, Jan Hammer, Jean-Luc Ponty, Steve Vai and others.

== Early life ==
Born in Jersey City, New Jersey, into an Italian family with roots in Cerreto Sannita, a small town northeast of Benevento, Di Meola grew up in Bergenfield, where he attended Bergenfield High School. He has been a resident of Old Tappan, New Jersey.

When Di Meola was eight years old, his discovery of Elvis Presley and the Ventures inspired him to start playing guitar. Hearing The Beatles for the first time, though, was what truly cemented his desire to become a musician. His older sister introduced them to Al on the family's 1963 Christmas, through their Meet the Beatles! LP. "Listening to that album really changed my life", said Di Meola. Watching their string of appearances on The Ed Sullivan Show, two months later, further strengthened his drive. Di Meola started his classes with guitar teacher Robert "Bob" Aslanian, who directed him toward jazz standards. He was also trained in theory, reading and other useful skills. "He was my biggest influence", he said of his first teacher. As a teenager, Di Meola practiced guitar eight to ten hours per day.

By the late 1960s, Di Meola became keenly aware of the rock explosion. Aside from British Invasion acts such as The Rolling Stones and The Who, he was particularly fond of the stateside acts coming from California. He was a fan of country rock acts such as The Byrds, Flying Burrito Brothers and Crosby, Stills and Nash, as well as the Bay Area psychedelic rock scene, namely Moby Grape, Quicksilver Messenger Service, Jefferson Airplane and the Grateful Dead. "I loved all those bands", he said.

One particular music group from San Francisco, said Al Di Meola, that had a definite "influence on me growing up" was Santana.

Carlos always had a tone that everyone strived for, actually everyone dreamed of because striving didn't mean we ever got it. People dreamed of that tone, it was wonderful. He was a guy I listened to in high school and that I admired so much because I loved the whole Latin element and the drive of their rock thing with the Latin percussion.

Another defining moment from his early life came through feeling ostracized on his high school years, because of his unique playing style. He tells:

It might sound funny, but that whole feeling of rejection made me mad! There was this one group that we had that I was kind of happy with and proud to be with, but it broke up and re-formed a week later – without me in it. It was just a ploy to get me out of the band. I was very upset and very mad by that, so I vowed: ‘I will show these guys!’ I locked myself in my bedroom and practiced like a madman, out of inner rage. And that summer, in the space of a few months, I learned more than anyone can learn in two or three years. I mean, I got down and practiced 10 to 12 hours a day, nonstop.

Although he appreciated the "whole package" of late 1960s and early 1970s rock icons such as Eric Clapton, Jimi Hendrix, Jimmy Page and Carlos Santana, he never saw them as role models. "I never thought of the rock players as having good technique", he said. Alternatively, Di Meola was inspired by jazz guitarists George Benson, Tal Farlow and Kenny Burrell, and country guitarists such as Clarence White and Doc Watson. His musical direction solidified when exposed to jazz rock pioneers Larry Coryell and John McLaughlin. Di Meola elaborates on Coryell's influence, acknowledging that his "unique approach" gave him the "confidence to continue in my direction." Seeing Coryell and other jazz musicians live in NYC not only was "a real thrill", but also a "turning point." Of McLaughlin, he praised him as "the first guitarist I heard to combine tremendous amount of emotion with incredible technique."

== Career ==
=== 1970s ===
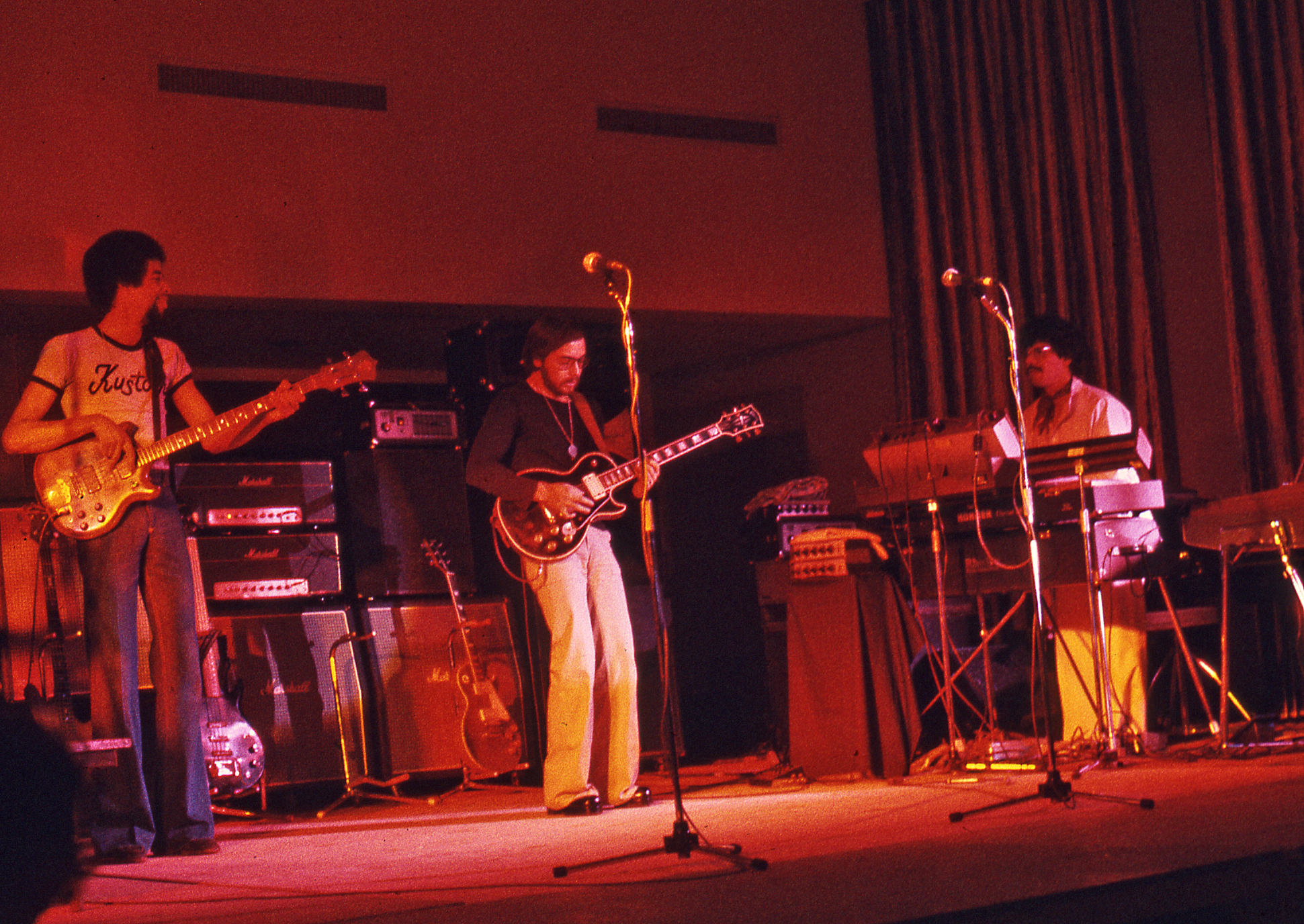
Di Meola with Return to Forever at Onondaga Community College, Syracuse, New York, 1974

He attended Berklee College of Music in 1971. There, he practiced up to eight hours a day. At nineteen, he was hired by Chick Corea to replace Bill Connors in the pioneering jazz fusion band Return to Forever with Stanley Clarke and Lenny White. Of joining the group, he said:

It was a dream come true. It was my favorite group. Chick was my favorite writer. I was in probably the greatest group for an electric guitar player possible. Chick was writing the most incredible music for electric guitar. And I was in the forefront. I was the guy who got the hippest guitar parts on the planet Earth at the time.

Di Meola then compared Corea's band to John McLaughlin's Mahavishnu Orchestra, the group that inspired Corea to take Return to Forever into a rockier, high-octane direction. He argued:

Mahavishnu was not a compositional band. Go back and listen to their records – all they were doing was blowing. It was just tons of improvising and playing at fast tempos. But [Return to Forever] was a composition band, way more than Mahavishnu and Weather Report. It was really classical, rock and jazz, with tons of structure and parts, and the guitar in the forefront. It was great and really challenging. I took it very seriously.

His short, two-year period with Return to Forever proved to be the group's career peak. He recorded three albums with the quartet, helping them earn its greatest commercial success as all three albums cracked the Top 40 on the U.S. Billboard pop albums chart.

No Mystery's title track won a Grammy for the Best Jazz Performance By A Group, but the band didn't show up for the event because they firmly believed they wouldn't win. Jazz singer Ella Fitzgerald presented the prize.

Di Meola recorded with Larry Coryell on Lenny White's solo debut album, Venusian Summer (1975). Di Meola and Coryell traded solos on "Prince of the Sea", the album's last track. The pairing caused a stir in the fusion community, with fans wondering who played what solo. Coryell reveals this was the only time he and Di Meola played together with electric guitars.

In early 1976, Return to Forever released an album Romantic Warrior. Debuting at No. 170, it peaked at No. 35 in May, spending three weeks on the Billboard Top 40 and a total of 15 weeks on Billboard 200. Fourteen years later it won a gold RIAA certification for selling an excess of 500,000 copies. The album, as a whole, has been considered Chick Corea's answer to Rick Wakeman's successful The Myths and Legends of King Arthur and the Knights of the Round Table (1975), either by its medieval themes or its prog rock leanings.

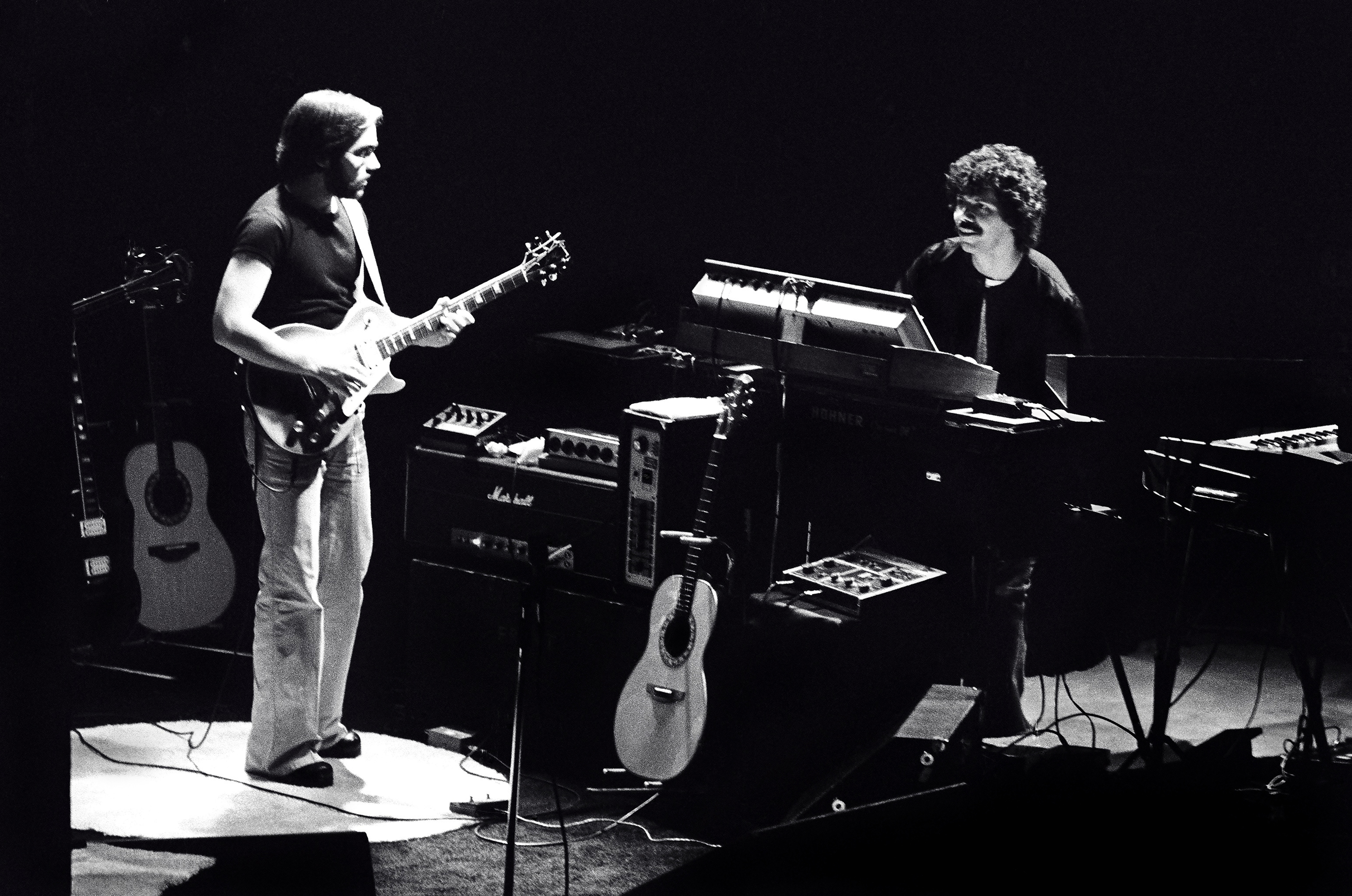
Di Meola with Chick Corea in Rochester, New York, 1976

At the height of Return to Forever's popularity, Chick Corea decided to break up the group. The main reason for its sudden demise was the other band members' involvement in side-projects; White, Clarke and Di Meola were already investing in their solo works, with their labels and management backing up their new career moves, which may have hampered the progress of the main band.

Corea's deep involvement with Scientology might also have played a part in the end of Return to Forever's classic lineup. When asked, band members avoided the issue, although Clarke leaving Scientology at the time could have influenced the turn of events.

As Return to Forever was disbanding around 1976, Di Meola recorded his first solo album, Land of the Midnight Sun (1976). Former members of Return to Forever, and newcomer bassist Jaco Pastorius notably collaborated with the recording. Early on, Di Meola was noted for his technical mastery and extremely fast, complex guitar solos and compositions, and his exploration of Mediterranean cultures and acoustic genres like flamenco and the classical guitar repertoire.

To market his sophomore album, Elegant Gypsy (1977), Di Meola did an American tour with Weather Report, when Jaco Pastorius had joined the band. Both his and Weather Report's Heavy Weather album came out the same week on Columbia Records. Heavily promoted by the label, the tour was a success, with sold-out shows across the country. Elegant Gypsy reached #5 on the Billboard Top Jazz Albums chart, #58 on the Billboard 200 pop albums chart, and eventually went gold.

From 1976 to 1978 he played with Stomu Yamashta in the supergroup Go on three records.

Di Meola's final solo album of the 1970s, Casino (1978), featured the song "Egyptian Danza", which blended ancient and current Egyptian influences with exotic middle-eastern themes and Latin congas.

=== 1980s ===
1980 saw Di Meola release the double album Splendido Hotel, which had been recorded throughout 1979.

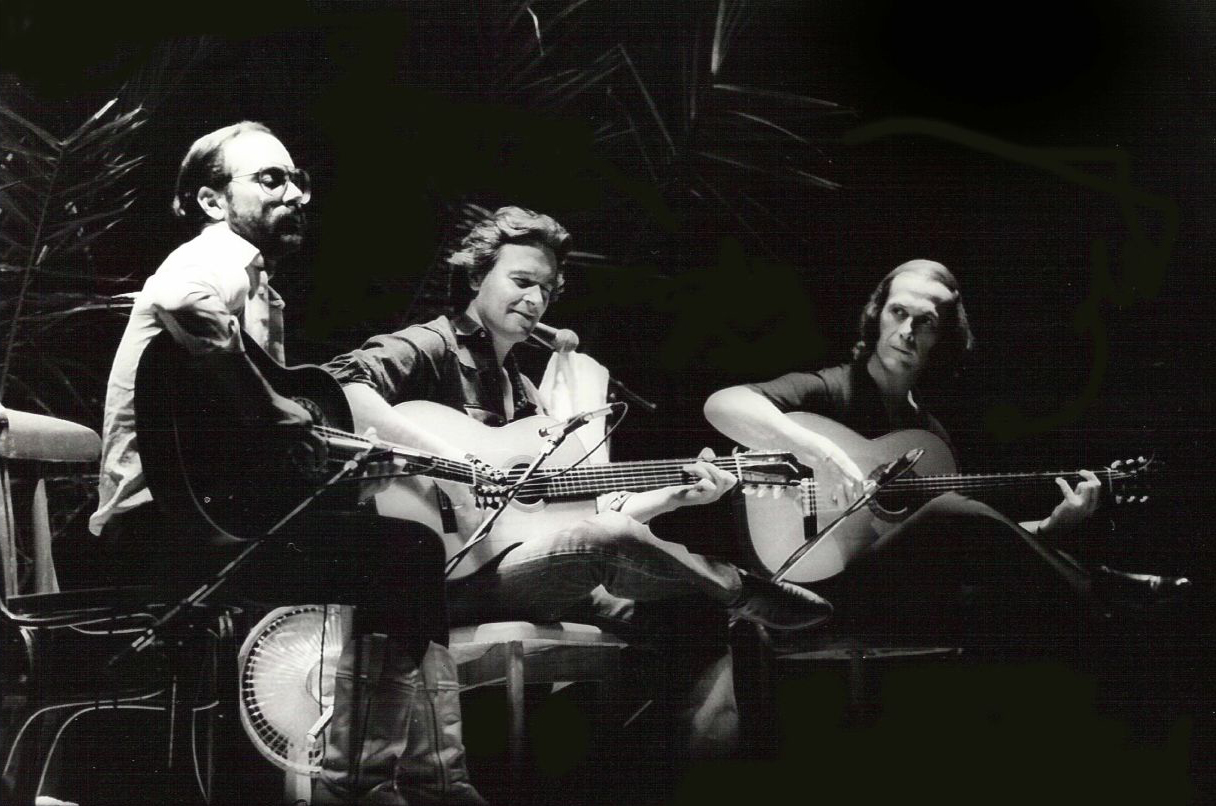
Al Di Meola, John McLaughlin, and Paco de Lucía performing in Barcelona, Spain in the 1980s

Shortly after, Di Meola and Paco de Lucía were approached to do a tour with Leo Kottke. Weeks later, a better proposition turned up: a 2-month European tour with John McLaughlin. Di Meola became friendly with Paco, yet he never became quite close to McLaughlin. Di Meola revealed that the British guitarist was fiercely competitive, wary of being replaced as fusion's premiere guitarist. "It was like going into a boxing match and he's out to kill you", said Di Meola of McLaughlin's ruthless attitude. That fueled a six-stringed rivalry that largely benefited the audience.

In 1980, Di Meola recorded the best-selling Friday Night in San Francisco live album with John McLaughlin and Paco de Lucía. Still a popular album, it went on to sell seven million copies worldwide.

The trio reconvened in 1982 to record a studio album, Passion, Grace & Fire (1983). In the Spanish remaster of the album, flamenco scholars José Manuel Gamboa and Faustino Nuñez weigh in their impressions on the liner notes. Though somewhat lacking the "warmth" of the live setting of their debut, Passion, Grace & Fire is a more balanced effort. The three performers contributed with two compositions each.

1982 was also the year Di Meola released his first live album, Tour De Force. It notably featured former Mahavishnu Orchestra keyboard player Jan Hammer on the line-up, with sidemen Anthony Jackson on bass, Mingo Lewis handling the percussion and Steve Gadd on drums. Along with music from preceding albums, it featured a previously unreleased Di Meola track ("Nena") and two Hammer compositions, "Advantage" and "Cruisin'" from Electric Rendezvous. The studio version was marketed as a single.

After touring straight for ten years the guitarist took some time off in 1984. Di Meola felt he had reached a dead end in his career, both with his fusion work and the acoustic trio. On his words:

With [Paco and John], it got to the point where I was trying to come up with another spectacular run as fast as I could play it, designed to drive the audience berserk. And you know, I'd come up with something. But the music reached a plateau where it wasn't working. There wasn't anywhere else you could go after that.

Around this time, DiMeola also left Columbia Records. He would release his next three albums on Manhattan Records.

Di Meola produced Magic Touch (1985), Stanley Jordan's Blue Note debut. The record spent 51 weeks at No. 1 on Billboard's jazz chart, and went gold almost 20 years after its release. It garnered Grammy nominations in two categories: Best Jazz Instrumental Performance, Soloist and Best Jazz Fusion Performance, Vocal Or Instrumental. Di Meola granted Stanley Jordan had a "phenomenal" approach to guitar tapping, taking it "into another dimension."

The latter half of the 1980s came with noticeable shifts in Di Meola's music. He now incorporated vocals and the Synclavier guitar synthesizer, weaving these into his compositions. Also, since playing with McLaughlin and Paco de Lucía, he rethought "aggressive" and "loud" sets. Di Meola seemed to have left fusion definitely behind after the subdued, all-acoustic Cielo e Terra (1985). That was the start of a "Brazilian" phase of sorts. Already a long-time MPB enthusiast, Di Meola name-checked Egberto Gismonti and Milton Nascimento on interviews. In Cielo e Terra, he collaborated with drummer and percussionist Airto Moreira. By then, Moreira had a stellar track record in jazz fusion, having recorded and performed with Miles Davis and Chick Corea.

Tirami Su (1987) continued Di Meola's infatuation with MPB. This time around Airto Moreira wasn't available, which led the guitarist to a fruitful collaboration with singer and songwriter Zé Renato. The Brazilian composer spent one month in New York City jamming and recording, doing mostly non-lyrical vocalizations to the music. Zé Renato then toured with the Al Di Meola Project across Europe and the USA. Tirami Su also featured guest singer Clara Sandroni, whom Di Meola discovered through Milton Nascimento's Encontros e Despedidas (1985).

Di Meola was one of the select invitees to Les Paul's 72nd birthday celebration on June 8, 1987, at NYC's Hard Rock Cafe. He was invited to an impromtu jam with Les Paul and Jimmy Page, who earlier played over a 12-bar blues progression with Les Pauls' sidemen, playing riffs in the vein of Willie Dixon's "I Can't Quit You Baby". Other attendees included Bo Diddley, John Sebastian, Rick Derringer, Robby Krieger, Jeff Beck, Nile Rodgers and Elliot Easton. The party generated a buzz that reached mainstream press, and it became a newsworthy topic for weeks to come. Les Paul's birthday helped him become a household name once again.

=== 1990s ===
Except for the occasional electric guitar foray on albums such as 1991's Kiss My Axe, he spent most of the next fifteen years both exploring acoustic and world music. Di Meola stated that part ("more than 50 percent") of the reason for stepping away from the electric guitar is due to hearing damage from years of playing at excessive volumes.

In the mid-1990s Di Meola, Stanley Clarke and Jean-Luc Ponty worked for five weeks on what became The Rite of Strings album. Their world tour included a South American leg, starting at Argentinan capital Buenos Aires, where they played for 7,000-strong crowd at the Luna Park stadium. They proceeded to visit Brazil for five dates: two on São Paulo and one each in Rio de Janeiro, Curitiba and Porto Alegre.

The "fearsome threesome" of Di Meola, Paco de Lucía and John McLaughlin reunited for a final time for The Guitar Trio (1996). Although the record and its tour were a successful endeavour, frequent personality clashes ensued due to musical differences. The process was especially challenging for Di Meola as he lost his mother, Theresa, in the summer of 1996. The trio eventually grew used to one another again, and developed a healthy competitiveness that made "life on the road" possible.

=== 2000s ===
Di Meola continued his successful streak in Germany, being awarded yet another gold album for World Sinfonía III – The Grande Passion (2000).

Di Meola released Super Guitar Trio and Friends (TDK) in 2001.

Di Meola rediscovered his love of the electric guitar in 2006, and the DVD of his concert at the Leverkusen Jazz Festival 2006 is subtitled Return to Electric Guitar.

Return to Forever reunited in 2009. The incentive initially came from Chick Corea's participation on Al Di Meola's Consequence of Chaos (2006). Di Meola pitched the idea to Corea, and the others came on board. Things went sour during the mixing stage of their live album, Returns (2009). Corea and Clarke mixed down Di Meola's guitar.

=== 2010s ===
On July 10, 2013, Di Meola played at the 33rd edition of Spain's Festival de la Guitarras de Córdoba. Approximately 25,000 people attended the event. Other participants included Michael Schenker, Fito y Fitipaldis, Tomatito Sexteto and Robert Cray.

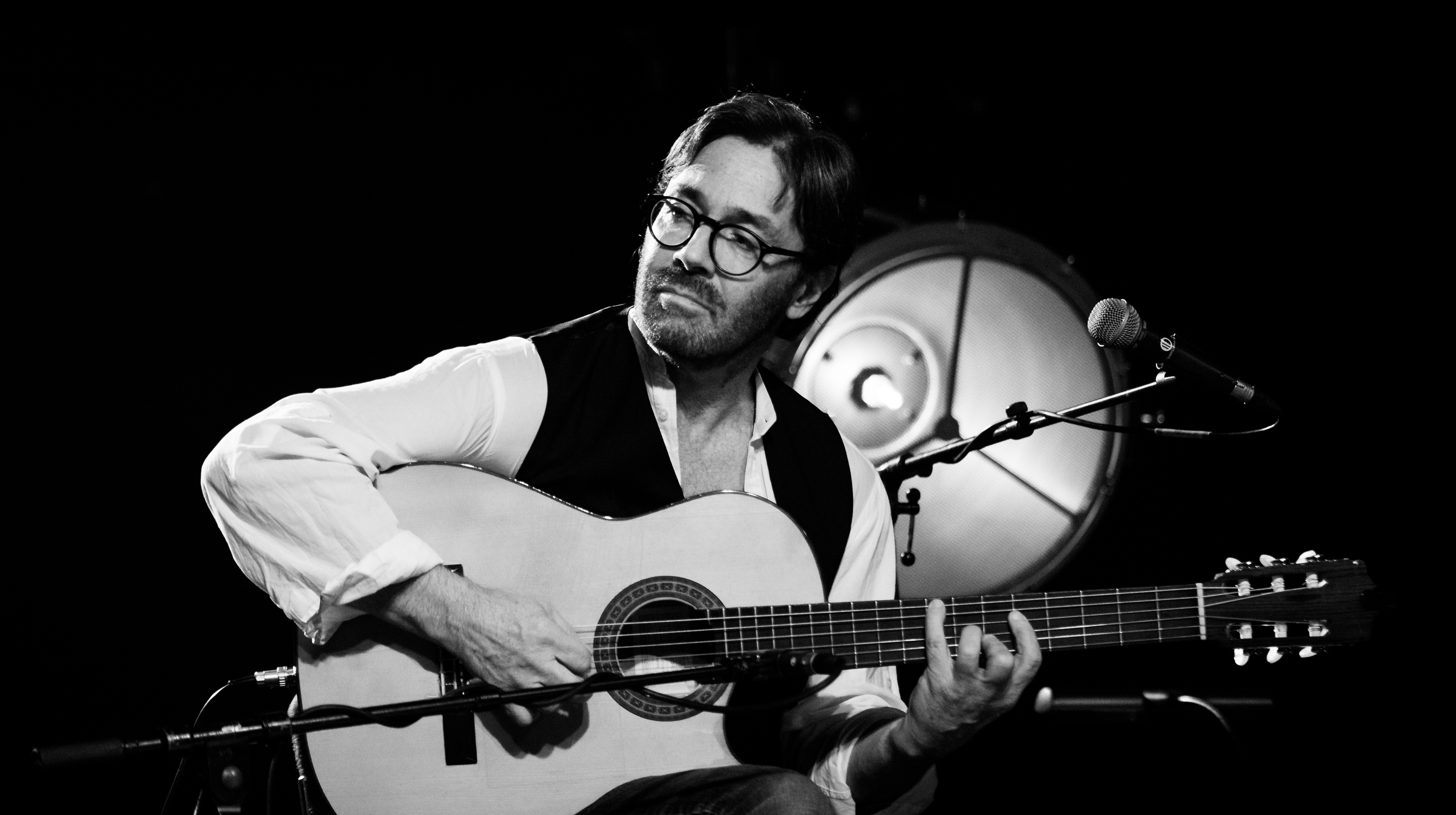
Di Meola at Leverkusener Jazztage (Forum/Leverkusen/Germany) on November 7, 2016

Di Meola returned to Spain in 2017, to the IV Encuentro Internacional de Guitarra Paco de Lucía. The festival was held in Algeciras, Paco's birthplace, from 17th to 22 July. For Di Meola's only presentation in Spain that year, he made the "World Sinfonia" show.

In 2018, Di Meola was awarded an honorary doctorate of music from his alma mater, Berklee College of Music.

=== 2020s ===
On January 11, 2023, Di Meola wrote a heartfelt eulogy for Jeff Beck in his official Facebook page. "There was no one like Jeff", he said, praising his "most unique style." He reminisced how he grew up listening to Truth (1968) and Beck-Ola (1969). He also remembered how he loved Beck's 1976-1979 visits to his Hammersmith Odeon shows on London.

Di Meola released Twentyfour in 2024.

== Personal life ==
After a head injury when still a child, Di Meola developed a case of tinnitus. His time touring, especially with Return to Forever, worsened it. Although he had no hearing loss, he does experience the ringing sensation in his ears, typical of this condition, and the very high frequencies were compromised.

Di Meola said that middle-class New Jersey "was the perfect place to grow up." Living close to New York, he could go to the city's record stores and music clubs. "The greatest shows any night of the week". He visited Bill Graham's Fillmore East in Greenwich Village to see rock bands "on a weekly basis". He also went to NYC's jazz clubs and Latin clubs, "soaking it all in".

In July 2016, Di Meola married Stephanie Kreis ; they met after a 2013 concert of his in Budapest. Di Meola has two daughters from two previous marriages, Oriana and Valentina. He also has a daughter, Ava, with Stephanie. Additionally, he is the grandfather of Valentina's son, Orion.

From 2019 onwards, Di Meola and family devised the A Fine Taste and Music house events. The idea came about after a dinner with friends, when he suggested to his wife that they livestream him cooking one of his "special Italian dishes." They did, and the guitarist joked to his viewers: “If you like what you see you can come here, live in person! I'll cook and we can talk and we can have dinner together." Much to his surprise, people from around the world, including Africa, Asia, and South America, took them seriously, inquiring the cost of such an event. The Di Meolas did a total of 10 dinners before putting them on hold, because of COVID-19 restrictions.

Stephanie Di Meola devised three different A Fine Taste packages. The top package – the "Diamond" plan – includes dinner, a private show and a jam session, where guests get to play with one of Al's famous guitars. These encompass his black '71 Les Paul Custom, from his Return to Forever days, and the ‘59 Les Paul he used in Kiss My Axe. The setlist for the pocket show is taken from previous solo albums, Beatles songs and "new stuff." According to Di Meola, "it's a chance for me to try out material in front of diehard fans. And the fans get the first shot at hearing it."

In September 2023 while performing on stage in Bucharest, Romania Di Meola suffered a heart attack. He was admitted to a local hospital where he was treated for ST elevation myocardial infarction. Dates from his "The Electric Years" tour, like his appearance on Brazil's Rio Montreaux Jazz Festival, were immediately cancelled. He took some time off from performances, but began performing again in January 2024.

== Artistry ==
=== Songwriting ===
By the time he was recording Casino, in 1978, Di Meola described his music as a combination of Latin music and "beautiful romantic Italian melodies". His rock 'n' roll side brought in "the energy", and his deep appreciation for jazz contributed to the complexity of his compositions.

While blues was a cornerstone of popular music styles of the 1960s and 1970s psychedelic, British blues and hard rock – Al Di Meola did not feel fond of the genre. He confided that, despite liking rock 'n' roll, his lessons with Bob Aslanian made him an outsider in the burdgeoning rock scene:

[...] although there were little groups here and there, I never really made it in any rock bands at the time. I was sort of rejected by a lot of friends of mine and people in the area because my style was so different. To be accepted, you had to play like Jimi Hendrix or Eric Clapton, and I couldn't – not that I didn't want to. And even though I listened to that music a lot and I really liked it, I found that due to my training, I couldn't play it. When I tried that style, it came out sounding weird – only because I would use all four of my fingers; I played scale-like lines, instead of rock riffs. At that time, it wasn't accepted. Later on, I suppose it became the "in" thing or the new thing.

Di Meola is known for using non-Western modes when composing. One example was "Egyptian Danza" – the opening track from Casino – is based on a Phrygian dominant scale. Right around that time, he said he was also keen on applying "elements" of the dorian, myxolydian, and locrian modes on his playing.

=== Speed picking ===
The impressive speed and accuracy of Di Meola's alternate picking is a hallmark of his style. "There was a time when I really wanted to become the fastest guitarist in the world," said the musician. By the mid-1980s, though, he changed his mind. In his words, "that goal is over". To him, "what’s more important to me now is not only how fast you can play but what you say. For what I wanted to achieve, I had to be fast. But that’s already past."

=== Palm muting ===
Another hallmark of his style is his palm muting. In an interview to Rick Beato, Di Meola explained how he developed and practiced this technique: "[...] when I was younger, and the neighbors downstairs in the next yard, I didn't really want them to hear me play. So I would mute my strings. So I got kind of got used to the palm on the bridge and muting. But I also liked the fact that the notes popped".

Di Meola espouses the advantages of palm muting when playing the electric guitar:

If you're playing, let's say, a Les Paul or a guitar with a lot of amplification in a sustained setting, and you go down low, it's pretty messy. So I would try to clean that up by muting so that you don't have this 'wash' of sound, if you know what I mean. It cleans up the wash, in a sense. So that kind of became a thing.

=== Whammy bar ===
Although fond of whammy bars, they are also notably absent from Di Meola's playing style. Di Meola's 1971 black Les Paul, featured on his early solo records, came with a Bigsby, which he had removed for a variety of reasons. He cited tuning issues, along with loss of tone and "some sustain capabilities." In the 1980s di Meola acquired a PRS solid-body with a tremolo. He later quit using it, confessing he was "afraid of the obvious comparisons to other players."

=== Other techniques ===
Di Meola advocates for the importance of picking all notes as much as possible. He steers clear from sweep picking and hammer-ons, which he deems as "shortcuts". In his opinion they're detrimental, in the long run, "for playing more intricate kinds of music". For one, this makes his playing quite distinct from blues guitarists, whose regular use of hammer-ons and pull-offs are essential to the style. By avoiding sweep picking, he also sets himself apart from the 1980s shred guitar movement, which heavily relied on this technique. Di Meola made all those points quite clear on a 1992 interview to Downbeat magazine:

Different areas that you pick, different ways you hold your hand all change the tonality and color of the sound. Even though half the time I'm unconscious of what I'm doing, I think it's important. I don't really rely on any gadgets to do that kind of thing. Good articulation is what allows people to feel those notes. I always liked that about flamenco music; you can feel the notes. It's not about trying to glide around these notes, slurp around those notes, sweep-pick, hammer-on, and all those gimmicks.

On the subject of note picking, Di Meola is critical of tapping as well, a technique popularized by Eddie Van Halen in the late 1970s and 1980s. He views it as a form of "cheating"; an impressive way to sound fast, without being de facto fast. He then draws attention to its limited use in an acoustic context, due to the lack of sustain a classical guitar has compared to an electric.

Di Meola is proficient in crosspicking, a technique that meshes arpeggios with string skipping. One such example is "Vertigo Shadow" from Cielo e Terra, played at a 7/8 meter.

=== Criticism ===
The criticism of Di Meola's musicianship usually focuses on the perceived lack of expression and substance. Critics perceived him "as a texbook case in what was wrong with fusion guitarists – strutting empty virtuosity and rock & roll poses rather than drinking deep of the jazz spirit." In February 1981, Jazz Journal described Di Meola's solo set, in a trio performance at the Royal Albert Hall with McLaughlin and Paco de Lucía, as a "one long and structureless amalgam of crudely connected passages" and considered Di Meola as "a rare breed of musicians who make virtuosity seem like a severe handicap."

On the rock 'n' roll side of things, his playing has been also been described as "clinical", "cold" or "soulless". Irish guitar hero and former Thin Lizzy member Gary Moore admired Di Meola, but declared the following in a 1983 interview to Music U.K. magazine:

Everything he does is academic, really. It's like a classical player's approach, if you like, cos that's what he originally was. He adapted that to the electric guitar. And whatever it is he does it's his style and it's really great for what it is. But I just find it very dead and a very sterile kind of style. Shame, cos what he does technically... if he just had a bit of depth to it, it could be fantastic.

On this type of critique, Di Meola defended himself, stating:

I just don't like reading any kind of review where a critic might point out only the fact that 'He's a speed demon.' If they can't hear the emotion in the music or the message or the melodic content of the improvisation, it really upsets me. Then I know I'm dealing with someone who doesn't know what they're talking about, or is very envious. A lot of reviewers seem to be frustrated guitar players or musicians, so I have to point out to these critics that the message is just as important, and it's evident. Yet they continue to pick out one element and then harp on it - 'He's just trying to impress people with speed.' Absolutely not! If that were the case, I wouldn't have as much composition on my albums.

And later on:

It's a bunch of bullshit every time guitarists say, "One note says so much more than 100." I always laugh at idiots who make that claim. Tell that to a flamenco player or a classical player and see what they say. It's almost a defensive reaction. They take something they lack, attack it and claim they never wanted it in the first place. Sure!

In a 1994 DownBeat blindfold test, John McLaughlin reportedly praised Di Meola’s technique on "Egyptian Danza" but expressed a preference for more American influences in his music, commenting that "he plays cultural hopscotch."

== Legacy ==
Di Meola influenced many hard rock and heavy metal guitar players, including Mr. Big's Paul Gilbert, Extreme's Nuno Bettencourt and Dream Theater's John Petrucci. The late Ozzy Osbourne guitarist Randy Rhoads once declared Di Meola was his favorite guitarist. Neoclassical players Yngwie Malmsteen, Tony MacAlpine and Jason Becker have also praised him. MacAlpine said in 1987:

He's someone I greatly admire. I knew everything he ever did, every song from Return to Forever to all his solo albums. He was like the big guy to me. I picked up some things from him, like the right hand muting technique with the palm and the sheer speed and cleanless of execution. He was a big inspiration to me. He's mellowed out lately with Cielo e Terra and Soaring Through a Dream, which is cool. But I really like what he was doing before. I really hope he will incorporate that stuff back into what he's doing. I think he'll probably go back to that one day, and it'll be pretty amazing I'm sure.

Toto guitarist and session musician Steve Lukather said Al was "incredible" and that his "sound and style [...] smacked me in the face". Lukather tied Di Meola with John McLaughlin as two of the 12 guitar players that shaped his style.

Di Meola has been inducted for Guitar Player's "Gallery Of The Greats" by winning 5 times in one or more categories of the magazine's Annual Readers Poll. He has been awarded 14 times so far, on four different categories: "New Talent" (1975), "Jazz" (1977–1981), "Guitar LP" (1977, 1978, 1980, 1981) and "Acoustic Steel-String" (1983–1987).

Guitar World magazine included Di Meola on their top 50 fastest "shredders" of all-time list, alongside other rock and jazz players such as Eddie Van Halen, Joe Satriani, Steve Vai, Marty Friedman, Allan Holdsworth, and Frank Gambale, although Di Meola personally dislikes the term, seeing himself as more of a composer than a virtuoso.

Di Meola, along with his Return to Forever bandmates, received the BBC Jazz "Lifetime Achievement Award" in 2008, presented by Beatles producer George Martin. They performed Romantic Warrior's title track at the event. The same year, he received an honorary doctorate degree from his alma mater, the Berklee College of Music.

== Discography ==
Refer to the main article for Di Meola's complete discography.

- Land of the Midnight Sun (1976)
- Elegant Gypsy (1977)
- Casino (1978)
- Splendido Hotel (1980)
- Friday Night in San Francisco (1981; with John McLaughlin and Paco de Lucía)
- Electric Rendezvous (1982)
- Scenario (1983)
- Cielo e Terra (1985)
- Soaring Through a Dream (1985; with the Al DiMeola Project)
- Tirami Su (1987)
- World Sinfonia (1991)
- Kiss My Axe (1991)
- World Sinfonia: Heart of the Immigrants (1993)
- Orange and Blue (1994)
- Di Meola Plays Piazzolla (1996)
- The Infinite Desire (1998)
- Winter Nights (1999)
- World Sinfonia: The Grande Passion (2000)
- Flesh on Flesh (2002)
- Consequence of Chaos (2006)
- Vocal Rendezvous (2006)
- Diabolic Inventions and Seduction For Solo Guitar (2007)
- Pursuit of Radical Rhapsody (2011)
- All Your Life (A Tribute to the Beatles) (2013)
- Elysium (2015)
- Opus (2018)
- Across the Universe (2020)
- Twentyfour (2024)

== Awards and nominations ==
Grammy Awards

- 1976: Best Jazz Performance By A Group – "No Mystery" with Chick Corea & Return to Forever

Guitar Player Magazine

- 1975: New Talent
- 1977: Best Jazz Guitarist
- 1978: Best Jazz Guitarist
- 1979: Best Jazz Guitarist
- 1980: Best Jazz Guitarist
- 1977: Best Guitar LP – Elegant Gypsy
- 1978: Best Guitar LP – Casino
- 1980: Best Guitar LP – Splendido Hotel
- 1981: Best Guitar LP – Friday Night In San Francisco with John McLaughlin and Paco de Lucía
- 1983: Acoustic Steel-String
- 1984: Acoustic Steel-String
- 1985: Acoustic Steel-String
- 1986: Acoustic Steel-String
- 1987: Acoustic Steel-String

Berklee College of Music

- 2008: Honorary Doctorate Degree

BBC Jazz Awards

- 2008: Lifetime Achievement with Chick Corea & Return to Forever

Latin Grammy Awards

- 2011: Best Instrumental Album – "Pursuit of Radical Rhapsody"

== Gear and equipment ==
=== Guitars ===
Al Di Meola favored Gibson guitars on most of his career. He also advertised the L6-S model for Gibson in the late 1970s.

On September 23, 2008, PRS Guitars unveiled their Al DiMeola signature model: the Al Di Meola Prism. It was the first PRS to have such a rich color scheme. The Prism was designed after the original Modern Eagle guitar, a cutting-edge midway between a Gibson Les Paul and a Fender Stratocaster. It features a 25" neck, a tremolo bridge and 1957/2008 humbucker pickups, similar to vintage PAF pickups. The guitarist went on the 2008 Return to Forever reunion tour with it.

=== Pickups ===
Al Di Meola was an early DiMarzio user. He's in an ad for the pickup company on the February 23rd, 1978 edition of DownBeat magazine.

== Bibliography ==
- Di Meola, Al (November 1990). "Crosspicking thoughts". Guitar Player. Vol. 24, no. 11. San Francisco, CA. pp. 82–83. ISSN 0017-5463.
- Ferguson, Jim (February 1986). "Leaving fusion behind: Al Di Meola redefines himself". Guitar Player. Vol. 20, no. 2. Cupertino, CA. pp. 62–63, 70–72, 74, 76, 78, 81. ISSN 0017-5463.
- Ferguson, Jim (June 1986). "Synclavier Artists". Guitar Player. Vol. 20, no. 6. San Francisco, CA. pp. 122, 124, 126–127, 155. ISSN 0017-5463.
- Lalaina, Joe (November 1987). "Stars, guitars and open bars: Les Paul's Birthday Bash". Guitar World. Vol. 8, no. 8. New York, NY. pp. 14–15. ISSN 1045-6295.
- Luttjeboer, Hemme (February 1992). "'Last tango for Astor' by Al di Meola". Guitar Player. Vol. 26, no. 2. San Francisco, CA. pp. 79–81. ISSN 0017-5463.
- Milkowski, Bill (September 1983). "Al Di Meola: a new scenario". Downbeat. Vol. 50, no. 9. Chicago, IL. pp. 14–16, 61. ISSN 0012-5768.
- Milkowski, Bill (January 1986). "Al Di Meola comes clean". Guitar World. Vol. 7, no. 1. New York, NY. pp. 64–69, 71. ISSN 1045-6295.
- Milkowski, Bill (November 1987). "Mr. Monster". Guitar World. Vol. 8, no. 8. New York, NY. pp. 78–79, 81–85. ISSN 1045-6295.
- Mockensturm, Dan (June 1986). "Di Meola's Programmer". Guitar Player. Vol. 20, no. 6. San Francisco, CA. pp. 125, 178. ISSN 0017-5463.
- McLaughlin, John; Di Meola, Al; de Lucía, Paco. (1983). Passion, Grace & Fire. [CD]. Barcelona, Spain: Global Rhythm Press. Paco de Lucía: Obra Completa Remasterizada (2005).
- Nolan, Herb (February 23, 1978). "Al Di Meola: score one for elegance". DownBeat. Vol. 45, no. 4. Chicago, IL. pp. 16–17, 55. ISSN 0012-5768.
- Pohren, Donn E. (1992). Paco de Lucía and Family: the master plan. Madrid, Spain: Society of Spanish Studies. ISBN 9780933224629.
- Point, Michael (August 2008). "Let them hear fusion!". DownBeat. Vol. 75, no. 8. Elmhurt, IL. pp. 28–30, 32–33. ISSN 0012-5768.
- Resnicoff, Matt (February 1997). "Paco de Lucia, Al Di Meola and John McLaughlin: the guitar trio returns". Guitar Player. Vol. 31, no. 2. San Francisco, CA. pp. 29–30. ISSN 0017-5463.
- Sievert, Jon (January 1990). "20 years of reader's choices". Guitar Player. Vol. 24, no. 1. San Francisco, CA. pp. 28–29. ISSN 0017-5463.
- Stewart, Zan (February 1986). "The New Improved Al Di Meola". DownBeat. Vol. 53, no. 2. Elmhurst, IL. pp. 16–19. ISSN 0012-5768.
- Trigger, Vic (February 1978). "Al Di Meola: Guitar Player's poll winner gives away some secrets". Guitar Player. Vol. 12, no. 1. San Francisco, CA. pp. 34–36, 38, 40, 44, 46, 48, 50. ISSN 0017-5463.
- Widders-Ellis, Andy (February 1992). "Al di Meola: an unrepentant virtuoso takes on the world". Guitar Player. Vol. 26, no. 2. San Francisco, CA. pp. 68–72, 74, 76. ISSN 0017-5463.
- Wheeler, Tom (March 1981). "John McLaughlin, Al Di Meola, Paco de Lucia: SUPER TRIO". Guitar Player. Vol. 15, no. 3. Cupertino, CA. pp. 70–76, 78, 80, 82. ISSN 0017-5463.
- Woodard, John (January 1992). "Kiss My Assets: Al Di Meola". DownBeat. Vol. 59, no. 1. Elmhurst, IL. pp. 21–23. ISSN 0012-5768.
