= Chick Corea discography =

American pianist and composer

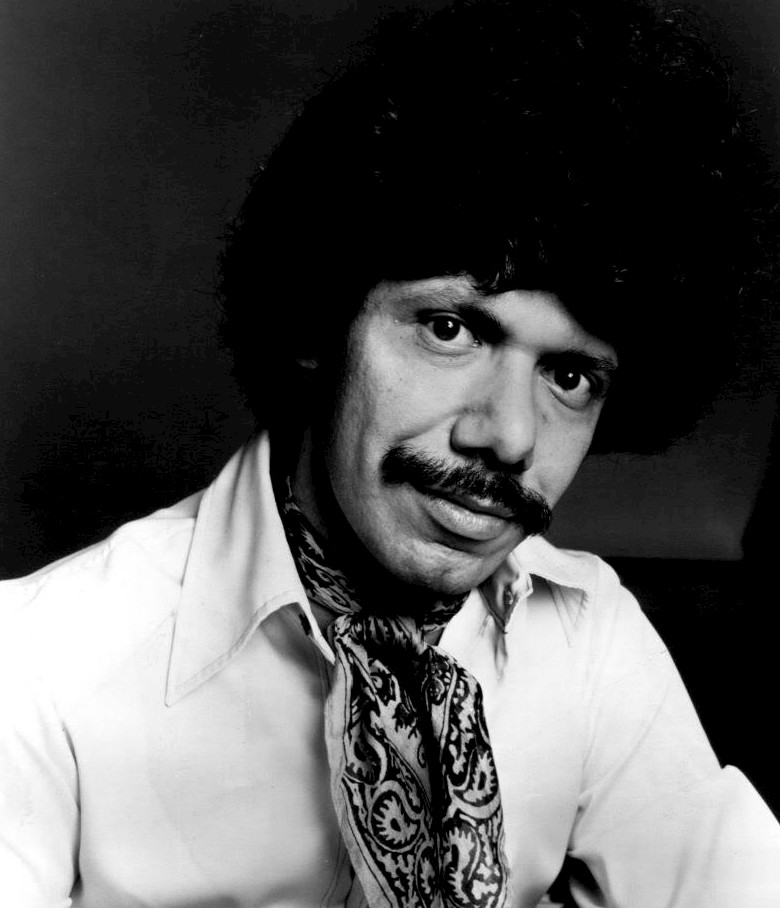
- Corea in 1976
- Studio albums: 76
- Live albums: 37
- Compilation albums: 11

Chick Corea (1941–2021) was an American jazz pianist and composer born on June 12, 1941, in Chelsea, Massachusetts. Corea started learning piano at age four. He recorded his first album, Tones for Joan's Bones, in 1966. Corea performed with Blue Mitchell, Willie Bobo, Cal Tjader and Herbie Mann in the mid-1960s. In the late 1960s he performed with Stan Getz and Miles Davis. The National Endowment for the Arts states, "He ranked with Herbie Hancock and Keith Jarrett as one of the leading piano stylists to emerge after Bill Evans and McCoy Tyner, and he composed such notable jazz standards as 'Spain', 'La Fiesta', and 'Windows'."

== Albums ==
=== Studio albums ===
Year	Title	Label	Date recorded	Notes
1968	Tones for Joan's Bones	Vortex	1966-11-30, 1966-12-01	
1968	Now He Sings, Now He Sobs	Solid State	1968-03-14, -19, -27	
1969	Is	Solid State	1969-05-11 – -13	The Complete "Is" Sessions (Blue Note, 2002)
1972	Sundance	Groove Merchant	1969-05-11, -12, -13	
1971	The Song of Singing	Blue Note	1970-04-07, -08	
1971	The Sun	Express (Japan)	1970-09-14	with Steve Grossman, Dave Holland, Jack DeJohnette, Steve Jackson
1971	A.R.C.	ECM	1971-01-11, -12, -13	with Dave Holland and Barry Altschul
1971	Piano Improvisations Vol. 1	ECM	1971-04-21, -22	
1972	Piano Improvisations Vol. 2	ECM	1971-04-21, -22	
1972	Return to Forever	ECM	1972-02-02, -03	
1973	Light as a Feather	Polydor	1972-10-08, -15	as "Chick Corea and Return to Forever"
1973	Crystal Silence	ECM	1972-11-06	with Gary Burton
1975	Circling In	Blue Note	1968-03-14, -19, -27; 1970-04-07, 1970-08-13, -19	featuring Circle [2LP]
1976	The Leprechaun	Polydor	1975	
1976	My Spanish Heart	Polydor	1976-10	[2LP]
1978	Mad Hatter	Polydor	1977-11	(#81 Canada May 20, 1978)
1978	Secret Agent	Polydor	1978	
1978	Friends	Polydor	1978	
1978	Circulus	Blue Note	1970-04-08, 1970-08-19, -21	featuring Circle [2LP]
1979	Duet	ECM	1978-10-23, -24	with Gary Burton
1979	Delphi I	Polydor	1978-10-26, -27	
1980	Delphi II & III	Polydor	1978-10-26, -27	[2LP]
1980	Chick Corea Featuring Lionel Hampton	Chiaroscuro	1971	
1980	Tap Step	Warner Bros.	1979-12 – 1980-01	
1981	Three Quartets	Stretch	1981-01, 1981-02	
1982	Trio Music	ECM	1981-11	[2CD]
1982	Touchstone	Stretch	1982?	with Paco de Lucia
1983	Again and Again	Elektra/Musician	1982-03-23	
1983	Lyric Suite for Sextet	ECM	1982-09	with Gary Burton
1984	Children's Songs	ECM	1983-07	
1985	Voyage	ECM	1984-07	with Steve Kujala
1985	Septet	ECM	1984-10	
1993	Enter The Spirit	Stretch	1993	With Bob Berg
1994	Expressions	GRP	1994?	
1995	Time Warp	Stretch	1995?	
1996	The Mozart Sessions	Sony Classical	1996-02-05, -06, -07, 1996-05-21	with Bobby McFerrin
1996	Solo Piano: From Nothing	Stretch	1982-07	
1997	Remembering Bud Powell	Stretch	1996	Grammy nominated album
1997	Native Sense - The New Duets	Stretch	1997-06	with Gary Burton
1999	Change	Stretch	1999?	with Origin
2000	Seabreeze	Past Perfect	1978-01	
2001	Past, Present & Futures	Stretch	2001?	
2005	Rhumba Flamenco	Chick Corea Productions	2004	[2CD]
2006	The Ultimate Adventure	Stretch	2005	
2006	Super Trio	Universal (Japan)	2005-04	with Christian McBride, Steve Gadd
2007	Chillin' in Chelan	Universal (Japan)	2005	with Christian McBride, Jeff Ballard
2007	From Miles	Stretch	2006-01	with Eddie Gómez, Jack DeJohnette
2007	The Boston Three Party	Universal (Japan)	2006-04	with Eddie Gomez, Airto Moreira
2007	The Enchantment	Concord	2006-12	with Béla Fleck
2007	Dr. Joe	Stretch	2007?	with Antonio Sanchez, John Patitucci
2012	Hot House	Concord Jazz	2012?	with Gary Burton
2012	The Continents: Concerto for Jazz Quintet & Chamber Orchestra	Deutsche Grammophon	2012?	[2CD]
2013	The Vigil	Concord Jazz	2013?	with Hadrien Feraud, Marcus Gilmore, Tim Garland and Charles Altura
2014	Solo Piano – Portraits	Concord Jazz	2014?	[2CD]
2017	Chinese Butterfly	Stretch/Concord	2017?	with Steve Gadd [2CD]
2018	Tempus Fugit	Stretch	2018?	with Vigilette (Carlitos Del Puerto (bass), Marcus Gilmore (drums))
2019	Antidote	Concord Jazz	2019?	with The Spanish Heart Band
2020	Plays	Concord Jazz	2020?	[2CD]
2024	Remembrance	Thirty Tigers	2024	with Béla Fleck

=== Live albums ===
Year	Title	Label	Date recorded	Notes
1978	An Evening with Herbie Hancock & Chick Corea: In Concert	Columbia	1978-02	Duet with Herbie Hancock [2CD]
1979	CoreaHancock	Polydor	1978-02	Duet with Herbie Hancock
1980	Chick Corea & Lionel Hampton in Concert	RVC	1978-01-22	with Lionel Hampton
1980	In Concert, Zürich, October 28, 1979	ECM	1979-10-28	with Gary Burton
1983	On Two Pianos	Deutsche Grammophon	1982-06-24	Duet with Nicolas Economou at Münchner Klaviersommer
1983	The Meeting	Philips	1982-06-27	Duet with Friedrich Gulda at Münchner Klaviersommer
1986	Trio Music Live in Europe	ECM	1984-09	Trio in Willisau and Reutlingen. Grammy nominated album.
1992	Play	Blue Note	1990-06-23, -27	with Bobby McFerrin
1994	Live in Montreux	GRP	1981-07-15	with Joe Henderson, et al. at Montreux Jazz Festival
1996	The Trio Live from Country Club	Stretch	1982-10?	Trio at Reseda Country Club
1997	Woodstock Jazz Festival 1	Douglas Music	1981-09-19	with Lee Konitz, et al.
1997	Woodstock Jazz Festival 2	Douglas Music	1981-09-19	with Lee Konitz, et al.
1998	Live at the Blue Note	Stretch	1997-12	with Origin at Blue Note
1998	A Week at the Blue Note	Stretch	1998-01	with Origin at Blue Note [6CD]
1999	Corea: Concerto / Spain for Sextet & Orchestra / Piano Concerto, No.1	Sony Classical	1999-04	with Origin and London Philharmonic Orchestra
2000	Solo Piano: Originals	Stretch	1999-11	
2000	Solo Piano: Standards (Part Two)	Stretch	1999-11	
2003	Rendezvous In New York: Live at The Blue Note	Stretch	2001-12	with guests Bobby McFerrin, Joshua Redman, Michael Brecker et al. at The Blue Note [2CD]
2005	Live in Molde	MNJ	2000-07-18	with Trondheim Jazz Orchestra at Moldejazz 2000
2008	The New Crystal Silence	Concord	2007-05, 2007-07	with Gary Burton [2CD]
2008	Duet	Stretch	2007-09	Duet with Hiromi at the Blue Note Tokyo [2CD]
2009	Five Peace Band Live	Concord	2008-10 – 2008-11-23	with John McLaughlin [2CD]
2011	Forever	Concord	2009-09-01, -16, -17, -30, 2009-11-28, 2009-12-12	with Return to Forever members (Stanley Clarke and Lenny White) [2CD]
2011	Further Explorations	Concord Jazz	2010-05-04 – -17	with Eddie Gomez and Paul Motian at The Blue Note [2CD]
2011	Orvieto	ECM	2010-12-30	Duet with Stefano Bollani at the Umbria Jazz Festival
2013	Trilogy	Universal	2010-10 – 2012-12	[3CD] Grammy won album
2015	Two with Béla Fleck	Concord	2007 – 2015?	[2CD]
2016	The Musician	Concord Jazz	2011	[3CD]
2018 (Japan), 2019 (U.S.)	Trilogy 2	Universal (Japan), Concord (U.S.)	2016	[2CD] Grammy won album
2020	Chick Corea Plays	Concord Jazz	2018	[2CD]
2021	Resonance	Universal	2016-05-19, -22, -29	Duet with Makoto Ozone [2CD]
2023	Sardinia: A Night Of Mozart & Gershwin	Candid	2018	live with Orchestra Da Camera Della Sardegna
2025	Trilogy 3	Candid	2020-02 – 2020-03	Trio with Brian Blade and Christian McBride
2025	Forever Yours: The Farewell Performance	Candid	2020-10	

=== Compilations ===
- Inner Space (Atlantic, 1973) – contains all previously published and two unreleased tracks from Tones for Joan's Bones recorded in 1966 & 1968
- Chick Corea/Herbie Hancock/Keith Jarrett/McCoy Tyner (Atlantic, 1976)
- Works (ECM, 1985)
- Chick Corea Compact Jazz (Polydor, 1987)
- Best of Chick Corea (Blue Note, 1993)
- Music Forever & Beyond: The Selected Works of Chick Corea 1964 - 1996 (GRP, 1996) – discs 1-4 are a career-spanning retrospective; disc 5 is all-new recordings of standards, and one original, with the Time Warp quartet
- Selected Recordings (ECM, 2002)
- The Complete "Is" Sessions (Blue Note, 2002) – combined the albums Is and Sundance with alternate takes
- Very Best of Chick Corea (Universal, 2004)
- The Song Is You (Douglas, 2005)[2CD] – combined version of Woodstock Jazz Festival 1 and Woodstock Jazz Festival 2 (Douglas Music, 1997)
- Five Trios (Stretch, 2007)[6CD]
- Electric Chick (Verve, 2008)
- The Montreux Years (Montreux Jazz Festival/BMG, 2022) – rec. 1988, 1993, 2001, 2004, 2006, 2010

=== As group leader ===
==== Circle (with Anthony Braxton, Dave Holland and Barry Altschul) ====
- Circle 1: Live in Germany Concert (CBS/Sony, 1971) – recorded in 1970
- Circle 2: Gathering (CBS/Sony, 1971)
- Paris Concert (ECM, 1972) – recorded in 1971
- Circling In (Blue Note, 1975) – recorded in 1970
- Circulus (Blue Note, 1978) – recorded in 1970

==== Return to Forever ====
===== Studio albums =====
- 1972: Return To Forever (ECM, 1972) – as Chick Corea's album
- 1972: Light as a Feather (Polydor, 1973)
- 1973: Hymn of the Seventh Galaxy (Polydor, 1973)
- 1974: Where Have I Known You Before (Polydor, 1974)
- 1975: No Mystery (Polydor, 1975)
- 1976: Romantic Warrior (Columbia, 1976)
- 1977: Musicmagic (Columbia, 1977)

===== Live albums =====
- 1977: Live (Columbia)[4LP] – live
- 2009: Returns (Eagle)[2CD][DVD-Video] – live
- 2011: Forever (Concord)[2CD] – as Chick Corea, Stanley Clarke and Lenny White's album
- 2012: The Mothership Returns (Eagle)[2CD + DVD-Video] – live

===== Compilations =====
- 1980: The Best of Return to Forever (Columbia)
- 1996: Return to the 7th Galaxy: The Anthology (Verve Records)
- 2008: The Definitive Collection (Verve Records)
- 2008: R.T.F, the Anthology

==== Posthumous release ====
- Live in Japan 1983 (Hi Hat, 2021) – live recorded in 1983
- Alive in America (Renaissance, 2022) – live recorded in 1974
- Joe's Tango, Concerto for Trombone and Other Works (Navona Records, 2023)

==== Chick Corea Elektric Band ====
===== Studio albums =====
Year	Title	Label	Date recorded	Notes
1986	The Chick Corea Elektric Band	GRP	1986-01	
1987	Light Years	GRP	1987?	
1988	Eye of the Beholder	GRP	1988?	
1990	Inside Out	GRP	1990?	
1991	Beneath the Mask	GRP	1991?	
1993	Elektric Band II: Paint the World	GRP	1993?	
2004	To the Stars	Stretch	2004	

===== Live albums =====
Year	Title	Label	Date recorded	Notes
1996	Live from Elario's (First Gig)	Stretch	1985-04-19	
2017	Live in Tokyo 1987	Universal Music	1987-10-08	reissue of disk 2 of GRP Super Live in Concert (GRP, 1988)[2CD]
2023	The Future Is Now	Candid	2016–2017	

==== Chick Corea Akoustic Band ====
===== Studio album(s) =====
Year	Title	Label	Date recorded	Notes
1989	Chick Corea Akoustic Band	GRP	1989?	

===== Live albums =====
Year	Title	Label	Date recorded	Notes
1987	Summer Night: Live	Jazz Door	1987-10-01	Unofficial release
1991	Alive	GRP	1989-12-16	
1996	Live from Blue Note Tokyo	Stretch	1992	Live at Blue Note Tokyo
2019	Live	Stretch	2018-01-13	[2CD] Grammy won track included

=== As sideman ===
==== With Stanley Clarke ====
- Children of Forever (Polydor, 1973)
- Journey to Love (Nemperor, 1975)
- Rocks, Pebbles and Sand (Epic, 1980)
- Up (Mack Avenue, 2014)

==== With Miles Davis ====
- Water Babies (Columbia, 1976) - rec. 1967–1968
- Filles de Kilimanjaro (Columbia, 1968)
- In a Silent Way (Columbia, 1969)
- Bitches Brew (Columbia, 1970)
- Miles Davis at Fillmore: Live at the Fillmore East (Columbia, 1970)
- Jack Johnson (Columbia, 1971) – a.k.a. A Tribute to Jack Johnson
- Live-Evil (Columbia, 1971)
- On the Corner (Columbia, 1972)
- Big Fun (Columbia, 1974) - compilation rec. 1969-1972
- Black Beauty: Live at the Fillmore West (Columbia, 1977) - rec. 1970
- Circle in the Round (Columbia, 1979) - compilation rec. 1955-1970
- 1969 Miles Festiva de Juan Pins (CBS/Sony, 1993) - rec. 1969
- Live in Europe 1969: The Bootleg Series Vol. 2 (Columbia Legacy, 2013) - rec. 1969
- Bitches Brew Live (Sony, 2011) - live rec. 1969-1970
- Miles at the Fillmore - Miles Davis 1970: The Bootleg Series Vol. 3 (Columbia Legacy, 2014)[4CD] - rec. 1970

==== With Joe Farrell ====
- Joe Farrell Quartet (CTI, 1970)
- Outback (CTI, 1971)
- Skate Board Park (Xanadu, 1979)

==== With Stan Getz ====
- Sweet Rain (Verve, 1967)
- What the World Needs Now: Stan Getz Plays Burt Bacharach and Hal David (Verve, 1968)
- Captain Marvel (Verve, 1972)

==== With Joe Henderson ====
- Mirror Mirror (MPS, 1980)
- Relaxin' at Camarillo (Contemporary, 1981) – rec. 1979
- Big Band (Verve, 1996)

==== With Eric Kloss ====
- To Hear Is to See! (Prestige, 1969)
- Consciousness! (Prestige, 1970)

==== With Hubert Laws ====
- The Laws of Jazz (Atlantic, 1964)
- Flute By-Laws (Atlantic, 1966)
- Laws' Cause (Atlantic, 1968)
- Wild Flower (Atlantic, 1972)
- Family (Columbia, 1980)
- Blanchard: New Earth Sonata (Columbia Masterworks, 1985)

==== With Herbie Mann ====
- Herbie Mann Plays the Roar of the Greasepaint – The Smell of the Crowd (Atlantic, 1965)
- Monday Night at the Village Gate (Atlantic, 1966) - recorded in 1965
- Latin Mann (Columbia, 1965)
- Standing Ovation at Newport (Atlantic, 1965)

==== With Al di Meola ====
- Land of the Midnight Sun (Columbia, 1976)
- Splendido Hotel (Columbia, 1980) – rec. 1979
- Consequence of Chaos (Telarc, 2006)

==== With Blue Mitchell ====
- The Thing to Do (Blue Note, 1964)
- Down with It! (Blue Note, 1965)
- Boss Horn (Blue Note, 1966)

==== With John Patitucci ====
- John Patitucci (GRP, 1987)
- On the Corner (GRP, 1989)
- Heart of the Bass (Stretch, 1992)

==== With Wayne Shorter ====
- Super Nova (Blue Note, 1969)
- Moto Grosso Feio (Blue Note, 1974) – rec. 1970

==== With Cal Tjader ====
- Soul Burst (Verve, 1966)
- Along Comes Cal (Verve, 1967)

==== With Allen Vizzutti ====
- In the Pocket (Headfirst, 1981)
- Skyrocket (Summit, 1995)

==== With others ====
- Jon Anderson, 1000 Hands: Chapter One ( Blue Élan Records, 2000)
- Bob Berg, Enter The Spirit (Stretch, 1993)
- Dee Dee Bridgewater, Just Family (Elektra, 1977)
- Gary Burton, Like Minds (Concord, 1998) – Grammy won album. rec. 1997.
- Marion Brown, Afternoon of a Georgia Faun (ECM, 1970)
- Anthony Braxton, The Complete Braxton (Freedom, 1973)
- Donald Byrd, The Creeper (Blue Note, 1981) - rec. 1967
- Ron Carter, Parade (Milestone, 1980) – rec. 1979
- Larry Coryell, Spaces (Vanguard, 1970)
- Richard Davis, The Philosophy of the Spiritual (Cobblestone, 1971) – reissued as With Understanding (Muse, 1975)
- Eliane Elias, Mirror Mirror (Candid, 2021)
- Maynard Ferguson, Primal Scream (Columbia, 1976)
- David Friesen, Amber Skies (Palo Alto, 1983)
- Letizia Gambi, Introducing Letizia Gambi (Jando Music / Via Veneto Jazz, 2012)
- Eddie Gómez, Gomez (Interface, 1984)
- Herbie Hancock, Gershwin's World (Verve, 1998)
- L. Ron Hubbard & Friends, The Road to Freedom (Revenimus Music, 1986)
- Bobby Hutcherson, Total Eclipse (Blue Note. 1969)
- Montego Joe, Arriba! Con Montego Joe (Prestige, 1964)
- Elvin Jones, Merry-Go-Round (Blue Note. 1971)
- Chaka Khan, Echoes of an Era (Elektra, 1982)
- Rolf Kühn, Going to the Rainbow (BASF, 1971)
- Paco de Lucia, Zyryab (Polygram, 1990)
- The Manhattan Transfer, The Chick Corea Songbook (Four Quarters Entertainment, 2009)
- Tete Montoliu, Lunch in L.A. (Contemporary, 1980)
- Airto Moreira, Free (CTI, 1972)
- Philharmonia Virtuosi of New York, Greatest Hits of 1790 (Columbia Masterworks, 1980)
- Armando Peraza, Wild Thing (Skye, 1968)
- Dave Pike, Manhattan Latin (Decca, 1964)
- Jean-Luc Ponty, Open Mind (Atlantic, 1984)
- Pete La Roca, Turkish Women at the Bath (Douglas, 1967) – reissued under Corea's name as Bliss (Muse, 1973)
- Wallace Roney, Village (Warner Bros., 1997) – rec. 1996
- Antonio Sánchez, Migration (CAM Jazz, 2007)
- Mongo Santamaria, Skins (Milestone, 1962)
- Sonny Stitt, Stitt Goes Latin (Roost, 1963)
- John Surman, Conflagration (Dawn, 1971)
- Gábor Szabó, Femme Fatale (Pepita, 1979)
- Miroslav Vitous, Universal Syncopations (ECM, 2003)
- Mark Weinstein, Cuban Roots (Musicor, 1967)
- Sadao Watanabe, Round Trip (CBS/Sony, 1970)
- Béla Fleck, "Remembrance" (Thirty Tigers, 2024)
