= CoreaHancock =

Live album by Chick Corea and Herbie Hancock
- Released: September 28, 1979
- Recorded: February 1978
- Genre: Jazz
- Length: 81:23 (vinyl); 71:41 (CD)
- Label: Polydor
- Producer: David Rubinson

Chick Corea chronology
| Delphi I (1979) | CoreaHancock (1979) | Chick Corea Featuring Lionel Hampton (1980) |

Herbie Hancock chronology
| VSOP: Live Under the Sky (1979) | CoreaHancock (1979) | Monster (1980) |

Professional ratings
Review scores
| Source | Rating |
|---|---|
| Allmusic | 4.5/5 stars |
| The Rolling Stone Jazz Record Guide | 4/5 stars |
| The Penguin Guide to Jazz Recordings | 2/4 stars |

CoreaHancock is an acoustic live album by Chick Corea and Herbie Hancock. It was recorded over the course of several live performances in February 1978 and released in 1979. Corea has top billing on this album, as Hancock did for An Evening with Herbie Hancock & Chick Corea: In Concert, another recording of the same tour released on Hancock's label. The CD version heavily edits what was released on the final side of the vinyl version.

Hancock makes reference to Corea's albums Piano Improvisations Vol. 1 and Vol. 2 in his introduction of Corea on this album.

== Track listing ==
=== Vinyl ===
Side one

1. "Homecoming" (Corea) – 19:10

Side two

1. "Ostinato" _{(from "Mikrokosmos for Two Pianos, Four Hands")} (Béla Bartók) – 2:37
2. "The Hook" (Corea, Hancock) – 13:15

Side three

1. "Herbie's Intro of Chick" – 0:41
2. "Bouquet" (Corea) – 18:13

Side four

1. "Maiden Voyage" (Hancock) – 10:42
2. "La Fiesta" (Corea) – 16:45

=== CD ===
1. "Homecoming" (Corea) – 19:12
2. "Ostinato" _{(from "Mikrokosmos for Two Pianos, Four Hands")} (Béla Bartók) – 3:02
3. "The Hook" (Corea, Hancock) – 13:30
4. "Bouquet" (Corea) – 19:22
5. "Maiden Voyage" (Hancock) – 8:26
6. "La Fiesta" (Corea) – 8:09

== Personnel ==
Musicians

- Chick Corea – piano, right channel
- Herbie Hancock – piano, left channel (except on "Bouquet")

Production

- Phill Brown – mastering
- Fred Catero – remixing, mixing
- Tony Cohan – liner notes
- Jeffrey Cohen – liner notes, associate producer
- Les D. Cooper – remote recording crew
- Biff Dawes – remote recording crew
- Dennis Drake – remixing, digital remastering
- Ellie Hughes – design
- Tom Hughes – design
- Rory Kaplan – engineer
- Bernie Kirsh – engineer, editing
- Michael Manoogian – design
- Darryl Pitt – photography
- Seth Rothstein – liner notes, preparation, CD preparation
- David Rubinson – producer, remixing, mixing
- Ray Thompson – remote recording crew
- Billy Youdelman – remote recording crew
