= The Song of Singing =

Studio album by Chick Corea
- Released: February 2, 1971
- Recorded: April 7–8, 1970
- Studio: A & R, New York City
- Genre: Free jazz, post-bop
- Length: 35:43
- Label: Blue Note; BLP 4353; BST 84353
- Producer: Sonny Lester

Chick Corea chronology
The Sun (1971)	The Song of Singing (1971)	A.R.C. (1971)

Professional ratings
Review scores
Source	Rating
AllMusic	4/5 stars
DownBeat	4.5/5 stars
The Penguin Guide to Jazz Recordings	4/4 stars
The Rolling Stone Jazz Record Guide	4/5 stars

The Song of Singing is a studio album by Chick Corea, recorded over two days in April 1970 and released on Blue Note the following year. The trio, comprising rhythm section Corea, Dave Holland and Barry Altschul, made up three fourths of the free jazz ensemble Circle—missing only Anthony Braxton.

== Track listing ==
=== Original release ===
All tracks are written by Barry Altschul, Chick Corea and Dave Holland except as noted.

Side 1
No.	Title	Writer(s)	Length
1.	"Toy Room"	Dave Holland	5:51
2.	"Ballad I"		4:17
3.	"Rhymes"	Chick Corea	6:50

Side 2
No.	Title	Writer(s)	Length
1.	"Flesh"	Corea	6:06
2.	"Ballad III"		5:34
3.	"Nefertiti"	Wayne Shorter	7:05

CD bonus tracks
No.	Title	Writer(s)	Length
7.	"Blues Connotation"	Ornette Coleman	7:23
8.	"Ballad II" (not included on the 1987 CD reissue)		6:36
9.	"Drone"		22:25

- The 1987 CD reissue added two bonus tracks originally issued in the 1970s on Circling In and Circulus; the 1989 CD reissue added the last unissued track from these recordings sessions.

== Personnel ==
- Chick Corea – piano
- Dave Holland – bass
- Barry Altschul – drums

== See also ==
- Miles Davis, Jack Johnson – recorded on the same day, April 7, 1970, without Corea.
