= Native Sense - The New Duets =

Studio album by Chick Corea and Gary Burton
- Released: October 1997
- Recorded: June 1997
- Genre: Jazz
- Length: 64:11
- Label: Stretch
- Producers: Chick Corea, Ron Moss

Chick Corea chronology
Remembering Bud Powell (1997)	Native Sense - The New Duets (1997)	Live at the Blue Note (1998)

Gary Burton chronology
Departure (1997)	Native Sense - The New Duets (1997)	Ástor Piazzolla Reunion (1998)

Native Sense - The New Duets is an album by vibraphonist Gary Burton and the pianist Chick Corea, released in 1997 on the Concord label. The album is the fourth studio recording by the duo following Crystal Silence (1972), Duet (1978) and Lyric Suite for Sextet (1982). The album peaked number 25 in the Billboard Top Jazz Albums chart.

== Reception ==
The AllMusic review by Richard S. Ginell stated: "This is the product of two mature masters in their mid-fifties from the jazz-rock era who know precisely what they want from their instruments and reject stylistic boundaries".

Professional ratings
Review scores
Source	Rating
AllMusic	4/5 stars
The Penguin Guide to Jazz Recordings	3.5/4 stars

== Track listing ==
All compositions by Chick Corea except where noted.

1. Native Sense" – 6:29
2. "Love Castle" – 7:25
3. "Duende" – 8:03
4. "No Mystery" – 9:05
5. "Armando's Rhumba" – 3:43
6. "Bagatelle #6" (Béla Bartók) – 1:14
7. "Post Script " – 5:44
8. "Bagatelle #2" (Béla Bartók) – 2:46
9. "Tango '92" – 4:58
10. "Rhumbata" – 9:34
11. "Four in One" (Thelonious Monk) – 5:10

== Personnel ==
- Chick Corea – piano
- Gary Burton – vibraphone, marimba

Other credits

- Gildas Boclé – photography
- Evelyn Brechtlein – production coordination
- Jordan d'Alessio – assistant engineer
- Bernie Kirsh – engineer, mixing
- Darren Mora – assistant engineer
- Ron Moss – executive producer
- Robert Read – assistant engineer
- Alan Yoshida – mastering

== Chart performance ==
Year	Chart	Position
1997	Billboard Top Jazz Albums	25
