= Secret Agent (Chick Corea album) =

Studio album by Chick Corea
- Released: 1978
- Recorded: 1978
- Studios: Producers Workshop, Los Angeles (tracks A1 to B1, B3, B4) & Kendun Recorders, Burbank, California, USA (track B2)
- Genre: Jazz
- Length: 42:58
- Label: Polydor
- Producer: Chick Corea

Chick Corea chronology
Circulus (1978)	Secret Agent (1978)	Friends (1978)

Professional ratings
Review scores
Source	Rating
All About Jazz	3.5/5 stars
AllMusic	3/5 stars
The Rolling Stone Jazz Record Guide	2/5 stars
DownBeat	4/5 stars

Secret Agent is a studio album by Chick Corea, recorded and released in 1978. It is a musically diverse release that features Corea’s long-standing collaborators Joe Farrell on woodwinds, percussionist Airto Moreira, and vocalist Gayle Moran (Corea’s wife). Al Jarreau sings “Hot News Blues”, and a four piece brass section and string quartet also appear.

This album is one of three that Corea released in 1978, along with The Mad Hatter and Friends in what was called an "almost impossibly active year". 1978 also featured the release of live albums An Evening with Herbie Hancock & Chick Corea: In Concert and RTF Live: The Complete Concert (4LP Box Set) with Return to Forever.

== Reception ==
DownBeat gave the album 4 stars. Douglas Clark wrote in his review, "Despite its flaws, this album cooks, and good solos abound. Corea and Farrell each have a few; Vizzutti has a nice flugelhorn spot on Funk and Bunny Brunel punches out a good chorus on Park, as does Airto on timbales.Corea is in control, but his band is with him all the way".

== Track listing ==
All pieces are composed by Chick Corea unless otherwise noted.

=== Side one ===
1. "Golden Dawn" – 3:39
2. "Slinky" – 5:42
3. "Mirage" – 2:11
4. "Drifting" – 4:09
5. "Glebe St. Blues" – 6:58

=== Side two ===
1. "Fickle Funk" – 5:05
2. "Bagatelle, No. 4" (Béla Bartók) – 3:34
3. "Hot News Blues" – 6:18
4. "Central Park" – 5:22

== Personnel ==
- Chick Corea – acoustic piano (A1, B2); Fender Rhodes electric piano (A2, A3, A5, B1, B3, B4); Hohner clavinet (A5, B4 ); Minimoog, Multimoog & Oberheim Eight Voice synthesizers (A1 to A4, B2 to B4); backing vocals (B4); percussion
- Allen Vizzutti – trumpet (A1, A2, A4, A5, B4); flugelhorn (B1)
- Bob Zottola – trumpet (A1, A2, A4, A5, B4)
- Ron Moss – trombone (A5, B4); bass trombone (B4)
- Jim Pugh – trombone (A1 to A5, B4); bass trombone (B4)
- Joe Farrell – flute & alto flute (A2, A4); bass flute (A4); tenor saxophone (A5); soprano saxophone (B1)
- Bunny Brunel – fretless bass (A1, A2, A4 to B1, B3, B4)
- Tom Brechtlein – drums (A1, A2, A4, A5, B3, B4)
- Airto Moreira – percussion (A2, A4, B4); hi-hat (B1)
- Charles Veal – violin & viola (A1, A5, B4); backing vocals (B4)
- Carol Shive – violin (A1, A5, B4); backing vocals (B4)
- Paula Hochhalter – cello (A1, A5, B4); backing vocals (B4)
- Gayle Moran – lead vocals (A4, A5, B2); backing vocals (B4)
- Al Jarreau – lead vocals (B3)

== Charts ==
Chart (1979)	Peak position
US Billboard Jazz Albums	7
