= Duet (disambiguation) =

A duet is a musical form for two performers.

Duet may also refer to:

== Art, entertainment, and media ==
=== Films ===
- Duet (1994 film), an Indian Tamil musical film directed by K. Balachander
- Duet (2006 film), a short film written, produced and directed by Kiarash Anvari
- Duet (2014 film), a short film created by Disney animator Glen Keane

=== Games ===
- Duet (video game), a 2013 action game by Kumobius

=== Music ===
==== Compositions ====
- Duet, Steve Reich
- Duet in B, Christoph Schaffrath
- Organ Duet, Samuel Wesley
- "Duet", by Wes Mack from Edge of the Storm, 2015
- "Duet" (Neal Hefti composition), 1957 jazz composition and arrangement by Neal Hefti
- "Duet" (Everything Everything song), 2013
- "Duett" (Rolf Løvland song), English version of Norwegian song Duett performed by Bettan & Jan Werner in 1994
- "Duet", by Black Eyed Peas from Behind the Front, 1998

==== Albums ====
- Duet!, a 1972 album by Earl Hines and Jaki Byard
- Duet (Stan Kenton and June Christy album), 1955
- Duet (Doris Day and André Previn album), 1962
- Duet (Lester Bowie and Phillip Wilson album), 1978
- Duet (Gary Burton & Chick Corea album), 1979
- Duet (Muhal Richard Abrams album), 1981
- Duet (Lester Bowie and Nobuyoshi Ino album), 1985
- Duet (Chick & Hiromi album), an album by Chick Corea
- Duet (Ronan Keating album), 2010
- Duet (Jeff Coffin and Jeff Sipe album), 2011
- Duet (Archie Shepp and Dollar Brand album)

==== Music business ====
- Duet, the original name for online music service PressPlay

=== Television ===
- "Duet" (Star Trek: Deep Space Nine), a 1993 episode of Star Trek: Deep Space Nine
- "Duet" (Stargate Atlantis), an episode of the science fiction television series Stargate Atlantis
- "Duet", an episode of the TV series Make It Pop
- Duet (TV series), a Fox sitcom
- "Duet" (The Flash), a musical crossover episode of The Flash with Supergirl

== Education ==
- DUET, Dawood University of Engineering and Technology, Karachi, Pakistan
- DUET, Dhaka University of Engineering & Technology, Gazipur, Bangladesh

== See also ==
- Duets (disambiguation)
- Duo (disambiguation)
