= Tap Step =

Studio album by Chick Corea
- Released: 1980
- Recorded: December 1979 – January 1980
- Studios: Ocean Way Recording Studio (track A1) & Love Castle Studios (tracks A2–B4), Los Angeles, California, USA
- Genre: Jazz
- Length: 40:38
- Label: Warner Bros.
- Producer: Chick Corea

Chick Corea chronology
Delphi II & III (1980)	Tap Step (1980)	Chick Corea & Lionel Hampton in Concert (1980)

Professional ratings
Review scores
Source	Rating
AllMusic	2.5/5 stars
The Penguin Guide to Jazz	3/4 stars
The Rolling Stone Jazz Record Guide	3/5 stars
DownBeat	3/5 stars

Tap Step is a studio album recorded by Chick Corea in 1979 & 1980. It features previous Corea collaborators Flora Purim, Joe Farrell, Stanley Clarke and Gayle Moran, along with percussionists Airto, Don Alias and Laudir de Oliveira.

== Recording ==
The album was recorded in December 1979 and January 1980. All of the seven tracks were originals first released on this album.

== Reception ==
In a review issued on May 3, 1980, a Billboard writer commented on Corea's experimentation on Tap Step with three types of Moog synthesizer, an Oberheim synthesizer, a Rhodes and Bösendorfer and a Hohner duo keyboard. In the view of the writer, this approach made this album sound modern but also at times "freakish and unmusical".

== Track listing ==
All music composed and arranged by Chick Corea.

=== Side one ===
1. "Samba L.A." (lyrics by Tony Cohan) – 5:52
2. "The Embrace" (lyrics by Tony Cohan) – 5:52
3. "Tap Step" – 8:19

=== Side two ===
1. "Magic Carpet" – 6:51
2. "The Slide" – 6:47
3. "Grandpa Blues" (vocoder lyrics by Chick Corea) – 4:03
4. "Flamenco" – 3:34

== Personnel ==
- Chick Corea – acoustic piano (A2, B1, B4); Fender Rhodes electric piano (A3, B2, B3); Hohner clavinet (A1); Minimoog (A3, B2–B4), Moog vocoder (B3), Moog 55 modular (A1–B4) & Oberheim OB-X (A1, A3) synthesizers; wood blocks (B1); handclaps
- Gayle Moran – vocals (A1, A2)
- Flora Purim – vocals (A1)
- Shelby Flint – vocals (A1)
- Nani Villa Brunel – vocals (A1)
- Al Vizzutti – trumpets (A2, A3, B1); flugelhorn (A2)
- Hubert Laws – flute (A2); piccolo flute (B4)
- Joe Farrell – tenor saxophone (A3, B1); soprano saxophone (B4)
- Joe Henderson – tenor saxophone (B4)
- Bunny Brunel – fretless electric bass (A2–B4); Yamaha 2000 keyboard (A2)
- Jamie Faunt – electric piccolo bass (B2)
- Stanley Clarke – electric piccolo bass, talk box (B3)
- Tom Brechtlein – drums (A2–B4)
- Airto Moreira – drums, snare drums, whistle, tamborim, pandero (A1); cuica (B2)
- Don Alias – congas (A2, B1); Lya drums (B2)
- Laudir de Oliveira – surdo kick drum, ganza shaker, tamborim (A1); agogô (A1, B2)

== Charts ==
Chart (1980)	Peak position
US Top LPs & Tape (Billboard)	170
US Billboard Jazz LPs	8
