= Mountaintop =

Mountaintop or mountain top generally refers to the summit of a mountain.

Mountaintop may also refer to:

- Mountain Top, Pennsylvania

== Martin Luther King Jr ==
- "I've Been to the Mountaintop", the last speech delivered by Martin Luther King, Jr.
- The Mountaintop, a 2009 play by Katori Hall about King

== Music ==
- Mountaintops (album), a 2011 album by Mates of State
- "Mountaintop", song by Relient K on the album Air for Free
- "Mountain Top", tune by Chick Corea from Delphi II & III

== See also ==
- The Mountain (disambiguation)
- Mountaintop removal mining
