= The Vigil (album) =

Studio album by Chick Corea
- Released: August 6, 2013
- Recorded: 2013
- Studio: Mad Hatter Studios, Los Angeles
- Genre: Jazz, Jazz fusion
- Length: 77:26
- Label: Concord
- Producer: Chick Corea

Chick Corea chronology
Hot House (2012)	The Vigil (2013)	Trilogy (2013)

The Vigil is an album recorded by Chick Corea and released sixth of August 2013. In the Billboard Jazz albums charts the album peaked at number 4. The album won the Latin Grammy Award for Best Latin Jazz Album at the 15th Annual Latin Grammy Awards.

== Track listing ==
All tracks are written by Chick Corea.

No.	Title	Length
1.	"Galaxy 32 Star 4"	8:20
2.	"Planet Chia"	11:07
3.	"Portals to Forever"	16:04
4.	"Royalty"	9:19
5.	"Outside of Space"	5:00
6.	"Pledge for Peace"	17:36
7.	"Legacy"	10:00

== Reception ==
Professional ratings
Review scores
Source	Rating
All About Jazz	4/5 stars
AllMusic	4/5 stars
The Guardian	4/5 stars
JazzTimes	(not rated)
Sputnikmusic	4.4/5

John Kelman of All About Jazz comments, "The Vigil is certainly Corea's best electric album in decades,..., he's not made a single recording of new material anything like The Vigil in decades".

Thom Jurek from AllMusic wrote, "These seven tunes (five are over ten minutes) reflect some of Corea's richest writing and arranging in years." He praises the band as exciting "as much for its potential as for the multifaceted talent the group members put on display here".

John Fordham of The Guardian wrote, "Pianist Chick Corea, now 71, sounds on scintillating form here (...). The title apparently represents the vigil of jazz's elder statespersons in cherishing their pasts – but this unexpectedly full-on set is all about celebrating and reinventing, not polishing silverware."

Steve Greenlee from JazzTimes stated, "This is, in fact, the most exciting music Corea has released in many years, and it features the most virile new writing that Corea has offered in a quarter-century (or more)."

Hernan Campbell from Sputnikmusic summarized his review, "He's like a mad scientist at work in this album, combining the elements that made his previous albums so enthralling (...) and breathes life to a new embodiment of masterful ingenuity." The album won the Latin Grammy Award for Best Latin Jazz Album at the 15th Annual Latin Grammy Awards.

== Personnel ==
- Chick Corea – Yamaha CFIIIS concert grand piano, synthesizers (Yamaha Motif XF8 & Minimoog Voyager)
- Tim Garland – bass clarinet, flute, soprano saxophone, tenor saxophone
- Charles Altura – acoustic guitar, electric guitar
- Hadrien Feraud – bass
- Marcus Gilmore – drums

Additional musicians

- Stanley Clarke – bass (track 6)
- Pernell Saturnino – percussion (tracks 1–3)
- Ravi Coltrane – saxophone (track 6)
- Gayle Moran Corea – vocals (track 5)

=== Production ===
- Chick Corea – producer
- Bernie Kirsh – engineer, mixing
- Buck Snow – mixing
- Bob Cetti – assistant engineer
- Bernie Grundman – mastering at Bernie Grundman Mastering (Hollywood, California)
- C. Taylor Crothers – photography
- Marc Bessant – graphic design
- Robert Schoeller – cover art
- Dan Muse – liner note coordination
- Bill Rooney – management

== Chart performance ==
Year	Chart	Position
2013	Billboard Jazz Albums	4
