= Duets =

A duet is a musical composition or piece for two performers.

Duets or The Duets may also refer to:

== Films and television ==
- Duets (film), a 2000 film, starring Gwyneth Paltrow, Paul Giamatti and Huey Lewis
- "Duets" (Glee), a 2010 episode in the second season of Glee
- Duets (TV series), a music-based reality competition show on ABC

== Music ==
- Duets (Bach), works for organ by Johann Sebastian Bach
- "Duetz," the 2017 Gorillaz track, from Humanz Super Deluxe.

=== Albums ===
- Duets (Ane Brun album), 2005
- Duets (Barbra Streisand album), 2002
- Duets (Carla Bley & Steve Swallow album), 1988
- Duets (Dizzy Gillespie album), 1957
- Duets (Elton John album), 1993
- Duets (Emmylou Harris album)
- Duets (Frank Sinatra album), 1993
- Duets II (Frank Sinatra album), a 1994 album by Frank Sinatra
- Duets (Helen Merrill and Ron Carter album), a 1989 album by Helen Merrill and Ron Carter
- Duets (Jimmy Raney and Doug Raney album), 1979
- Duets (Linda Ronstadt album), 2014
- Duets II (Tony Bennett album), 2011
- Duets (Joe Pass and John Pisano album), 1991
- Duets (Kenny Rogers album), 1984
- Duets (Maaya Sakamoto album), 2021
- Duets (Roscoe Mitchell and Anthony Braxton album), 1976
- Reba: Duets, a 2007 album by Reba McEntire
- Duets: The Final Chapter, a 2005 album by The Notorious B.I.G.
- Duets: An American Classic, a 2006 album by Tony Bennett
- Duets, a 2017 album by The Wiggles
- Duets (30th Anniversary), a 2024 compilation album by Andrea Bocelli
- Duets 1976, Anthony Braxton and Muhal Richard Abrams
- Duets: Hamburg 1991, Anthony Braxton and Peter Niklas Wilson
- Duets (1993), Anthony Braxton and Mario Pavane
- Duets: Re-working the Catalogue, a 2015 album by Van Morrison and others
- The Duets (Jo Stafford and Frankie Laine album), 1994
- The Duets (Mulgrew Miller album), 1999

== See also ==
- Duetos (disambiguation)
- Duet (disambiguation)
