= Again and Again (Chick Corea album) =

Studio album by Chick Corea
- Released: 1983
- Recorded: March 23, 1982
- Studio: SABC (Johannesburg)
- Genre: Jazz, Latin, Fusion
- Length: 45:01
- Label: Elektra/Musician
- Producer: Chick Corea

Chick Corea chronology
| Touchstone (1982) | Again and Again (1983) | Lyric Suite for Sextet (1983) |

Professional ratings
Review scores
| Source | Rating |
|---|---|
| Allmusic | 2.5/5 stars |
| The Rolling Stone Jazz Record Guide | 2/5 stars |

Again and Again is an album recorded by Chick Corea in 1982 in the middle of a South African tour and released in 1983.

== Track listing ==
All tracks by Chick Corea

1. "Quintet #3" – 9:24
2. "Waltze" – 7:56
3. "Again and Again" – 4:19
4. "1-2-1234" – 4:06
5. "Diddle Diddle" – 8:15
6. "Twang" – 11:01

== Personnel ==
Musicians

- Chick Corea – Fender Rhodes, Minimoog, Hohner Duo, Oberheim OB-Xa, Yamaha GS-1, Prime Time Digital Delay electronics, cowbell (6), Chinese cymbal (6)
- Steve Kujala – flutes, sopranino saxophone, tenor saxophone
- Carles Benavent – electric bass
- Tom Brechtlein – drums
- Don Alias – percussion

Production

- Chick Corea – producer, liner notes
- Kristen Kasell Nikosey – design
- Norm Ung – design
- Milton Avery – front cover painting
- Norman Seeff – back cover photography

== Chart performance ==
| Year | Chart | Position |
|---|---|---|
| 1983 | Billboard Jazz Albums | 15 |
