= Delphi I =

Studio album by Chick Corea
- Released: 1979
- Recorded: October 26 & 27, 1978
- Studio: The Delphian Foundation, Sheridan, Oregon
- Genre: Jazz
- Length: 44:12
- Label: Polydor
- Producer: Chick Corea

Chick Corea chronology
Duet (Gary Burton & Chick Corea album) (1978)	Delphi I (1979)	CoreaHancock (1979)

Professional ratings
Review scores
Source	Rating
Allmusic	1.5/5 stars
DownBeat	5/5 stars

Delphi I, Solo Piano Improvisations is a studio album recorded by Chick Corea and released in 1979. It is his third solo piano album.

== Reception ==
DownBeat assigned the album 5 stars. Reviewer Jon Balleras wrote, "The “Delphi” titles here are eight vignettes reflecting Coreas feelings towards Delphi and depicting life at that school . . . Accompanying these pastels are seven pieces inspired by Art Tatum . . . there’s a lot to savor here, not just Corea's stylistic continuity and inventive powers, but his caring musicianship".

== Track listing ==
All music composed by Chick Corea.

=== Side one ===
1. "Delphi I" – 3:16
2. "Delphi II" – 0:42
3. "Delphi III" – 1:09
4. "Delphi IV" – 2:43
5. "Delphi V" – 0:54
6. "Delphi VI" – 1:41
7. "Delphi VII" – 2:05
8. "Delphi VIII" – 1:20
9. "Children's Song #20" – 4:53
10. "Stride Time I" – 1:59

=== Side two ===
1. "Stride Time II (Soft Stride)" – 5:35
2. "Stride Time III (Soft Stride)" – 2:52
3. Stride Time IV (Stride Bop)" – 3:55
4. Stride Time V (Mr. T)" – 1:05
5. Stride Time VI (Stride Out)" – 1:18
6. Stride Time VII (Rhapsody for Mr. T)" – 8:45

== Personnel ==
- Chick Corea – piano

== Chart performance ==
Year	Chart	Position
1979	Billboard Jazz Albums	24

== See also ==
- Delphi II & III (Polydor, 1980)
