= Trilogy (Chick Corea album) =

Live album by Chick Corea
- Released: September 10, 2013
- Recorded: October 2010 – December 2012
- Venues: Spain, Switzerland, Austria, Slovenia, Turkey and Japan
- Genre: Jazz
- Length: 204:42
- Label: Concord

Chick Corea chronology
The Vigil (2013)	Trilogy (2013)	Solo Piano – Portraits (2014)

Trilogy is a 2013 live album by Chick Corea and his trio, featuring Corea on piano with Christian McBride on double bass and Brian Blade on drums. The three-disc album was recorded live in Washington, D.C., and Oakland, California, and in Spain, Switzerland, Austria, Slovenia, Turkey, and Japan. The album peaked at number nine on the Billboard Jazz Albums chart in 2014. It won the 2014 Grammy Award for Best Jazz Instrumental Album.

A follow-up of this album, entitled Trilogy 2 and featuring recordings from the same tour, was issued in 2018. Recordings from the trio's brief tour in 2020, Chick Corea's final tour before his death in 2021, were published in 2025 as Trilogy 3.

== Critical reception ==
Professional ratings
Review scores
Source	Rating
All About Jazz	4.5/5 stars
AllMusic	3.5/5 stars
The Guardian	4/5 stars

John Kelman of All About Jazz summarizes his review with the statement: "It's hard to believe that Corea is now 73 years old but, if anything, he's never been more active—and, with albums as superb as Trilogy, in the company of the equally outstanding McBride and Blade, clearly at the top of his game."

Steve Leggett wrote in his AllMusic review: "This expansive live release finds Corea working with bassist Christian McBride and drummer Brian Blade, and the three have an uncanny connection, filling space with gorgeous and subtle phrasings, gliding through all manner of styles with a seemingly effortless elegance, grace, and freshness." and concludes "Not exactly a holding pattern, and not exactly a career summation, Trilogy will surely please and delight Corea's many fans."

John Fordham of the Guardian wrote: "Chick Corea, now 73, has shown that his curiosity as well as his playing remain undimmed with genre-bending recent ventures such as his Vigil group. But plenty of Corea fans want nothing more than for him to cut loose with a classic acoustic-jazz trio, and that’s precisely the deal for this three-CD set, recorded live around the world between 2010 and 2012.(..) For Corea admirers, and jazz-piano fans of all kinds, it’s a must."

== Track listing ==
Disc one

1. "You're My Everything" (Mort Dixon, Harry Warren, Joseph Young) – 12:00
2. "Recorda Me" (Joe Henderson) – 7:29
3. "The Song Is You" (Oscar Hammerstein II, Jerome Kern) – 13:55
4. "Work" (Thelonious Monk) – 5:14
5. "My Foolish Heart" (Ned Washington, Victor Young) – 9:20
6. "Fingerprints" (Chick Corea) – 10:22
7. "Spain" (Corea) – 18:29

Disc two

1. "This Is New" (Ira Gershwin, Kurt Weill) – 12:42
2. "Alice in Wonderland" (Sammy Fain, Bob Hilliard) – 9:04
3. "It Could Happen to You" (Johnny Burke, Jimmy Van Heusen) – 12:00
4. "Blue Monk" (Monk) – 10:01
5. "Armando's Rhumba" (Corea) – 9:13
6. "Op. 11, No. 9" (Alexander Scriabin) – 10:43
7. "How Deep Is the Ocean?" (Irving Berlin) – 13:48

Disc three

1. "Homage" (Corea) – 10:02
2. "Piano Sonata: The Moon" (Corea) – 29:58
3. "Someday My Prince Will Come" (Frank Churchill, Larry Morey) – 10:22

== Personnel ==
- Chick Corea – piano
- Christian McBride – double bass
- Brian Blade – drums

Guest musicians

- Jorge Pardo – flute on "My Foolish Heart" and "Spain"
- Niño Josele – guitar on "My Foolish Heart" and "Spain"
- Gayle Moran Corea – vocals on "Someday My Prince Will Come"

== Charts ==
Chart (2014)	Peak position
US Billboard Top Jazz Albums	9
