= Antidote (Chick Corea album) =

Studio album by Chick Corea and The Spanish Heart Band
- Released: June 28, 2019
- Genre: Latin jazz
- Length: 74:19
- Label: Concord Jazz
- Producers: Chick Corea, Bernie Kirsh and Gayle Moran

Chick Corea chronology
Trilogy 2 (2018)	Antidote (2019)	Live (2019)

Antidote is a studio album by Chick Corea and The Spanish Heart Band. The album received a Grammy Award for Best Latin Jazz Album at the 62nd Annual Grammy Awards.

The album contains re-arranged versions of songs from Corea's My Spanish Heart and Touchstone albums along with two newly written pieces ("Antidote", "Admiration") and three pieces from other composers, including Paco de Lucia's "Zyryab". The recording sessions have been filmed by a crew for a film, produced by the Church of Scientology.

== Track listing ==
1. "Antidote" - 9:14
2. "Duende" - 10:13
3. "The Yellow Nimbus" - Part 1 - 5:47
4. "The Yellow Nimbus" - Part 2 - 5:57
5. "Prelude To My Spanish Heart" - 1:11
6. "My Spanish Heart" - 6:57
7. "Armando’s Rhumba" - 8:02
8. "Desafinado" - 5:03
9. "Zyryab" - 11:55
10. "Pas de Deux" - 1:40
11. "Admiration" - 8:27

== Personnel ==
- Chick Corea – piano, keyboards, synthesizers
- Ruben Blades – vocals
- Gayle Moran – vocals
- Maria Bianca – vocals
- Niño Josele – guitar
- Carlitos Del Puerto – bass guitar
- Jorge Pardo – flute, saxophone
- Michael Rodriguez – trumpet
- Steve Davis – trombone
- Marcus Gilmore – drums
- Luisito Quintero – percussion
- Nino De Los Reyes – tap dance

Production

- Chick Corea – producer
- Gayle Moran – co-producer
- Bernie Kirsh – co-producer
- John Burk – executive producer
- Bernie Grundman – mastering
