= Piano Improvisations Vol. 2 =

Studio album by Chick Corea
- Released: March 1972
- Recorded: April 21–22, 1971
- Studio: Ame Bendiksen Studio; Oslo, Norway
- Genre: Jazz
- Length: 39:14
- Label: ECM 1020 ST
- Producer: Manfred Eicher

Chick Corea chronology
Sundance (1972)	Piano Improvisations Vol. 2 (1972)	Return to Forever (1972)

Professional ratings
Review scores
Source	Rating
AllMusic	2.5/5 stars
The Rolling Stone Jazz Record Guide	5/5 stars
The Penguin Guide to Jazz Recordings	3.5/4 stars

Piano Improvisations Vol. 2 is a studio album (and second solo piano album) by jazz pianist Chick Corea, recorded over two days in April 1971 and released on ECM in March 1972. It was recorded at the same session as Piano Improvisations Vol. 1, released the previous year.

== Background ==
The two Piano Improvisations albums serve as a sort of bridge between Corea's largely free work in Circle and his more melodic Return to Forever music.

== Track listing ==
=== Original release ===
All tracks composed by Chick Corea except as noted
A. Side one

1. "After Noon Song" – 2:49
2. "Song for Lee Lee" – 2:41
3. "Song for Thad" – 2:00
4. "Trinkle, Tinkle" (Thelonious Monk) – 2:01
5. "Masqualero" (Wayne Shorter) – 5:32

B. Side two

1. "Preparation 1" – 2:37
2. "Preparation 2" – 0:52
3. "Departure from Planet Earth" – 7:36
4. "A New Place"
  1. "Arrival" – 0:36
  2. "Scenery" – 5:49
  3. "Imps Walk" – 1:36
  4. "Rest" – 5:05

== Personnel ==
- Chick Corea – piano

Production

- Manfred Eicher – producer
- Jan Erik Kongshaug – engineer
- B. & B. Wojirsch – cover design

== Liner notes ==
On the back cover of the album Corea writes: "This music was created out of the desire to communicate and share the dream of a better life with people everywhere," a theme continued from A.R.C. (Affinity, Reality, Communication), also released the year previously—an expression his deepening interest in Scientology.

== Chart performance ==
Year	Chart	Position
1975	Billboard Jazz Albums	33
