= Chinese Butterfly =

2017 album by Chick Corea and Steve Gadd

Studio album by Chick Corea and Steve Gadd
- Released: November 22, 2017
- Genre: Jazz
- Length: 1:35:00
- Label: Stretch Records
- Producer: Chick Corea; Bill Rooney; Steve Gadd

Chick Corea chronology
Live in Tokyo 1987 (2017)	Chinese Butterfly (2017)	Trilogy 2 (2018)

Steve Gadd chronology
Way Back Home (2016)	Chinese Butterfly (2017)	Steve Gadd Band (2018)

Chinese Butterfly is a double album by keyboardist Chick Corea and drummer Steve Gadd. The band is rounded out by saxophonist/flautist Steve Wilson, guitarist Lionel Loueke and bassist Carlitos del Puerto. The album includes five new compositions and features Earth, Wind & Fire singer Philip Bailey on a new recording of "Return to Forever" from 1972.

== Reception ==
Professional ratings
Review scores
Source	Rating
AllMusic	4.5/5 stars

In a review for AllMusic, Matt Collar wrote: "With both Corea and Gadd in their seventies at the time of recording, it's refreshing to hear them sound so inventive and willing to explore new songs, even as they look back on their over 50-year partnership. Ultimately, it's that vibrant, in-the-moment reciprocity that makes Chinese Butterfly such a compelling listen."

CJ Shearn of Jazz Views stated: "Chinese Butterfly updates a sound from the late 70's and early 80's for a new generation. The music doesn't rest on its laurels, instead seeking to expand... The album contains some of the strongest playing and compositions of the keyboardist in a long time and an incredibly sympathetic group that uses their strengths to imbue so much color."

Writing for Something Else!, S. Victor Aaron commented: "Chinese Butterfly breaks no new ground but in this case, that can be completely forgiven. The Chick Corea + Steve Gadd Band cover old ground with such vigor, inspiration and mastery that makes this album just as essential in 2018 as it would have been in 1978."

In an article for Jazz Times, Mac Randall remarked: "Chinese Butterfly is pretty much what you'd expect from two masters of their respective instruments: a lengthy clinic in exploratory improvisation, tight rhythmic interplay and attention-getting virtuosity."

Jazz Monthly's Scott Yanow wrote: "The sound of the band is often very much like some of Corea's freelance projects of the mid-to-late 1970s... Gadd is in a supportive role, clearly enjoying interacting with the other musicians... Always distinctive on electric piano and synthesizer... Corea is in particularly exuberant form."

Pablo Gorondi of the Daily Herald called the recording "an album full of creativity and chops," and stated: "Even after Corea and Gadd move on to other projects, Chinese Butterfly will remain as an impressive memento of their present collaboration."

WBGO's Gary Walker commented: "Any Chick Corea exploration is a fine thing. To travel with a cat with such a fine tuned rhythmic sense makes it that more enjoyable."

Chris Cooke, writing for KIOS-FM, remarked: "The long anticipated musical summit is worth listening to."

== Track listing ==
CD one
No.	Title	Writer(s)	Length
1.	"Chick's Chums"	John McLaughlin	9:23
2.	"Serenity"	Chick Corea	6:39
3.	"Like I Was Sayin'"	Corea	6:44
4.	"A Spanish Song"	Corea	8:51
5.	"Chinese Butterfly"	Corea	11:50

CD two
No.	Title	Writer(s)	Length
1.	"Return to Forever"	Corea	17:29
2.	"Wake-Up Call"	Corea, Lionel Loueke	18:13
3.	"Gadd-Zooks"	Corea	16:17

== Personnel ==
Musicians

- Chick Corea – keyboards, Yamaha CFX grand piano
- Steve Gadd – drums
- Lionel Loueke – guitars, vocals
- Carlitos del Puerto – acoustic bass, electric bass
- Steve Wilson – flute, saxophone
- Luisito Quintero – percussion
- Philip Bailey – vocals (track 6)

Production

- Chick Corea – executive producer, producer
- Bill Rooney – executive producer, management
- Steve Gadd – co-producer
- Bernie Kirsh – recording, mixing
- Bob Cetti – recording assistant
- Bernie Grundman – mastering at Bernie Grundman Mastering (Hollywood, California)
- C. Taylor Carothers – photography
- Marc Bessant – graphic design
- Dan Muse – package management
