= The Complete "Is" Sessions =

Compilation album by Chick Corea
- Released: October 8, 2002
- Recorded: May 11–13, 1969
- Studio: Bell Sound, New York City
- Genre: Jazz
- Label: Blue Note
- Producer: Sonny Lester, Michael Cuscuna

Chick Corea chronology
Selected Recordings (2002)	The Complete "Is" Sessions (2002)	Rendezvous in New York (2003)

Professional ratings
Review scores
Source	Rating
AllMusic	4/5 stars
The Penguin Guide to Jazz Recordings	4/4 stars

The Complete "Is" Sessions is a 2002 Blue Note Records compilation album by Chick Corea of material recorded in May 1969. The material from the "Is" sessions was released originally on two separate albums on two different record labels. The songs "Is", "This", "Jamala" and "It" were issued as Is on Solid State Records in 1969, whilst the remaining songs were released as Sundance on the Groove Merchant label in 1972. The 2002 Blue Note double CD package also includes alternate takes from the original recording sessions.

== Track listing ==
All tracks composed by Chick Corea unless otherwise noted.

=== Disc one ===
1. "It" – 0:30
2. "The Brain" – 10:10
3. "This" – 8:18
4. "Song of the Wind" – 8:05
5. "Sundance" – 10:02
6. "The Brain [alternate take]" – 7:26
7. "This [alternate take]" – 11:49
8. "Song of the Wind [alternate take]" – 6:46
9. "Sundance [alternate take]" – 12:28

=== Disc two ===
1. "Jamala" (Dave Holland) – 14:07
2. "Converge" – 7:59
3. "Is" – 28:54
4. "Jamala [alternate take]" (Holland) – 8:57
5. "Converge [alternate take]" – 7:59

== Personnel ==
Musicians

- Chick Corea – piano, electric piano
- Woody Shaw – trumpet
- Hubert Laws – flute, piccolo flute
- Bennie Maupin – tenor sax
- Dave Holland – bass
- Jack DeJohnette – drums
- Horace Arnold – drums, percussion

Production

- Sonny Lester – producer
- Michael Cuscuna – release producer, liner notes
- Malcolm Addey – engineer, mastering
- Patrick Roques – artwork
- Francis Wolff – artwork, photography
