= In Concert, Zürich, October 28, 1979 =

Live album by Chick Corea & Gary Burton
- Released: October 1980
- Recorded: October 28, 1979
- Venue: Limmathaus; Zürich, Switzerland
- Genre: Jazz
- Length: 79:59 (2LP); 61:16 (CD)
- Label: ECM 1182/83
- Producer: Manfred Eicher

Gary Burton & Chick Corea chronology
Duet (1979)	In Concert, Zürich, October 28, 1979 (1980)	The New Crystal Silence (2008)

Chick Corea chronology
Chick Corea & Lionel Hampton in Concert (1980)	In Concert, Zürich, October 28, 1979 (1980)	Three Quartets (1981)

Gary Burton chronology
Duet (1979)	In Concert, Zürich, October 28, 1979 (1980)	Easy as Pie (1981)

Professional ratings
Review scores
Source	Rating
AllMusic	4/5 stars
The Penguin Guide to Jazz Recordings	2.5/4 stars
The Rolling Stone Jazz Record Guide	4/5 stars

In Concert, Zürich, October 28, 1979 is a live double album by pianist Chick Corea and vibraphonist Gary Burton, recorded at the Limmathaus in Zürich and released on ECM the following year—the duo's third release for the label, following Crystal Silence (1973) and Duet (19.

== Technical details ==
In Concert was recorded live, as the title suggests, and released in 1980 as a double LP set. The original release contains 10 tracks with a total length of 79:59. The album was subsequently reissued on a single CD and in the process shortened to 8 tracks for a length of 61:16.

In 2009 the 4-CD set Crystal Silence, The ECM Recordings 1972-79 was released, containing the three albums: Crystal Silence (1973), Duet (1979) and the full LP-edition of In Concert (1980).

== Track listing ==
=== Original release ===
No.	Title	Length
1.	"Señor Mouse"	9:51
2.	"Bud Powell"	8:30
3.	"Crystal Silence"	11:52
4.	"Tweak"	5:58
5.	"I'm Your Pal / Hullo, Bolinas" (Burton solo)	6:58
6.	"Love Castle" (Corea solo)	14:35
7.	"Falling Grace"	5:04
8.	"Mirror, Mirror"	5:26
9.	"Song to Gayle"	6:57
10.	"Endless Trouble, Endless Pleasure"	4:48

=== CD reissue ===
No.	Title	Length
1.	"Señor Mouse"	10:17
2.	"Bud Powell"	8:40
3.	"Crystal Silence"	12:09
4.	"Tweak"	6:08
5.	"Falling Grace"	5:22
6.	"Mirror, Mirror"	5:47
7.	"Song to Gayle"	7:16
8.	"Endless Trouble, Endless Pleasure"	5:37

== Awards ==
In Concert won the 1982 Grammy Award for Best Jazz Instrumental Album, Individual or Group.

== Chart performance ==
Year	Chart	Position
1981	Billboard Jazz Albums	23

== Sources ==
Chick Corea, Gary Burton, and Steve Swallow. In Concert, Zürich, October 28, 1979 (LP recording, 1980). Burbank, California: ECM, distributed by Warner Bros. Records. OCLC 7289392.
