= Live at the Blue Note (Chick Corea album) =

Live album by Chick Corea and Origin
- Released: June 1998
- Recorded: December 1997
- Genre: Jazz
- Length: 65:23
- Label: Stretch
- Producer: Chick Corea

Chick Corea chronology
Native Sense - The New Duets (1997)	Live at the Blue Note (1998)	Like Minds (1998)

Professional ratings
Review scores
Source	Rating
Allmusic	3/5 stars
All About Jazz	(not rated)
Entertainment Weekly	(B)
The Penguin Guide to Jazz Recordings	4/4 stars

Live at the Blue Note is the first recording of the acoustic jazz sextet Origin featuring Chick Corea on piano. The album was recorded during a week-long gig in December 1997.

== Track listing ==
1. "Say It Again, Pt. 1" (Corea) – 1:30
2. "Say It Again, Pt. 2" (Corea) – 1:29
3. "Double Image" (Corea) – 17:31
4. "Dreamless" (Corea) – 10:53
5. "Molecules" (Corea) – 11:26
6. "Soul Mates" (Corea) – 9:00
7. "It Could Happen to You" (Johnny Burke, Jimmy Van Heusen) – 13:34

== Personnel ==
Musicians

- Chick Corea – piano
- Avishai Cohen – double bass
- Adam Cruz – drums
- Bob Sheppard – flute, bass clarinet, baritone saxophone, soprano saxophone, tenor saxophone
- Steve Wilson – flute, clarinet, alto and soprano saxophone
- Steve Davis – trombone

Production

- Chick Corea – producer, liner notes, executive producer, artwork, mixing
- Ron Moss – executive producer, photography
- Eric Seijo – engineer
- Bernie Kirsh – engineer (mixing)
- Alan Yoshida – engineer (mastering)
- Tom Banghart – assistant engineer
- Jordan d'Alessio – assistant engineer
- Darren Mora – assistant engineer
- Robert Read – assistant engineer
- Evelyn Brechtlein – project coordinator

== Chart performance ==
Year	Chart	Position
1998	Billboard Top Jazz Albums	23
