= Chick Corea Featuring Lionel Hampton =

Studio album by Chick Corea
- Released: 1980
- Recorded: 1971
- Genre: Fusion, Jazz fusion
- Label: Bellaphon
- Producer: Chick Corea

Chick Corea chronology
CoreaHancock (1979)	Chick Corea Featuring Lionel Hampton (1980)	Delphi II & III (1980)

Chick Corea Featuring Lionel Hampton is an album first released in 1980 by American jazz pianist Chick Corea. The album contains three songs from 1971 additionally featuring Dave Holland on bass, Jack DeJohnette on drums, Hubert Laws on flute and Woody Shaw on trumpet., but apparently not vibraphonist Lionel Hampton. There is a fourth song (Passion Dance), recorded in a different environment from Lionel Hampton with a different trio, not including Chick Corea. So actually there is no song where Chick and Lionel play together.

== Track listing ==
Side one

1. "Converge" – 8:05
2. "This" – 12:46

Side two

1. "Song of Wind" – 6:46
2. "Passion Dance" – 10:00

== Personnel ==
- Chick Corea – piano
- Dave Holland – bass
- Jack DeJohnette – drums
- Hubert Laws – flute
- Woody Shaw – trumpet
- Lionel Hampton – vibraphone
