= Circulus (album) =

Studio album by Chick Corea
- Released: 1978
- Recorded: April 8 and August 19 & 21, 1970
- Genre: Avant-garde jazz
- Length: 74:28
- Label: Blue Note

Chick Corea chronology
The Mad Hatter (1978)	Circulus (1978)	Secret Agent (1978)

Circle chronology
Circling In (1975)	Circulus (1978)

Circulus is a double LP released under jazz pianist Chick Corea’s name, featuring performances recorded in 1970 by the free jazz group Circle, which was first released on the Blue Note label in 1978.

== Reception ==
The AllMusic review by Scott Yanow stated, "The music is generally quite difficult with sound explorations emphasized over melodic development, and is much closer to the direction that Braxton would explore than what Corea would be playing two years later. But open-eared listeners who enjoy avant-garde jazz will find much to savor during these fascinating performances from one of the new music's top (if short-lived) regular groups".

Professional ratings
Review scores
Source	Rating
AllMusic	4.5/5 stars
The Rolling Stone Jazz Record Guide	4/5 stars

== Track listing ==
All compositions by Chick Corea, Anthony Braxton, Dave Holland, Barry Altschul except where noted.

Side one

1. "Drone" (Corea, Holland, Altschul) - 22:25

Side two

1. "Quartet Piece No. 1" - 16:13

Side three

1. "Quartet Piece No. 2" - 17:33

Side four

1. "Quartet Piece No. 3" - 12:25
2. "Percussion Piece" - 5:52
- Recorded at A&R Studios in New York City on April 8, 1970 (Side one), August 19, 1970 (Side four, track 2), and August 21, 1970 (Side two, Side three & Side four, track 1).

== Personnel ==
- Chick Corea – piano, celeste, vibes, percussion
- Anthony Braxton – alto saxophone, soprano saxophone, flute, clarinet, contrabass clarinet, percussion (sides 2–4)
- Dave Holland – bass, cello, guitar, percussion
- Barry Altschul – drums, percussion

== See also ==
- Chick Corea discography
- Anthony Braxton discography
