= Duetos =

Duetos may refer to:

- Duetos (Armando Manzanero album), a 2000 album by Mexican singer Armando Manzanero
- Duetos (Kumbia Kings album), a 2005 album released by A.B. Quintanilla and Los Kumbia Kings
- Duetos (Renato Russo album), a 2010 album by Brazilian singer Renato Russo

== See also ==
- Duets (disambiguation); "duetos" is Portuguese and Spanish for duets
