= Touchstone (album) =

Studio album by Chick Corea
- Released: 1982
- Studio: Mad Hatter Studios (Los Angeles, California)
- Genre: Jazz
- Length: 46:09
- Label: Warner Bros. Records
- Producer: Chick Corea

Chick Corea chronology
Trio Music (1982)	Touchstone (1982)	Again and Again (1983)

Professional ratings
Review scores
Source	Rating
AllMusic	3/5 stars
The Penguin Guide to Jazz Recordings	2.5/4 stars

Touchstone is an album by Chick Corea, released in 1982 through Warner Bros. Records. The album peaked at number nine on Billboard's Jazz Albums chart.

== Track listing ==
All tracks composed by Chick Corea.

1. "Touchstone: Procession, Ceremony, Departure" – 10:58
2. "The Yellow Nimbus" – 8:51
3. "Duende" – 3:11
4. "Compadres" – 9:41
5. "Estancia" – 6:18
6. "Dance of Chance" – 7:14

== Personnel ==
Musicians

- Chick Corea – Steinway D grand piano (1–3), Fairlight CMI (1), Oberheim OB-Xa (1, 2, 4–6), Yamaha GS-1 (1, 2, 4–6), gong (1), cymbals (1), Minimoog (2, 4–6), Fender Rhodes electric piano (4–6), Moog 55 Modular (5)
- Paco de Lucía – guitars (1, 2), handclaps (2)
- Al Di Meola – guitars (4)
- Carles Benavent – fretless electric bass (1, 6)
- Stanley Clarke – electric bass (4)
- Alex Acuña – snare drum (1), cymbals (1), cajón (1), drums (5, 6)
- Lenny White – drums (4)
- Laudir de Oliveira – ganzá (1), caxixi (5), woodblocks (5)
- Don Alias – lya drum (2), bongos (5), congas (5, 6)
- Gregg Gottlieb – cello (3)
- Bob Magnusson – double bass (3)
- Carol Shive – violin (3)
- Lee Konitz – alto saxophone (3)
- Steve Kujala – flute (6), tenor saxophone (6)
- Allen Vizzutti – trumpet (6)
- Gayle Moran – voices (1)

Production

- Ron Moss – executive producer
- Joel Strote – executive producer
- Chick Corea – producer, arrangements
- Bernie Kirsh – engineer
- Duncan Aldrich – assistant engineer
- Bernie Grundman – mastering at A&M Studios (Hollywood, California)
- Susan Garson – project coordinator
- Ken Whitman – art direction
- Peter Green – cover photography
- Catherine Goldwyn – liner photography
- Michael Manoogian – lettering
- Tony Cohan – liner notes

== Chart performance ==
Year	Chart	Position
1982	Billboard Jazz Albums	9
