= Is (Chick Corea album) =

Studio album by Chick Corea
- Released: June 30, 1969
- Recorded: May 11–13, 1969
- Studios: Bell Sound, New York City
- Genre: Free jazz
- Length: 51:46
- Label: Solid State
- Producer: Sonny Lester

Chick Corea chronology
Now He Sings, Now He Sobs (1968)	Is (1969)	The Sun (1971)

Professional ratings
Review scores
Source	Rating
AllMusic	4.5/5 stars
DownBeat	2.5/5 stars

Is is the third studio album by Chick Corea, recorded over three days in May 1969 and released on Solid State Records later that year. The album features a septet with trumpeter Woody Shaw, tenor saxophonist Bennie Maupin, flautist Hubert Laws, bassist Dave Holland and drummers Jack DeJohnette & Horace Arnold.

In 2002, Blue Note Records re-released all the tracks from this album, together with Sundance (1972), along with alternate takes from both albums as The Complete "Is" Sessions.

== Reception ==
Harvey Pekar, in a contemporary review for DownBeat, wrote "in view of the excellence Corea has demonstrated in the past, this record is disappointing", and that it was "an uneven but sometimes interesting LP".

== Track listing ==
All music composed by Chick Corea except as noted.

=== Side one ===
1. "Is" – 28:54

=== Side two ===
1. "Jamala" – 14:04 (Dave Holland)
2. "This" – 8:18
3. "It" – 0:30

== Personnel ==
- Chick Corea – piano, electric piano
- Woody Shaw – trumpet
- Bennie Maupin – tenor saxophone
- Hubert Laws – flute, piccolo
- Dave Holland – acoustic bass
- Jack DeJohnette – drums
- Horace Arnold – drums & percussion

== See also ==
- The Complete "Is" Sessions (Blue Note, 2002)
