= Raymond Michalski =

American operatic bass-baritone (born 1933)

Raymond Michalski (born 8 June 1933) is an American operatic bass-baritone.

Michalski was born in Bayonne, New Jersey. He studied voice with Rosalie Miller at the Mannes School of Music in New York City before making his professional stage debut in 1959 as Nourabad in Georges Bizet's Les pecheurs de perles with the Philadelphia Grand Opera Company. In 1964 he sang the role of Talbot in the United States premiere of Gaetano Donizetti's Maria Stuarda in concert form at Carnegie Hall. He portrayed Ahner in the world premiere of Hugo Weisgall's opera Athaliah on February 17, 1964 at Philharmonic Hall, New York. In 1965 he joined the roster of singers at the Metropolitan Opera; making his Met debut on December 29, 1965, as the King in Giuseppe Verdi's Aida. Over the next 11 years he gave 301 performances at the Met in a total of 32 roles. The bass died of cancer 24 Dec 1978 in Elizabeth, New Jersey.
