= Sundance (album) =

Studio album by Chick Corea
- Released: February 1972
- Recorded: May 11–13, 1969
- Genre: Jazz
- Length: 36:15
- Label: Groove Merchant
- Producer: Sonny Lester

Chick Corea chronology
Piano Improvisations Vol. 1 (1971)	Sundance (1972)	Piano Improvisations Vol. 2 (1972)

Professional ratings
Review scores
Source	Rating
AllMusic	1.5/5 stars

Sundance is a studio album by jazz pianist Chick Corea, recorded over three days in May 1969 and released on Groove Merchant in February 1972. The album Is (released three years earlier) included material from the same sessions. The album features a septet with trumpeter Woody Shaw, tenor saxophonist Bennie Maupin, flautist Hubert Laws, bassist Dave Holland and drummers Jack DeJohnette and Horace Arnold.

In 2002, Blue Note re-released all of the material for the session, with alternate takes from both albums, as The Complete "Is" Sessions.

== Track listing ==
All tracks are written by Chick Corea.

Side one
No.	Title	Length
1.	"The Brain"	10:09
2.	"Song of the Wind"	8:05

Side two
No.	Title	Length
1.	"Converge"	7:59
2.	"Sundance"	10:02

== Personnel ==
- Chick Corea – piano
- Hubert Laws – flute, piccolo flute
- Bennie Maupin – tenor saxophone
- Woody Shaw – trumpet
- Dave Holland – bass
- Jack DeJohnette – drums
- Horace Arnold – drums

== See also ==
- The Complete "Is" Sessions (Blue Note, 2002)
