= Three Quartets =

Studio album by Chick Corea
- Released: July 1981
- Recorded: January/February 1981
- Studio: Mad Hatter Studios Los Angeles, California
- Genre: Post-bop, jazz
- Length: 39:08 (original album) / 61:03 (CD reissue)
- Label: Stretch Records
- Producer: Chick Corea

Chick Corea chronology
In Concert, Zürich, October 28, 1979 (1980)	Three Quartets (1981)	Trio Music (1982)

Professional ratings
Review scores
Source	Rating
AllMusic	4.5/5 stars
The Rolling Stone Jazz Record Guide	3/5 stars

Three Quartets is a studio album released in 1981 by jazz pianist Chick Corea, in collaboration with tenor saxophonist Michael Brecker, bassist Eddie Gómez and drummer Steve Gadd.

== Composition ==
All compositions are by Corea who wanted to create an album of quartets like the many string quartets of the Baroque, Classical, Romantic and Impressionist periods, but with jazz instrumentation.

"Quartet No. 1" uses a 1-chord (G altered) solo vamp over a rock beat in 3/4, and a repeated theme that uses stacked fourths. The third track, "Quartet No. 2 (Part I)" is a ballad, dedicated to jazz pioneer Duke Ellington, incorporating many of the Western classical harmonies and tensions that Ellington used in much of his playing. "Quartet No. 2 (Part II)" is dedicated to jazz saxophone legend John Coltrane.

== Track listing ==
All compositions by Chick Corea except as noted.

1. "Quartet No. 1" – (10:16)
2. "Quartet No. 3" – (9:41)
3. "Quartet No. 2" - Part I (Dedicated to Duke Ellington)" – (7:09)
4. "Quartet No. 2" - Part II (Dedicated to John Coltrane)" – (12:01)

The CD reissue contains several tracks that were recorded during the same sessions as the original album but not released at the time. These are:

5. "Folk Song" – (5:51)
6. "Hairy Canary" – (3:43)
7. "Slippery When Wet" – (6:02)
8. "Confirmation" (Charlie Parker) – (6:17)

Corea plays drums on "Confirmation" instead of Steve Gadd.

== Personnel ==
Musicians

- Chick Corea – piano; drums (track 8)
- Michael Brecker – tenor saxophone
- Eddie Gómez – double bass
- Steve Gadd – drums (tracks 1–7)

Production

- Bernie Kirsh – recording and mixing engineer
- Duncan Aldrich – assistant engineer
- Joel Strote – associate executive producer
- Adam Zelinka – post producer
- Stephen Marcussen – remastering
- Sonny Mediana – graphic design
- Andy Baltimore – creative director
- Dan Serrano – graphic design
- Andy Ruggirello – graphic design
- Darryl Pitt – photography
- Susan Garson – project coordinator
- Richard Veloso – art producer

== Chart performance ==
Year	Chart	Position
1981	Billboard 200	179
1981	Billboard Jazz Albums	17
