= Circling In =

Studio album by Chick Corea
- Released: 1975
- Recorded: March 14, 19 & 27, 1968, and April 7, August 13 & 19, 1970
- Studio: A & R, New York City
- Genre: Avant-garde jazz
- Label: Blue Note

Chick Corea chronology
No Mystery (1975)	Circling In (1975)	The Leprechaun (1976)

Circle chronology
Paris Concert (1972)	Circling In (1975)	Circulus (1978)

Circling In is a double LP collection by jazz pianist Chick Corea featuring performances recorded between 1968 and 1970, including the first recordings by the group Circle, which was first released on the Blue Note label in 1975. It contains trio performances by Corea with Miroslav Vitouš and Roy Haynes recorded in March 1968, which were later added to the CD reissue of Now He Sings, Now He Sobs as bonus tracks, and performances by permutations of the band Circle recorded in April and July 1970 some of which were later released as Early Circle.

== Reception ==
The AllMusic review by Scott Yanow stated that the album "gives one a clear picture into the evolution of pianist Chick Corea during the 1968-70 period."

Professional ratings
Review scores
Source	Rating
AllMusic	4.5/5 stars
The Rolling Stone Jazz Record Guide	4/5 stars

== Track listing ==
All compositions by Chick Corea except where noted.

Side one

1. "Bossa" - 4:45
2. "Gemini" - 4:17
3. "My One and Only Love" (Guy Wood, Robert Mellin) - 3:33
4. "Fragments" - 4:01
5. "Windows" - 3:08

Side two

1. "Samba Yanta" - 2:38
2. "I Don't Know" - 2:38
3. "Pannonica" (Thelonious Monk) - 2:58
4. "Blues Connotation" - 7:17
5. "Duet for Bass and Piano No.1" (Chick Corea, Dave Holland) - 3:28
6. "Duet for Bass and Piano No.2" (Corea, Holland) - 1:40

Side three

1. "Danse for Clarinet and Piano No.1" (Corea, Anthony Braxton) - 2:14
2. "Danse for Clarinet and Piano No.2" (Corea, Braxton) - 2:32
3. "Chimes Part 1" (Corea, Braxton, Holland) - 10:20
4. "Chimes Part 2" (Corea, Braxton, Holland) - 6:40

Side four

1. "Starp" (Holland) - 5:20
2. "73º - A Kelvin" (Braxton) - 9:09
3. "Ballad" (Barry Altschul, Braxton, Corea, Holland) - 6:41

== Personnel ==
March 14, 1968 (Side one, tracks 1 & 3), March 19, 1968 (Side one, tracks 2 & 4), March 27, 1968 (Side one, track 5 and Side two, tracks 1–3)

- Chick Corea – piano, celeste, vibes, percussion
- Miroslav Vitouš – double bass
- Roy Haynes – drums

April 7, 1970 ("Blues Connotation"), August 13, 1970 ("Duet for Bass and Piano Nos. 1 & 2")

- Chick Corea – piano, celeste, vibes, percussion
- Dave Holland – double bass, cello, guitar
- Barry Altschul – drums, percussion

August 13, 1970 (Side three)

- Chick Corea – piano, celeste, vibes, percussion
- Anthony Braxton – alto saxophone, soprano saxophone, flute, clarinet, contrabass clarinet, percussion

August 19, 1970 (Side four)

- Chick Corea – piano, celeste, vibes, percussion
- Anthony Braxton – alto saxophone, soprano saxophone, flute, clarinet, contrabass clarinet, percussion
- Dave Holland – double bass, cello, guitar
- Barry Altschul – drums, percussion
