= The Mad Hatter (album) =

Mad Hatter

Studio album by Chick Corea
- Released: 1978
- Recorded: November 1977
- Studio: Kendun Recorders (Burbank, California)
- Genre: Jazz fusion, progressive rock
- Length: 50:03
- Label: Polydor
- Producer: Chick Corea

Chick Corea chronology
Live (Return to Forever album) (1978)	Mad Hatter (1978)	Circulus (1978)

Professional ratings
Review scores
Source	Rating
AllMusic	2.5/5 stars
DownBeat	4/5 stars
The Penguin Guide to Jazz Recordings	2.5/4 stars
The Rolling Stone Jazz Record Guide	2/5 stars

Mad Hatter is a studio album by Chick Corea. Released in 1978, it is a concept album inspired by Lewis Carroll's 1865 novel Alice's Adventures in Wonderland.

== Track listing ==
All tracks composed by Chick Corea. "Falling Alice" and "Dear Alice" include additional lyrics by Gayle Moran.

Side one
No.	Title	Length
1.	"The Woods"	4:26
2.	"Tweedle Dee"	1:08
3.	"The Trial"	1:40
4.	"Humpty Dumpty"	6:30
5.	"Prelude to Falling Alice"	1:19
6.	"Falling Alice"	8:18

Side two
No.	Title	Length
1.	"Tweedle Dum"	2:52
2.	"Dear Alice"	13:07
3.	"The Mad Hatter Rhapsody"	10:44
Total length:		50:03

== Personnel ==
- Chick Corea – acoustic piano (A1–B3); Fender Rhodes electric piano (A6); ARP Odyssey, Minimoog, Polymoog, Moog Model 15 modular, Moog Sample & Hold, Oberheim Eight Voice synthesizers (A1, A6); MXR Digital Delay, Eventide Harmonizer (A1); marimba (A1, B2); finger cymbals (A5, B2); African shaker, cowbell, arrangements, producer
- Joe Farrell – tenor saxophone (A4, A6); flute (A3, A5, A6, B2, B3), concert flute (B2)
- Herbie Hancock – Fender Rhodes electric piano ((B3))
- Jamie Faunt – double bass (A3, A5, B1)
- Eddie Gómez – double bass (A4, A6, B2, B3)
- Steve Gadd – drums (A4, A6, B2, B3)
- Harvey Mason – drums (A3, A5)
- Gayle Moran – vocals (A3, A6, B1–B3)

Brass:

- Stewart Blumberg – trumpet (A3, A5, A6, B2, B3)
- John Rosenburg – trumpet (A3, A5, A6, B2, B3)
- John Thomas – trumpet (A5, A6, B2, B3)
- Ron Moss – trombone (A3, A5, A6, B3)

Strings:

- Charles Veal – violin (A2, A3, A5, A6, B1–B3)
- Kenneth Yerke – violin (A2, A3, A5, A6, B1–B3)
- Denyse Buffum – viola (A2, A3, A5, A6, B1, B2)
- Michael Nowack – viola (B3)
- Dennis Karmazyn – cello (A2, A3, A5, A6, B1–B3)

== Charts ==
Chart (1978)	Peak position
US Billboard Billboard Top Jazz Albums	6
US Billboard Top Pop Albums	61
