= A.R.C. (album) =

Studio album by Chick Corea / Dave Holland / Barry Altschul
- Released: April 15, 1971
- Recorded: January 11–13, 1971
- Studios: Tonstudio Bauer; Ludwigsburg, W. Germany
- Genre: Jazz
- Length: 40:29
- Labels: ECM; ECM 1009 ST
- Producer: Manfred Eicher

Chick Corea chronology
The Song of Singing (1970)	A.R.C. (1971)	Piano Improvisations Vol. 1 (1971)

David Holland chronology
Where Fortune Smiles (1971)	A.R.C. (1971)	Music from Two Basses (1971)

A.R.C. is an album by American jazz pianist Chick Corea, British jazz bassist Dave Holland and American jazz drummer Barry Altschul, recorded over January 11–13, 1971 and released on ECM later that year.

== Background ==
The trio had recently recorded Corea's The Song of Singing together, which also features a version of Wayne Shorter's "Nefertiti".

This is the first project in Holland's long association with ECM.

=== Title ===
The album title stands for "affinity, reality, communication", a phrase used in Scientology, with which Corea had recently become involved.

== Reception ==
The AllMusic review by Scott Yanow states, "This LP features pianist Chick Corea, bassist Dave Holland and drummer Barry Altschul during the brief period that, along with Anthony Braxton, they were members of the fine avant-garde quartet Circle. The music heard on this set is not quite as free as Circle's but often very explorative ... a very viable set of adventurous jazz, recorded just a few months before Corea changed direction."

Professional ratings
Review scores
Source	Rating
AllMusic	4/5 stars
The Rolling Stone Jazz Record Guide	2/5 stars
The Penguin Guide to Jazz Recordings	3/4 stars

== Track listing ==
All tracks are written by Chick Corea, except as noted.

Side I
No.	Title	Writer(s)	Length
1.	"Nefertiti"	Wayne Shorter	9:40
2.	"Ballad for Tillie"	Altschul; Corea; Holland	5:25
3.	"A.R.C."		5:39
Total length:			20:44

Side II
No.	Title	Writer(s)	Length
1.	"Vadana"	Holland	7:35
2.	"Thanatos"		4:30
3.	"Games"		7:40
Total length:			19:45 40:29

== Personnel ==
Musicians

- Chick Corea – acoustic piano
- David Holland – bass
- Barry Altschul – drums, percussions

Production

- Manfred Eicher – producer
- Kurt Rapp – engineer
- B & B Wojirsch – cover design

== See also ==
- Circle – A group featuring Corea, Holland and Altschul.
