= The Leprechaun (Chick Corea album) =

Studio album by Chick Corea
- Released: 1976
- Recorded: 1975
- Genre: Jazz
- Length: 38:04
- Label: Polydor
- Producer: Chick Corea

Chick Corea chronology
| Circling In (1975) | The Leprechaun (1976) | Romantic Warrior (1976) |

Professional ratings
Review scores
| Source | Rating |
|---|---|
| AllMusic | 2/5 stars |
| The Penguin Guide to Jazz Recordings | 2.5/4 stars |
| The Rolling Stone Jazz Record Guide | 4/5 stars |

The Leprechaun is a studio album by Chick Corea, released in 1976. It features horn and string sections, and vocals from Corea’s wife Gayle Moran, formerly of Mahavishnu Orchestra.

The album was recorded during Corea's time with his jazz fusion group Return to Forever. Though the album is more jazz oriented than anything Return to Forever had produced up to that time, the fusion edge still rings through quite clearly. Corea was awarded the Grammy Award for Best Jazz Performance by a Group for the album and the Grammy Award for the Best Instrumental Arrangement for "Leprechaun's Dream, Pt. 1" at the 19th Annual Grammy Awards in 1977.

== Track listing ==
All pieces composed by Chick Corea unless otherwise noted.

=== Side one ===
1. "Imp's Welcome" – 2:56
2. "Lenore" – 3:26
3. "Reverie" – 2:01
4. "Looking at the World" (Lyrics: Neville Potter) – 5:29
5. "Night Sprite" – 4:33

=== Side two ===
1. "Soft and Gentle" (Gayle Moran) – 5:09
2. "Pixieland Rag" – 1:11
3. "Leprechaun's Dream Part 1" – 6:29
4. "Leprechaun's Dream Part 2" – 6:34

== Personnel ==
Musicians

- Chick Corea – acoustic piano, Fender Rhodes electric piano, Yamaha electric organ, Hohner clavinet, synthesizers (ARP Odyssey, Micromoog, Moog Model 15 modular synthesizer), percussion
- Danny Cahn, John Gatchell, Bob Millikan – trumpet
- Wayne Andre, Bill Watrous – trombone
- Joe Farrell – saxophone, flute
- Ani Kavafian, Ida Kavafian – violin
- Louise Shulman – viola
- Fred Sherry – cello
- Eddie Gómez – double bass
- Anthony Jackson – bass guitar
- Steve Gadd – drums
- Gayle Moran – vocals

Production

- Chick Corea – producer
- Bernie Kirsh – engineer (mixing)
- Michael Frondelli – assistant engineer
- Peter Corriston – art direction, design
- David Palladini – illustration
- Leonid Lubianitsky – photography

== Chart performance ==
| Year | Chart | Position |
|---|---|---|
| 1976 | Billboard 200 | 42 |
| 1976 | Billboard R&B Albums | 32 |
| 1976 | Billboard Jazz Albums | 1 |
