= Piano Improvisations Vol. 1 =

Studio album by Chick Corea
- Released: 1971
- Recorded: April 21–22, 1971
- Studio: Ame Bendiksen Studio; Oslo, Norway
- Genre: Jazz
- Length: 41:43
- Label: ECM; ECM 1014 ST
- Producer: Manfred Eicher

Chick Corea chronology
A.R.C. (1971)	Piano Improvisations Vol. 1 (1971)	Sundance (1972)

Piano Improvisations Vol. 1 is a studio album (and first solo piano album) by American jazz pianist Chick Corea, recorded over two days in April 1971 and released on ECM later that year. The session also produced Piano Improvisations Vol. 2 (1972), released the following year.

== Reception ==
Professional ratings
Review scores
Source	Rating
AllMusic	2.5/5 stars
The Rolling Stone Jazz Record Guide	5/5 stars
The Penguin Guide to Jazz Recordings	3.5/4 stars

Scott Yanow of AllMusic described Piano Improvisations Vols. 1 & 2 as an accessible transition between Circle and Return to Forever, as Corea moved away from the avant-garde to communicate with a wider audience.

== Track listing ==
All tracks are written by Chick Corea, except as noted.

Side I
No.	Title	Writer(s)	Length
1.	"Noon Song"		4:00
2.	"Song for Sally"		3:45
3.	"Ballad for Anna"		2:25
4.	"Song of the Wind"		3:10
5.	"Sometime Ago"	Chick Corea; Neville Potter	8:20
Total length:			21:40

Side II: Where Are You Now? – A Suite of Eight Pictures
No.	Title	Length
1.	"Picture 1"	4:53
2.	"Picture 2"	2:03
3.	"Picture 3"	2:30
4.	"Picture 4"	2:40
5.	"Picture 5"	0:32
6.	"Picture 6"	3:55
7.	"Picture 7"	1:55
8.	"Picture 8"	1:35
Total length:		20:03 41:43

== Personnel ==
- Chick Corea – piano

Production

- Manfred Eicher – producer
- Jan-Erik Kongshaug – engineer
- B & B Wojirsch – cover design
- Valerie Wilmer – photography
