= Delphi II & III =

Delphi 2&3
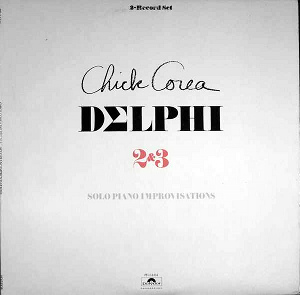

Studio album by Chick Corea
- Released: 1980
- Recorded: October 26–27, 1978
- Studio: The Delphian Foundation, Sheridan, Oregon
- Genre: Jazz
- Length: 93:36
- Label: Polydor
- Producer: Chick Corea

Chick Corea chronology
| Chick Corea Featuring Lionel Hampton (1980) | Delphi 2&3 (1980) | Tap Step (1980) |

Professional ratings
Review scores
| Source | Rating |
|---|---|
| Allmusic | 1.5/5 stars |

Delphi 2 & 3, Solo Piano Improvisations is a double studio album recorded by pianist Chick Corea and released in 1980.

== Track listing ==
All music composed by Chick Corea.

=== Delphi 2 Side One ===
1. "New World I" – 1:02
2. "New World II" – 0:40
3. "New World III" – 1:26
4. "New World IV" – 1:08
5. "New World V" – 1:25
6. "New World VI" – 1:01
7. "Sad Song" – 9:17
8. "Samba" – 2:36
9. "North Brazil" – 3:20

=== Delphi 2 Side Two ===
1. "Mountain Top" – 6:39
2. "Voices" – 2:41
3. "Spirits" – 7:03
4. "Waltze for my Folks" – 4:48
5. "Unicorns I" – 2:17
6. "Unicorns II" – 2:17

=== Delphi 3 Side One ===
1. "Mime I" – 3:58
2. "Mime II" – 4:48
3. "Ballet I" – 2:37
4. "Ballet II" – 0:38
5. "Ballet III" – 2:59
6. "Ballet IV" – 1:08
7. "Ballet V" – 0:32
8. "Ballet VI" – 1:48
9. "Ballet VII" – 0:31
10. "Ballet VIII" – 0:25
11. "Ballet IX" – 0:20
12. "Ballet X" – 0:53
13. "Ballet XI" – 0:40
14. "Ballet XII" – 0:38
15. "Poem I (Home)" – 3:53

=== Delphi 3 Side Two ===
1. "Concerto Flamenco" – 11:08
2. "Poem II (Liana)" – 3:17
3. "Poem III (Thaddeus)" – 3:26
4. "Poem IV (Remember the Hearts)" – 4:46
5. "Poem V (Remember the Hearts)" – 3:11

== Personnel ==
- Chick Corea – piano

== See also ==
- Delphi I (Polydor, 1979)
