= Trilogy 2 =

Live album by Chick Corea
- Released: December 5, 2018
- Recorded: 2010–2016
- Venues: Bologna, Rockport, Minneapolis, Zurich, St. Louis, Ottawa, Rochester, Oakland, Ottawa and Tokyo
- Genre: Jazz
- Labels: Universal Music (Japan), Concord
- Producers: Chick Corea, Bernie Kirsh

Chick Corea chronology
Chinese Butterfly (2017)	Trilogy 2 (2018)	Antidote (2019)

Trilogy 2 is a live album by Chick Corea with Christian McBride and Brian Blade. It was first released in 2018 in Japan on the Universal Music label, and in 2019 by Concord Records. The album is a follow-up to Trilogy, which was issued in 2013.

== Reception ==
Professional ratings
Review scores
Source	Rating
All About Jazz	4.5/5 stars
AllMusic	4/5 stars
DownBeat	4/5 stars
Financial Times	5/5 stars
Jazz Journal	4.5/5 stars
Jazzwise	4/5 stars
The Times	5/5 stars

The album was awarded Best Jazz Instrumental Album at the 63rd Annual Grammy Awards. The track "All Blues" won for Best Improvised Jazz Solo.

DownBeat's James Hale wrote: "the combination of Corea, bassist Christian McBride and drummer Brian Blade will stand among [Corea's] finest. The pair are Corea's equal in both artistic breadth and technical facility, but most of all, they can match him on the buoyancy meter."

In a review for AllMusic, Matt Collar noted the musicians' "intuitive, almost psychic interplay," and stated: "Part of what makes Corea, McBride, and Blade's work together so compelling is how rhythmically kinetic it is. McBride and Blade are both immensely rhythmic, muscular performers who punctuate every phrase and accent with deft articulation."

Mike Hobart of the Financial Times called the album "An intense and inventive return to the acoustic mainstream packed with detail and gripping throughout."

Jazz Journal's Francis Graham-Dixon stated that the album "provides a seamless and welcome continuity with" Trilogy, and commented: "Chick Corea devotees will not be disappointed by this further exposition of great improvised music-making by one of the finest trios in contemporary jazz."

Writing for All About Jazz, Jim Worsley remarked: "Three musicians of substance further engaging in each other's world can lead to beautiful moments of improvisational bliss. They clearly are having fun playing together, and that enjoyment is transferred onto the listener in droves."

In an article for OffBeat, Geraldine Wyckoff noted that the album "abounds with brilliance," and wrote: "Listeners should join the audience in its obvious appreciation of the Chick Corea Trio's magnificent performance as captured on Trilogy 2."

Glide Magazine's Jim Hynes commented: "At 78 Corea sounds as vital as ever and these three are among the very best on their respective instruments. Music doesn't get any better than this."

== Track listing ==
=== Disc one ===
1. "How Deep Is The Ocean" (Irving Berlin) – 12:49
2. "500 Miles High" (Chick Corea) – 11:02
3. "Crepuscule With Nellie" (Thelonious Monk) – 6:40
4. "Work" (Thelonious Monk) – 4:54
5. "But Beautiful" (Jimmy Van Heusen, Johnny Burke) – 9:02
6. "La Fiesta" (Chick Corea) – 7:11

=== Disc two ===
1. "Eiderdown" (Steve Swallow) – 11:08
2. "All Blues" (Miles Davis) – 11:35
3. "Pastime Paradise" (Stevie Wonder) – 8:27
4. "Now He Sings, Now He Sobs" (Chick Corea) – 16:18
5. "Serenity" (Joe Henderson) – 7:40
6. "Lotus Blossom" (Kenny Dorham) – 10:13

== Personnel ==
Musicians

- Chick Corea – piano
- Christian McBride – bass
- Brian Blade – drums

Production

- Chick Corea – producer
- Bernie Kirsh – co-producer, engineer (recording, mixing)
- Brian Vibberts – engineer (mixing)
- David Ives – engineer (mastering)
- Dan Muse – project manager, photography
- Kris Campbell – tour manager
- Marc Bessant – –graphic design
- Robin D. G. Kelley – liner notes
