= Friends (Chick Corea album) =

Studio album by Chick Corea
- Released: 1978
- Recorded: 1978
- Studio: Kendun Recorders, Burbank, California, USA
- Genre: Jazz
- Length: 51:12
- Label: Polydor
- Producer: Chick Corea

Chick Corea chronology
| Secret Agent (1978) | Friends (1978) | An Evening with Herbie Hancock & Chick Corea: In Concert (1978) |

Professional ratings
Review scores
| Source | Rating |
|---|---|
| AllMusic | 4/5 stars |
| The Penguin Guide to Jazz | 3/4 stars |
| The Rolling Stone Jazz Record Guide | 2/5 stars |

Friends is a studio album by Chick Corea. It features a quartet of Corea, saxophonist Joe Farrell, acoustic bassist Eddie Gómez and drummer Steve Gadd. It was released by Polydor Records in 1978, and the cover featured The Smurfs.

Friends received the 1979 Grammy award for Best Jazz Instrumental Performance, Group.

== Track listing ==
All pieces are composed by Chick Corea.

=== Side one ===
1. "The One Step" – 6:05
2. "Waltse for Dave" – 7:32
3. "Children's Song #5" – 1:15
4. "Samba Song" – 10:00

=== Side two ===
1. "Friends" – 9:26
2. "Sicily" – 6:15
3. "Children's Song #15" – 1:10
4. "Cappucino" – 8:39

== Personnel ==
- Chick Corea – Steinway acoustic grand piano, Fender Rhodes electric piano
- Joe Farrell – soprano saxophone, tenor saxophone, flute
- Eddie Gómez – double bass
- Steve Gadd – drums

== Chart performance ==
| Year | Chart | Position |
|---|---|---|
| 1978 | Billboard 200 | 86 |
| 1978 | Billboard Jazz Albums | 4 |
