= Allen Vizzutti =

American trumpeter (born 1952)

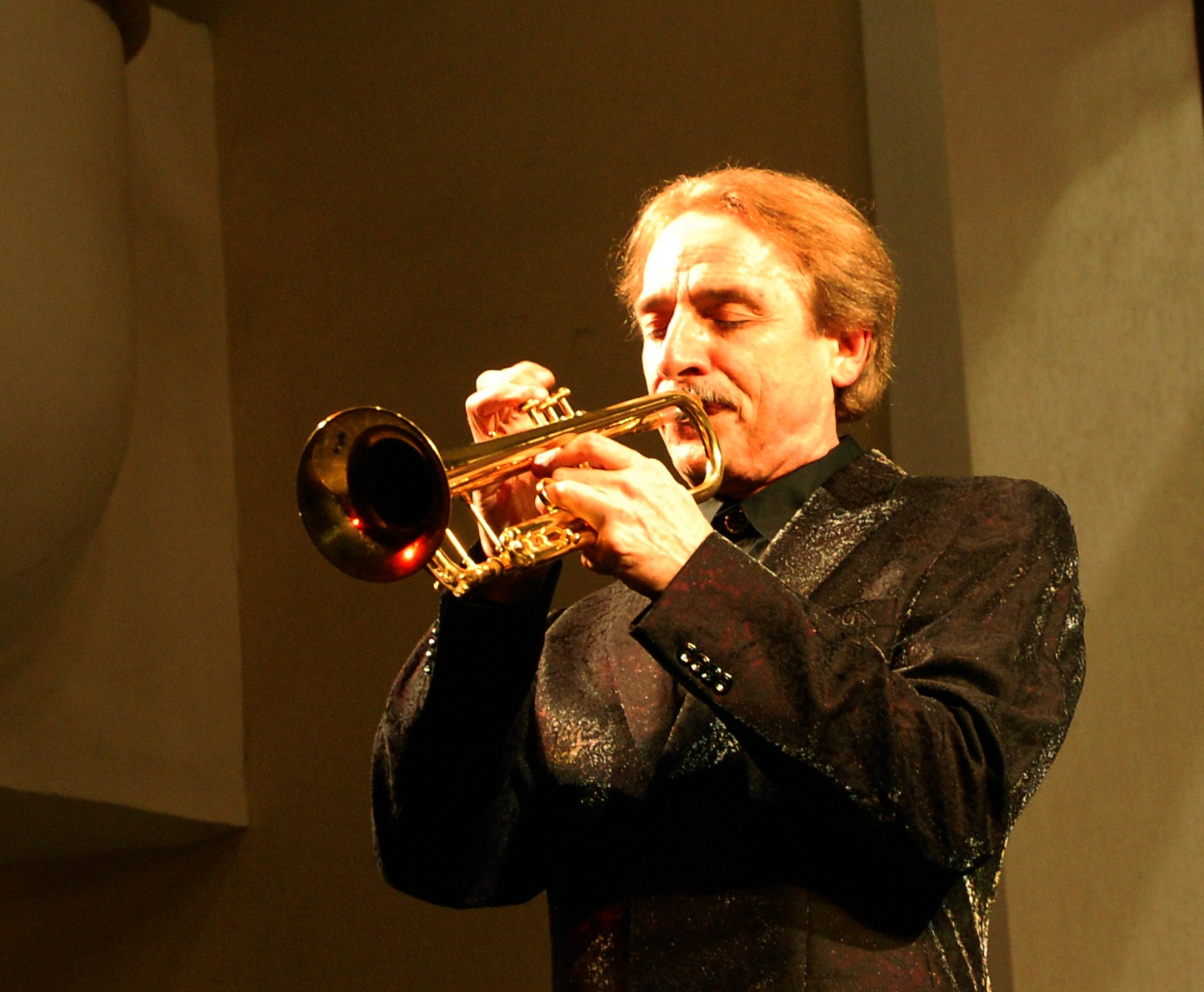
- Allen Vizzutti. Rostov-on-Don, 2010

Background information
- Born: September 13, 1952 (age 74); Missoula, Montana
- Genre: Jazz
- Occupation: Musician
- Instrument: Trumpet
- Website: vizzutti.com

Allen Vizzutti (born September 13, 1952) is an American trumpeter, composer and music educator.

== Biography ==
Born and raised in Missoula, Montana, Vizzutti, who is of Italian heritage, learned the trumpet from his father, Lido Vizzutti. At age 16, Vizzutti won the concerto competition and was awarded first chair in the World Youth Symphony Orchestra at Interlochen, Michigan. He earned a B.M., M.M., a Performer's Certificate, and the Artist's Diploma from the Eastman School of Music in Rochester, New York.

Vizzutti has performed with The Airmen of Note, The Army Blues, Chick Corea, Woody Herman, Chuck Mangione, Doc Severinsen, The Tonight Show Band, Bill Watrous, and the NHK Symphony Orchestra and Kosei Wind Orchestra of Japan. He has performed as a solo act at the Hollywood Bowl, Carnegie Hall, Newport Jazz Festival, Banff Center for the Performing Arts, Montreux Jazz Festival, the Charles Ives Center, and the Lincoln Center in New York.

He has performed on more than 150 motion picture soundtracks, such as: Back to the Future, Star Trek, The Black Stallion, Rocky II, Poltergeist II, Firefox, Sudden Impact, 10, Under the Cherry Moon, Broadcast News, The Electric Horseman and 1941.

Vizzutti composed orchestral works, which led to world premieres by the Los Angeles Philharmonic, Phoenix Symphony, Greater Bridgeport Symphony Orchestra, Rochester Philharmonic and the Tonight Show Orchestra, Eastman School of Music Wind Ensemble, as well as recorded works by the Royal Philharmonic of London, the Woody Herman Band, the Summit Brass and the London Symphony Orchestra.

Vizzutti has taught at the Eastman School of Music, University of Washington, the Banff Center for the Performing Arts, Kansas State University, West Texas State University, the University of South Carolina, University of North Texas, Skidmore Jazz Institute, and the Trompeten Akademie of Bremen, Germany.
