= Tony Cohan =

American novelist

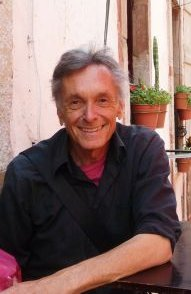
- Cohan in Guanajuato. Photo by David Lida, davidlida.com
- Born: December 28, 1939 (age 86); New York, U.S.
- Occupations: Novelist; travel writer; lyricist
- Writing career
- Notable works: On Mexican Time; Canary; Opium
- Website: tonycohan.com

Tony Cohan (born December 28, 1939) is an American travel writer, novelist, and lyricist. His best known work of travel writing is On Mexican Time. His novel Canary was selected New York Times Notable Book of the Year, and his novel Opium was a Literary Guild Selection. His memoir Native State was chosen Los Angeles Times Notable Book of the Year. His essays, travel writings, and reviews have appeared in The New York Times, the Los Angeles Times, and the Times of London.

He was a jazz drummer as a teenager, and attended Stanford University and the University of California, Santa Barbara. In 1962, he drummed for Dexter Gordon and Bud Powell in Copenhagen. Later in that year, he drummed for Tete Montoliu and Memphis Slim in Barcelona. He worked as a studio musician with Lowell George, Ry Cooder, and others. During the 1970s he designed media campaigns for musical artists including Van Morrison, Pink Floyd, and Prince. His lyric collaborations with pianist and composer Chick Corea include the jazz classic "High Wire: The Aerialist", the Grammy-winning "Bud Powell", and stories with piano accompaniment performed on National Public Radio.

In 1975 he founded the long-running independent press Acrobat Books, publishing nonfiction books in the arts.

He and his former wife Masako Takahashi relocated to San Miguel de Allende, Mexico in 1985. San Miguel de Allende became the subject of On Mexican Time. He now divides his time between Guanajuato City, Mexico and California.

In recent years, he has returned to writing fiction, with two completed novels and a third one in progress. He publishes the newsletter Writing Unchained, and this includes two novels, Valparaíso and The Coast.

== Bibliography ==
=== Novels ===
- Canary (1981) (ISBN 0-9182-2637-6)
- Opium (1984) (ISBN 0-6714-7327-1)

=== Non-fiction ===
- Mexicolor: The Spirit of Mexican Design (with Masako Takahashi and Melba Levick) (1998) (ISBN 0-8118-1893-4)
- On Mexican Time (2001) (ISBN 0-7679-0319-6)
- Native State (2003) (ISBN 0-7679-1022-2)
- Mexican Days (2007) (ISBN 0-7679-2091-0)

=== Essays and short stories ===
- Nine Ships (1975) (ISBN 0-9182-2600-7)
- The Flame (1983) (ISBN 0-9182-2610-4)
- Outlaw Visions (with Gordon Beam) (1987) (ISBN 0-9182-2604-X)

=== Notable songs ===
- "Samba L.A."
- "The Embrace"
- "High Wire: The Aerialist"
- "Paquito"
- "Bud Powell"
- "Contessa"

Writing Unchained With Tony Cohan - Substack
