= Duet (Gary Burton & Chick Corea album) =

Studio album by Gary Burton & Chick Corea
- Released: May 25, 1979
- Recorded: October 23–25, 1978
- Studio: Delphian Foundation; Sheridan, Oregon
- Genre: Jazz
- Length: 51:18
- Label: ECM 1140
- Producer: Chick Corea, Gary Burton

Gary Burton & Chick Corea chronology
Crystal Silence (1973)	Duet (1979)	In Concert, Zürich, October 28, 1979 (1980)

Gary Burton chronology
Times Square (1978)	Duet (1979)	In Concert, Zürich, October 28, 1979 (1980)

Chick Corea chronology
An Evening with Herbie Hancock & Chick Corea: In Concert (1978)	Duet (1979)	Delphi I (1979)

Duet is the second album by vibraphone–piano duo Gary Burton and Chick Corea, recorded over three days in October 1978 and released by ECM Records in May of the following year.

== Background ==
The title track, "La Fiesta", was originally recorded by Corea with his quintet for Sometime Ago – La Fiesta, the working title for Return to Forever (1972), which gave birth to the pioneering jazz fusion band of the same name.

== Reception ==
Professional ratings
Review scores
Source	Rating
AllMusic	4/5 stars
DownBeat	4/5 stars
The Penguin Guide to Jazz Recordings	2.5/4 stars
The Rolling Stone Jazz Record Guide	3/5 stars

DownBeat reviewer Sam Freedman wrote, "Duet is a beautiful collection of meditations, captured as though in crystal by ECM’s technicians".

The AllMusic review by Scott Yanow stated: "This subtle set finds Burton and Corea consistently inspiring each other through melodic and very spontaneous improvising. Well worth a close listen".

== Track listing ==
All compositions by Chick Corea except where noted.

1. "Duet Suite" - 15:41
2. "Children's Song No. 15" - 1:15
3. "Children's Song No. 2" - 0:56
4. "Children's Song No. 5" - 1:14
5. "Children's Song No. 6" - 2:13
6. "Radio" (Steve Swallow) - 5:15
7. "Song to Gayle" - 7:13
8. "Never" (Swallow) - 7:37
9. "La Fiesta" - 10:17

== Personnel ==
- Gary Burton – vibraphone
- Chick Corea – piano

== Charts ==
Year	Chart	Position
1979	Billboard Jazz Albums	14
