= Crystal Silence =

Studio album by Gary Burton & Chick Corea
- Released: April 16, 1973
- Recorded: November 6, 1972
- Studio: Arne Bendiksen, Oslo, Norway
- Genre: Jazz
- Length: 44:23
- Label: ECM 1024 ST
- Producer: Manfred Eicher

Gary Burton & Chick Corea chronology
Crystal Silence (1973)	Duet (1979)

Gary Burton chronology
Alone at Last (1972)	Crystal Silence (1973)	The New Quartet (1973)

Chick Corea chronology
Light as a Feather (1973)	Crystal Silence (1973)	Hymn of the Seventh Galaxy (1973)

Professional ratings
Review scores
Source	Rating
AllMusic	4/5 stars
DownBeat	5/5 stars
Jazzwise	5/5 stars
The Penguin Guide to Jazz	3/4 stars
The Rolling Stone Jazz Record Guide	5/5 stars

Crystal Silence is an album by vibraphonist Gary Burton and pianist Chick Corea, recorded on November 6, 1972, and released on ECM the following year—the duo's debut.

== Track listing ==
All compositions by Chick Corea, except as noted.

1. "Señor Mouse" - 6:20
2. "Arise, Her Eyes" (Steve Swallow) - 5:08
3. "I'm Your Pal" (Swallow) - 4:02
4. "Desert Air" - 6:26
5. "Crystal Silence" - 9:05
6. "Falling Grace" (Swallow) - 2:42
7. "Feelings and Things" (Mike Gibbs) - 4:46
8. "Children's Song" - 2:11
9. "What Game Shall We Play Today" - 3:46

== Personnel ==
- Chick Corea – piano
- Gary Burton – vibraphone

== Chart performance ==
Year	Chart	Position
1974	Billboard Jazz Albums	24
