= Gayle Moran =

Jazz vocalist, keyboardist, and songwriter

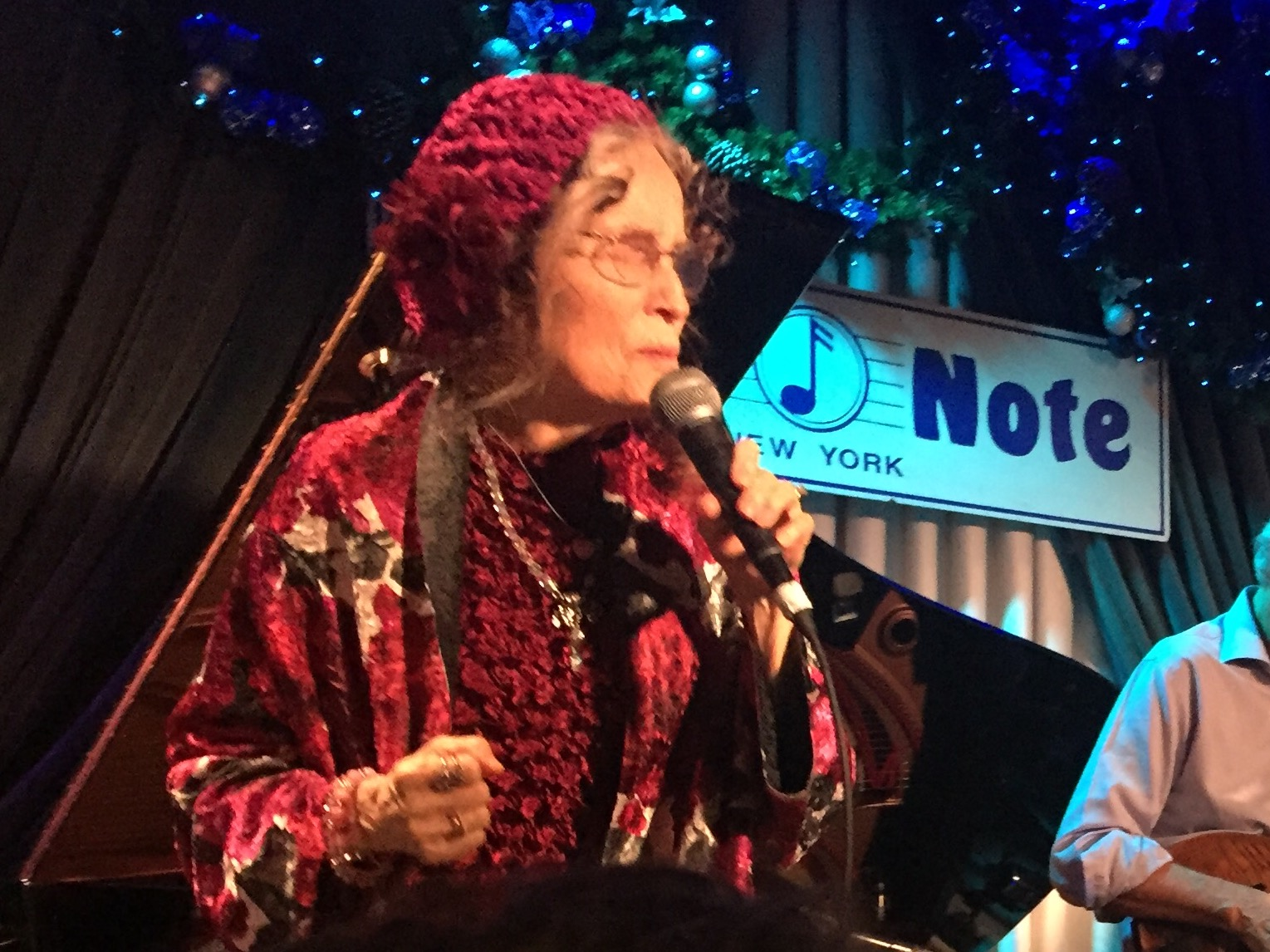
- Gayle Moran, Blue Note Jazz Club, New York City (10 December 2016)

Background information
- Born: 1943 (age 82–83)
- Genres: Jazz; Jazz fusion
- Occupations: Vocalist; Pianist; Keyboardist; Composer
- Instruments: Vocals, piano, keyboards, synthesizers, organ
- Years active: 1974–present
- Label: Columbia

Gayle Moran (born 1943) is an American vocalist, keyboardist, and songwriter. She is from Spring Arbor, Michigan and graduated from Spring Arbor High School (now Spring Arbor University) in 1961.

== Career ==
Moran was a member of the Mahavishnu Orchestra during the mid-1970s, appearing on Apocalypse (1974) and Visions of the Emerald Beyond (1975).

Moran later appeared on multiple recordings by her husband Chick Corea (whom she married in 1972): the Return to Forever albums Musicmagic (1977) and Live (1978); and the Chick Corea solo albums The Leprechaun (1975), My Spanish Heart (1976), Mad Hatter (1978), Secret Agent (1978), and Touchstone (1982).

Moran participated in the making of "Afterlife" from the soundtrack to the film War (2007) starring Jet Li and Jason Statham.

Other guest appearances included "The Gracious Core", on Mark Isham's album Castalia, and the title track from the David Sancious & Tone release Transformation (The Speed of Love) (1976).

Moran recorded one album under her own name, I Loved You Then ... I Love You Now (1979).

Moran appeared on Chick Corea's Antidote (2019) album, with The Spanish Heart Band and Rubén Blades.

== See also ==
- Chick Corea
