= Circle (American band) =

Avant garde jazz ensemble

Circle was an American avant garde jazz ensemble, active in 1970 and 1971. The group arose from pianist Chick Corea's early 1970s trio with Dave Holland on bass and Barry Altschul on drums and percussion with the addition of Anthony Braxton in a leading role on several reed instruments. The group's earliest (and only studio) recordings were made in 1970 for the Blue Note label but not released until 1975 under Corea's name. A live double album appeared on the ECM label in 1972. These recordings document a period in which Corea's work was steeped in the jazz 'avant garde,' prior to his complete shift to the jazz fusion orientation. Corea, Holland and Altschul also recorded the album, A.R.C. for ECM in 1971, but it was not released under the band name Circle.

== Discography ==
- Circle 1: Live in Germany Concert (CBS/Sony Japan, 1971) – recorded in 1970. Originally released under Circle's name, CD reissue released under Chick Corea's name
- Circle 2: Gathering (CBS/Sony Japan, 1971) – originally released under Circle's name, CD reissue released under Chick Corea's name.
- Paris-Concert (ECM, 1972) – recorded in 1971
- Circling In (Blue Note, 1975) – recorded in 1970. originally released under Chick Corea's name with additional tracks from Corea's earlier recordings. The Circle tracks were also released as Early Circle (1992).
- Circulus (Blue Note, 1978) – recorded in 1970. originally released under Chick Corea's name.
