= Chick Corea =

American musician and composer (1941–2021)

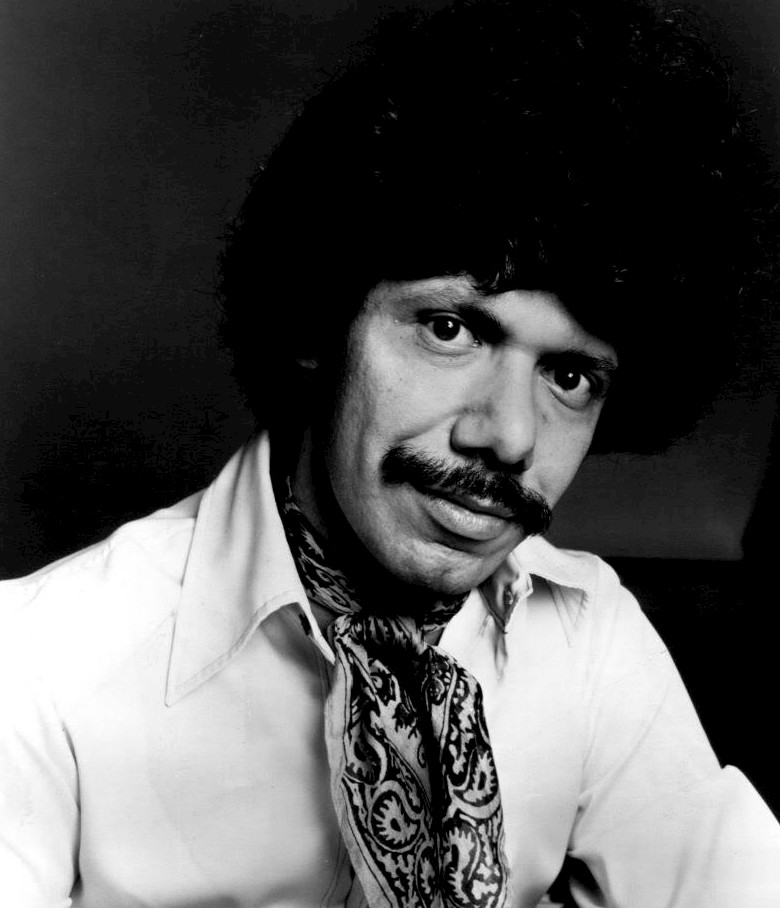
- Corea in 1976

Background information
- Born: Armando Anthony Corea; June 12, 1941; Chelsea, Massachusetts, U.S.
- Died: February 9, 2021 (aged 79) Tampa, Florida, U.S.
- Genres: Jazz; jazz fusion; post-bop; avant-garde jazz; Latin jazz; classical; progressive rock
- Occupations: Musician; composer; bandleader
- Instruments: Piano; keyboards; percussion; drums
- Years active: 1962–2021
- Labels: ECM; Polydor; Stretch; Warner Bros.
- Formerly of: Circle; Return to Forever; Chick Corea Elektric Band; Chick Corea's Akoustic Band; Five Peace Band
- Website: chickcorea.com

Armando Anthony "Chick" Corea (June 12, 1941 – February 9, 2021) was an American jazz pianist, composer, bandleader, and occasional percussionist. His compositions "Spain", "500 Miles High", "La Fiesta", "Armando's Rhumba", and "Windows" are considered jazz standards.

As a member of the Miles Davis band in the late 1960s, Corea participated in the birth of jazz fusion. In the 1970s he formed Return to Forever. Along with McCoy Tyner, Herbie Hancock and Keith Jarrett, Corea is considered one of the foremost pianists of the post-John Coltrane era.

Corea continued to collaborate frequently while exploring different musical styles throughout the 1980s and 1990s. He won 29 Grammy Awards and has been nominated for the award 79 times.

== Early life and education ==
Armando Corea was born in Chelsea, Massachusetts, to parents Anna (née Zaccone) and Armando J. Corea. His father's family was from Albi, a commune in the Province of Catanzaro in the Calabria region of Italy. His father, a trumpeter who led a Dixieland band in Boston in the 1930s and 1940s, introduced him to the piano at the age of four. Surrounded by jazz, he was influenced at an early age by bebop and musicians such as Dizzy Gillespie, Charlie Parker, Bud Powell, Horace Silver, and Lester Young. He came into possession of a drumset at age 11, and would occasionally play drums for the rest of his career.

Corea developed his piano skills while exploring music on his own. At first, his father taught him piano, but eventually, the elder Corea thought it proper that his son receive instruction from a professional teacher. At the age of eight, he began taking formal lessons with Italian concert pianist Salvatore Sullo. Sullo was indifferent to the young Corea's passion for jazz, instead teaching him to play classical piano, but being introduced to classical music helped spark Corea's interest in musical composition.

Given a black tuxedo by his father, he started playing gigs while still in high school. He enjoyed listening to Herb Pomeroy's band at the time and had a trio that played Horace Silver's music at a local jazz club. He eventually moved to New York City, where he studied music at Columbia University, then transferred to the Juilliard School. He later dropped out so he could spend more time playing gigs.

== Career ==
Corea began his professional recording and touring career in the early 1960s with Mongo Santamaria, Willie Bobo, Blue Mitchell, Herbie Mann, and Stan Getz. In 1966, he recorded his debut album, Tones for Joan's Bones. In March 1968, he recorded the highly regarded trio album, Now He Sings, Now He Sobs, with drummer Roy Haynes and bassist Miroslav Vitouš.

In the fall of 1968, Corea began recording and touring with Miles Davis, appearing on the widely praised Davis studio albums Filles de Kilimanjaro, In a Silent Way, Bitches Brew, and On the Corner. He also appeared on later compilation albums Big Fun, Water Babies, and Circle in the Round. He left Davis' band shortly after its performance at the 1970 Isle of Wight Festival.

Bassist Dave Holland departed the Davis group with Corea to form their own group, Circle, with multireedist Anthony Braxton and drummer Barry Altschul. They were active from 1970 to 1971, and recorded on Blue Note and ECM. In 1971, Corea, at the behest of ECM producer Manfred Eicher, began playing solo piano, recording the sessions that became Piano Improvisations Vol. 1 and Piano Improvisations Vol. 2 in April of that year. In 1974, Corea collaborated with Richie Grasso on the latter's album Season of Grace, produced by Morris Levy's Tiger Lily Records.

=== Jazz fusion ===
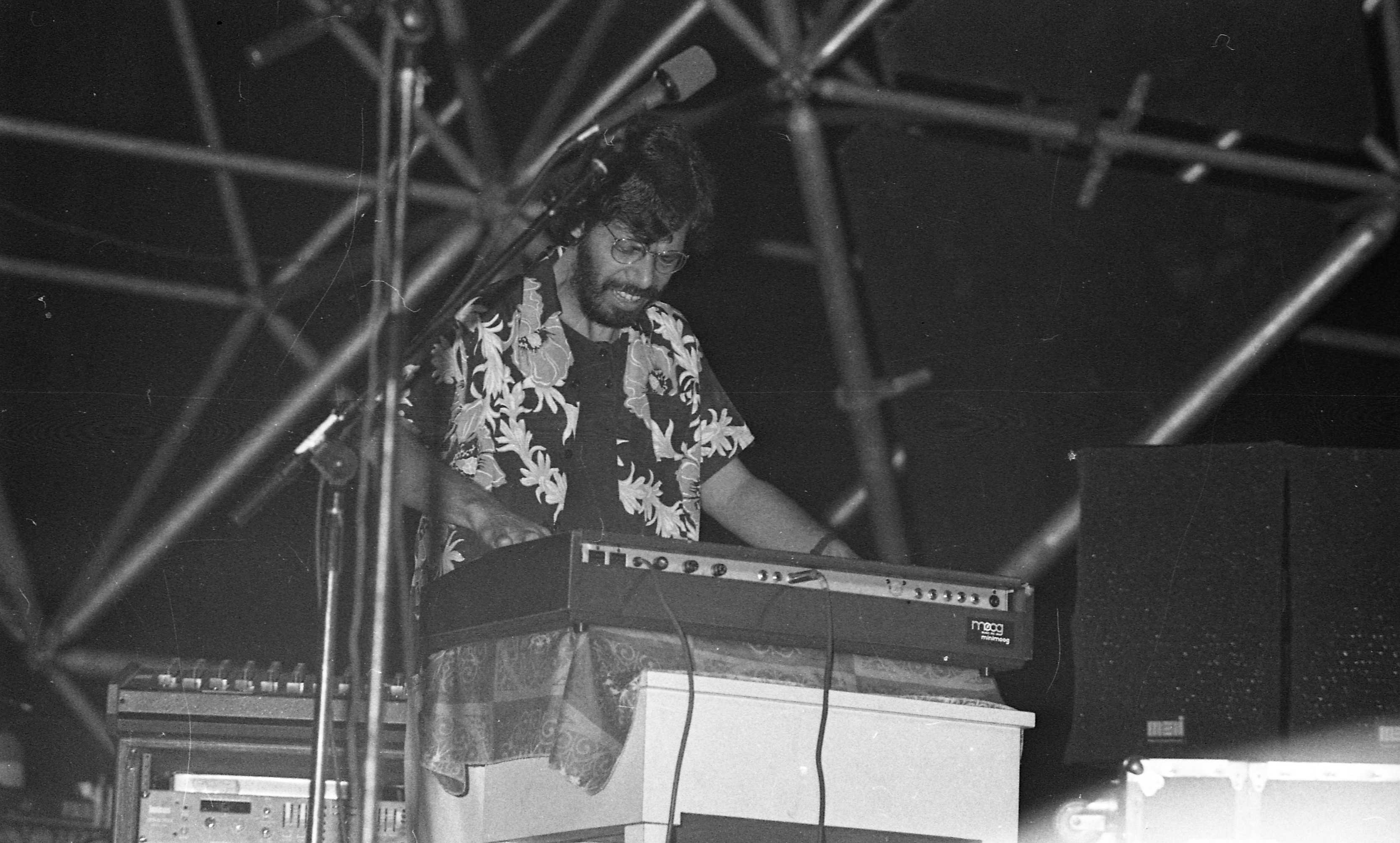
Corea during a performance at Sultan's Pool in Jerusalem, 1981

Named after their eponymous 1972 album, Corea's Return to Forever band combined acoustic and electronic instrumentation, and initially drew upon Hispanic music styles more than rock music. On their first two records, the group consisted of Flora Purim on vocals and percussion, Joe Farrell on flute and soprano saxophone, Miles Davis bandmate Airto on drums and percussion, and Stanley Clarke on acoustic double bass. Drummer Lenny White and guitarist Bill Connors later joined Corea and Clarke to form the second version of the group, which blended the earlier Latin music elements with rock and funk-oriented music. This incarnation of the band recorded the album Hymn of the Seventh Galaxy, before Connors' replacement by Al Di Meola, who later played on Where Have I Known You Before, No Mystery and Romantic Warrior.

In 1976, Corea released My Spanish Heart, influenced by Hispanic music and featuring vocalist Gayle Moran (Corea's wife) and violinist Jean-Luc Ponty. The album combined jazz and flamenco, supported by Minimoog synthesizer and a horn section. He collaborated with flamenco guitarist Paco De Lucía years later on the Touchstone and Zyryab albums.

=== Duet projects ===
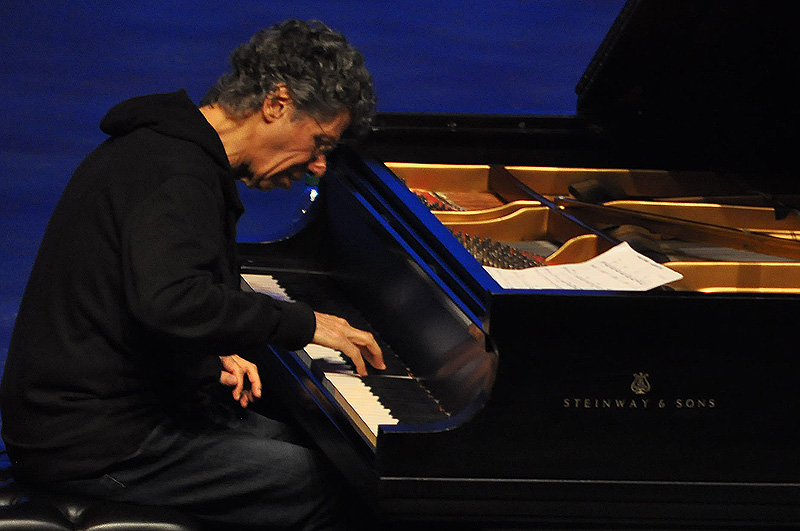
Corea at a dual-Gary Burton concert in London, April 2012

In the 1970s, Corea started working with vibraphonist Gary Burton, with whom he recorded several duet albums for ECM, including 1972's Crystal Silence. They reunited in 2006 for a concert tour. A new record called The New Crystal Silence was issued in 2008 and won a Grammy Award in 2009. The package includes a disc of duets and another disc with the Sydney Symphony Orchestra.

Towards the end of the 1970s, Corea embarked on a series of concerts with fellow pianist Herbie Hancock. These concerts were presented in elegant settings with both artists dressed formally and performing on concert grand pianos. The two played each other's compositions, as well as pieces by other composers such as Béla Bartók, and duets. In 1982, Corea performed The Meeting, a live duet with the classical pianist Friedrich Gulda.

In December 2007, Corea recorded a duet album, The Enchantment, with banjoist Béla Fleck. Fleck and Corea toured extensively for the album in 2007. Fleck was nominated in the Best Instrumental Composition category at the 49th Grammy Awards for the track "Spectacle".

In 2008, Corea collaborated with Japanese pianist Hiromi Uehara on the live album Duet (Chick Corea and Hiromi). The duo played a concert at Tokyo's Budokan arena on April 30.

In 2015, Corea reprised the duet concert series with Hancock, again sticking to a dueling-piano format, though both now integrated synthesizers into their repertoire. The first concert in this series was at the Paramount Theatre in Seattle and included improvisations, compositions by the duo, and standards by other composers.

=== Later work ===
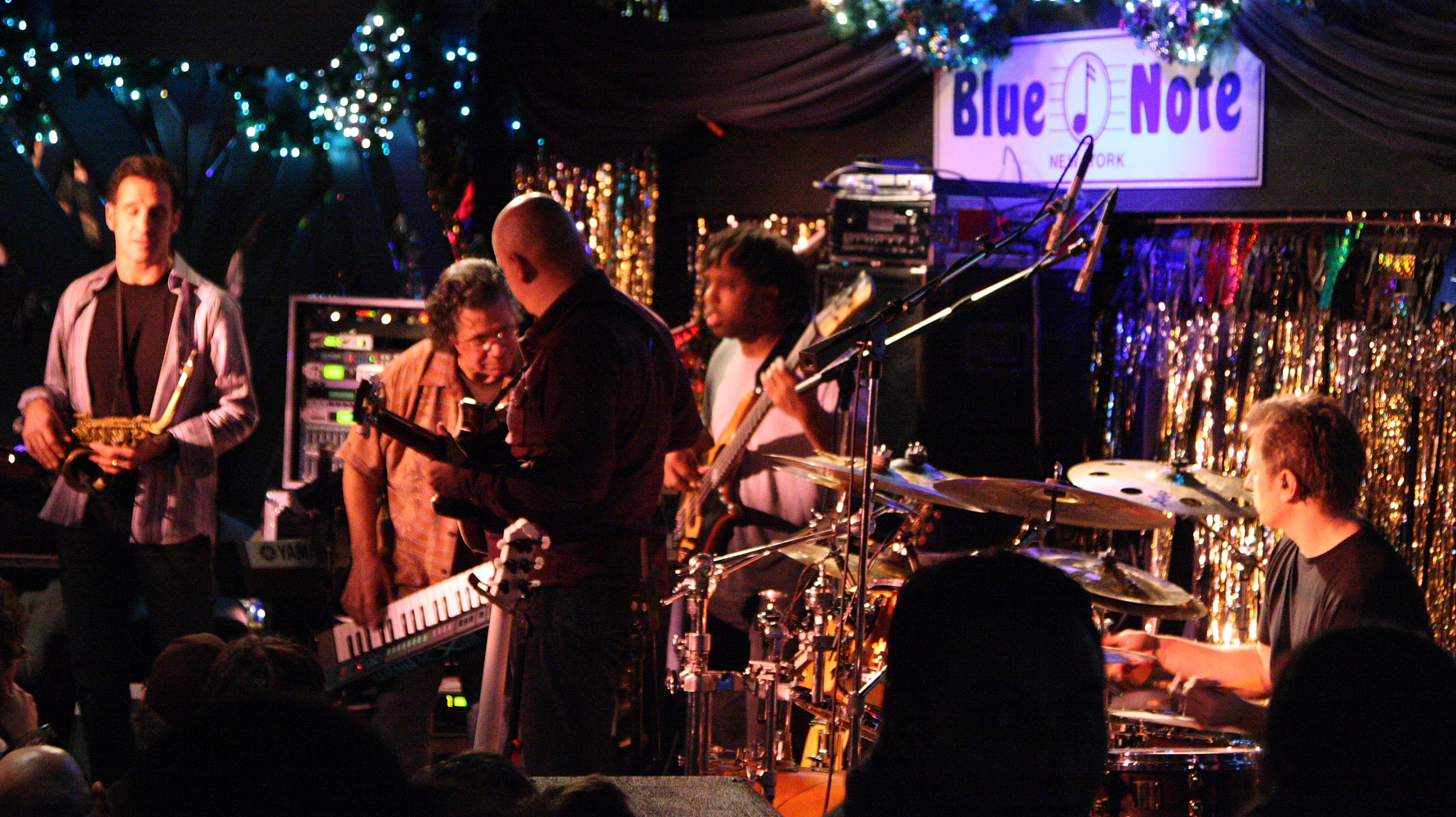
The Chick Corea Elektric Band at the Blue Note in New York City, 2007

Corea's other bands included the Chick Corea Elektric Band, its trio reduction called "Akoustic Band", Origin, and its trio reduction called the New Trio. Corea signed a record deal with GRP Records in 1986 which led to the release of ten albums between 1986 and 1994, seven with the Elektric Band, two with the Akoustic Band, and a solo album, Expressions.

The Akoustic Band released a self-titled album in 1989 and a live follow-up, Alive, in 1991, both featuring John Patitucci on bass and Dave Weckl on drums. It marked a return to traditional jazz trio instrumentation in Corea's career, and the bulk of his subsequent recordings have featured acoustic piano.

In 1992, Corea started his own label, Stretch Records.

In 2001, the Chick Corea New Trio, with bassist Avishai Cohen and drummer Jeff Ballard, released the album Past, Present & Futures. The eleven-song album includes only one standard (Fats Waller's "Jitterbug Waltz"). The rest of the tunes are Corea originals. He participated in 1998's Like Minds with old associates Gary Burton on vibraphone, Dave Holland on bass, Roy Haynes on drums, and Pat Metheny playing guitars.

During the later part of his career, Corea also explored contemporary classical music. He composed his first piano concerto—an adaptation of his signature piece "Spain" for a full symphony orchestra—and performed it in 1999 with the London Philharmonic Orchestra. In 2004, he composed his first work without keyboards: his String Quartet No. 1 was written for the Orion String Quartet and performed by them at 2004's Summerfest in Wisconsin.

Corea continued recording fusion albums such as To the Stars (2004) and The Ultimate Adventure (2006). The latter won the Grammy Award for Best Jazz Instrumental Album, Individual or Group for 2007.

In 2008, the third version of Return to Forever (Corea, Stanley Clarke, Lenny White, and Di Meola) reunited for a worldwide tour. The reunion received positive reviews from jazz and mainstream publications. Most of the group's studio recordings were re-released on the compilation Return to Forever: The Anthology to coincide with the tour. A concert DVD recorded during their performance at the Montreux Jazz Festival was released in May 2009. He also worked on a collaboration CD with the vocal group The Manhattan Transfer.

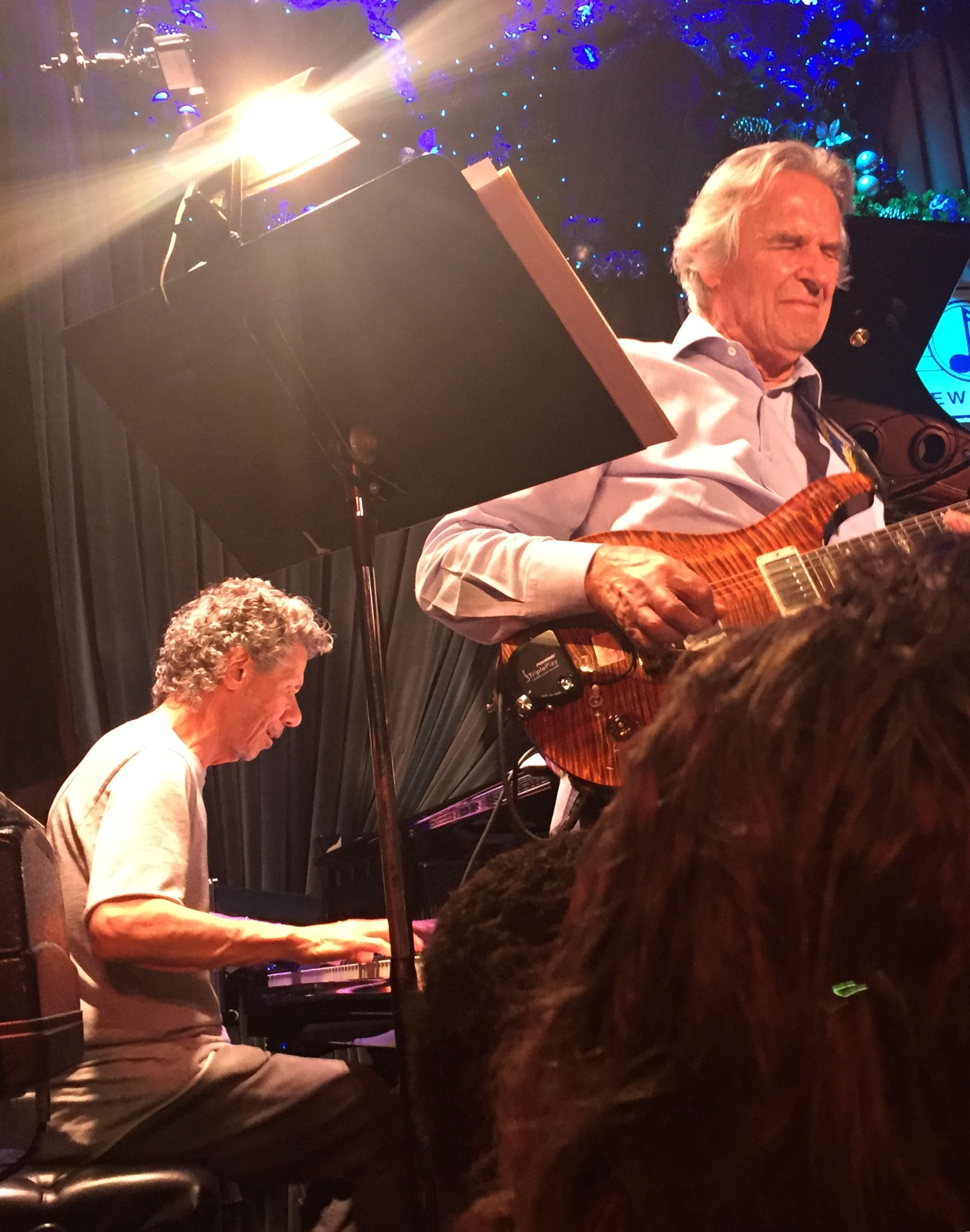
Corea with John McLaughlin at the NYC Blue Note, 2016

A new group, the Five Peace Band, began a world tour in October 2008. The ensemble included John McLaughlin, whom Corea had previously worked with in Miles Davis's late 1960s bands, including the group that recorded Davis's classic album Bitches Brew. Joining Corea and McLaughlin were saxophonist Kenny Garrett and bassist Christian McBride. Drummer Vinnie Colaiuta played with the band in Europe and on select North American dates; Brian Blade played all dates in Asia and Australia, and most dates in North America. The vast reach of Corea's music was celebrated in a 2011 retrospective with Corea guesting with the Jazz at Lincoln Center Orchestra in the Lincoln Center for the Performing Arts; a New York Times reviewer had high praise for the occasion: "Mr. Corea was masterly with the other musicians, absorbing the rhythm and feeding the soloists. It sounded like a band, and Mr. Corea had no need to dominate; his authority was clear without raising volume."

A new band, Chick Corea & The Vigil, featured Corea with bassist Hadrien Feraud, Marcus Gilmore on drums (carrying on from his grandfather, Roy Haynes), saxes, flute, and bass clarinet from Origin vet Tim Garland, and guitarist Charles Altura.

Corea celebrated his 75th birthday in 2016 by playing with more than 20 different groups during a six-week stand at the Blue Note Jazz Club in Greenwich Village, New York City. "I pretty well ignore the numbers that make up 'age'. It seems to be the best way to go. I have always just concentrated on having the most fun I can with the adventure of music."

== Personal life ==
Corea and his first wife Joanie had two children; the marriage ended in divorce. In 1972, Corea married his second wife, vocalist/pianist Gayle Moran.

In 1968, Corea read Dianetics, author L. Ron Hubbard's well-known self-help book, and developed an interest in Hubbard's other works in the early 1970s: "I came into contact with L. Ron Hubbard's material in 1968 with Dianetics and it kind of opened my mind up and it got me into seeing that my potential for communication was a lot greater than I thought it was."

Corea said that Scientology became a profound influence on his musical direction in the early 1970s: "I no longer wanted to satisfy myself. I really want to connect with the world and make my music mean something to people." With Clarke Corea played on Space Jazz: The soundtrack of the book Battlefield Earth, a 1982 album to accompany L. Ron Hubbard's novel Battlefield Earth.

Corea was excluded from a concert during the 1993 World Championships in Athletics in Stuttgart, Germany. The concert's organizers excluded him after the state government of Baden-Württemberg had announced it would review its subsidies for events featuring avowed members of Scientology. After Corea's complaint against this policy before the administrative court was unsuccessful in 1996, members of the United States Congress, in a letter to the German government, denounced the ban as a violation of Corea's human rights. Corea was not banned from performing in Germany, however, and had several appearances at the government-supported International Jazz Festival in Burghausen; he was awarded a plaque on Burghausen's "Street of Fame" in 2011.

Corea died at his home in Tampa, Florida, on February 9, 2021, shortly after being diagnosed with a rare form of cancer. He was 79.

== Awards and honors ==
In 1997, Corea was awarded an Honorary Doctorate of Music from Berklee College of Music. In 1999, Corea's album Now He Sings, Now He Sobs (1968) was inducted into the Grammy Hall of Fame. In 2010, Corea was named Doctor Honoris Causa at the Norwegian University of Science and Technology (NTNU).

=== Grammy Awards ===
As of February 2026, Corea had won 29 Grammy Awards, having been nominated a total of 79 times for the award.

Year	Category	Album or song
1976	Best Jazz Performance by a Group	No Mystery (with Return to Forever)
1977	Best Instrumental Arrangement	"Leprechaun's Dream"
1977	Best Jazz Instrumental Performance, Group	The Leprechaun
1979	Best Jazz Instrumental Performance, Group	Friends
1980	Best Jazz Instrumental Performance, Group	Duet (with Gary Burton)
1982	Best Jazz Instrumental Performance, Group	In Concert, Zürich, October 28, 1979 (with Gary Burton)
1989	Best R&B Instrumental Performance	"Light Years"
1990	Best Jazz Instrumental Performance, Group	Chick Corea Akoustic Band
1999	Best Jazz Instrumental Solo	"Rhumbata" with Gary Burton
2000	Best Jazz Instrumental Performance, Group	Like Minds
2001	Best Instrumental Arrangement	"Spain for Sextet & Orchestra"
2004	Best Jazz Instrumental Solo	"Matrix"
2007	Best Jazz Instrumental Performance, Group	The Ultimate Adventure
2007	Best Instrumental Arrangement	"Three Ghouls"
2008	Best Jazz Instrumental Performance, Group	The New Crystal Silence (with Gary Burton)
2010	Best Jazz Instrumental Performance, Group	Five Peace Band Live
2012	Best Improvised Jazz Solo	"500 Miles High"
2012	Best Jazz Instrumental Album	Forever
2013	Best Improvised Jazz Solo	"Hot House"
2013	Best Instrumental Composition	"Mozart Goes Dancing"
2015	Best Improvised Jazz Solo	"Fingerprints"
2015	Best Jazz Instrumental Album	Trilogy
2020	Best Latin Jazz Album	Antidote (with The Spanish Heart Band)
2021	Best Jazz Instrumental Album	Trilogy 2 (with Christian McBride and Brian Blade)
2021	Best Improvised Jazz Solo	"All Blues"
2022	Best Improvised Jazz Solo	"Humpty Dumpty (Set 2)"
2022	Best Latin Jazz Album	Mirror Mirror
2026	Best Jazz Performance	"Windows — Live" (with Christian McBride and Brian Blade)

=== Latin Grammy Awards ===
Year	Award	Album/song
2007	Best Instrumental Album	The Enchantment (with Béla Fleck)
2011	Best Instrumental Album	Forever (with Stanley Clarke and Lenny White)

== See also ==
- 500 Miles High
- Spain
- Windows
