= List of works by Stanley Clarke =

This is a list of works by American jazz musician Stanley Clarke, including a discography and filmography.

== Discography ==
=== As leader ===
Albums

Year	Title	Peak chart positions				Label
Year	Title	US	US R&B	US Jazz	UK	Label
1973	Children of Forever	―	―	39	―	Polydor
1974	Stanley Clarke	59	―	4	―	Nemperor
1975	Journey to Love	34	8	3	―	Nemperor
1976	School Days	34	―	2	―	Nemperor
1978	Modern Man	57	25	4	―	Nemperor
1979	I Wanna Play for You	62	36	5	―	Nemperor
1980	Rocks, Pebbles and Sand	95	40	5	42	Epic
1982	Let Me Know You	114	25	7	―	Epic
1984	Time Exposure	149	52	10	―	Epic
1985	Find Out! (as the Stanley Clarke Band)	―	―	―	―	Epic
1986	Hideaway	—	―	15	―	Epic
1988	If This Bass Could Only Talk	―	―	2	―	Epic
1991	Live 1976–1977	―	―	―	―	Epic
1992	Passenger 57	―	―	―	―	Epic
1993	East River Drive	―	54	4	―	Epic
1994	Live at the Greek	―	―	10	―	Epic
1995	At the Movies	—	―	―	―	Epic
1997	The Bass-ic Collection	—	―	―	―	Sony
2003	1, 2, to the Bass	—	―	6	―	Sony
2006	Standards	―	―	―	―	Kind of Blue
2007	The Toys of Men	—	—	2	―	Heads Up
2010	The Stanley Clarke Band (as the Stanley Clarke Band, with Hiromi, Ruslan, Ronald Bruner, Jr.)	—	—	7	—	Heads Up
2014	Up (as the Stanley Clarke Band)	―	―	―	―	Mack Avenue
2018	The Message (as the Stanley Clarke Band)	―	―	―	―	Mack Avenue
"—" denotes releases that did not chart or were not released in that territory.

Singles

Year	Title	Peak chart positions	
Year	Title	US Pop	US R&B
1974	"Vulcan Princess"	―	―
1976	"Silly Putty"	―	94
1976	"Hot Fun"	―	―
1978	"Slow Dance"	―	76
1978	"Rock 'n' Roll Jelly"	―	―
1979	"Just a Feeling"	―	―
1979	"Together Again"	―	―
1980	"We Supply"	―	43
1981	"I Just Want To Love You" (with George Duke)	―	49
1981	"Sweet Baby" (with George Duke)	19	6
1982	"Straight to the Top"	―	81
1982	"The Force of Love"	―	―
1982	"You Are the One for Me"	―	―
1983	"Heroes" (with George Duke)	―	37
1984	"Are You Ready?"	―	―
1984	"Heaven Sent You"	―	―
1984	"Future"	―	―
1985	"What If I Should Fall in Love" (as the Stanley Clarke Band)	―	―
1985	"Born in the U.S.A." (as the Stanley Clarke Band)	―	52
1986	"I'm Here to Stay" (with Larry Graham)	―	―
1986	"Listen to the Beat of Your Heart" (with Bernard Jackson)	―	―
1988	"Funny How Time Flies (When You're Having Fun)"	―	―
1990	"Lady" (with George Duke)	―	67
1993	"Justice's Groove"	―	―
1993	"East River Drive"	―	―
1997	"Between Love & Magic"	―	―
"—" denotes releases that did not chart.

=== As co-leader/band member ===
With Animal Logic

- Animal Logic (I.R.S., 1989)
- Animal Logic II (I.R.S, 1991)

With George Duke

- The Clarke/Duke Project (Epic, 1981)
- The Clarke/Duke Project II (Epic, 1983)
- 3 (Epic, 1990)
- Live in Montreux 1988 (Jazz Door, 1993)

With Fuse One

- Fuse One (CTI, 1980)
- Silk (CTI, 1981)

With Hiromi and Lenny White (As The Stanley Clarke Trio)

- Jazz in the Garden (Heads Up, 2009)

With The Manhattan Project

- The Manhattan Project (Blue Note, 1989)

With The New Barbarians

- Buried Alive: Live in Maryland (Wooden, 2006)

With Jean-Luc Ponty/Al Di Meola

- The Rite of Strings (Gai Saber, 1995)

With Jean-Luc Ponty/Biréli Lagrène

- D-Stringz (Impulse!, 2015)

With Return to Forever

- Return to Forever (ECM, 1972)
- Light as a Feather (Polydor, 1972)
- Hymn of the Seventh Galaxy (Polydor, 1973)
- Where Have I Known You Before (Polydor, 1974)
- No Mystery (Polydor, 1975)
- Romantic Warrior (Columbia, 1976)
- Musicmagic (Columbia, 1977)
- Return to Forever, Live (Columbia, 1978)
- The Griffith Park Band Live
- The Griffith Park Collection (1982)
- Returns (Eagle, 2009)
- Forever [as Corea, Clarke & White] (Concord, 2011)
- The Mothership Returns (Eagle, 2012)

With Stanley Clarke & Friends

- Live at the Greek (Epic, 1994)

With SMV

- Thunder (Heads Up, 2008)

With Vertú

- Vertú (Epic, 1999)

=== As sideman ===
With Gato Barbieri

- 1971 Under Fire (Flying Dutchman)
- 1973 Bolivia (Flying Dutchman)
- 1975 El Gato (Flying Dutchman)

With Luiz Bonfá

- 1973 Jacarandá
- 1974 Todo o Nada
- 1991 Grandes Compositores

With Chick Corea

- 1974 Live in New York
- 1976 My Spanish Heart
- 1980 Tap Step
- 1982 Touchstone
- 2017 The Musician [compilation]

With Norman Connors

- 1972 Dance of Magic
- 1973 Dark of Light
- 1993 Remember Who You Are

With Deodato

- 1972 Prelude
- 1973 Deodato 2
- 1975 Deodato Max 20
- 1983 Super Fusion 1900
- 1984 Deodato
- 2000 Odisea del Espacio
- 2001 Preludes & Rhapsodies
- 2004 Trios
- 2005 Beginning
- 2006 Todos Sus Grandes Exitos

With George Duke

- 1977 From Me to You
- 1977 Reach for It
- 1984 Rendezvous
- 1993 Muir Woods Suite (rel. 1996, live)

With Joe Farrell

- 1972 Moon Germs
- 1978 La Cathedral Y El Toro

With Mike Garson

- 1986 Serendipity
- 1989 Remember Love
- 1991 Admiration

With Stan Getz

- 1974 Captain Marvel
- 1977 At Montreux (rec. 1972)
- 1979 Children of the World
- 1988 The Lyrical Stan Getz
- 2008 Complete Live at Montreux 1972 (rec. 1972 & 1974)

With Dexter Gordon

- 1972 Tangerine
- 1972 Ca'Purange
- 1996 Blue Dex: Dexter Gordon Plays the Blues [compilation]
- 1998 The Art of the Ballad [compilation]

With Howard Hewett

- 1994 It's Time
- 2007 If Only...

With George Howard

- 1986 A Nice Place to Be
- 1988 Reflections
- 1992 Do I Ever Cross Your Mind?
- 1993 When Summer Comes

With Freddie Hubbard

- 1979 The Love Connection
- 1981 Mistral
- 1989 Times Are Changing

With Bobby Lyle

- 1985 Night Breeze
- 1994 Rhythm Stories

With Teena Marie

- 1983 Robbery
- 1986 Emerald City

With Paul McCartney

- 1982 Tug of War
- 1983 Pipes of Peace

With John McLaughlin

- 1979 Electric Guitarist
- 2004 Guitar & Bass [compilation]

With Airto Moreira

- 1972 Free
- 1974 Virgin Land
- 1989 Struck by Lightning
- 1993 Killer Bees
- 2000 Revenge of the Killer Bees

With Alphonse Mouzon

- 1984 Distant Lover
- 1985 Back to Jazz (as The Alphonse Mouzon Band)

With Sunnie Paxson

- 2002 Groove Suite
- 2011 Bohemian Sun

With Dianne Reeves

- 1987 Dianne Reeves
- 1990 Never Too Far

With Pharoah Sanders

- 1971 Black Unity (Impulse)
- 1972 Live at the East (Impulse!)
- 1973 Village of the Pharoahs (Impulse!)

With McCoy Tyner

- 1979 Together
- 1982 Looking Out
- 2000 McCoy Tyner with Stanley Clarke and Al Foster
- 2007 Afro Blue [compilation]

With Lenny White

- 1995 Present Tense
- 1996 Renderers of Spirit
- 2010 Anomaly

With Tony Williams

- 1978 The Joy of Flying
- 1996 Wilderness (Live 1995)

With others

- 1971 In Pursuit of Blackness, Joe Henderson
- 1972 For Those Who Chant, Luis Gasca (with the Santana band)
- 1972 Blues and the Soulful Truth, Leon Thomas
- 1972 Dom Um Romão, Dom Um Romão
- 1972 The Loud Minority, Frank Foster
- 1973 Crankin', Curtis Fuller
- 1973 Gypsy Man, Robin Kenyatta
- 1973 Illusion Suite, Stanley Cowell
- 1973 Butterfly Dreams, Flora Purim
- 1973 Child's Dance: Art Blakey & the Jazz Messengers Vol. 1, Art Blakey
- 1973 Extension of a Man, Donny Hathaway
- 1974 Borboletta, Santana
- 1974 The Chicago Theme, Hubert Laws
- 1974 In the Cut, Ray Bryant
- 1974 Let Me in Your Life, Aretha Franklin
- 1974 Two Is One, Charlie Rouse
- 1976 Black Rose, JD Souther
- 1976 I Heard That!!, Quincy Jones
- 1976 Ports of the Heart, Jimmie Spheeris
- 1976 Land of the Midnight Sun, Al Di Meola
- 1977 Killer Joe, Benny Golson
- 1977 Loading Zone, Roy Buchanan
- 1977 Sweet Bird, Lani Hall
- 1977 Just Family, Dee Dee Bridgewater
- 1979 I Loved You Then... I Love You Now, Gayle Moran
- 1979 Troublemaker, Ian McLagan
- 1980 Love at First Sight, Sonny Rollins
- 1981 Galaxian, The Jeff Lorber Fusion
- 1982 Echoes of an Era, with Chaka Khan, Joe Henderson, Freddie Hubbard, Chick Corea & Lenny White
- 1982 Hollywood, Maynard Ferguson
- 1983 Spanish Wave, L. Subramaniam
- 1983 The Look, Shalamar
- 1984 In the Dark, Roy Ayers
- 1984 Marathon, Rodney Franklin
- 1984 The Big Jazz Trio, George Cables
- 1984 The Two of Us, Ramsey Lewis & Nancy Wilson
- 1985 Anywhere You Go, David Pack
- 1985 Put Sunshine in It, Arthur Blythe
- 1986 Illusions, Eliane Elias
- 1986 Blue Notes, Helen Terry
- 1986 Word Up!, Cameo
- 1987 A Sound Investment, Flip Phillips/Scott Hamilton
- 1987 Shieldstone, Stanley Clarke & Bill Shields
- 1987 All Systems Go, Donna Summer
- 1988 Every Step of the Way, David Benoit
- 1988 Diamond Inside of You, Rodney Franklin
- 1988 Heart's Horizon, Al Jarreau
- 1989 Alligator, Leslie West
- 1990 First Instrument, Rachelle Ferrell [rel. 1995, re-issue of Somethin' Else (1990)]
- 1991 The Comfort Zone, Vanessa Williams
- 1992 Precious, Chanté Moore
- 1993 Love's Alright, Eddie Murphy
- 1994 Smooth, Gerald Albright
- 1995 Giving Myself to You, Gerald Albright
- 1994 Freudian Slip, Deborah Holland
- 1995 Dance of Fire, Aziza Mustafa Zadeh
- 1995 Songs from the Key of Life: A Tribute to Stevie Wonder, Najee
- 1996 Inner City Blues, Doc Powell
- 1996 Laid Back, Doc Powell
- 1996 Leopard Son, Stewart Copeland
- 1998 Gershwin's World, Herbie Hancock
- 1998 Walk Tall: Tribute to Cannonball Adderley, Eric Marienthal
- 1998 World According to M.T., Michael Thompson
- 2003 In Between the Heartaches, Phyllis Hyman
- 2003 Timeless Eliane Elias, Eliane Elias [compilation]
- 2004 A Man and His Music, Claus Ogerman [2CD compilation]
- 2004 The Trip, Tom Middleton
- 2005 Master of All Trades, Marcus Miller [2DVD video]
- 2006 Givin' It Up, George Benson/Al Jarreau
- 2009 The Playmaker, Mads Tolling
- 2011 Ruslan, Ruslan Sirota
- 2011 Somos, Kennard Ramsey
- 2011 Swing Shift, Doug Webb
- 2012 Fusion Best, Ithamara Koorax
- 2012 Rhythm Sessions, Lee Ritenour
- 2013 Ritzville, Allen Vizzutti
- 2014 Morning Phase, Beck
- 2017 Elaborations (1982) / Light Blue: Arthur Blythe Plays Thelonious Monk (1983) / Put Sunshine In It (1985), Arthur Blythe [reissue of three albums]
- 2017 World Wide Funk, Bootsy Collins

=== As producer ===
- 1978 Just Family, Dee Dee Bridgewater
- 1982 Hollywood, Maynard Ferguson
- 1983 I'm Ready, Natalie Cole
- 1983 The Look, Shalamar
- 1984 Beyond the Clouds, Free Flight
- 1984 In the Dark, Roy Ayers
- 1984 Marathon, Rodney Franklin
- 1984 The Two of Us, Ramsey Lewis & Nancy Wilson
- 1984 No Question About It, Kent Jordan
- 1986 I Commit to Love, Howard Hewitt
- 1988 Diamond Inside of You, Rodney Franklin
- 1988 Get Here, Brenda Russell
- 1990 Private Flight, Jim Walker

== Filmography ==
=== Feature films ===
Year	Title	Director(s)	Studio(s)	Notes
1990	The Book of Love	Robert Shaye	New Line Cinema	
1991	The Five Heartbeats	Robert Townsend	20th Century Fox	
1991	Boyz n the Hood	John Singleton	Columbia Pictures	
1991	Cool as Ice	David Kellogg	Alive Films	
1992	Passenger 57	Kevin Hooks	Warner Bros.	
1993	Watch It	Tom Flynn	Skouras Pictures	
1993	What's Love Got to Do with It	Brian Gibson	Touchstone Pictures	
1993	Poetic Justice	John Singleton	Columbia Pictures	
1994	Little Big League	Andrew Scheinman	Castle Rock Entertainment	
1995	Higher Learning	John Singleton	Columbia Pictures	
1995	Panther	Mario Van Peebles	PolyGram Filmed Entertainment	
1995	The Show	Brian Robbins	Savoy Pictures	
1995	Bleeding Hearts	Gregory Hines	Savoy Pictures	
1996	Eddie	Steve Rash	Hollywood Pictures	
1996	The Cherokee Kid	Paris Barclay	HBO Films	
1997	Dangerous Ground	Darrell Roodt	New Line Cinema	
1997	B*A*P*S	Robert Townsend	New Line Cinema	
1997	Sprung	Rusty Cundieff	Trimark Pictures	
1998	Down in the Delta	Maya Angelou	Miramax	
1999	The Best Man	Malcolm D. Lee	Universal Pictures	
2000	Romeo Must Die	Andrzej Bartkowiak	Warner Bros.	
2002	Undercover Brother	Malcolm D. Lee	Universal Pictures	
2002	Undisputed	Walter Hill	Miramax	
2002	The Transporter	Louis Leterrier; Corey Yuen	EuropaCorp	
2005	Into the Sun	Christopher Morrison	Destination Films	Direct-to-video film
2005	Roll Bounce	Malcolm D. Lee	Fox Searchlight Pictures	
2006	Like Mike 2: Streetball	David Nelson	20th Century Fox Home Entertainment	Direct-to-video film
2008	First Sunday	David E. Talbert	Screen Gems	
2008	Soul Men	Malcolm D. Lee	Dimension Films	
2013	The Best Man Holiday	Malcolm D. Lee	Universal Pictures	
2016	Barbershop: The Next Cut	Malcolm D. Lee	Metro-Goldwyn-Mayer	

| freelancers || Walter Hill || Miramax

=== Television ===
Year	TV program	Director
2007-2009	Lincoln Heights	Various
2000–2004	Soul Food	Felicia D. Henderson
1990	Tales from the Crypt	Jack Sholder, Joel Silver
1990	Hull High	Gil Grant, Bruce Bilson, Kenny Ortega, Steven Robman
1989	A Man Called Hawk	Mario DiLeo, Bill Duke, Harry Falk, Winrich Kolbe, Stan Lathan, Sigmund Neufeld Jr, Virgil W. Vogel
1988–1989	Knightwatch	Sharron Miller, Kevin Rodney Sullivan
1986	Pee Wee's Playhouse	Bill Freiberger, Steven Johnson, Guy J. Louthan, William T. Orr, Paul Reubens

=== Television movies ===
Year	TV movie	Director
2003	Murder, She Wrote: The Celtic Riddle	Anthony Pullen Shaw
2002	The Big Time	Paris Barclay
2002	Little John	Dick Lowry
2002	The Red Sneakers	Gregory Hines
2001	Murder, She Wrote: The Last Free Man	Anthony Pullen Shaw
2000	The Color of Friendship	Kevin Hooks
2000	The Loretta Claiborne Story	Lee Grant
1999	Rocky Marciano	Charles Winkler
1999	Funny Valentines	Julie Dash
1999	If You Believe	Alan Metzger
1998	Love Kills	Brian Grant
1998	On the Line	Elodie Keene
1996	Road to Galveston	Michael Toshiyuki Uno
1996	The Cherokee Kid	Paris Barclay
1994	Royce	Rob Holcomb
1993	Relentless: Mind of a Killer	John Patterson
1993	Boy Meets Girl	Kevin Rodney Sullivan
1992	Final Shot: The Hank Gathers Story	Charles Braverman
1991	Prison Stories: Women on the Inside	Donna Deitch, Joan Micklin Silver, Penelope Spheeris
1990	The Kid Who Loved Christmas	Arthur Allan Seidelman
1990	The Court-Martial of Jackie Robinson	Larry Peerce
1990	Blue Bayou	Karen Arthur
1990	Dangerous Pursuit	Sandor Stern
1990	Tales from the Whoop	Whoopi Goldberg
1989	Out on the Edge	John Pasquin

=== Animation ===
- Static Shock (2000-2001; first season only)

directed by Denys Cowan, Dan Riba

- Waynehead (1996–1997)

directed by Damon Wayans

- Cool Like That Christmas (1994)

directed by David Feiss, Swinton O. Scott III

=== Music videos ===
- "Michael Jackson: Remember the Time" 1992

directed by John Singleton

=== Documentaries ===
- Meet Bob Shaye 2004

directed by Jeffery Schwartz

- Maryanne e gli altri (Italy) 1995

directed by Ita Cesa, Giuseppe Selva
