= Return to Forever: The Anthology =

Compilation album by Return to Forever
- Released: May 2008
- Recorded: 1973–1976
- Studio: Record Plant Studios, N.Y. (1973–1975) and Caribou Ranch, Colorado (1976)
- Genre: Jazz-rock
- Label: Concord Records
- Producer: Chick Corea and Stanley Clarke

Return to Forever chronology
Return to the Seventh Galaxy: The Anthology (1996)	Return to Forever: The Anthology (2008)	Returns (2009)

Professional ratings
Review scores
Source	Rating
AllMusic	4/5 stars
All About Jazz	(not rated)

Return to Forever: The Anthology is a compilation of the "electric years" of jazz fusion band Return to Forever. The collection features newly remixed selections from Where Have I Known You Before and No Mystery, along with the entire Hymn of the Seventh Galaxy and Romantic Warrior albums. Remixing was performed by Mick Guzauski at Mad Hatter Studios, with mastering by Bernie Grundman at Bernie Grundman Mastering.

== Track listing ==
=== Disc one ===
1. "Hymn of the Seventh Galaxy" (Chick Corea) – 3:31
2. "After the Cosmic Rain" (Stanley Clarke) – 8:25
3. "Captain Señor Mouse" (Corea) – 9:01
4. "Theme to the Mothership" (Corea) – 8:49
5. "Space Circus, Pts. 1 & 2" (Corea) – 5:42
6. "The Game Maker" (Corea) – 6:46
7. "Vulcan Worlds" (Clarke) – 7:51
8. "The Shadow of Lo" (Lenny White) – 7:32
9. "Beyond the Seventh Galaxy" (Corea) – 3:13
10. "Song to the Pharaoh Kings" (Corea) – 14:21

Track 1–6: from Hymn of the Seventh Galaxy (1973, complete)
Track 7–10: from Where Have I Known You Before (1974)

=== Disc two ===
1. "Dayride" (Clarke) – 3:25
2. "Sofistifunk" (White) – 3:51
3. "No Mystery" (Corea) – 6:10
4. "Celebration Suite Part I & II" (Corea) – 14:01
5. "Medieval Overture" (Corea) – 5:14
6. "Sorceress" (White) – 7:34
7. "The Romantic Warrior" (Corea) – 10:52
8. "Majestic Dance" (Al Di Meola) – 5:01
9. "The Magician" (Clarke) – 5:29
10. "Duel of the Jester and the Tyrant Part I & II" (Corea) – 11:26

Track 1–4: from No Mystery (1975)
Track 5–10: from Romantic Warrior (1976, complete)

== Chart performance ==
Year	Chart	Position
2008	Billboard Top Contemporary Jazz	4
