= Return to the Seventh Galaxy: The Anthology =

Compilation album by Return to Forever featuring Chick Corea
- Released: September 1996
- Genre: Jazz fusion, latin jazz, post-bop
- Label: Polydor / Verve

Return to Forever featuring Chick Corea chronology
Live (1978)	Return to the Seventh Galaxy: The Anthology (1996)	Return to Forever: The Anthology (2008)

Professional ratings
Review scores
Source	Rating
All About Jazz	(highly recommended)
AllMusic	4/5 stars
The Penguin Guide to Jazz Recordings	3.5/4 stars

Return to the 7th Galaxy: The Anthology is a 1996 compilation of 1972-1975 recordings made by bands assembled by Chick Corea under the name Return to Forever. The collection includes tracks from the albums Light as a Feather, Hymn of the Seventh Galaxy, Where Have I Known You Before and No Mystery, together with four previously unreleased tracks.

== Track listing ==
CD disc 1:

1. "500 Miles High" (Chick Corea, Neville Potter)
2. "Captain Marvel" (Corea)
3. "Light as a Feather" (Stanley Clarke, Flora Purim)
4. "Spain" [previously unreleased live version] (Corea, Joaquín Rodrigo)
5. "After the Cosmic Rain" [previously unreleased live version] (Clarke)
6. "Bass Folk Song" [previously unreleased live version] (Clarke)
7. "Hymn of the Seventh Galaxy" (Corea)
8. "Captain Señor Mouse" (Corea)
9. "Theme to the Mothership" (Corea)

Disc 2:

1. "Vulcan Worlds" (Clarke)
2. "Beyond the Seventh Galaxy" (Corea)
3. "Earth Juice" (Corea, Clarke, Lenny White, Al Di Meola)
4. "The Shadow of Lo" [previously unreleased live version] (White)
5. "Where Have I Known You Before?" (Corea)
6. "Song to the Pharaoh Kings" (Corea)
7. "Dayride" (Clarke)
8. "No Mystery" (Corea)
9. "Flight of the Newborn" (Di Meola)
10. "Celebration Suite (Parts I & II)" (Corea)

== Personnel ==
- Chick Corea – keyboards (acoustic piano, Fender Rhodes electric piano, Hohner clavinet, Yamaha electric organ, synthesizers), marimba, gongs
- Stanley Clarke – double bass, electric bass guitar
- Flora Purim – vocals, percussion (CD1 on tracks 1–3)
- Joe Farrell – flute, tenor saxophone (CD1 on tracks 1–3)
- Airto Moreira – drums (CD 1 on tracks 1–3)
- Bill Connors – acoustic guitar, electric guitar (CD1 on tracks 4–9)
- Mingo Lewis – percussion (CD1 on tracks 4–6)
- Steve Gadd – drums (CD1 on tracks 4–6)
- Al Di Meola – electric guitar, acoustic guitar (CD2)
- Lenny White – drums, percussion, congas, bongos, marimba (CD1 on tracks 7–9, CD2)
