= Howard Hewett discography =

- Studio albums: 7
- EPs: 1
- Live albums: 2
- Compilation albums: 1
- Singles: 24
- Video albums: 2
- Live albums: 2

This is the discography documenting albums and singles released by the American R&B singer-songwriter Howard Hewett.

== Albums ==
=== Studio albums ===
Title	Album details	Peak chart positions		
Title	Album details	US	US R&B	US Gospel
I Commit to Love	Released: June 25, 1986; Label: Elektra; Formats: CD, cassette, LP	159	14	—
Forever and Ever	Released: May 25, 1988; Label: Elektra; Formats: CD, cassette, LP	110	30	—
Howard Hewett	Released: March 12, 1990; Label: Elektra; Formats: CD, cassette, LP	54	8	—
Allegiance	Released: November 17, 1992; Label: Elektra; Formats: CD, cassette, LP	—	73	—
It's Time	Released: 1994; Label: Expansion; Formats: CD, digital download	181	29	—
The Journey	Released: February 13, 2001; Label: Epic; Formats: CD, digital download	—	—	29
If Only	Released: May 15, 2007; Label: The Machine Productions; Formats: CD, digital download	—	66	—
"—" denotes releases that did not chart or were not released in that territory.

=== Christmas albums ===
Title	Album details
Howard Hewett Christmas	Released: October 15, 2008; Label: The Machine Productions; Formats: CD, digital download

=== Live albums ===
Title	Album details
The Journey Live... from the Heart	Released: October 22, 2002; Label: Eagle; Formats: CD, digital download
Intimate	Released: May 3, 2005; Label: Shout! Factory; Formats: CD, digital download

== Singles ==
Title	Year	Peak chart positions				Album
Title	Year	US	US R&B	US A/C	US A/R	Album
"Obsession"	1985	—	90	—	—	The Heavenly Kid - OST
"I'm for Real"	1986	90	2	31	—	I Commit to Love
"Stay"	1986	—	8	—	—	I Commit to Love
"I Commit to Love"	1986	—	12	—	—	I Commit to Love
"Say Amen"	1987	—	54	—	—	I Commit to Love
"Another Chance to Love" (featuring Dionne Warwick)	1988	—	42	24	—	Reservations for Two
"Strange Relationship" (featuring Lynn Davis)	1988	—	9	—	—	Forever and Ever
"Once, Twice, Three Times"	1988	—	15	—	—	Forever and Ever
"Forever and Ever"	1988	—	—	—	—	Forever and Ever
"Show Me"	1990	62	2	33	—	Howard Hewett
"If I Could only Have that Day Back"	1990	—	14	—	—	Howard Hewett
"Let Me Show You How to Fall in Love"	1990	—	67	—	—	Howard Hewett
"I Can't Tell You Why"	1991	—	24	30	—	Non-album single
"Save Your Sex for Me"	1992	—	70	—	—	Allegiance
"How Fast Forever Goes"	1993	—	—	23	—	Allegiance
"This Love Is Forever"	1994	—	35	—	24	It's Time
"I Wanna Know You"	1995	—	61	—	40	It's Time
"This Is for the Lover in You" (with Babyface, LL Cool J, Jody Watley, and Jeffrey Daniel)	1996	6	2	—	21	The Day
"Mercy"	2001	—	—	—	—	The Journey
"Joy"	2001	—	—	—	—	The Journey
"Enough" (featuring George Duke)	2007	—	—	—	17	If Only
"Can U Feel Me"	2007	—	72	—	20	If Only
"I Wanna Know"	2008	—	—	—	30	If Only
"You Still Live Inside of Me"	2014	—	—	—	—	Non-album single
"A Love of My Own"	2017	—	—	—	—	Non-album single
"—" denotes releases that did not chart or were not released in that territory.
