= 500 Miles High =

Jazz song

Song by Chick Corea and Return to Forever

from the album Light as a Feather
- Released: 1973
- Recorded: October 1972
- Studio: IBC, London
- Genre: Jazz fusion
- Length: 9:06
- Label: Polydor
- Composer: Chick Corea
- Lyricist: Neville Potter
- Producer: Chick Corea

"500 Miles High" is a jazz fusion song by American musician Chick Corea and Return to Forever. Composed by Corea with lyrics by Neville Potter, it was recorded in 1972 for the group's second album, Light as a Feather, which was released in 1973. Brazilian singer Flora Purim provides the vocal and the piece became her signature song and a jazz standard.

== Composition and lyrics ==
"500 Miles High" is one of three pieces on Light as a Feather which feature vocals by Purim. At over nine minutes in length, it is largely an instrumental and contains three verses. The song opens with a brief electric piano intro by Corea, then Purim sings the opening verse:

Someday you'll look into her eyes
Then there'll be no goodbyes
And yesterday will have gone
You'll find yourself in another space
500 miles high

Although the song has sometimes been connected to drug culture, Potter's lyrics express romantic love. After solos by the band members, Purim returns to the verses and concludes with a scat-style coda.

== Critical reception ==
Critic Michael G. Nastos referred to the song as "beautiful", but wrote that it "unfortunately became a hippie drug anthem." He also wrote of the album Light as a Feather that "From a historical perspective, this is the most important effort of Corea's career". Tom Moon wrote of the song's "ethereal lyrics well matched to the sounds." Hernan M. Campbell wrote that the song is "overwhelmed with explosive and spontaneous musicianship." He also wrote about the influence of Miles Davis on the band, and how the album Light as a Feather had diverged from the pattern set by other jazz fusion artists who had been similarly influenced. Campbell further wrote that the album as a whole is an "undeniable classic", and that it is "evidence that Return To Forever are, and will always be, recognized as one of the most distinguished acts in their respective genre."

Ron Drotos writes of the rubato style with which the song starts, before shifting to a "medium Latin" tempo: "Rubato playing is an extremely important part of jazz piano playing, particularly when you're accompanying vocalists, yet many pianists don't really learn to do this well. Corea's playing here is a good introduction to the style, but remember that he's able to play fast keyboard fills because vocalist Flora Purim is an accomplished professional and won't get confused by anything he plays."

Dave Worley writes "Chick's solo is a remarkable example of post bop melodic invention, and with its use of pentatonics, chromaticism, and polyrhythmic motion" and links to a video analyzing the song by Don Glanden of the University of the Arts in Philadelphia.

Brian Harker writes of the song's "characteristically 'Brazilian' approach".

Richard J. Lawn writes that "Tunes such as '500 Miles High' ... all remain significant contributions to the repertoire today. In all of these pieces Corea shows a love of strong melodies, interesting extended form structures, Spanish and Brazilian attributes, including Brazilian samba rhythms, and a light, airy group sound." Lawn also writes that Stan Getz's inclusion of Corea's songs, including "500 Miles High" on his album Captain Marvel, and including them in Getz's performances (where Return to Forever played as a backup band) helped popularize Corea's work, because the Light as a Feather album had not then been released in the United States. Lawn mentions that some of Corea's compositions were commissioned by Getz.

The Rough Guide to Jazz describes "500 Miles High", along with "Captain Marvel" and "Spain" as "some of Corea's best compositions".

Elements of the Jazz Language for the Developing Improvisor uses the song as an example of harmonic generalization. Paul E. Rinzler comments on the use of fermatas at the end of short phrases in "500 Miles High".

== Accolades ==
Corea was nominated for "Best Improvised Jazz Solo" for "500 Miles High" by the American Association of Independent Music in 2012. Forever, a two disc album including a version of "500 Miles High", reached number four on Billboard's Jazz Albums chart.

== Other renditions ==
Jazz saxophonist Stan Getz recorded an early version of "500 Miles High" for his album Captain Marvel. He performs it as an instrumental, with the melody line played on saxophone. Along with drummer Tony Williams, Getz is backed by Corea on piano, Stanley Clarke on bass, and Airto Moreira on percussion, who were just forming Return to Forever. Although the piece was recorded in 1972, the album was not released until 1974. AllMusic critic Thom Jurek describes Getz "shapeshifting his way through the mode changes on 'Five Hundred Miles High'" and Captain Marvel as "arguably the finest recording Getz made during the 1970s." Getz recorded "500 Miles High" several times during his career.

In 1974, Flora Purim performed the song at the Montreux Jazz Festival. Described as "wilder and more electric than in its Return to Forever studio version", the concert recording became the title track to her album, 500 Miles High. As one of her signature tunes, she revisited the song often and several are in release.

Transformative jazz pianist George Shearing recorded the piece in 1977 for his album, also titled 500 Miles High. It is featured alongside mostly bebop jazz standards, making it the sole contemporary tune on the album. In 2009, the Manhattan Transfer interpreted the song for their tribute album, The Chick Corea Songbook. Nastos describes it as "the most well-revered '500 Miles High,' as rich angelic voices reach for the heavens in wordless refrains holding tension and a modicum of energy, again quite unlike the initial famous version done by Return to Forever with Purim." Other recordings include those by Joe Pass (Virtuoso No. 2, 1976), Azymuth (Outubro, 1980), and Joe Farrell (Sound of Jazz, 1988), who played saxophone on the original with Return to Forever.
