= Live (Return to Forever album) =

Live album by Return to Forever
- Released: 1978
- Recorded: May 20–21, 1977
- Venues: Palladium Theatre, New York City, USA
- Genre: Jazz-rock
- Length: 49:12 (LP); 167:15 (4LP/3CD); 151:46 (2CD)
- Label: Columbia
- Producer: Return to Forever

Return to Forever chronology
Musicmagic (1977)	Live (1978)	Return to the Seventh Galaxy: The Anthology (1996)

Chick Corea chronology
Musicmagic (1977)	Live (1978)	The Mad Hatter (1978)

Alternative covers
- Live 2CD cover (1992, US).

Alternative cover
- Live: The Complete Concert 2CD cover (2000, US).

Alternative cover
- The Complete Columbia Albums Collection (2011) 5CD boxed set cover

Professional ratings
Review scores
Source	Rating
AllMusic	4/5 stars

Live is a concert recording by fusion band Return to Forever. It was recorded at the Palladium in New York City on May 20 & 21, 1977 as part of the tour to support the Musicmagic album. This was the only tour to feature the 1977 group, which included original members Chick Corea, bassist Stanley Clarke and saxophonist Joe Farrell, along with keyboardist/vocalist Gayle Moran (previously in Mahavishnu Orchestra), and a six-piece horn section.

Originally released as a single LP, the album was re-issued in 1978 as a four LP set called Return to Forever Live: The Complete Concert, which contained the full concert as heard by those who attended, including extended sections of dialogue and audience applause.

== Release history ==
The original release was a single LP with a cover featuring the MoMA version of Pablo Picasso's Three Musicians. A greatly expanded version of the album was released in 1978 on four LPs as Return to Forever Live: The Complete Concert, showcasing the entire two-hour-and-forty-minute concert. This Complete Concert release features a plain dark blue cover with a stylized 'RTF' logo and contains the entireties of pieces that had been edited down for the original one LP release, including a version of "Spanish Fantasy"; the intro to which was previously released in edited form as "Chick's Piano". Also included are spoken introductions to songs by Stanley Clarke, including one in which he is heckled by the audience for announcing the concert's final piece.

In June 2011 Columbia (Sony) released a five CD boxed set, Return to Forever, The Complete Columbia Albums Collection which includes the entire 1977 Live: The Complete Concert recording on three CDs together with 1976's Romantic Warrior and 1977's Musicmagic studio albums.

In September 2011 the three CD version Return to Forever Live: The Complete Concert, 3-Record Set was released in Japan as a Blue-Spec CD limited boxset reproducing the original Japanese 1978 four LP boxset. However, this 2011 reissue features "The Endless Night" and "Musicmagic" as one track each, instead of the original splits and fades of each song.

== Track listing ==
All songs written and composed by Chick Corea, except where noted.

=== Live ===
Side one
No.	Title	Writer(s)	Length
1.	"So Long Mickey Mouse"	Stanley Clarke	6:53
2.	"The Musician"		7:03
3.	"Chick's Piano"		4:35
4.	"Musicmagic"	Corea, Gayle Moran	6:29

Side two
No.	Title	Writer(s)	Length
1.	"The Moorish Warrior and Spanish Princess"	Clarke	6:39
2.	"Come Rain or Come Shine"	Harold Arlen, Johnny Mercer	3:19
3.	"The Endless Night (part I)"	Corea, Moran	8:00
4.	"The Endless Night (part II)"	Corea, Moran	7:14

=== Live: The Complete Concert – original vinyl pressing (1978)[4LP] ===
Side one
No.	Title	Writer(s)	Length
1.	"Opening '77"		7:07
2.	"The Endless Night (part 1)"	Corea, Moran	12:14

Side two
No.	Title	Writer(s)	Length
1.	"The Endless Night (part 2)"	Corea, Moran	8:19
2.	"Introduction of Musicians"		3:44
3.	"The Musician"		14:03

Side three
No.	Title	Writer(s)	Length
1.	"Introduction / Hello Again"	Clarke	7:41
2.	"So Long Mickey Mouse"	Clarke	11:01
3.	"Musicmagic (part 1)"	Corea, Moran	3:46

Side four
No.	Title	Writer(s)	Length
1.	"Musicmagic (part 2) / Applause"	Corea, Moran	23:45

Side five
No.	Title	Writer(s)	Length
1.	"Introduction / Come Rain or Come Shine / Fine and Dandy"	Mercer, Arlen; Kay Swift, James Warburg	3:55
2.	"Serenade"		15:01

Side six
No.	Title	Writer(s)	Length
1.	"The Moorish Warrior and Spanish Princess"	Clarke	19:30

Side seven
No.	Title	Length
1.	"Introduction / Chick's Piano Solo"	17:05

Side eight
No.	Title	Writer(s)	Length
1.	"Spanish Fantasy"		11:20
2.	"On Green Dolphin Street"	Bronisław Kaper, Ned Washington	9:21

=== Live: The Complete Concert (US, 1992)[2CD] ===
Disc one
No.	Title	Writer(s)	Length
1.	"Opening '77"		7:10
2.	"The Endless Night / Introduction of Musicians"	Corea, Moran	20:23
3.	"The Musician"		6:58
4.	"Stanley's Introduction"		1:24
5.	"Hello Again"	Clarke	6:02
6.	"So Long Mickey Mouse"	Clarke	6:43
7.	"Musicmagic"	Corea, Moran	27:26

Disc two
No.	Title	Writer(s)	Length
1.	"Introduction / Come Rain or Come Shine / Fine and Dandy"	Mercer, Arlen; Kay Swift, James Warburg	3:55
2.	"Serenade"		14:53
3.	"The Moorish Warrior and Spanish Princess"	Clarke	19:20
4.	"Stanley's Introduction"		2:02
5.	"Spanish Fantasy"		24:46
6.	"Chick's Closing Introductions"		1:09
7.	"On Green Dolphin Street"	Bronisław Kaper, Ned Washington	9:35

=== Live: The Complete Concert – 3 Record Set (Japan, 1993)[3CD] ===
Disc one
No.	Title	Writer(s)	Length
1.	"Opening '77"		7:07
2.	"The Endless Night (part 1)"	Corea, Moran	12:14
3.	"The Endless Night (part 2) / Introduction of Musicians"	Corea, Moran	12:02
4.	"The Musician"		14:03

Disc two
No.	Title	Writer(s)	Length
1.	"Introduction / Hello Again"	Clarke	7:41
2.	"So Long Mickey Mouse"	Clarke	11:01
3.	"Musicmagic (part 1)"	Corea, Moran	3:46
4.	"Musicmagic (part 2) / Applause"	Corea, Moran	23:45

Disc three
No.	Title	Writer(s)	Length
1.	"Introduction / Come Rain or Come Shine / Fine and Dandy"	Mercer, Arlen; Kay Swift, James Warburg	3:56
2.	"Serenade"		15:03
3.	"The Moorish Warrior and Spanish Princess"	Clarke	19:39
4.	"Introduction / Chick's Piano Solo"		17:08
5.	"Spanish Fantasy"		11:53
6.	"On Green Dolphin Street"	Bronisław Kaper, Ned Washington	8:49

=== Live: The Complete Concert – 3 Record Set (Japan, 2011)[3CD] ===
Disc one
No.	Title	Writer(s)	Length
1.	"Opening '77"		7:09
2.	"The Endless Night"	Corea, Moran	20:30
3.	"Chick Corea: Spoken Intro of the Musicians"		3:43
4.	"The Musician"		14:04

Disc two
No.	Title	Writer(s)	Length
1.	"Stanley Clarke: Spoken Intro to Hello Again / So Long Mickey Mouse"		1:38
2.	"Hello Again"	Clarke	6:02
3.	"So Long Mickey Mouse"	Clarke	10:51
4.	"Musicmagic"	Corea, Moran	27:57

Disc three
No.	Title	Writer(s)	Length
1.	"Come Rain or Come Shine / Fine and Dandy"	Mercer, Arlen; Kay Swift, James Warburg	3:55
2.	"Stanley Clarke: Spoken Intro to Serenade"		0:58
3.	"Serenade"		13:56
4.	"Chick Corea: Spoken Intro to The Moorish Warrior and Spanish Princess"		1:05
5.	"The Moorish Warrior and Spanish Princess"	Clarke	18:16
6.	"Stanley Clarke: Spoken Intro to Chick Corea's Piano Solo"		2:01
7.	"Chick's Piano Solo"		14:31
8.	"Spanish Fantasy"		11:21
9.	"On Green Dolphin Street"	Bronisław Kaper, Ned Washington	9:30

== Personnel ==
- Chick Corea – Steinway grand piano, Fender Rhodes electric piano, Hohner clavinet, Yamaha electric organ, synthesizers (ARP Odyssey, Minimoog, Moog 15 modular, Oberheim Eight Voice), effects MXR Digital Delay, vocals
- Gayle Moran – Hammond B3 organ, Yamaha CP70 electric piano, Mellotron, Synthesizers (Minimoog, Polymoog) vocals
- Joe Farrell – piccolo flute, flute, soprano saxophone, tenor saxophone
- James Tinsley – piccolo trumpet, trumpet, flugelhorn
- John Thomas – piccolo trumpet, trumpet, flugelhorn
- Jim Pugh – lead tenor trombone, baritone horn
- Ron Moss – tenor trombone
- Harold Garrett – bass trombone, baritone horn, tuba
- Stanley Clarke – Alembic electric bass, acoustic bass, vocals
- Gerry Brown – drums

== Chart performance ==
Year	Chart	Position
1978	Billboard 200	155
1978	Billboard Jazz Albums	12
