= Hideaway =

Hideaway or Hide Away may refer to:

== Film ==
- Hideaway (1937 film), an American comedy film
- Hideaway (1995 film), an American horror film by Brett Leonard
- Hideaway (2009 film) or The Refuge, a French film by François Ozon
- Hide Away (film), a 2011 American film by Chris Eyre

== Music ==
- Hideaway (jazz club), a jazz venue in south London

=== Albums ===
- Hideaway (America album) (1976)
- Hideaway (David Sanborn album) (1980)
- Hideaway (The Weepies album) (2008)
- Hideaway (Wavves album) (2021)
- Hideaway, a 1986 album by Stanley Clarke
- Hideaway, a 2012 album by Matt Bianco

=== Songs ===
- "Hide Away" (instrumental), a 1960 composition by Freddie King; covered by Eric Clapton, Stevie Ray Vaughan, and other artists
- "Hideaway" (Tessanne Chin song) (2006)
- "Hideaway" (Cockney Rebel song) (1974)
- "Hide Away" (Daya song) (2015)
- "Hideaway" (De'Lacy song) (1995)
- "Hideaway" (Delays song) (2006)
- "Hideaway" (Kiesza song) (2014)
- "Hideaway" (Dave Dee, Dozy, Beaky, Mick & Tich song) (1966)
- "Hideaway", a 1986 song by Berlin from Count Three & Pray
- "(Wish I Could) Hideaway", a 1970 song by Creedence Clearwater Revival from Pendulum
- "Hide Away", a 2004 song by Hilary Duff from Hilary Duff
- "Hideaway", a 1987 song by Erasure from The Circus
- "Hideaway", a 1998 song by Fuel from Sunburn
- "Hideaway", a 2000 song by Ivy from Long Distance
- "Hideaway", a 2016 song by Jacob Collier from In My Room
- "Hideaway", a 2017 song by Queens of the Stone Age from Villains
- "Hide Away", a 2018 song by Synapson from Super 8
- "Hideaway", a 2005 song by Barbra Streisand from Guilty Pleasures

== Other uses ==
- Hideaway, Texas
- Hideaway (novel), a 1992 novel by Dean Koontz
- Hideaway (U.S. Senate), secret offices used by members of the United States Senate
- Hide Away (Hazbin Hotel AMV)

== See also ==
- The Hideaways (disambiguation)
