= The Hideaways =

The Hideaways may refer to:

- The Hideaways (band), beat group that flourished in Liverpool in the 1960s
- The Hideaways, alternative title for the 1973 film From the Mixed-Up Files of Mrs. Basil E. Frankweiler

== See also ==
- Hideaways, a 2011 thriller fantasy film
- Hideaway (disambiguation)
