= Musicmagic =

Studio album by Return to Forever
- Released: 1977
- Recorded: January–February 1977
- Studio: Caribou Ranch (Nederland, Colorado)
- Genres: Jazz-rock, jazz fusion, latin jazz, progressive rock
- Length: 41:51
- Label: Columbia
- Producer: Return to Forever

Return to Forever chronology
Romantic Warrior (1976)	Musicmagic (1977)	Live (1977)

Chick Corea chronology
My Spanish Heart (1976)	Musicmagic (1977)	Live (1977)

Professional ratings
Review scores
Source	Rating
AllMusic	2.5/5 stars
Record Mirror	3/5 stars

Musicmagic is the seventh and final studio album by the American jazz fusion band Return to Forever, released in 1977.

This album contains the final line-up of the band from the 1970s, with only founders Chick Corea and Stanley Clarke returning from the previous album. This is the first album since Light as a Feather (1973) to contain vocals, featuring Stanley Clarke and Corea's wife Gayle Moran. This album also marks the return of original member Joe Farrell on saxophone and flute, along with several new members making up a five-piece horn section.

In addition to the conventional two channel stereo version the album was also released by Columbia in a four channel quadraphonic version in 1977 as one of the last quadraphonic albums released by the label. In 2016 the album was re-issued in stereo on hybrid Super Audio CD by Audio Fidelity. It was re-issued again on SACD by Dutton Vocalion in 2017 containing both the quadraphonic and stereo mixes.

With the addition of trombonist Ron Moss, this lineup toured and recorded the live album Live (1977) which was re-issued in 1978 as a 4-LP set called Return to Forever Live: The Complete Concert.

== Track listing ==
1. "The Musician" (Chick Corea) – 7:12
2. "Hello Again" (Stanley Clarke) – 3:49
3. "Musicmagic" (Corea, Gayle Moran) – 11:00
4. "So Long Mickey Mouse" (Clarke) – 6:09
5. "Do You Ever" (Moran) – 3:59
6. "The Endless Night" (Corea, Moran) – 9:41

== Personnel ==
- Chick Corea – acoustic piano, Fender Rhodes electric piano, Hohner clavinet, synthesizers (ARP Odyssey, Minimoog, Polymoog, Moog 15 modular), vocals
- Gayle Moran – acoustic piano, Hammond B3 organ, Polymoog, vocals
- Joe Farrell – piccolo flute, flute, soprano saxophone, tenor saxophone
- James Tinsley – piccolo trumpet, trumpet
- John Thomas – trumpet, flugelhorn
- James E. Pugh – tenor trombone
- Harold Garret – tenor trombone, bass trombone, baritone horn
- Stanley Clarke – electric bass, acoustic bass, vocals
- Gerry Brown – drums

== Chart performance ==
Year	Chart	Position
1977	Billboard 200	38
1977	Billboard Jazz Albums	4
