= Communications '72 =

Studio album by Stan Getz
- Released: 1972
- Recorded: November 1971; Paris, France
- Genre: Jazz
- Length: 43:24
- Label: Verve; V6 8807
- Producer: Stan Getz

Stan Getz chronology
Change of Scenes (1971)	Communications '72 (1972)	Captain Marvel (1972)

Communications '72 is an album by saxophonist Stan Getz and orchestra arranged and conducted by Michel Legrand which was released on the Verve label in 1972.

== Reception ==
Professional ratings
Review scores
Source	Rating
Allmusic	3/5 stars

The Allmusic review by Stephen Cook stated "As usual, Getz makes it all shine with his golden tone and beguiling solo lines. A good title, but primarily recommended for Getz fans".

== Track listing ==
All compositions by Michel Legrand.

1. "Communications '72" – 3:39
2. "Outhouse Blues" – 5:15
3. "Now You've Gone" – 4:35
4. "Back to Bach" – 3:33
5. "Nursery Rhymes for All God's Children" – 4:39
6. "Soul Dance" – 4:21
7. "Redemption" – 3:18
8. "Flight" – 4:20
9. "Moods of a Wanderer" – 3:46
10. "Bonjour Tristesse" – 7:01

== Personnel ==
- Stan Getz – tenor saxophone
- Eddy Louiss – organ
- Christiane Legrand – vocals
- Unidentified orchestra, strings and choir arranged and conducted by Michel Legrand

== Charts ==
=== Monthly charts ===
Monthly chart performance for Communications '72
Chart (1976)	Peak position
Soviet International Albums (Moskovskij Komsomolets)	2
