= Forever and Ever (Howard Hewett album) =

Studio album by Howard Hewett
- Released: 1988
- Studio: Various: Avatar Recording Studio (Malibu, California); Elumba Recording Studio (Hollywood, California); Ground Control Recording Studio (Santa Monica, California); Ignited Recording Studio (Hollywood, California); Le Gonks Recording Studio (Hollywood, California); Lighthouse Recording Studio (North Hollywood, California); Lion Share (Los Angeles, California); Love Town Recording Studio (Los Angeles, California); Music Grinder Recording Studio (Los Angeles, California); Rhet's Place (Los Angeles, California); Skip Saylor's Recording Studio (Los Angeles, California); Sound Castle Recording Studio (Silverlake, California); Space Station Recording Studio (Hollywood, California); Studio Masters (Los Angeles, California)
- Length: 44:52
- Label: Elektra
- Producers: Howard Hewett; Monty Seward; Aaron Zigman; George Duke; Jerry Knight; Tom Keane; Vincent Brantley

Howard Hewett chronology
| I Commit to Love (1986) | Forever and Ever (1988) | Howard Hewett (1990) |

Singles from Forever and Ever
- 1. "Strange Relationship" Released: 1988; 2. "Once, Twice, Three Times" Released: 1988; 3. "Forever And Ever" Released: 1988

Professional ratings
Review scores
| Source | Rating |
|---|---|
| AllMusic | 3/5 stars |
| The Rolling Stone Album Guide | 2.5/5 stars |

Forever and Ever is the second solo studio album by American singer-songwriter Howard Hewett. It was released in 1988 via Elektra Records. Recording sessions for this ten-track album took place at fourteen various recording studios in California. Production was primarily handled by Hewett, along with Monty Seward, Vincent Brantley, George Duke, Tom Keane, Jerry Knight and Aaron Zigman.

The album peaked at number 110 on the us Billboard 200 album chart and at number 30 on the Top R&B/Hip-Hop Albums chart. It was supported by three hit singles: "Strange Relationship", "Once, Twice, Three Times" and "Forever and Ever". "Strange Relationship" and "Once, Twice, Three Times" made it to the Hot R&B/Hip-Hop Songs chart, reaching number 9 and number 15 respectively.

== Track listing ==
| No. | Title | Lyrics | Music | Producer(s) | Length |
|---|---|---|---|---|---|
| 1. | "Strange Relationship" | Howard Hewett | Monty Seward | Monty Seward, Hewett | 4:17 |
| 2. | "Natural Love" | Hewett | Vincent Brantley | Brantley, Hewett | 4:55 |
| 3. | "Once, Twice, Three Times" | Hewett | Kenny Aubrey | Hewett | 4:16 |
| 4. | "You'll Find Another Man" | Hewett | Seward | Seward, Hewett | 4:13 |
| 5. | "Forever and Ever" | Hewett | Seward | Seward, Hewett | 5:42 |
| 6. | "Shakin' My Emotion" | Seward | Seward | Seward, Hewett | 4:23 |
| 7. | "Share a Love" | Michael Himelstein, Tom Keane | Himelstein, Keane | Keane, Hewett | 5:06 |
| 8. | "This Time" | Hewett | George Duke | Duke, Hewett | 5:01 |
| 9. | "Challenge" | Hewett | Aaron Zigman, Jerry Knight | Zigman, Knight, Hewett | 4:59 |
| 10. | "Goodbye Good Friend" | Hewett | Seward | Seward, Howard Hewett | 4:13 |
| Total length: | | | | | 44:52 |

== Personnel and credits ==
Musicians

- Howard Hewett – lead vocals, backing vocals (1–3, 5–8, 10)
- Monty Seward – keyboards (1, 3, 6), synthesizer programming (1, 3–6, 10)
- Vincent Brantley – keyboards (2), keyboard bass (2)
- David Zeman – keyboards (2), synthesizer programming (2)
- Jeff Carruthers – synthesizer programming (2)
- George Duke – keyboards (3), Synclavier strings (3), Synclavier (8)
- Rex Salas – keyboards (4)
- Tom Keane – keyboards (7), backing vocals (7)
- Rhett Lawrence – synthesizer programming (7)
- John Keane – synth bass (7), drum programming (7)
- Jerry Knight – all instruments (9), backing vocals (9)
- Aaron Zigman – all instruments (9)
- Paul Jackson Jr. – guitars (1, 3)
- Ray Fuller – guitars (2, 4, 6, 8)
- Michael Landau – guitars (5, 7)
- Norman Merter – guitars (6)
- Kevin Chokan – guitars (10)
- Jim Blair – hi-hat overdubs (1, 2), cymbal overdubs (3), drums (4)
- Tris Imboden – drums (3, 10)
- Paulinho da Costa – percussion (2, 5)
- Gerald Albright – saxophone solo (2–4)
- Ronnie Laws – saxophone solo (8)
- Lynn Davis – backing vocals (1, 5, 8)
- Josie James – backing vocals (2, 3, 5, 8, 9)
- Karyn White – backing vocals (2, 5, 7)
- Kimaya Seward – backing vocals (3, 6)
- Alex Brown – backing vocals (5)
- Carl Caldwell – backing vocals (5)
- James Ingram – backing vocals (5, 9)
- Phil Perry – backing vocals (5)
- Marva King – backing vocals (9)

Music arrangements

- Howard Hewett – vocal arrangements (1–5, 7–10), music arrangements (3)
- Monty Seward – music arrangements (1, 3–6, 10), vocal arrangements (6)
- Vincent Brantley – music arrangements (2)
- Tom Keane – music and vocal arrangements (7)
- George Duke – music arrangements (8)
- Jerry Knight – music arrangements (9)

Production

- Tommy Vicari – mixing, recording (1, 3–5, 7, 10)
- Reginald Dozier – recording (2)
- Gary Skardina – recording (2, 4–6, 9)
- Joel Soyffer – recording (2)
- Sabrina Buchanek – recording (3)
- David Rideau – recording (3)
- Jeffrey 'Woody' Woodruff – recording (7)
- Mitch Gibson – recording (8)
- Erik Zobler – recording (8)
- Gary Wagner – recording (9)
- Gregg Barrett – additional engineer (1), assistant engineer (3–6)
- Cliff Jones – additional engineer (1), assistant engineer (3, 5, 7, 10), recording (6)
- Pat MacDougau – additional engineer (1), assistant engineer (3–6, 7)
- Linda Pina – additional engineer (1), assistant engineer (4, 6, 7, 10)
- Walter Spencer – additional engineer (1), assistant engineer (3–5)
- Lori Fumar – assistant engineer (2, 4, 8)
- Toni Greene – assistant engineer (5)
- Brian Gardner – mastering at Bernie Grundman Mastering (Hollywood, California)
- Dina Andrews – production coordinator
- Carol Bobolts – design
- Randee St. Nicholas – photography

== Charts ==
| Chart (1988) | Peak position |
|---|---|
| US Billboard 200 | 110 |
| US Top R&B/Hip-Hop Albums (Billboard) | 30 |
