= The Mothership Returns =

Live album by Return to Forever
- Released: June 18, 2012
- Recorded: July 12, 2011, September 13, 2011
- Venue: Austin, Texas (September); Montreux, Switzerland (July)
- Genre: Jazz fusion
- Length: 112:30
- Label: Eagle
- Producer: Tim Cavanaugh, Stanley Clarke, Chick Corea, Geoff Kempin, Adam Mason, Bill Rooney, Terry Shand, Lenny White

Return to Forever chronology
Forever (2009)	The Mothership Returns (2012)	Live in Japan 1983 (2021)

Chick Corea chronology
Hot House (2012)	The Mothership Returns (2012)	The Vigil (2013)

Professional ratings
Review scores
Source	Rating
All About Jazz	4.5/5.0 stars
AllMusic	4/5.0 stars

The Mothership Returns is a live two CD/single DVD set by the fusion band Return to Forever. Released 18 June 2012 by Eagle Rock Entertainment, it documents music performed during the 2011 tour, for which Return to Forever was expanded to a quintet with Chick Corea, Stanley Clarke, Lenny White and new members Jean-Luc Ponty on violin and Frank Gambale on guitar. The album peaked #6 in the 2012 and 2013 Jazz Album charts.

== Track listing ==
=== Disc one ===
No.	Title	Length
1.	"Medieval Overture" (Chick Corea)	6:03
2.	"Senor Mouse" (Corea)	12:10
3.	"Shadow of Lo/Sorceress" (Lenny White)	16:05
4.	"Renaissance" (Jean-Luc Ponty)	19:40

=== Disc two ===
No.	Title	Length
1.	"After the Cosmic Rain" (Stanley Clarke)	16:52
2.	"The Romantic Warrior / Señor Blues" (Corea, Horace Silver)	18:20
3.	"Concierto de Aranjuez / Spain" (Corea, Joaquín Rodrigo)	8:12
4.	"School Days" (Clarke)	11:24
5.	"Beyond the Seventh Galaxy" (Corea)	3:44

=== DVD-Video ===
1. Inside the Music (film, documentary)
2. "After the Cosmic Rain" (Live, Austin, Texas)
3. "The Romantic Warrior" (Live, Montreux, Switzerland)
4. The Story of Return to Forever (sneak peek movie trailer)

== Personnel ==
Musicians

- Chick Corea – acoustic piano, keyboards
- Stanley Clarke – double bass, electric bass
- Lenny White – drums
- Jean-Luc Ponty – violin
- Frank Gambale – acoustic guitar, electric guitar

Production

- Devin Villery – audio systems technician
- Bernie Kirsch – monitor engineer
- Travis Rogers – sound engineer
- Tim Cavanaugh – producer
- Stanley Clarke – co- & executive producer
- Chick Corea – co- & executive producer
- Geoff Kempin – executive producer
- Terry Shand – executive producer
- Lenny White – producer, executive producer
- Terry Cooley – production manager
- Rob Griffin – tour manager
- Mick Guzauski – mixing
- Buck Snow – mixing
- Greg Calbi – mastering
- Adam Mason – editing, producer
- Kris Campbell – tour manager
- Paul May – tour manager
- James "McGoo" McGregor – stage technician
- Brian Alexander – keyboard technician
- Eric "Stretch" Hanson – bass technician
- Jim Moran – drum technician
- Matt Druzbik – lighting director
- Evelyn Brechtlein – production coordination
- Anna Robertson – production assistant
- Librado Barocio – director
- Dan Muse – liner note coordination
- Liner notes by Chick Corea, Jean-Luc Ponty, Frank Gambale, Stanley Clarke, Lenny White, Robert Trujillo
- Graphic design by Marc Bessant, Julie Rooney
- Photography by Matt Bizer, Andrew Elliott, Martin Philby, Arne B. Rostad

== Chart performance ==
Year	Chart	Position
2012	Billboard Jazz Albums	6
