= Light as a Feather =

Studio album by Return to Forever
- Released: January 1973
- Recorded: October 8 & 15, 1972
- Studios: IBC, London, England
- Genre: Jazz fusion
- Length: 42:46
- Label: Polydor
- Producer: Chick Corea

Return to Forever chronology
Return to Forever (1972)	Light as a Feather (1973)	Hymn of the Seventh Galaxy (1973)

Chick Corea chronology
Return to Forever (1972)	Light as a Feather (1973)	Crystal Silence (1973)

Professional ratings
Review scores
Source	Rating
AllMusic	5/5 stars
The Penguin Guide to Jazz Recordings	4/4 stars
The Rolling Stone Jazz Record Guide	4/5 stars
Sputnikmusic	5/5

Light as a Feather is the first studio album credited to jazz band Return to Forever led by keyboardist Chick Corea (credited as "Chick Corea and Return to Forever"). It features saxophonist/flautist Joe Farrell, bassist Stanley Clarke, vocalist Flora Purim and her husband, drummer/percussionist Airto Moreira, who all performed on Corea's previous album Return to Forever, from which the group took its name.

== Content ==
The style of the music remains mostly the same as the first album, though Purim's vocals were given a larger role. Corea produced the album for Polydor Records. Clarke played double bass, though for most of his later career he has played bass guitar.

"Captain Marvel" is a fast Latin piece that provided the name for Stan Getz's album released in the same year (with Corea, Clarke and Moreira guesting). Airto plays percussion and Purim sings without words during the song's main riff.

The album ends with "Spain", which was inspired by, and whose introduction was taken from, Joaquín Rodrigo's Concierto de Aranjuez (1939).

This was the second of only two albums featuring the band's original line-up. Purim and her husband Airto would leave after its release (to be replaced by guitarist Bill Connors and drummer Lenny White); Joe Farrell also left at this time, but would return to the band for their seventh and eighth albums (Musicmagic and Live); bassist Stanley Clarke remained with the band through all of its line-up changes.

== Reception and legacy ==
Light as a Feather won the 1972 Playboy Jazz Album of the year and has been selected by many magazines and polls as one of the greatest jazz albums ever recorded. For many years this album has been listed on The Absolute Sound super disc list and the Stereophile list of "Records to Die For". It is also featured in Tom Moon's 1,000 Albums to Hear Before You Die.

== Track listing ==
Light as a Feather track listing
No.	Title	Lyrics	Music	Length
1.	"You're Everything"	Neville Potter	Chick Corea	5:11
2.	"Light as a Feather"	Flora Purim	Stanley Clarke	10:57
3.	"Captain Marvel"	None	Corea	4:53
4.	"500 Miles High"	Potter	Corea	9:07
5.	"Children's Song"	None	Corea	2:47
6.	"Spain"	None	Corea (Note: The introduction is an excerpt from Concierto de Aranjuez by Joaquín Rodrigo.)	9:51

Bonus disc (1998 2-CD remaster)
No.	Title	Lyrics	Music	Length
1.	"Matrix"	None	Corea	8:10
2.	"Light as a Feather" (alternative take)	Purim	Clarke	10:46
3.	"500 Miles High" (alternative take)	Potter	Corea	10:32
4.	"Children's Song" (alternative take)	None	Corea	3:58
5.	"Spain" (composite alternative take)	None	Corea	5:33
6.	"Spain" (alternative take)	None	Corea	9:02
7.	"What Games Shall We Play Today?"	Potter	Corea	3:52
8.	"What Games Shall We Play Today?" (alternative take 1)	Potter	Corea	4:06
9.	"What Games Shall We Play Today?" (alternative take 2)	Potter	Corea	3:46
10.	"What Games Shall We Play Today?" (alternative take 3)	Potter	Corea	3:49

== Personnel ==
- Chick Corea – Fender Rhodes electric piano
- Stanley Clarke – double bass
- Flora Purim – vocals (CD1: 1–4, 6; CD2: 2, 3, 5–10), percussion
- Joe Farrell – flute, soprano saxophone, tenor saxophone
- Airto Moreira – drums, percussion

== Charts ==
Chart performance for Light as a Feather
Chart (1973)	Peak position
US Billboard Jazz Albums	6
