= Forever (Corea, Clarke & White album) =

Live album / Studio album by Chick Corea, Stanley Clarke and Lenny White
- Released: June 6, 2011
- Recorded: September 1, 16, 17 & 30, November 28 and December 12, 2009
- Venue: Yoshi's Jazz Club (Oakland, CA); Monterey Jazz Festival (Monterey, CA); Blue Note Tokyo (Tokyo, Japan); Jazz Alley Club (Seattle, WA)
- Studio: Mad Hatter Studios (Los Angeles, CA
- Genre: Jazz, jazz fusion
- Length: 138:57
- Label: Concord; CRE-32627-2
- Producer: Lenny White

Chick Corea chronology
Five Peace Band Live (2009)	Forever (2011)	Orvieto (2011)

Return to Forever chronology
Returns (2008)	Forever (2009)	The Mothership Returns (2011)

Forever is a double CD album of live acoustic recordings recorded in California, Tokyo and Seattle in 2009 by the Return to Forever pianist Chick Corea, bass player Stanley Clarke and drummer Lenny White and studio rehearsals with guests Jean-Luc Ponty, Bill Connors and Chaka Khan. It was released on the Concord label I 2011.

== Reception ==
Professional ratings
Review scores
Source	Rating
All About Jazz	4.5/5 stars
AllMusic	3.5/5 stars
The Guardian	3/5 stars
PopMatters	7/10 stars

In 2012, the album received the Grammy Award for Best Jazz Instrumental Album.

All About Jazz correspondent John Kelman observed, "Eschewing RTF's relentless testosterone, the trio is as capable of elegance and understatement as it is of unequivocal virtuosity".

The AllMusic review by Thom Jurek states "Disc one is taken directly from concert appearances across the globe. The standards work well – considering how busy Chick Corea, Stanley Clarke, and Lenny White can be together as well as solo... The gems are saved for disc two, which consists mainly of rehearsals for the tour recorded at Mad Hatter Studios in San Francisco, complete with off-mike banter... With its looseness, this second disc offers the real dynamic potential for RTF in the future and reveals the depth of near symbiotic communication between the bandmembers".

John Fordham in The Guardian noted "Clarke's beautiful tone and dramatic phrasing, White's melodic percussion playing and deft embroidery of catchy grooves, and Corea's fluency and lyrical grace bring a new spark to standards... The electric disc is a lot funkier... and the light touch and sense of enjoyment of the acoustic half mostly survives intact".

PopMatters' Will Layman wrote "The trio recordings are masterful in execution but maybe slightly "been there, done that" in repertoire... On the bonus disc, we get more of a mishmash.. The band is loose as can be in this rehearsal, tossing phrases back and forth, the whole enterprise seeming like the dialogue that jazz is always supposed to be".

== Track listing ==
All compositions by Chick Corea except where noted.

Disc one

1. "On Green Dolphin Street" (Bronisław Kaper, Ned Washington) – 8:41
2. "Waltz for Debby" (Bill Evans) – 9:55
3. "Bud Powell" (with Tony Cohan) – 7:10
4. "La Canción de Sofia" (Stanley Clarke) – 7:38
5. "Windows" – 8:54
6. "Hackensack" (Thelonious Monk) – 7:30
7. "No Mystery" – 10:55
8. "Señor Mouse" – 12:06
- Recorded at Yoshi's Jazz Club, Oakland, CA, on September 16 & 17, 2009 (tracks 1–4, 7 & 8)
- Recorded at Blue Note Jazz Club, Tokyo, Japan on November 28, 2009 (track 5)
- Recorded at Jazz Alley Club, Seattle, WA, on December 12, 2009 (track 6)

Disc two

1. "Captain Marvel" – 4:13
2. "Señor Mouse" – 10:06
3. "Crescent" (John Coltrane) – 1:45
4. "Armando's Rhumba" – 5:12
5. "Renaissance" (Jean-Luc Ponty) – 6:29
6. "High Wire: The Aerialist" (with Tony Cohan) – 3:41
7. "I Loves You, Porgy" (George Gershwin, Ira Gershwin) – 5:13
8. "After the Cosmic Rain" (Clarke) – 10:38
9. "Space Circus" – 6:06
10. "500 Miles High" – 12:45
- Recorded at Mad Hatter Studios, Los Angeles, CA, on September 1, 2009 (tracks 1–9)
- Recorded at the Monterey Jazz Festival, Monterey, CA, on September 30, 2009 (track 10)

== Personnel ==
- Chick Corea – acoustic piano (1.1–1.8, 2.3–2.7, 2.10); keyboards (2.1, 2.2, 2.8, 2.9)
- Stanley Clarke – double bass (1.1–1.8, 2.1, 2.4–2.7, 2.10); electric bass (2.2, 2.8 & 2.9)
- Lenny White – drums (1.1–1.8, 2.1–2.3, 2.5–2.10)

Guest musicians

- Jean-Luc Ponty – violin (2.4, 2.5, 2.7–2.9)
- Bill Connors – guitar (2.2, 2.7–2.9)
- Chaka Khan – vocals (2.6, 2.7)

== Charts ==
Year	Chart	Position
2011	Billboard Top Jazz Albums	4
2011	Billboard Traditional Jazz Albums	2
