= Returns (album) =

Album by fusion band Return to Forever

Live album by Return to Forever
- Released: March 17, 2009
- Recorded: July 18 & 31, 2008, August 6, 2008
- Venues: Stravinski Auditorium, Montreux Jazz Festival (July 18), Ruth Eckerd Hall, Clearwater, Florida (July 31), Bank of America Pavilion, Boston, Massachusetts (August 6)
- Genre: Jazz fusion
- Label: Eagle
- Producers: Terry Shand, Claude Nobs

Return to Forever chronology
Return to Forever: The Anthology (2008)	Returns (2009)	Forever (2011)

Chick Corea chronology
Duet (2008)	Returns (2009)	Five Peace Band Live (2009)

Professional ratings
Review scores
Source	Rating
All About Jazz	(favorable)
AllMusic	3.5/5.0 stars
Popmatters	(7/10)

Returns is a live album by American fusion band Return to Forever. Released in 2009 by Eagle Records, it is the first recording by the band after a hiatus of 32 years. Also in 2009 a video recording of the band's live performances from the "Returns" tour at Montreux, Switzerland and (bonus material) Clearwater, Florida was released by Eagle Rock Entertainment as Returns: Live at Montreux 2008.

== CD track listing ==
=== Disc one ===
1. "Opening Prayer" (Chick Corea) – 2:03
2. "Hymn of the Seventh Galaxy" (Corea) – 3:43
3. "Vulcan Worlds" (Stanley Clarke) – 13:45
4. "Sorceress" (Lenny White) – 11:22
5. "Song to the Pharaoh Kings" (Corea) – 27:13
6. Al's Solo, including – 8:54
  - "Children's Song #3" (Corea) duet with Chick Corea
  - "Passion Grace & Fire" (di Meola)
  - "Mediterranean Sundance" (di Meola)
  - "Café 1930" (Astor Piazzolla)
  - "Spain" (Corea, Joaquín Rodrigo) duet with Chick Corea
7. "No Mystery" (Corea) – 8:52

=== Disc two ===
1. "Friendship" (Corea) Chick's Solo, including "Solar" (Miles Davis) – 8:52
2. "Romantic Warrior" (Corea) – 7:19
3. "El Bayo de Negro" Stanley's Solo (Clarke) – 11:25
4. "Lineage" Lenny's Solo (White) – 7:39
5. "Romantic Warrior" (continued) (Corea) – 3:03
6. "Duel of the Jester and the Tyrant" (Corea) – 14:03

Bonus tracks

7. "500 Miles High" (Corea) – 12:48
8. BBC Lifetime Achievement Award to RTF as presented by Sir George Martin, including a performance of "Romantic Warrior" – 8:20

Recorded at the:

- Ruth Eckerd Hall, Clearwater, Florida, the U.S., July 31, 2008 (tracks 1.1–2.5)
- Bank of America Pavilion, Boston, Massachusetts, the U.S., August 6, 2008 (track 2.6)
- Stravinski Auditorium, Montreux Jazz Festival, Switzerland, July 18, 2008 (track 2.7)

Returns: Live at Montreux 2008

Video by Return to Forever
- Released: May 12, 2009
- Recorded: July 18 & 31, 2008
- Venues: Stravinski Auditorium, Montreux Jazz Festival (July 18), Ruth Eckerd Hall, Clearwater, Florida (July 31)
- Genre: Jazz fusion
- Length: 149 minutes
- Label: Eagle Rock Entertainment

== DVD-Video track listing ==
Main show – Stravinski Auditorium, Montreux Jazz Festival, Switzerland, 18 July 2008

1. Introduction
2. "Hymn of the Seventh Galaxy" (Chick Corea)
3. "Vulcan Worlds" (Stanley Clarke)
4. "Sorceress" (Lenny White)
5. "Song to the Pharaoh Kings" (Corea)
6. Al's solo
7. "No Mystery" (Corea)
8. "Chick's Solo
9. "Romantic Warrior" (Corea)
10. "El Bayo de Negro" (Stanley's solo)
11. "Lineage" (Lenny's solo)
12. "Romantic Warrior" (conclusion) (Corea)

Bonus tracks – Ruth Eckerd Hall, Clearwater, Florida, 31 July 2008

13. "Lineage" (Lenny's solo)
14. Al's solo
15. "Friendship" (Chick's solo)
16. "El Bayo de Negro" (Stanley's solo)
17. "Duel of the Jester and the Tyrant" (Corea)

== Personnel ==
Return to Forever

- Chick Corea – Yamaha grand piano C3MP, Rhodes Midi Piano Mark V, synthesizers (Minimoog Voyager, Sequential Circuits Prophet-5, Yamaha Motif)
- Al Di Meola – acoustic and electric guitar
- Stanley Clarke – electric and acoustic bass
- Lenny White – drums

CD production

- Return To Forever – producer
- Bernie Kirsh – engineer (recording, mixing)
- Buck Snow – engineer (mixing)
- Doug Sax – engineer (mastering)
- Marc Bessant – artwork, cover

DVD-Video production

- Return To Forever – producer, engineer (mixing)
- Christine Strand – producer (video), director
- Josh Adams – producer (video)
- Buck Snow – engineer (mixing)
- E. Churchod – photography
- Georges A. Braunschweig – photography

== Chart performance ==
Year	Chart	Position
2009	Billboard Top Contemporary Jazz	2
