= My Spanish Heart =

Studio album by Chick Corea
- Released: October 1976
- Recorded: October 1976
- Studio: Kendun Recorders Burbank, California
- Genre: Jazz
- Length: 73:03 (original album) / 77:36 (2000 expanded and remastered edition)
- Label: Polydor; Verve (reissue)
- Producer: Chick Corea

Chick Corea chronology
Romantic Warrior (1976)	My Spanish Heart (1976)	Musicmagic (1977)

Professional ratings
Review scores
Source	Rating
AllMusic	4.5/5 stars
The Penguin Guide to Jazz Recordings	2/4 stars
The Rolling Stone Jazz Record Guide	3/5 stars
The Village Voice	B+
DownBeat	5/5 stars

My Spanish Heart is a studio album by Chick Corea, recorded and released in 1976. Prominent guest musicians include Corea’s Return to Forever bandmate Stanley Clarke on basses, violinist Jean-Luc Ponty, drummers Steve Gadd and Narada Michael Walden and Corea’s wife Gayle Moran on vocals.

The album combines jazz fusion pieces and more traditional Latin music pieces. The album includes use of full brass and string sections on some tracks. "El Bozo" suite relies heavily on the use of synthesizers while "Spanish Fantasy" suite is mostly acoustic. The first four tracks form a suite as well. “Armando’s Rhumba” is now widely considered a jazz standard.

== Critical reception ==
My Spanish Heart received a five-star review from DownBeat magazine.

== Track listing ==
All tracks composed by Chick Corea (except "The Hilltop" w/ Stanley Clarke)

=== Side one ===
1. "Love Castle" – 4:45
2. "The Gardens" – 3:12
3. "Day Danse" – 4:27
4. "My Spanish Heart" – 1:37
5. "Night Streets" – 6:08

=== Side two ===
1. "The Hilltop" – 6:16
2. "The Sky (Children Song No. 8 / Portrait of Children Song No. 8)" – 4:57
3. "Wind Danse" – 5:00

=== Side three ===
1. "Armando's Rhumba" – 5:19
- El Bozo – 11:32
1. "Prelude to El Bozo" – 1:34
2. "El Bozo, Part 1 – 2:52
3. "El Bozo, Part 2" – 2:03
4. "El Bozo, Part 3" – 5:03

=== Side four ===
- Spanish Fantasy – 19:42
1. "Spanish Fantasy, Part 1" – 6:06
2. "Spanish Fantasy, Part 2" – 5:14
3. "Spanish Fantasy, Part 3" – 3:06
4. "Spanish Fantasy, Part 4" – 5:16

=== Bonus track ===
1. "The Clouds" – 4:33

Note: "The Sky" was omitted from CD editions released during the 1980s and '90s, as the entire double-LP-length album wouldn't fit onto a single disk at that time. This track has been included in more recent CD editions (the absolute length of audio CDs has increased over the years due to more efficient designing systems), along with the previously unreleased track "The Clouds". Due to consolidation in the record industry over the later part of the 20th century, recent issues of the album are now on the jazz label Verve Records.

== Personnel ==
- Chick Corea – acoustic piano, Fender Rhodes electric piano, Yamaha electric organ, synthesizers (ARP Odyssey, Minimoog, Polymoog, Moog Model 15 modular synthesizer), percussion, vocals, production, arrangement, composer
- Stanley Clarke – double bass, bass guitar
- Steve Gadd – drums
- Narada Michael Walden – drums, handclaps
- Don Alias – percussion
- Jean-Luc Ponty – violin
- Gayle Moran – vocals
- String quartet:
  - Connie Kupka – violin
  - Barry Socher – violin
  - Carole Mukogawa – viola
  - David Speltz – cello
- Brass section:
  - Stuart Blumberg – trumpet
  - John Rosenburg – trumpet
  - John Thomas – trumpet
  - Ron Moss – trombone

== Charts ==
Chart (1977)	Peak position
Billboard Top Jazz Albums	2
Billboard Top Pop Albums	55
