= James E. Pugh =

American trombonist and composer

James Pugh
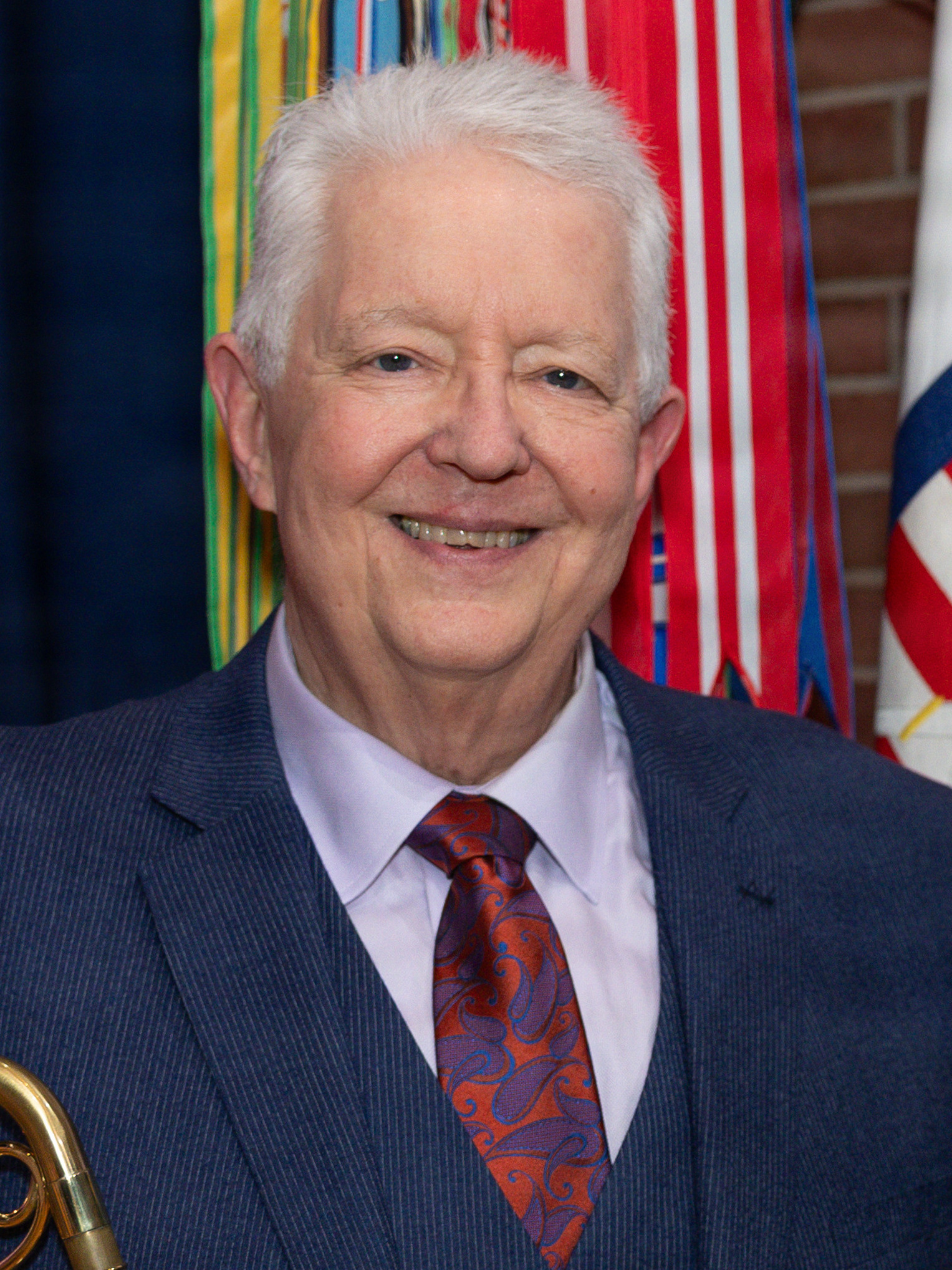
- Pugh in 2026

Background information
- Born: James Edward Pugh; November 12, 1950 (age 75); Butler, Pennsylvania, U.S.
- Genres: Jazz, classical, rock
- Occupations: Musician, composer
- Instrument: Trombone

James Edward Pugh (born November 12, 1950) is an American trombonist and composer. He was a trombonist with Woody Herman (1972–1976) and briefly with Chick Corea before concentrating on session work.

== Early life ==
Pugh was born in Butler, Pennsylvania, on November 12, 1950. Pugh began playing the trombone around the age of ten. He attended the Eastman School of Music from 1968 to 1972, where he played in an ensemble under Chuck Mangione.

== Later life and career ==
Pugh toured and recorded with the Woody Herman Band for four years from 1972, and briefly performed with Chick Corea in 1977. He then concentrated on studio session work for jazz and popular musicians. In 1984, he was co-leader for the album The Pugh–Taylor Project. He also composed for and played on the album X Over Trombone.

== Discography ==
As Leader

- 1981: Crystal Eyes (Pewter)
- 1984: The Pugh /Taylor Project (DMP)
- 2001: Pugh Mosso
- 2002: E'nJ "Legend and Lion" with Eijiro Nakagawa Japanese release
- 2004: Echano
- 2004: E2'nJ2 (TNC)
- 2006: E'nJ Just Us
- 2007: X Over Trombone (Albany)
- 2007: Holly and the Ivy
- 2012: The Devil's Hopyard (Jazzmaniac)
- 2012: Pugh Taylor II (Pewter)

As sideman

- 1972: Giant Steps, Woody Herman
- 1973: Thundering Herd, Woody Herman
- 1976: The 40th Anniversary Concert, Woody Herman
- 1977: Musicmagic, Chick Corea and Return to Forever
- 1977: Return to Forever – Live, Chick Corea
- 1978: Secret Agent, Chick Corea
- 1979: In a Temple Garden (CTI, 1979) Yusef Lateef
- 1988: The Disney Album, Barbara Cook
- 1989: When Harry Met Sally..., Harry Connick, Jr.
- 1990: Big Boss Band, George Benson
- 1992: League of Their Own, James Taylor
- 1993: What Headphones?, André Previn
- 1994: Mr. Gentle Mr. Cool, David "Fathead" Newman
- 1994: Scampi Fritti, Marc Beacco
- 1995: Honey and Rue, with Kathleen Battle; St. Luke's Orchestra, André Previn, conductor
- 1995: Leave Your Mind Behind, With the Joe Roccisano Orchestra
- 1995: Rush Hour, with Joe Lovano; Gunther Schuller, conductor
- 1996: Two Lane Highways, Jay Leonhart and Friends
- 1999: Crossing the Bridge, Eileen Ivers
- 1999: Songs from the Last Century, George Michael
- 2000: Eight, Walter Blanton
- 2000: Two Against Nature, Steely Dan
- 2002: Looking for America, Carla Bley
- 2003: Alegría, Wayne Shorter
- 2003: Everything Must Go Steely Dan
- 2006: Morph the Cat, Donald Fagen
- 2007: This Meets That, John Scofield
- 1989–present Manhattan Jazz Orchestra
- 1998–present Super Trombone
- 2012: Sunken Condos, Donald Fagen
- 2020: Joy Road Volume 6, University of Illinois Concert Jazz Band

Broadway Recordings

- 1979 Sweeney Todd
- 1992 City of Angels
- 1995 Will Rogers' Follies
- 1998 Victor/Victoria
- 2000 Fosse

Motion picture soundtracks (featured soloist)

- League Of Their Own
- Meet Joe Black
- The Birdcage
- Brighton Beach Memoirs
- Shining Through
- Biloxi Blues

Classical (not as soloist)

- Mass, Charles Wuorinen
- Ponder Nothing, The Chamber Music of Ben Johnston, Music Amici
- The Music of Irwin Bazelon
- Collage – New York Trombone Quartet
- Bright Sheng: Lacerations, 92nd St. Y Orchestra, Gerard Schwartz, conductor
- EOS Orchestra
- Concordia Orchestra
- The Silk Road Project with YoYo Ma
- The Graham Ashton Brass Ensemble Plays the Music of James Pugh and Daniel Schnyder, Graham Ashton Brass Ensemble
