= Return to Forever (Chick Corea album) =

Studio album by Chick Corea
- Released: September 1972 (Germany, Japan); 1975 (US)
- Recorded: February 2–3, 1972
- Studios: A & R Studios; New York City
- Genre: Jazz fusion
- Length: 46:48
- Labels: ECM; ECM 1022 ST
- Producer: Manfred Eicher

Chick Corea chronology
Piano Improvisations Vol. 2 (1972)	Return to Forever (1972)	Light as a Feather (1973)

Return to Forever chronology
Return to Forever (1972)	Light as a Feather (1973)

Return to Forever is a jazz fusion album by Chick Corea recorded over two days in February 1972 but was not released in the USA until 1975—Corea's fourth release for the label. It is the debut of a quintet featuring singer Flora Purim, flautist/saxophonist Joe Farrell, bassist Stanley Clarke and percussionist Airto Moreira, who would go on to record under the name Return to Forever.

Professional ratings
Review scores
Source	Rating
AllMusic	5/5 stars
The Rolling Stone Jazz Record Guide	5/5 stars
The Penguin Guide to Jazz Recordings	4/4 stars

== Background ==
On March 3, 1972, saxophonist Stan Getz recorded an early version of "La Fiesta" for Captain Marvel (1974), backed by Corea, Clarke and Moreira along with drummer Tony Williams. The composition would become the middle section of the album's B-side, "Sometime Ago – La Fiesta" a full version of which can be found on the compilation Chick Corea – Selected Recordings (2002).

Purim would go on to sing her part of the medley, "Sometime Ago", on her fifth solo album, Open Your Eyes You Can Fly (1976).

== Reception ==
The record is often considered one of the classic albums in electric jazz.

== Track listing ==
All music is composed by Chick Corea.

Side I
No.	Title	Lyrics	Length
1.	"Return to Forever"		12:06
2.	"Crystal Silence"		6:59
3.	"What Game Shall We Play Today"	Neville Potter	4:30
Total length:			23:35

Side II
No.	Title	Lyrics	Length
1.	"Sometime Ago – La Fiesta"	Potter	23:13
Total length:			23:13 46:48

== Personnel ==
Return to Forever

- Chick Corea – Fender Rhodes electric piano
- Joe Farrell – flute, soprano saxophone
- Stanley Clarke – electric bass guitar (tracks 1–3), double bass (track 4)
- Airto Moreira – drums, percussion
- Flora Purim – vocals, percussion

Technical personnel

- Manfred Eicher – producer
- Tony May – engineer
- Michael Manoogian – cover photography

== Chart performance ==
Year	Chart	Position
1975	Billboard Jazz Albums	8
