= I Commit to Love =

Album by Howard Hewett

Studio album by Howard Hewett
- Released: June 25, 1986
- Studio: Various: Larrabee Sound Studios (Hollywood, California); Mama Jo's Recording Studios and Americayn Studios (North Hollywood, CA); Le Gonks West, Ground Control Studios, Soundcastle, The Village Studios and Lion Share (Los Angeles, CA); Studio 99 (Thousand Oaks, CA); Nick's Place Recording Studio (West Covina, CA); Steve Ford Studio (Chicago, IL)
- Length: 49:58
- Label: Elektra
- Producers: Howard Hewett; George Duke; Glen J. Barbee; Monty Seward; Ross Vannelli; Stanley Clarke

Howard Hewett chronology
I Commit to Love (1986)	Forever and Ever (1988)

Singles from I Commit to Love
- 1. "I'm for Real" Released: 1986; 2. "Stay" Released: 1986; 3. "I Commit to Love" Released: 1986; 4. "Say Amen" Released: 1986

Professional ratings
Review scores
Source	Rating
AllMusic	4/5 stars

I Commit to Love is the debut solo studio album by American singer-songwriter Howard Hewett. It was released on June 25, 1986, via Elektra Records. The album serves his first release after he departed from the group Shalamar. Recording sessions for this ten-track album took place at nine various recording studios viz. Americayn Studios, Ground Control Studios, Larrabee Sound Studios, Le Gonks West, Mama Jo's, Nick's Place, Soundcastle, Studio 99 and Village Studios. Together with Hewett, George Duke, Stanley Clarke, Glen J. Barbee, Ross Vannelli and Monty Seward worked on the production of the album.

The album spawned four hit singles: "I'm for Real", "Stay", "I Commit to Love" and "Say Amen". Its lead single, "I'm for Real", produced by Hewett and Clarke, reached number 90 on the US Billboard Hot 100 singles chart and number 2 on the Hot R&B/Hip-Hop Songs chart. "Stay", the title track "I Commit to Love" and "Say Amen" also made it to the Hot R&B/Hip-Hop Songs chart, peaking at number 8, number 12 and number 54 respectively. The album peaked at number 159 on the US Billboard 200 album chart and at number 14 on the Top R&B/Hip-Hop Albums chart.

== Track listing ==
No.	Title	Writer(s)	Producer(s)	Length
1.	"Stay"	Howard Hewett; Ross Vannelli; Ed Grenga	Ross Vannelli; Howard Hewett	4:35
2.	"I'm for Real"	Howard Hewett; Stanley Clarke	Stanley Clarke; Howard Hewett	4:53
3.	"Last Forever"	Howard Hewett; Ross Vannelli; Ed Grenga	Ross Vannelli; Howard Hewett	4:11
4.	"I Commit to Love"	Howard Hewett; Leon Sylvers III	Glen J. Barbee; Howard Hewett	4:12
5.	"In a Crazy Way"	Tony Collins	Stanley Clarke; Howard Hewett	4:55
6.	"Love Don't Wanna Wait"	Glen J. Barbee; Kevin Grady; Leon Sylvers III	Glen J. Barbee; Howard Hewett	4:22
7.	"I Got to Go"	Howard Hewett; George Duke	George Duke; Howard Hewett	4:39
8.	"Eye on You"	Howard Hewett; George Terry; Kitty Terry; David Ritz	George Duke	4:00
9.	"Let's Try It All Over Again"	Howard Hewett; Monty Seward; Adele Hewett McDaniels	Monty Seward; Howard Hewett	4:23
10.	"Say Amen"	Howard Hewett; Monty Seward	Monty Seward; Howard Hewett	4:35

== Personnel and credits ==
Musicians

- Howard Hewett – lead vocals, backing vocals (1–3, 5–10)
- Ed Grenga – keyboards (1, 3), guitars (1), drum programming (1)
- George Duke – keyboards (2, 7, 8), strings (2, 7, 8)
- Monty Seward – keyboards (4, 6, 9, 10), drum programming (10)
- Joseph "Joey" Gallo – keyboards (4), drum programming (4)
- Robert Brookins – keyboards (5)
- Todd Cochran – keyboards (5)
- Raymond A. Crossley – keyboards (6)
- Kevin Grady – keyboards (6), drum programming (6)
- John Joseph Barnes – keyboards (9)
- Paul Jackson Jr. – guitars (2–4, 6–10)
- Kevin Chokan – guitars (5)
- Stanley Clarke – bass (2)
- Gerald Albright – bass (9, 10)
- Tris Imboden – drums (2, 3, 5, 9)
- Paulinho da Costa – percussion (8)
- Ronald Bruner Jr. – tom-tom overdubs (10)
- Wilton Felder – saxophone solo (2)
- George Howard – saxophone solo (7)
- Josie James – backing vocals (1, 3–10)
- Ross Vannelli – backing vocals (1, 3)
- Glen J. Barbee – backing vocals (4, 6)
- Nadia Deleye – backing vocals (4)
- Nicole Krauss – backing vocals (4)
- Alejandra Loiaza – backing vocals (4)
- Carolyn Vigiga – backing vocals (4)
- Gwen Evans – backing vocals (6)
- Deniece Williams – backing vocals (10)

Production

- Howard Hewett – producer (1–5, 7, 9, 10), engineer (1)
- Ross Vannelli – producer (1, 3), engineer (1, 3, 10)
- Stanley Clarke – producer (2, 5)
- Glen J. Barbee – producer (4, 6)
- George Duke – producer (7, 8)
- Monty Seward – producer (9, 10)
- Frank Byron Clark – mixing (1, 4, 6, 9, 10), engineer (6, 9, 10)
- Darwin Foye – engineer (2, 4–6, 9, 10)
- Steve Hodge – engineer (2, 5)
- Csaba Petocz – engineer (2, 5)
- Tommy Vicari – mixing (2, 3)
- Paul Ratajczak – engineer (2, 5, 6, 9, 10), mixing (5)
- Ed Grenga – engineer (3)
- Steven Bradley Ford – engineer (4, 6, 10), mixing (10)
- Nyya Lark – engineer (4, 6, 10)
- Jack Rouben – engineer (4)
- Erik Zobler – engineer (4, 7, 8), mixing (7, 8)
- Mitch Gibson – engineer (7)
- Tom Perry – engineer (7)
- Bernie Grundman – mastering at Bernie Grundman Mastering (Hollywood, California)
- Bob Defrin – art direction
- Carol Bobolts – design

== Charts ==
=== Weekly charts ===
Chart (1987)	Peak position
US Billboard 200	159
US Top R&B/Hip-Hop Albums (Billboard)	14

=== Year-end charts ===
Chart (1987)	Position
US Top R&B/Hip-Hop Albums (Billboard)	40
