= Captain Marvel (album) =

Studio album by Stan Getz
- Released: 1975
- Recorded: March 3, 1972
- Studio: A&R; New York City
- Genre: Jazz · jazz fusion
- Length: 46:16
- Label: Columbia
- Producer: Stan Getz

Stan Getz chronology
Communications '72 (1971)	Captain Marvel (1975)	Jazz at the Philharmonic - Jazz at The Santa Monica Civic '72 (1972)

Captain Marvel is a 1975 jazz album by saxophonist Stan Getz, recorded on March 3, 1972, and released on Columbia three years later. The quintet features pianist Chick Corea, who composed most of the material, bassist Stanley Clarke, Brazilian percussionist Airto Moreira and drummer Tony Williams.

== Background ==
Six months after recording Captain Marvel, Corea, Clarke and Moreira—along with Brazilian singer Flora Purim (Moreira's wife) and flautist Joe Farrell—would record Corea's Return to Forever (1972), the pioneering jazz fusion album that spawned the group of the same name. Corea rerecorded and release half of his songs from Captain Marvel with Return to Forever before the Getz album was out—namely: "La Fiesta" on Return to Forever, and "500 Miles High" and the titular track "Captain Marvel" on Light as a Feather (1973).

== Reception ==
Professional ratings
Review scores
Source	Rating
AllMusic	4.5/5.0 stars
The Penguin Guide to Jazz Recordings	2.5/4 stars
PopMatters	(no rating)
The Rolling Stone Jazz Record Guide	4/5 stars

The AllMusic review by Thom Jurek states that "[t]his band, combining as it did the restlessness of electric jazz with Getz's trademark stubbornness in adhering to those principles that made modern jazz so great, made for a tension that came pouring out of the speakers with great mutual respect shining forth from every cut — especially the steamy Latin-drenched title track. Along with Sweet Rain, recorded for Verve, Captain Marvel is the finest recording Getz made in the late 1960s - early 1970s".

== Track listing ==
All compositions by Chick Corea except as noted.

1. "La Fiesta" – 8:21
2. "Five Hundred Miles High" – 8:09
3. "Captain Marvel" - 5:06
4. "Times Lie" – 9:46
5. "Lush Life" (Billy Strayhorn) – 4:14
6. "Day Waves" – 9:39

== Personnel ==
- Stan Getz – tenor saxophone
- Chick Corea – electric piano
- Stanley Clarke – bass
- Airto Moreira – percussion
- Tony Williams – drums

Production

- Recording Engineer: Dixon Van Winkle
- Remix Engineers: John Guerriere & Russ Payne
- Cover Design: Teresa Alfieri
- Cover Logo Design: Gerard Huerta
- Air Brushing: Roger Huyssen
- Back Cover Photo: Don Hunstein

== Chart performance ==
Year	Chart	Position
1975	Billboard 200	191
1975	Billboard Jazz Albums	22
