= Hymn of the Seventh Galaxy =

Studio album by Return to Forever
- Released: October 1973
- Recorded: August 1973
- Studio: Record Plant Studios, New York City
- Genre: Jazz fusion, jazz rock, progressive rock, space rock
- Length: 42:14
- Label: Polydor
- Producer: Chick Corea

Return to Forever chronology
Light as a Feather (1973)	Hymn of the Seventh Galaxy (1973)	Where Have I Known You Before (1974)

Chick Corea chronology
Crystal Silence (1973)	Hymn of the Seventh Galaxy (1973)	Where Have I Known You Before (1974)

Alternative cover
- Non-US version of cover

Professional ratings
Review scores
Source	Rating
AllMusic	4.5/5 stars
Christgau's Record Guide	B
Creem	B
The Rolling Stone Jazz Record Guide	5/5 stars
The Penguin Guide to Jazz Recordings	3/4 stars

Hymn of the Seventh Galaxy is a studio album by American jazz fusion band Return to Forever. It was released in October 1973 by Polydor. It was the first album not to feature Flora Purim, Airto and Joe Farrell, and marked a shift away from the largely acoustic fusion they created. Drummer Lenny White and guitarist Bill Connors make their first appearances with the group. Connors would leave shortly after the album's release.

== Music ==
Drawing on rock and funk, the album emphasized electric instruments more than Return to Forever's previous albums. Clarke contributed one song for the album while Corea wrote the rest of the material. Corea relied mostly on electric piano and organ.

== Critical reception ==
Daniel Gioffre for Allmusic wrote, "it is the quality of the compositions that marks Hymn of the Seventh Galaxy as an indispensable disc of '70s fusion".

== Track listing ==
All tracks are written by Chick Corea except where noted.

Side one
No.	Title	Writer(s)	Length
1.	"Hymn of the Seventh Galaxy"		3:31
2.	"After the Cosmic Rain"	Stanley Clarke	8:25
3.	"Captain Señor Mouse"		9:01

Side two
No.	Title	Length
4.	"Theme to the Mothership"	8:49
5.	"Space Circus, parts 1-2"	5:42
6.	"The Game Maker"	6:46
Total length:		42:14

== Personnel ==
- Chick Corea – acoustic piano, Fender Rhodes electric piano, harpsichord, Yamaha electric organ, gongs
- Bill Connors – electric guitar, acoustic guitar
- Stanley Clarke – electric bass, bell tree
- Lenny White – drums, percussion, congas, bongos

== Chart performance ==
Year	Chart	Position
1973	Billboard 200	124
1974	Billboard Jazz Albums	7
