= Where Have I Known You Before =

Studio album by Return to Forever
- Released: September 1974
- Recorded: July–August 1974
- Studio: Record Plant Studios, New York City
- Genre: Jazz fusion
- Length: 41:27
- Label: Polydor
- Producer: Chick Corea

Return to Forever chronology
Hymn of the Seventh Galaxy (1973)	Where Have I Known You Before (1974)	No Mystery (1975)

Chick Corea chronology
Hymn of the Seventh Galaxy (1973)	Where Have I Known You Before (1974)	No Mystery (1975)

Professional ratings
Review scores
Source	Rating
AllMusic	4/5 stars
Sputnikmusic	4.5/5 stars
The Rolling Stone Jazz Record Guide	3/5 stars
The Penguin Guide to Jazz Recordings	2.5/4 stars

Where Have I Known You Before is a studio album by American jazz group Return to Forever, the first featuring guitarist Al Di Meola, and the second since leader Chick Corea switched to mostly electric instrumentation, playing music heavily influenced by progressive rock, funk and classical.

== Background, instrumentation, compositions ==
Although Return to Forever's style remained unchanged since its previous album, Hymn of the Seventh Galaxy (1973), important changes took place in the band's sound and line-up. Chick Corea started to use synthesizers, such as the Minimoog and ARP Odyssey. An equally important change was the replacement of guitarist Bill Connors with 19-year-old Al Di Meola. Connors left the band before the recording of this album to concentrate on his acoustic solo career. Another reason for his departure was his reluctance to travel; he preferred to stay in the San Francisco area. Also, Bill was not happy with Chick pushing certain aspects of Scientology on him.

Between the album's longer tracks are three of Corea's short piano improvisations that all bore a title beginning with "Where Have I...".

The first track is Stanley Clarke's "Vulcan Worlds" with melodic motifs that appear on Clarke's second solo album Stanley Clarke, also released in 1974. The song shows Clarke is "one of the fastest and most facile electric bassists around". Each player except for drummer Lenny White took long solos.

The next long track is Lenny White's composition "The Shadow of Lo", a piece with many changes in mood. The last track on Side A is Corea's "Beyond the Seventh Galaxy", a sequel to his "Hymn of the Seventh Galaxy", the title track from the group's previous album.

Side B begins with the collective jam "Earth Juice". Most of Side B is taken up by Corea's 14-minute epic "Song to the Pharaoh Kings", a song notable for its use of the harmonic minor scale. The track has a long keyboard introduction, after which Chick Corea is joined by the full band, and an "Eastern" theme appears. Each member of the band plays a long solo.

== Track listing ==
All tracks are written by Chick Corea except where noted.

Side one
No.	Title	Writer(s)	Length
1.	"Vulcan Worlds"	Stanley Clarke	7:51
2.	"Where Have I Loved You Before?"		1:02
3.	"The Shadow of Lo"	Lenny White	7:32
4.	"Where Have I Danced with You Before?"		1:14
5.	"Beyond the Seventh Galaxy"		3:13

Side two
No.	Title	Writer(s)	Length
6.	"Earth Juice"	Corea, Clarke, White, Al Di Meola	3:46
7.	"Where Have I Known You Before?"		2:20
8.	"Song to the Pharaoh Kings"		14:21
Total length:			41:27

== Personnel ==
Musicians

- Chick Corea – acoustic piano, Fender Rhodes electric piano, Hohner clavinet, Yamaha electric organ, synthesizers (ARP Odyssey, Minimoog), percussion
- Al Di Meola – electric guitar, acoustic twelve-string guitar
- Stanley Clarke – electric bass guitar, Yamaha electric organ, bell tree, chimes
- Lenny White – drums, congas, bongos, percussion

Production

- Shelly Yakus – engineer
- Tom Rabstenek – mastering
- Herb Dreiwitz – front cover photography

== Chart performance ==
Year	Chart	Position
1974	Billboard 200	32
1975	Billboard Jazz Albums	5
