= Return to Forever =

American jazz fusion group led by Chick Corea

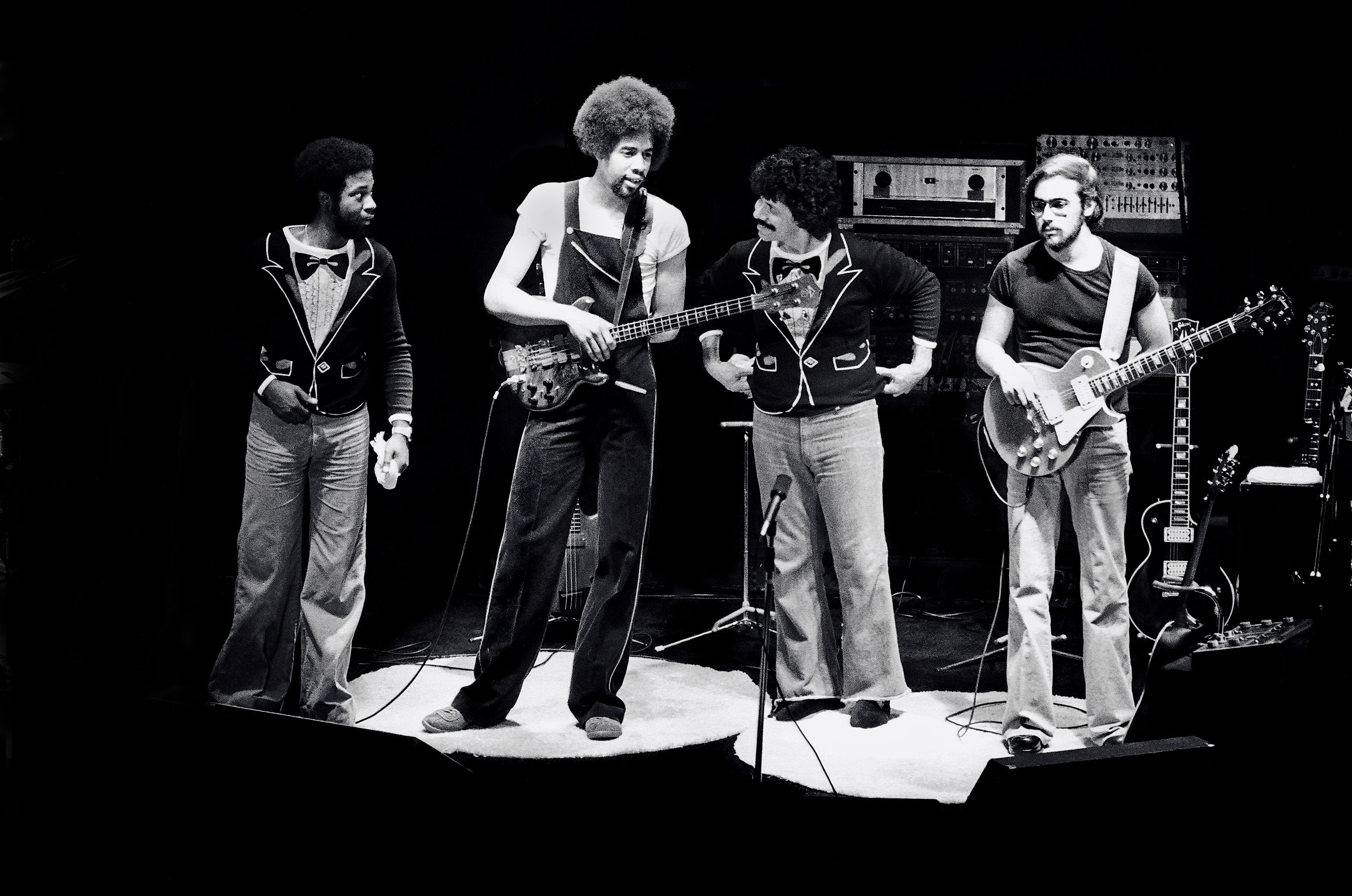
- Return to Forever in Rochester, New York, 1976. Left to right: White, Clarke, Corea, Di Meola

Background information
- Origin: New York City, United States
- Genres: Jazz fusion; big band
- Years active: 1972–1977; 1983; 2008; 2010–2021
- Labels: ECM; Columbia; Polydor
- Past members: Chick Corea; Stanley Clarke; Joe Farrell; Airto Moreira; Flora Purim; Lenny White; Bill Connors; Steve Gadd; Mingo Lewis; Earl Klugh; Al Di Meola; Gerry Brown; Harold Garrett; Gayle Moran; James E. Pugh; John Thomas; James Tinsley; Ron Moss; Frank Gambale; Jean-Luc Ponty
- Website: return2forever.com

Return to Forever was an American jazz fusion band that was founded by pianist Chick Corea in 1972. The band has had many members, with the only consistent bandmate of Corea's being bassist Stanley Clarke. Along with Weather Report, and Mahavishnu Orchestra, Return to Forever is often cited as one of the core groups of the jazz-fusion movement of the 1970s. Several musicians, including Clarke, Flora Purim, Airto Moreira and Al Di Meola, came to prominence through their performances on Return to Forever albums.

After playing on Miles Davis's jazz-fusion albums In a Silent Way (1969) and Bitches Brew (1970), Corea formed an avant-garde jazz band called Circle with Dave Holland, Anthony Braxton and Barry Altschul. In 1972, after converting to Scientology, Corea decided he wanted to communicate better with his audience. This meant performing a more accessible style of music than avant-garde jazz.

Return to Forever first disbanded in 1977 after five years and seven studio albums. The band never released another studio album, but occasionally reunited for live performances until Corea's death in 2021.

== History ==
=== First group (1972–1973) ===
The first edition of Return to Forever performed primarily Latin-oriented music. This initial band consisted of singer and percussionist Flora Purim, her husband Airto Moreira (both Brazilians) on drums and percussion, Corea's longtime musical co-worker Joe Farrell on saxophone and flute, and the young Stanley Clarke on bass. Within this first line-up in particular, Clarke played acoustic double bass in addition to electric bass. Corea's Fender Rhodes electric piano formed the basis of this group's sound; he had yet to discover synthesizers, his trademark sound in the group's later years. Clarke and Farrell were given ample solo space themselves. While Purim's vocals lent some commercial appeal to the music, many of their compositions were also instrumental and somewhat experimental in nature. The music was composed by Corea with the exception of the title track of the second album which was written by Stanley Clarke. Lyrics were often written by Corea's friend Neville Potter, and were quite often Scientology-themed.

Their first album, titled simply Return to Forever, was recorded for ECM Records in 1972, and was initially released only in Europe. This album featured Corea's now famous compositions "Crystal Silence" and "La Fiesta". Shortly afterwards, Corea, Airto, Clarke and Tony Williams formed the band for Stan Getz's album Captain Marvel (recorded in 1972 and released in 1975), which featured Corea's compositions, including some from the first and second Return to Forever albums. Their second album, Light as a Feather (1973), was released by Polydor and included the song "Spain", which also became quite well known.

=== Jazz rock era (1973–1976) ===
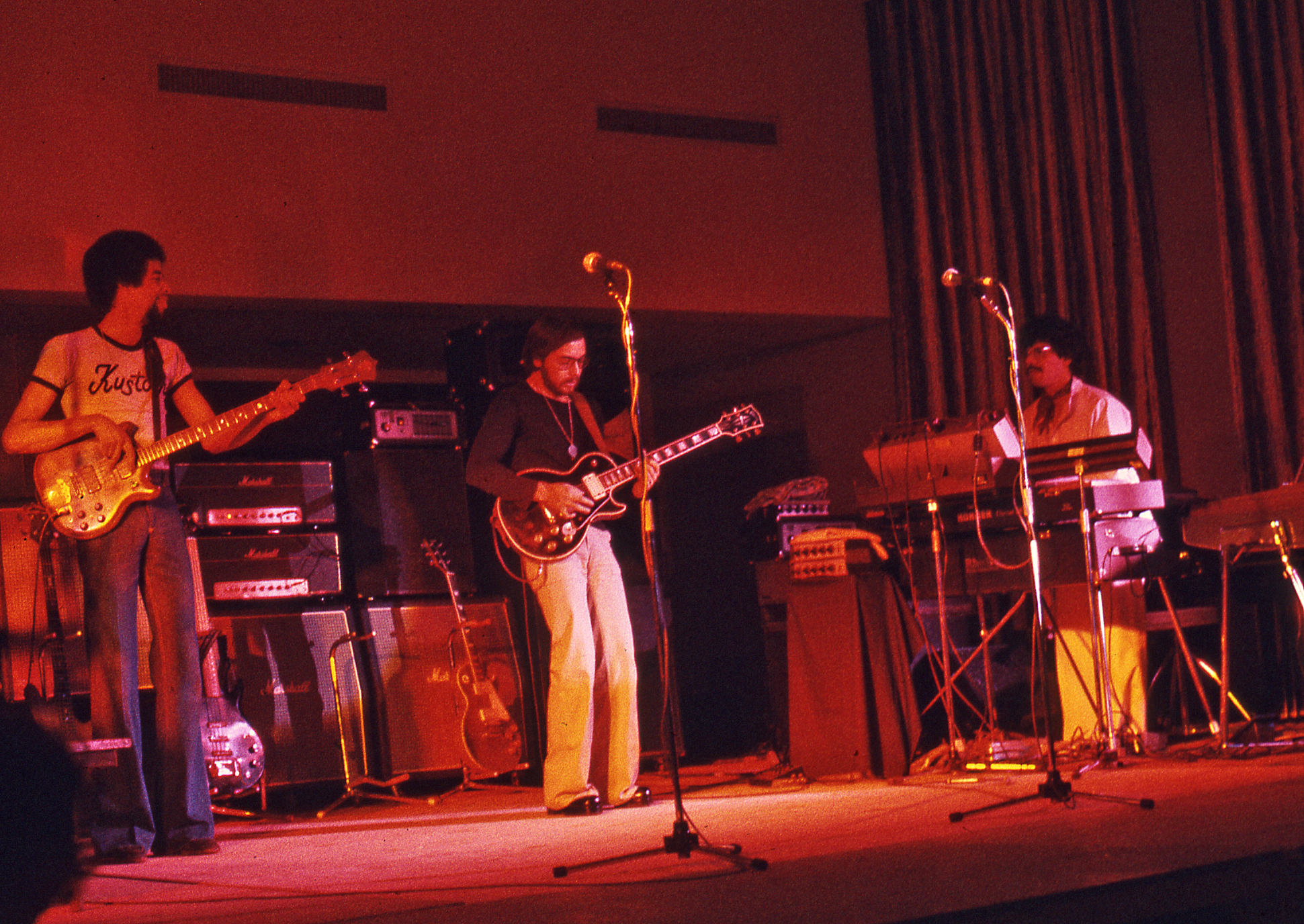
L to R: Stanley Clarke, Al Di Meola, Chick Corea (drummer Lenny White not visible). Return to Forever performing in 1974 at Onondaga Community College in Syracuse, New York.

After the second album, Farrell, Purim and Moreira left the group to form their own bands, and guitarist Bill Connors, drummer Steve Gadd and percussionist Mingo Lewis were added. However, Gadd was unwilling to tour with the band and risk his job as an in-demand session drummer. Lenny White (who had played with Corea in Miles Davis's band) replaced Gadd and Lewis on drums and percussion, and the group's third album, Hymn of the Seventh Galaxy (1973), was then re-recorded (the first recording, featuring Gadd on drums, was never released and has since disappeared).

The nature of the group's music had by now completely changed into jazz-rock, or jazz fusion, and had evolved into a similar vein to that which the Mahavishnu Orchestra, Weather Report, and some progressive rock bands were performing at the time. Their music was still melodic and incorporated strong themes. And while the music had a strong, rock oriented approach, it was elevated by the jazz elements of strong, instrumental improvisation and modulating harmonic and rhythmic structures. Over-driven, distorted guitar had also become prominent in the band's new sound, and Clarke had by then switched almost completely to the electric bass. A replacement on vocals was not hired, and all the songs were now instrumentals. This change did not lead to a decrease in the band's commercial fortunes however, Return to Forever's jazz rock albums instead found their way onto US pop album charts.

In the September 1988 DownBeat magazine interview with Chick Corea by Josef Woodward, Josef says (page 19), "There is this general view ... that ... Miles [Davis] crystallized electric jazz fusion and that he sent his emissaries out." Chick responds, "Nah, that's Disneyland. Miles is definitely a leader ... But there were other things that occurred that I thought were equally as important. What John McLaughlin did with the electric guitar set the world on its ear. No one ever heard an electric guitar played like that before, and it certainly inspired me. ... John's band, more than my experience with Miles, led me to want to turn the volume up and write music that was more dramatic and made your hair move."

While their second jazz rock album, Where Have I Known You Before (1974) was similar in style to its immediate predecessor, Corea now played synthesizers in addition to electric keyboards (including piano), and Clarke's playing had evolved considerably- now using flange and fuzz-tone effects, and with his signature style beginning to emerge. After Bill Connors left the band to concentrate on his solo career, the group also hired new guitarists. Although Earl Klugh played guitar for some of the group's live performances, he was soon replaced by the then 19-year-old guitar prodigy Al Di Meola, who had also played on the album recording sessions.

Their following album, No Mystery (1975), was recorded with the same line-up as Where Have I Known You Before, but the style of music had become more varied. The first side of the record consisted primarily of jazz-funk, while the second side featured Corea's acoustic title track and a long composition with a strong Spanish influence. On this and the following album, each member of the group composed at least one of the tracks. No Mystery went on to win the Grammy Award for Best Jazz Performance by a Group.

The final album by this longest-lasting "classic" lineup of the group, which had by this time left Polydor for Columbia Records, was Romantic Warrior (1976), the best selling of all Return to Forever's efforts, eventually reaching gold disc status. Romantic Warrior continued their experiments in the realms of jazz-rock and related musical genres, and was lauded by critics for both the technically demanding style of its compositions as well as for its accomplished musicianship.

After the release of Romantic Warrior and Return to Forever's subsequent tour in support (as well as having in addition signed a multimillion-dollar contract with CBS), Corea shocked Clarke by deciding to change the lineup of the group and to not include either White or Di Meola.

=== Final album (1977) ===
The final incarnation of Return to Forever featured Corea, Clarke and Joe Farrell as well as a four-piece horn section and Corea's wife Gayle Moran on vocals, but recorded only one studio album, Musicmagic (1977).

In 1978, after issuing a live album of the tour titled Return to Forever Live: The Complete Concert (a four-LP set, also released in edited form as a single LP and later as a double CD), Chick Corea officially disbanded the group.

=== Reunions ===
In 1982, the Corea/Clarke/White/Di Meola lineup reunited to record a ten-minute track, "Compadres", which was issued on Corea's 1982 album Touchstone. Also, they played at The Wolf & Rissmiller's Country Club, Reseda, California, with Joe Henderson on April 7, 1982.

In 1983, the same Return to Forever lineup played a short reunion tour of the U.S. and Japan, and the live recording in Japan was released in 2021. The repertoire for the tour included some new material by Corea, including one piece titled "Overture" that was later recorded by the Chick Corea Elektric Band for the live various artists double album GRP Super Live in Concert (1992), and another titled "The Phantom" that Di Meola later recorded on his album Kiss My Axe (1991).

Twenty-six years later, Corea, Clarke, White, and Di Meola reunited a second time for a tour of the United States and Europe that began in the summer of 2008. A boxed set of remixed and digitally remastered tracks from the albums Hymn of the Seventh Galaxy, Where Have I Known You Before, No Mystery, and Romantic Warrior was released to coincide with the tour.

Corea, Clarke, and White (minus Di Meola) performed an acoustic tour in 2009 and released a live album in 2011 titled Forever. It included guest appearances by Bill Connors, Chaka Khan, and Jean-Luc Ponty.

In February 2011 the group began a world tour in Australia. The lineup for this tour was Corea, Clarke, White, Ponty, and guitarist Frank Gambale of the Chick Corea Elektric Band. Many dates included Dweezil Zappa's Zappa Plays Zappa band as an opening act with Corea occasionally appearing in Zappa's band on keyboards, as well as Jean-Luc Ponty performing some of the songs that he had performed with Frank Zappa.

Corea died of cancer on February 9, 2021.

== Discography ==
=== Studio albums ===
Year	Album	Peak chart positions			Certifications	Labels	Note
Year	Album	US Pop	US Jazz	US R&B	Certifications	Labels	Note
1972	Return to Forever	—	8	—		ECM	Credited as a Chick Corea solo album
1973	Light as a Feather	—	6	—		Polydor	Credited as "Chick Corea and Return to Forever"
1973	Hymn of the Seventh Galaxy	124	7	—		Polydor	
1974	Where Have I Known You Before	32	5	—		Polydor	
1975	No Mystery	39	7	—		Polydor	
1976	Romantic Warrior	35	3	23	US: Gold	Columbia	
1977	Musicmagic	38	4	—		Columbia	
"—" denotes releases that did not chart or were not released in that country.

=== Live albums ===
Year	Album	Peak chart positions		Certifications	Labels	Note
Year	Album	US Pop	US Jazz	Certifications	Labels	Note
1978	Live	155	12		Columbia	Live 1977 at Palladium (New York City) [4LP, 2CD, 3CD]
2009	Returns	—	—		Eagle	Live 2008 at 3 venues ( Montreux Jazz Festival, Ruth Eckerd Hall and Bank of America Pavilion) [2CD, DVD-Video]
2011	Forever	—	—		Eagle	Credited as Chick Corea, Stanley Clarke and Lenny White. Live 2009 at 4 venues (Yoshi's, Monterey Jazz Festival, Blue Note Tokyo and Dimitriou's Jazz Alley. [2CD]
2012	The Mothership Returns	—	—		Eagle	Live 2011 at 2 venues (Austin and Montreux) [2CD + DVD-Video]
2021	Together Again: Live in Japan 1983	—	—		Hi Hat	[CD]
"—" denotes releases that did not chart or were not released in that country.

=== Compilations ===
- The Best of Return to Forever (Columbia, 1980)
- Return to Forever (CBS/Sony, 1981) [Cassette]
- Return to the Seventh Galaxy: The Anthology (Verve, 1996) – includes previously unreleased 4 live tracks
- This Is Jazz 12 - Return to Forever (Columbia, 1996)
- Return to Forever: The Anthology (Concord, 2008)
- The Definitive Collection (Verve, 2008)

== Personnel ==
All members

- Chick Corea – keyboards, synthesizers (1972–1977, 1983, 2008–2021; died 2021)
- Stanley Clarke – bass (1972–1977, 1983, 2008–2021), vocals (1977)
- Joe Farrell – saxophone (1972–1973, 1977; died 1986)
- Airto Moreira – drums, percussion (1972–1973)
- Flora Purim – vocals (1972–1973)
- Lenny White – drums (1973–1976, 1983, 2008, 2010–2021)
- Bill Connors – guitar (1973–1974, 2009)
- Steve Gadd – drums (1973)
- Mingo Lewis – percussion (1973)
- Earl Klugh – guitar (1974)
- Al Di Meola – guitar (1974–1976, 1983, 2008)
- Gerry Brown – drums (1977)
- Harold Garrett – trombone (1977)
- Gayle Moran – vocals, keyboards (1977)
- James E. Pugh – trombone (1977)
- John Thomas – trumpet (1977)
- James Tinsley – trumpet (1977)
- Ron Moss – trombone (1977)
- Jean-Luc Ponty – violin (2009–2021)
- Frank Gambale – guitar (2010–2021)

=== Lineups ===
1972–1973	1973	1973–1974	1974
Chick Corea – electric piano; Stanley Clarke – double bass; Joe Farrell – saxophone; Airto Moreira – percussion; Flora Purim – vocals	Chick Corea – electric piano; Stanley Clarke – bass; Bill Connors – guitar; Steve Gadd – drums; Mingo Lewis – percussion	Chick Corea – keyboards; Stanley Clarke – bass; Bill Connors – guitar; Lenny White – drums	Chick Corea – keyboards; Stanley Clarke – bass; Lenny White – drums; Earl Klugh – guitar
1974–1977	1977	1977	1977–1983
Chick Corea – keyboards, synthesizers; Stanley Clarke – bass; Lenny White – drums; Al Di Meola – guitar	Chick Corea – keyboards, synthesizers; Stanley Clarke – bass; Gerry Brown – drums; Joe Farrell – saxophone; Harold Garrett – trombone; Gayle Moran – vocals, keyboards; James E. Pugh – trombone; John Thomas – trumpet; James Tinsley – trumpet	Chick Corea – keyboards, synthesizers; Stanley Clarke – bass; Gerry Brown – drums; Joe Farrell – saxophone; Harold Garrett – trombone; Gayle Moran – vocals, keyboards; James E. Pugh – trombone; John Thomas – trumpet; James Tinsley – trumpet; Ron Moss – trombone	Disbanded
1983	1983–2008	2008	2009
Chick Corea – keyboards; Stanley Clarke – bass; Al Di Meola – guitar; Lenny White – drums	Disbanded	Chick Corea – keyboards; Stanley Clarke – bass; Al Di Meola – guitar; Lenny White – drums	Chick Corea – keyboards; Stanley Clarke – bass; Lenny White – drums; Jean-Luc Ponty – violin; Bill Connors – guitar; Chaka Khan – vocals
2010–2021
Chick Corea – keyboards; Stanley Clarke – bass; Lenny White – drums; Jean-Luc Ponty – violin; Frank Gambale – guitar
