= No Mystery =

Studio album by Return to Forever
- Released: February 1975
- Recorded: January 1975
- Studio: Record Plant Studios, New York City
- Genre: Jazz fusion, progressive rock, latin jazz
- Length: 42:57
- Label: Polydor
- Producer: Chick Corea, Shelly Yakus

Return to Forever chronology
Where Have I Known You Before (1974)	No Mystery (1975)	Romantic Warrior (1976)

Chick Corea chronology
Where Have I Known You Before (1974)	No Mystery (1975)	Circling In (1975)

Professional ratings
Review scores
Source	Rating
AllMusic	3.5/5 stars
Sputnikmusic	4.6/5 stars
The Rolling Stone Jazz Record Guide	2/5 stars

No Mystery (1975) is a studio album by jazz-rock fusion band Return to Forever, and the second featuring the quartet of Chick Corea, guitarist Al Di Meola, bassist Stanley Clarke and drummer Lenny White.

== Production ==
All members of the group contributed compositions to this album. Side 1 contains heavily funk-influenced material composed by each member of the group, whereas Side 2 is filled by Chick Corea compositions. Chick Corea won the Grammy Award for Best Instrumental Jazz Performance, Individual or Group Grammy Award in 1975 for this album.

== Track listing ==
Side one
No.	Title	Writer(s)	Length
1.	"Dayride"	Stanley Clarke	3:25
2.	"Jungle Waterfall"	Chick Corea, Clarke	3:03
3.	"Flight of the Newborn"	Al Di Meola	7:23
4.	"Sofistifunk"	Lenny White	3:51
5.	"Excerpt from the First Movement of Heavy Metal"	Corea, Clarke, White, Di Meola	2:45

Side two
No.	Title	Writer(s)	Length
6.	"No Mystery"	Corea	6:10
7.	"Interplay"	Corea, Clarke	2:15
8.	"Celebration Suite, part I"	Corea	8:27
9.	"Celebration Suite, part II"	Corea	5:32
Total length:			42:57

== Personnel ==
Return to Forever

- Chick Corea – acoustic piano, Fender Rhodes electric piano, Hohner clavinet, Yamaha electric organ, synthesizers (ARP Odyssey, Minimoog), snare drum, marimba, vocals
- Al Di Meola – electric guitar, acoustic guitar
- Stanley Clarke – electric bass, acoustic bass, Yamaha electric organ, synthesizer, vocals
- Lenny White – drums, percussion, congas, marimba

Production

- Shelly Yakus – engineer
- Tom Rabstenek – mastering
- Bill Levy – cover art direction

== Chart performance ==
Year	Chart	Position
1975	Billboard 200	39
1975	Billboard Jazz Albums	7
