= Romantic Warrior =

1976 album by Return to Forever

Studio album by Return to Forever
- Released: 1976
- Recorded: February 1976
- Studio: Caribou Ranch (Nederland, Colorado, US)
- Genre: Jazz fusion, progressive rock
- Length: 45:28
- Label: Columbia
- Producer: Chick Corea

Return to Forever chronology
| No Mystery (1975) | Romantic Warrior (1976) | Musicmagic (1977) |

Chick Corea chronology
| The Leprechaun (1976) | Romantic Warrior (1976) | My Spanish Heart (1976) |

Romantic Warrior is a studio album by the American jazz fusion band Return to Forever, their first recorded for Columbia Records, after releasing their previous four albums on Polydor. In February 1976, the group retreated to Caribou Ranch near Nederland, Colorado to record. It was the first album to remove the "featuring Chick Corea" credit from beside the band name on the album cover.

== Production ==
=== Recording ===
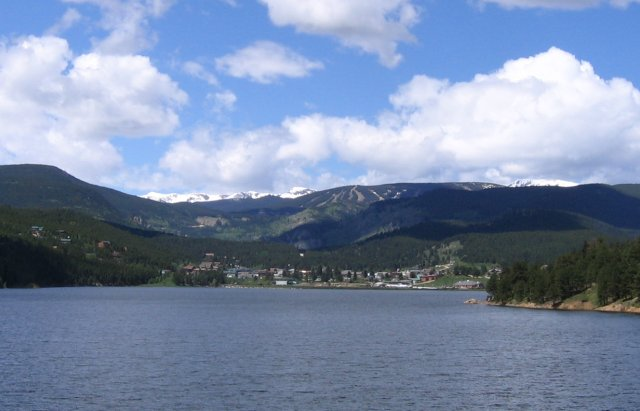
The album was recorded in a ranch located near the town of Nederland, Colorado (pictured in 2005)

Romantic Warrior was recorded in February 1976 at Caribou Ranch, located near Nederland, Colorado.

=== Music ===
The album, as a whole, has been considered Chick Corea's answer to Rick Wakeman's successful The Myths and Legends of King Arthur and the Knights of the Round Table (1975), either by its medieval themes or its prog rock leanings.

Chick Corea contributed the longest compositions while the other members each composed one piece. The opener, "Medieval Overture", with its distinctive melodic motifs, sets the mood for the rest of the album. Lenny White's "Sorceress" starts with a funky riff and is distinguished by Corea's synthesizers. The title track, "The Romantic Warrior", is fully acoustic. It has a long intro, which is followed by a short theme consisting of one riff. Each group member, excluding White, plays a long solo. An extended outro follows, during which fast unison patterns are heard.

On side two, Al Di Meola's song, "Majestic Dance", relies on rock riffs and distorted lead guitar sound, and features fast harpsichord-like synth figures. Clarke's "The Magician" is a complex composition, featuring playful melodies, and rapid unison lines. The last track of the album is Corea's "Duel of the Jester and the Tyrant", the longest song on the album. It has a more conventional melody as a main theme, but follows the style of previous tracks. Notable is the intense keyboard solo showcasing Corea.

After this album Corea decided that the group's time had come to an end and he continued with a new Return to Forever line-up with Clarke. Corea dedicated the album to the founder of the Church of Scientology, L. Ron Hubbard.

== Critical reception ==
Professional ratings
Retrospective reviews
Review scores
| Source | Rating |
|---|---|
| AllMusic | 4/5 stars |
| The Rolling Stone Jazz Record Guide | 4/5 stars |
| The Penguin Guide to Jazz Recordings | 3/4 stars |
| All About Jazz | 5/5 stars |

In a retrospective review for AllMusic, William Ruhlmann praised Romantic Warrior as "the sound of a mature band at the top of its game, which may help explain why it was Return to Forever's most popular album, eventually certified as a gold record, and the last by this assemblage." In another retrospective review for Sputnikmusic, Brendan Schroer argued that the "true magic of the collective’s work was in how these musicians could work off each other and make something both emotionally resonant and musically abstruse" and opined that "Romantic Warrior plays out as a wonderful - if slightly flawed - melding of incredible technical feats and inner-band chemistry".

John W. Patterson of All About Jazz praised the album saying "Amazingly, this release was 100% cohesive, like movements of varying force in one stream of thought. Nothing was lacking, nothing was excess, Romantic Warrior remains to this day, a diamond, exuding flawless beauty. Yes, it grew out of the jazz rock fusion genre but it's fine art that outlives its hey day, an example of just how incredibly wonderful fusion can be." Romantic Warrior was also certified Gold in the US by the RIAA on May 24, 1990.

== Chart performance ==
| Year | Chart | Position |
|---|---|---|
| 1976 | Billboard 200 | 35 |
| 1976 | Billboard Jazz Albums | 3 |
| 1976 | Billboard R&B Albums | 23 |

== Track listing ==
Side one
| No. | Title | Writer(s) | Length |
|---|---|---|---|
| 1. | "Medieval Overture" | Chick Corea | 5:14 |
| 2. | "Sorceress" | Lenny White | 7:34 |
| 3. | "The Romantic Warrior" | Corea | 10:52 |

Side two
| No. | Title | Writer(s) | Length |
|---|---|---|---|
| 4. | "Majestic Dance" | Al Di Meola | 5:01 |
| 5. | "The Magician" | Stanley Clarke | 5:29 |
| 6. | "Duel of the Jester and the Tyrant (Parts I and II)" | Corea | 11:26 |
| Total length: | | | 45:28 |

== Personnel ==
Return to Forever

- Chick Corea – acoustic piano, Fender Rhodes electric piano, Hohner Clavinet, Yamaha YC45d organ, synthesizers (ARP Odyssey, Micromoog, Minimoog, Moog 15 modular, Polymoog), marimba, percussion
- Al Di Meola – electric guitars, acoustic guitar, soprano guitar, handbells, slide whistle
- Stanley Clarke – Alembic electric bass with Instant Flanger, piccolo bass, acoustic bass, bell tree, handbells
- Lenny White – drums, timpani, congas, timbales, snare drums, suspended cymbals, alarm clock, handbells

Production

- Chick Corea – producer
- Al Di Meola – assistant producer
- Stanley Clarke – assistant producer
- Lenny White – assistant producer
- Dennis MacKay – recording engineer, remixing
- Tom Likes – assistant engineer
- Wilson McLean – cover art
- Gerard Huerta – logo
