= 'Nard =

Studio album by Bernard Wright
- Released: 1981
- Recorded: 1980
- Studio: A & R Studios (New York City, New York)
- Genres: Jazz fusion; funk
- Length: 41:07
- Labels: GRP; Arista
- Producers: Dave Grusin; Larry Rosen

Bernard Wright chronology
'Nard (1981)	Funky Beat (1983)

Professional ratings
Review scores
Source	Rating
Allmusic	4/5 stars

'Nard is the debut album from American funk keyboardist Bernard Wright. It was released in 1981 by GRP Records and distributed by Arista Records. The album reached number 7 on the Jazz Albums chart in the US.

== Track listing ==
No.	Title	Writer(s)	Length
1.	"Master Rocker"	Bernard Wright; Weldon Irvine; Ronnie Miller	3:16
2.	"Firebolt Hustle"	Harold Grate; Henry Grate	4:11
3.	"Haboglabotribin'"	Don Blackman	4:19
4.	"Spinnin'"	Al Flythe	5:34
5.	"Just Chillin' Out"	Wright; Marcus Miller; Barry Johnson; Flythe	4:35
6.	"Bread Sandwiches"	Wright; Steve Teele; Denzel Miller	3:52
7.	"Music is the Key"	Irvine; Tommy Smith	4:55
8.	"We're Just the Band"	Henry Grate	3:03
9.	"Solar"	Miles Davis	7:18

== Personnel ==
- Bernard Wright – keyboards, synthesizer, piano, melodica, vocals

Band

- Bobby Broom – guitars
- Kevin Oliver – guitars
- Ronald Miller – guitars
- Don Blackman – piano
- Barry "Sonjon" Johnson – bass guitar
- Marcus Miller – bass guitar
- Steve Teele – bass guitar
- Buddy Williams – drums
- Charley Drayton – drums
- Dennis Chambers – drums
- Howard Grate – drums
- Michael Flythe - drums
- Al "Wink" Flythe – sax
- Errol "Crusher" Bennett – percussion
- Jimmy Owens – horn arrangements
- Desirè White – backing vocals
- Luther Vandross – backing vocals
- Patti Austin – backing vocals
- Sheri Snyder – backing vocals

== Charts ==
=== Weekly charts ===
Chart (1981)	Peak position
Billboard Pop Albums	116
Billboard Top Soul Albums	23
Billboard Top Jazz Albums	7

=== Singles ===
Year	Single	Chart positions
Year	Single	US Dance
1982	"Just Chillin' Out"	85

== In popular culture ==
The song "Haboglabotribin" is featured in Grand Theft Auto V on the radio station Space 103.2. The song is also featured in the trailer for the Enhanced Edition of the game, which was shown during Sony's PlayStation 5 reveal event.

== Samples ==
Yo Yo featuring Ice Cube sampled "Master Rocker" on their song "The Bonnie and Clyde Theme" on their album You Better Ask Somebody in 1993, and Skee-Lo sampled "Spinnin'" on his song "I Wish" on his album I Wish in 1995. Snoop Doggy Dogg also sampled "Haboglabotribin" on the track "Gz & Hustlas" on the 1993 Doggystyle album. Seagram also sampled "Haboglabotribin" on his song "The Town" on his 1994 album Reality Check.
