= Peanut Butter (Twennynine song) =

- Japanese release picture sleeve

Single by Twennynine

from the album Best of Friends
- B-side: "Oh, Slyvie"
- Released: 1979
- Genre: Funk; R&B
- Length: 3:37
- Label: Elektra
- Songwriter: Donald Blackman
- Producers: Lenny White, Larry Dunn

Twennynine singles chronology
"Peanut Butter" (1979)	"Best of Friends" (1980)

"Peanut Butter" is a song by funk/r&b band Twennynine, released in 1979 on Elektra Records as the first single from their debut album, Best of Friends. The song peaked at No. 3 on the US Billboard Hot R&B Singles chart and No. 83 on the main Hot 100 Charts.

== Critical reception ==
Allmusic's Alex Henderson, in his review of Best of Friends, called Peanut Butter a "goofy funk smoker".
