= Don Blackman =

- Born: September 1, 1953; Jamaica, Queens, New York, U.S.
- Died: April 11, 2013 (aged 59) New York City
- Genres: Jazz, funk, R&B, soul
- Occupations: Singer, songwriter, pianist
- Instruments: Piano, vocals
- Labels: Arista, RCA

Don (Donald) Blackman (September 1, 1953 – April 11, 2013) was an American jazz-funk pianist, singer, and songwriter. He performed with Parliament-Funkadelic, Lenny White, Marcus Miller, Sting, Mary J. Blige, Earth, Wind and Fire and Louis Hayes.

== Biography ==
Blackman was born and raised in Jamaica, Queens, NY. A childhood neighbor was Charles McPherson, and while still a teenager he played in McPherson's ensemble with Sam Jones and Louis Hayes. At the beginning of the 1970s, he played with Parliament/Funkadelic, Earth, Wind and Fire, and Roy Ayers, before becoming a member of Lenny White's group Twennynine, for whom he penned songs such as "Peanut Butter" and "Morning Sunrise". He released his self-titled debut solo album in 1982 on Arista Records, including the songs "Holding You, Loving You", "Heart's Desire" and "Since You've Been Away So Long" that became major hits in Europe.

Blackman also worked as a session musician, appearing on albums by Kurtis Blow (Kingdom Blow), Bernard Wright, Najee, David Sanborn, Lenny White, Roy Ayers, Sting (Brand New Day), World Saxophone Quartet, Janet Jackson's "That's the Way Love Goes" (Remix) and Wayman Tisdale. He wrote the composition "Haboglabotribin", which appeared on Bernard Wright's album Nard and was sampled by Snoop Dogg in the song "G'z and Hustlaz", Tupac Shakur's album R U Still Down? (Remember Me), and is a featured song in the video game Grand Theft Auto V. Other works include "Morning Sunrise" written and performed by Don Blackman that appears on both Weldon Irvine's album "The Sisters" and Twennynine's album "Best of Friends". It was sampled on the track "Dear Summer" for Memphis Bleek's album 534 featuring Jay-Z, and "Holding You, Loving You", which appeared on Master P.'s album I Got The Hook Up.

On television, he scored and wrote music for commercials, TV shows, and movies, appearing on Fox Network's New York Undercover, producing and writing the theme song for Nickelodeon's show "Gullah Gullah Island", as well as producing songs for the MTV Network movie Joe's Apartment.

== Death ==
Don Blackman died, aged 59, from cancer, on April 11, 2013. Blackman is survived by his son Kyle Blackman, who is a DJ in New York, NY, and daughter, jazz-funk singer Irene Blackman, who toured with Blackman throughout the years.

== Discography ==
- Don Blackman (Arista Records, 1982)
- Listen (Expansion UK, 2002)

With C. I. Williams

- When Alto Was King (Mapleshade, 1997)

With Lenny White

- Presents The Adventures Of Astral Pirates (Elektra – 6E-121, 1978)
- Streamline (Elektra – 6E-164, 1978)
- Best of Friends (Elektra – 6E-223, 1979)
- Twennynine with Lenny White (Elektra – 6E-304, 1980)

== Sources ==
- Don Blackman at Allmusic
