= List of Earth, Wind & Fire tribute albums =

This is a list of tribute albums of the American R&B band, Earth, Wind & Fire.

Title	Artist(s)	Released
The Love Has Never Gone: Tribute to Earth, Wind & Fire	The Lenny White Project	2004
Smooth Sax Tribute to Earth, Wind and Fire	Various Artists	2004
Devoted Spirits: A Tribute to Earth Wind and Fire	Devoted Spirits	2004
Interpretations: Celebrating The Music Of Earth, Wind & Fire	Various Artists	2007
