= Present Tense (Lenny White album) =

Studio album by Lenny White
- Released: 1995
- Studio: Ambient Recording Studio, Stamford, Connecticut; Camel Island, L.A; House Of Music, Orange, New Jersey; Stagg Street Studios, Van Nuys, California
- Genre: Jazz fusion; jazz-funk
- Length: 1:12:04
- Label: Hip Bop
- Producer: Yusuf Ghandi; Lenny White

Lenny White chronology
In Clinic (1983)	Present Tense (1995)	Renderers of Spirit (1996)

Present Tense is the third studio album by drummer Lenny White, released in 1995 by Hip Bop Records. The album reached No. 23 on the US Billboard Top Contemporary Jazz albums chart and No. 36 on the Billboard Top Jazz Albums chart.

== Background ==
Artists such as Chaka Khan, Marcus Miller, Kenny Garett, Chick Corea and Stanley Clarke make guest appearances on Present Tense.

White covered The Police's "Tea in the Sahara" and Bernard Wright's "Who Do You Love" on the album.

== Critical reception ==
Professional ratings
Review scores
Source	Rating
AllMusic	3/5 stars
Bass Player	A

Tim Sheridan of AllMusic described White's music as a laid-back fusion of jazz and funk, perfect for casual settings, but lacking in intensity. The album was a "critic's choice" in Billboard, with the reviewers saying it "is sure to please fusion lovers, quality-minded R&B aficionados, and mature hip-hoppers". The Washington Post's Mike Joyce concluded the album "has a lot more going for it than its obvious surface appeal". Bass Player Chris Jisi called it "one of the best bass albums of the year".

== Track listing ==
No.	Title	Writer(s)	Length
1.	"Thick"	Lenny White	6:03
2.	"East St. Louis"	Lenny White, Charles W. Groce III	6:25
3.	"Who You Love"	Lenny White, Bernard Wright	4:56
4.	"Door #3"	Jane Getter, Lenny White	4:53
5.	"Sweet Tooth"	Victor Bailey	5:51
6.	"Wolfbane"	Lenny White	6:26
7.	"Tea in the Sahara"	Sting	5:06
8.	"Dark"	Lenny White, Tony Purrone	6:10
9.	"And Then You'll Know"	Jane Getter, Lenny White	5:27
10.	"By Any Means Necessary"	Candy Bell, Jean McClain, Lenny White, Tina Harris	5:06
11.	"Two Weeks In Another Town"	Lenny White	6:29
12.	"Shadow Of Lo"	Lenny White	5:25
13.	"Caprice"	Chick Corea	3:41
