= Shades (Shades album) =

Studio album by Shades
- Released: July 15, 1997
- Genre: R&B
- Length: 53:29
- Label: Motown
- Producers: Andre Harrell; Chad Elliott; Edward Ferrell; Lewis Tillman (exec.)

Singles from Shades
- 1. "Tell Me (I'll Be Around)" Released: June 25, 1996; 2. "Serenade" Released: May 20, 1997; 3. "I Believe" Released: 1997

Professional ratings
Review scores
Source	Rating
AllMusic	3/5 stars

Shades is the only studio album by American contemporary R&B group Shades, released July 15, 1997 via Motown Records. The album did not chart in the United States; however, the first two singles, "Tell Me (I'll Be Around)" and "Serenade", peaked at #50 and #88 on the Billboard Hot 100, respectively.

In addition to original material, the album contains covers of two songs: "How Deep Is Your Love", originally performed by Bee Gees; and "Time Will Reveal", originally performed by DeBarge.

== Track listing ==
No.	Title	Writer(s)	Producer(s)	Length
1.	"Who Are You"	Danielle Andrews; Charles Farrar; James Earl Jones, Jr.; Monique Peoples; Troy Taylor	Charles Farrar; Troy Taylor	3:17
2.	"Eventually"	London D. Jones; Christopher "Tricky" Stewart; Sean K. Hall	London D. Jones; Christopher "Tricky" Stewart; Sean K. Hall	4:51
3.	"Serenade" (^{A})	Darrell Allamby; Danielle Andrews; Gary Kemp; Billy Lawrence; Monique Peoples; Shannon Walker Williams; Tiffanie Cardwell	Darrell Allamby	4:05
4.	"What Would You Do"	Armando Colon; Rashad Smith	Armando Colon	4:12
5.	"Why"	Chad Elliott; Missy Elliott	Al West; Chad Elliott	3:29
6.	"Love Never Dies"	Latrece Barney; Chad Elliott; Tara Geter-Tillman	Al West; Chad Elliott	3:38
7.	"Tell Me (I'll Be Around)" (^{B})	Danielle Andrews; Charles Farrar; Monique Peoples; Troy Taylor; Bernard Wright; Lenny Wright; Shannon Walker Williams; Tiffanie Cardwell	Charles Farrar; Troy Taylor	4:51
8.	"Last to Know"	Chad Elliott; Tara Geter-Tillman	Al West; Chad Elliott	3:28
9.	"Every Time (I Think of You)" (^{C})	Ewart Dewgarde; Walt Dewgarde; Edward Ferrell; Darrell Yates, Jr.; Terri Robinson; Tekomin Williams; Jack K. McNair; Mook Daddy	Edward Ferrell; Mook Daddy	4:04
10.	"I Believe"	Danielle Andrews; Charles Farrar; Monique Peoples; Troy Taylor	Charles Farrar; Troy Taylor; Chad Elliott	3:37
11.	"How Deep Is Your Love" (Bee Gees cover)	Barry, Robin & Maurice Gibb	Charles Farrar; Troy Taylor	5:11
12.	"I Believe" (Remix (featuring Aqil Davidson and Nutta Butta)^{D})	Danielle Andrews; Charles Farrar; Monique Peoples; Troy Taylor; Isaac Hayes; Shannon Walker Williams; Tiffanie Cardwell	Sprague "Doogie" Williams	4:28
13.	"Time Will Reveal" (DeBarge cover)	Eldra Debarge; Etterlene Jordan	Charles Farrar; Troy Taylor	5:11
Total length:				53:59

== Samples ==
A. Contains a sample of "True" by Spandau Ballet.
B. Contains a sample of "Who Do You Love" by Bernard Wright.
C. Contains a sample of "Sound Bwoy Bureill" by Smif-n-Wessun.
D. Contains a sample of "Ike's Mood" by Isaac Hayes.
