= Walter Kahn =

American DJ and record producer

Walter B. "Kandor" Kahn (April 9, 1948 – June 15, 2013) was an American DJ and record producer.

Born in Philadelphia, Kahn graduated from Harriton High School in 1966 and earned a degree in radio, television and film from Temple University in 1970. He has lived in Merion Station, Society Hill and Queen Village, Philadelphia, as well as Los Angeles and Clearwater, Florida. Kahn began his music career as a Top 40 radio DJ/announcer and recording engineer. His early music productions include "Loves Me Like A Rock", written by Paul Simon, performed by The Dixie Hummingbirds, and released on ABC Records. In 1974, he was awarded a Grammy for producing that recording. In 1978, he was executive producer of "Hot Shot" by Karen Young, which reached #1 on Billboard Magazine's Top Dance Singles chart. He produced for artists at ABC, Atlantic, CBS, Casablanca, MGM, PolyGram, RCA and Warner Bros.

In 1992, Kahn produced The Movement's single "Jump!", which was released on his L.A.-based Sunshine Records. It reached #1 on the Billboard Top Dance Singles chart and #53 on the Billboard Hot 100 Singles chart. The song also went Top 10 in Australia, where it spent more than six months on the chart. Kahn entered into a deal with Arista Records in New York to distribute the single and the subsequent album, which he also produced. Kahn's music is heard in more than twenty films and TV shows.

In 1995, Kahn produced "I Wish" by rapper Skee-Lo, along with a follow-up album of the same name. Kahn was nominated for a Grammy Award for "Best Rap Album" for I Wish.

Kahn died in his home at Clearwater, Florida in June 2013, of kidney failure.
