= Big City (Lenny White album) =

Studio album by Lenny White
- Released: 1977
- Genres: Jazz fusion, jazz-funk, jazz
- Length: 37:27
- Label: Nemperor
- Producers: Lenny White, Pat Gleeson

Lenny White chronology
Venusian Summer (1976)	Big City (1977)	The Adventures of Astral Pirates (1978)

Big City is the second studio album by drummer Lenny White, released in 1977 by Nemperor Records. This album peaked at No. 17 on the US Billboard Top Jazz LPs chart.

== Background ==
Big City was produced by Lenny White and Pat Gleeson. Artists such as Marcus Miller, Tower of Power's Mic Gillette, Herbie Hancock and Verdine White of Earth, Wind & Fire appear on the album.

== Critical reception ==
Professional ratings
Review scores
Source	Rating
AllMusic	2.5/5 stars

Robert Gabriel of AllMusic wrote "On his second solo album, Big City, Return to Forever drummer Lenny White leads an all-star cast on a jaunt through the diverse worlds of jazz fusion."

== Track listing ==
No.	Title	Length
1.	"Big City"	5:22
2.	"Sweet Dreamer"	4:42
3.	"Egypt" (Interludes)	1:00
4.	"Nocturne" (Interludes)	1:24
5.	"Rapid Transit"	3:59
6.	"Ritmo Loco"	1:08
7.	"Dreams Come and Go Away?"	3:34
8.	"Prelude" (Enchanted Pool Suite)	1:31
9.	"Part I" (Enchanted Pool Suite)	2:18
10.	"Part II" (Enchanted Pool Suite)	5:39
11.	"And We Meet Again"	6:41
