= Money Train (soundtrack) =

Money Train: Music from the Motion Picture

Soundtrack album to Money Train by various artists
- Released: November 21, 1995
- Recorded: 1995
- Genre: Urban
- Length: 58:07
- Label: 550 Music; Epic Soundtrax
- Producer: Alex Richbourg; B Laidback; Cory Rooney; Dave "Jam" Hall; Heavy D; Jimmy Jam and Terry Lewis; Larry Hamby; Mark Mancina; Mike Smoov; Poke; Prince Markie Dee; Puff Daddy; Robert Livingston; Skee-Lo; Sting International; Teddy Riley; Tim & Bob; Walter Kahn

Singles from Money Train
- 1. "Top of the Stairs" Released: 1995; 2. "The Train Is Coming (Money Train Remix)" Released: 1996

Professional ratings
Review scores
Source	Rating
AllMusic	3/5 stars

Money Train: Music from the Motion Picture is the soundtrack album to Joseph Ruben's 1995 action comedy film Money Train. It was released on November 21, 1995, through Epic Soundtrax and 550 Music.

Production was handled by Alex Richbourg, B Laidback, Cory Rooney, Dave "Jam" Hall, Heavy D, Jimmy Jam and Terry Lewis, Larry Hamby, Mark Mancina, Mike Smoov, Poke, Prince Markie Dee, Puff Daddy, Robert Livingston, Skee-Lo, Sting International, Teddy Riley, Tim & Bob and Walter Kahn, with Joe Ruben, Jon Peters, Michael Dilbeck, Ron Sweeney and Tracy Barone serving as executive producers.

The album features contributions from 112, 4.0, Assorted Phlavors, Ken Boothe, Luther Vandross, Mark Mancina, Men of Vizion, Patra, Shaggy, Skee-Lo, Terri & Monica, The Neville Brothers, Total, Trey Lorenz and UBU.

Although the reception of the album was mediocre, it managed to spawn a single, Skee-Lo's "Top of the Stairs", which peaked at No. 73 on the US Billboard Hot R&B/Hip-Hop Songs.

== Track listing ==
No.	Title	Writer(s)	Producer(s)	Length
1.	"The Train Is Coming (Money Train Remix)" (Shaggy & Ken Boothe)	Orville Richard Burrell; Kenneth George Boothe	Robert Livingston; Sting Int'l	4:09
2.	"Top of the Stairs" (Skee-Lo)	Antoine Roundtree	Walter Kahn; Skee-Lo	4:31
3.	"Do You Know" (Total)	Terri Robinson	Sean "Puffy" Combs	3:26
4.	"Show You the Way to Go" (Men of Vizion)	Kenneth Gamble; Leon Huff	Teddy Riley	5:30
5.	"Hiding Place" (Assorted Phlavors & Patra)	Dorothy Smith; Dave Hall; Gordon Chambers	Dave "Jam" Hall	4:33
6.	"Making Love" (112)	Daron Jones; Marvin Scandrick; Michael Keith; Quinnes Parker; Tim Kelley; Bob Robinson; Kevin Wales	Tim & Bob	5:45
7.	"The Thrill I'm In" (Luther Vandross)	James Harris III; Terry Lewis	Jimmy Jam and Terry Lewis	4:14
8.	"Still Not Over You" (Trey Lorenz)	Lloyd Lorenz Smith; Mark C. Rooney; Mark Morales	Cory Rooney; Prince Markie Dee	4:52
9.	"It's Alright" (Terri & Monica)	Robinson; Dwight Myers; Jean-Claude Olivier	Heavy D; Poke	4:34
10.	"Oh Baby" (4.0)	Jason Sylvain; Ron Jackson; Sammy Crumbley; Tony Hightower; Alexander Benjamin Richbourg; McKinley Horton	Alex Richbourg	3:58
11.	"Merry-Go-Round" (UBU)	Frank Thomas; Raymond Finks; Bryant Edwards; Michael Bell; Roger Troutman; Larry Troutman	B Laidback; Mike Smoov	4:07
12.	"Hold On! I'm Comin'" (The Neville Brothers)	Isaac Hayes; David Porter	Larry Hamby	3:38
13.	"Money Train Suite" (Mark Mancina)	Mark Mancina	Mark Mancina	4:50
Total length:				58:07

Notes

- Tracks 3, 5, 9, 11 to 13 did not appear in the film.
