= Melissa Brown (singer) =

Melissa Brown (born in 1976 in Burbank, California) is an American singer-songwriter who performed under the name "Miranda" in the early 90s. She provided backing vocals on the 1994 single "Bounce" by The Movement. She also provided vocals on the 1994 techno pop music hit was "Your Love is So Divine", which itself was based on an earlier house track titled "Highschool Sweetheart" by Ray Quick.

"Your Love Is So Divine" peaked at #66 on the United States, Hot 100 and helped usher in an era where house-pop-techno music began to get more airplay on rhythmic radio stations.

Miranda's follow-up single later that year, "Round and Round" proved less successful and an album she had been working on (reportedly titled "Mercury's Moon") never materialized, although the tracks were later leaked online.

== Discography ==
=== Studio albums ===
- Mercury's Moon (1994) (unreleased)

=== Singles ===
List of singles, with selected chart positions
| Title | Year | Peak chart positions | |
| Title | Year | Billboard Hot 100 | U.S. Dance |
|---|---|---|---|
| "Bounce" (with The Movement) | 1994 | — | — |
| "Your Love Is So Divine" | 1994 | 66 | 1 |
| "Round and Round" | 1994 | — | — |
| "Sound Off" (12" promo) | 1995 | — | — |
| "Give Me Your Love" | 1995 | — | — |
