= I Wish (Skee-Lo album) =

Studio album by Skee-Lo
- Released: June 27, 1995
- Recorded: 1994–1995
- Studio: Sunshine (Hollywood, CA)
- Genre: Hip hop; jazz rap
- Length: 46:26
- Label: Scotti Brothers
- Producer: Skee-Lo; Walter Kahn

Skee-Lo chronology
I Wish (1995)	I Can't Stop (2000)

Singles from I Wish
- 1. "I Wish" Released: April 10, 1995; 2. "Top of the Stairs" Released: October 30, 1995; 3. "Superman" Released: February 27, 1996

Professional ratings
Review scores
Source	Rating
AllMusic	4/5 stars
Cash Box	(favorable)
The Guardian	2/5 stars
Muzik	2.5/5 stars
NME	6/10

I Wish is the debut studio album by American rapper Skee-Lo. It was released on June 27, 1995, via Sunshine/Scotti Bros. Records. The album was recorded and edited at Sunshine Studios in Hollywood, California. It was produced by Walter "Kandor" Kahn and Skee-Lo, and recorded and engineered by Todd Tracy. It features guest appearances from Funky & Trend. The album peaked at number 53 on the Billboard 200 and number 37 on the Top R&B/Hip-Hop Albums, eventually achieving gold status by the Recording Industry Association of America on November 16, 1995, for sales of 500,000 copies in the United States. It was also nominated for a Grammy Award for Best Rap Album at the 38th Annual Grammy Awards.

Three months prior to the album's release, Skee-Lo's debut single, also titled "I Wish", was released independently on Sunshine Records. The song quickly became a hit, peaking at No. 13 on the Billboard Hot 100 and also receiving a gold certification by the RIAA and Grammy Award for Best Rap Solo Performance nomination.

The album's second single, "Top of the Stairs", released on October 30, 1995, was also a success, reaching No. 38 in the UK, #59 in Sweden and #112 in the US. The song later featured in Joseph Ruben's 1995 film Money Train soundtrack.

Music videos for both "I Wish" and "Top of the Stairs" were directed by Marty Thomas. The third single off of the album was "Superman", released on February 27, 1996.

== Track listing ==
All tracks are written by Skee-Lo. "Crenshaw" was also written by Jzahunn C. Echols. All tracks are produced by Skee-Lo and Walter "Kandor" Kahn.

No.	Title	Length
1.	"Superman"	4:11
2.	"I Wish"	4:10
3.	"Never Crossed My Mind"	4:02
4.	"Top of the Stairs"	4:32
5.	"Come Back to Me"	3:27
6.	"Waitin' for You"	3:27
7.	"Holdin' On"	3:14
8.	"You Ain't Down"	3:49
9.	"Crenshaw" (featuring Funke Trend)	3:54
10.	"This Is How It Sounds"	3:24
11.	"The Burger Song"	3:35
12.	"I Wish" (Bonus "Street" Mix)	4:42
Total length:		46:26

== Personnel ==
- Antoine "Skee-Lo" Roundtree – main artist, programming, producer, arranger
- Jzahunn "Funky Trend" Echols – featured artist (track 9)
- Danielle LaMette – backing vocals
- Kimberly Poullard – backing vocals
- Phyllis Roundtree – backing vocals
- Michael Underwood – bass, guitar, keyboards, synthesizer
- Todd Tracy – bass, guitar, assistant engineering
- Rod Jones – bass, guitar, assistant programming
- Andre Storey – bass, guitar
- Craig Sharmat – bass, guitar
- Amos Delone – keyboards, synthesizer, saxophone
- Kenny B. – keyboards, synthesizer
- Carl "Hazze" Gilkey – scratches
- Archie L. Roundtree – assistant programming, management
- Walter "Kandor" Kahn – producer, engineering, mixing
- Colin Sauers – assistant engineering
- Sven Holcomb – assistant engineering
- Arnie Acosta – mastering
- Doug Haverty – art direction
- J-me Corrales – art direction
- Command A Studios, Inc. – design
- Johnny Buzzerio – photography

== Charts ==
Chart performance for I Wish
Chart (1995–96)	Peak
Dutch Albums (Album Top 100)	61
German Albums (Offizielle Top 100)	71
US Billboard 200	53
US Top R&B/Hip-Hop Albums (Billboard)	37

== Certifications ==
Sales certifications for I Wish
Region	Certification	Certified units/sales
United States (RIAA)	Gold	500,000^{^}
^{^} Shipments figures based on certification alone.
