= Mr. Right =

Mr. Right refers to the ideal or suitable mate or husband.

Mr. Right may also refer to:

== Films and television ==
- Mr. Right (2009 film), a gay-themed film directed by David Morris and Jacqui Morris
- Mr. Right (2015 film), an American action comedy film, starring Anna Kendrick and Sam Rockwell
- Mr. Right, a 2015 romantic comedy film, starring Erica Tazel and Columbus Short
- Mr. Right (TV series), a 2018 Chinese television series
- "Mr. Right!", a 2003 episode of The Fairly OddParents
- "Mr. Right" (Murder City), a 2004 television episode

== Music ==
- Mr. Right, a 1985 album by Joe Simon
- "Mr. Right", a song by Leona Lewis on her 2013 album Christmas, with Love
- "Mr. Right", a song by Kim Chiu on her 2015 album Chinita Princess
- "Mr Right" (song), a 2023 song by Mae Stephens and Meghan Trainor

== See also ==
- "Mrs. Right", a 2011 song by Mindless Behavior
- Mr. Wright, a 1985 album by Bernard Wright
