= The Adventures of Astral Pirates =

Studio album by Lenny White
- Released: 1978
- Studio: Different Fur Studios
- Genres: Jazz fusion, jazz-funk, post-bop
- Length: 33:24
- Label: Elektra
- Producers: Lenny White, Al Kooper

Lenny White chronology
Big City (1977)	The Adventures of Astral Pirates (1978)	Streamline (1978)

The Adventures of Astral Pirates is the third studio album by drummer Lenny White, released in 1978 by Elektra Records. The album reached No. 18 on the Cashbox Top Jazz Albums chart.

== Critical reception ==
Professional ratings
Review scores
Source	Rating
AllMusic	4.5/5 stars

Alex Henderson of AllMusic praised the album saying "One of Lenny White's finest, most essential albums, The Adventures of Astral Pirates is a jazz-fusion masterpiece with a futuristic science-fiction theme....This set isn't the least bit predictable, and it could easily be described as "the sound of surprise"—critic Whitney Balliett's term for jazz—even though no one will mistake it for straight-ahead bop any time soon."

A review in the Great Yarmouth Mercury described it as a "Space/Rock concept Album" and a vinyl extravaganza by the artist Lenny White, a "highly-rated jazz/rock drummer...who dictates the album's spicy rhythm and blues flavour."

== Track listing ==
=== Side Pursuit ===
No.	Title	Length
1.	"Prelude: Theme For Astral Pirates"	1:20
2.	"Pursuit"	2:58
3.	"Mandarin Warlords"	5:06
4.	"The Great Pyramid"	2:30
5.	"Universal Love"	3:30
6.	"Remembering"	0:34
7.	"Revelation (Astral Pirates)"	3:25

=== Side Encounter ===
No.	Title	Length
8.	"Stew, Cabbage And Galactic Beans"	3:51
9.	"Heavy Metal Monster"	4:39
10.	"Assault"	3:36
11.	"Climax: Theme For Astral Pirates"	7:42
