= Anomaly (Lenny White album) =

Studio album by Lenny White
- Released: 2010
- Genre: Jazz
- Label: Abstract Logix

Lenny White chronology
Hancock Island (2008)	Anomaly (2010)	Lenny White Live (2013)

Anomaly is a studio album by jazz drummer Lenny White, released in 2010 on Abstract Logix. The album peaked at No. 25 on the US Billboard Top Contemporary Jazz Albums chart.

== Critical reception ==
Professional ratings
Review scores
Source	Rating
All About Jazz	3/5 stars

Ian Patterson of All About Jazz, in a 3/5-star review, exclaimed "Essentially, this is a hard grooving rock album, while possessing elements of the exploration and improvisation that characterized the jazz-rock and fusion of his early career, and more besides. White has never stood still or rested on his laurels, and in spite of Anomaly's roster of heavyweight fusion musicians, the music is nicely varied, with rock, funk, fusion—and the R&B that increasingly colored his releases in the '90s—all featured here. There is definitely a harder rocking edge to much of the music, compared to the rest of his discography...Anomaly is a fine addition to White's discography, with the drummer at the height of his considerable playing powers."

== Track listing ==
No.	Title	Writer(s)	Length
1.	"Drum Boogie"	Nick Moroch/Lenny White/Bernard Wright	03:17
2.	"We Know"	Lenny White	04:32
3.	"Forever"	Nicki Richards/Lenny White	04:41
4.	"Dark Moon"	David Gilmore	06:48
5.	"Gazelle"	Joe Henderson	06:02
6.	"If U Dare"	Tom Guarna	04:52
7.	"Election Day"	Lenny White	04:17
8.	"Coming Down"	Lenny White	05:46
9.	"Catlett Out of the Bag"	Mike Clark/Lenny White	06:48
10.	"Water Changes Everything"	Rennie Hurst/Lenny White/Sammie Williams	04:20
11.	"Anthem"	George Colligan	06:02
12.	"The Wait Has Lifted the Weight"	Lenny White	08:29
