= Kid Stuff (Twennynine song) =

Single by Twennynine

from the album Twennynine with Lenny White
- B-side: "Slip Away"
- Released: 1980
- Genre: Funk; R&B
- Length: 3:50
- Label: Elektra
- Songwriter(s): Skip Anderson, Eddie Martinez, Denzil Miller, Lenny White
- Producer(s): Lenny White, Larry Dunn

Twennynine singles chronology
"Citi Dancin/Betta" (1979)	"Kid Stuff" (1980)	"Fancy Dancer" (1980)

"Peanut Butter" is a song by funk/r&b band Twennynine, released in 1980 on Elektra Records as the first single from their second album, Twennynine with Lenny White. The song peaked at No. 3 on the US Billboard Hot R&B Singles chart.

== Critical reception ==
Allmusic's Jason Elias, in his review of Twennynine with Lenny White, exclaimed "The cutesy "Kid Stuff" is a little too silly, but honestly, this (new) incarnation of the band certainly could get away with it."
