= Kid Stuff (disambiguation) =

"Kid Stuff" is a 1953 science fiction short story by Isaac Asimov.

Kid Stuff may also refer to:

- Kid Stuff (film), 1975 Italian-Spanish adventure-comedy film
- Kid Stuff (album), a 2008 compilation album by Nancy Sinatra
- "Kid Stuff" (Barbara Fairchild song), 1973
- "Kid Stuff" (Twennynine song), 1980
- "Kid Stuff" (Justice League Unlimited episode), an episode of the animated series
- Kid Stuff Records, defunct US record label

== See also ==
- Kidstuff
