= Tell Me (I'll Be Around) =

1996 single by Shades

Single by Shades

from the album Shades
- B-side: "Love Means More"
- Released: June 25, 1996
- Genre: R&B
- Length: 4:51 (album version); 4:05 (single edit)
- Label: Motown
- Songwriter(s): Danielle Andrews; Charles Farrar; Monique Peoples; Troy Taylor; Bernard Wright; Lenny Wright; Shannon Walker Williams; Tiffanie Cardwell
- Producer(s): Charles Farrar; Troy Taylor

Shades singles chronology
"Tell Me (I'll Be Around)" (1996)	"Serenade" (1997)

"Tell Me (I'll Be Around)" (originally titled "Tell Me Your Name") is a song performed by Shades, issued as the lead single from their eponymous debut album. The song contains a sample of "Who Do You Love" by Bernard Wright. It was the group's highest chart appearance on the Billboard Hot 100, peaking at #50 in 1996.

== Chart positions ==
Chart (1996)	Peak position
US Billboard Hot 100	50
US Hot R&B/Hip-Hop Singles & Tracks (Billboard)	34
US Rhythmic Top 40 (Billboard)	19
