= Letizia Gambi =

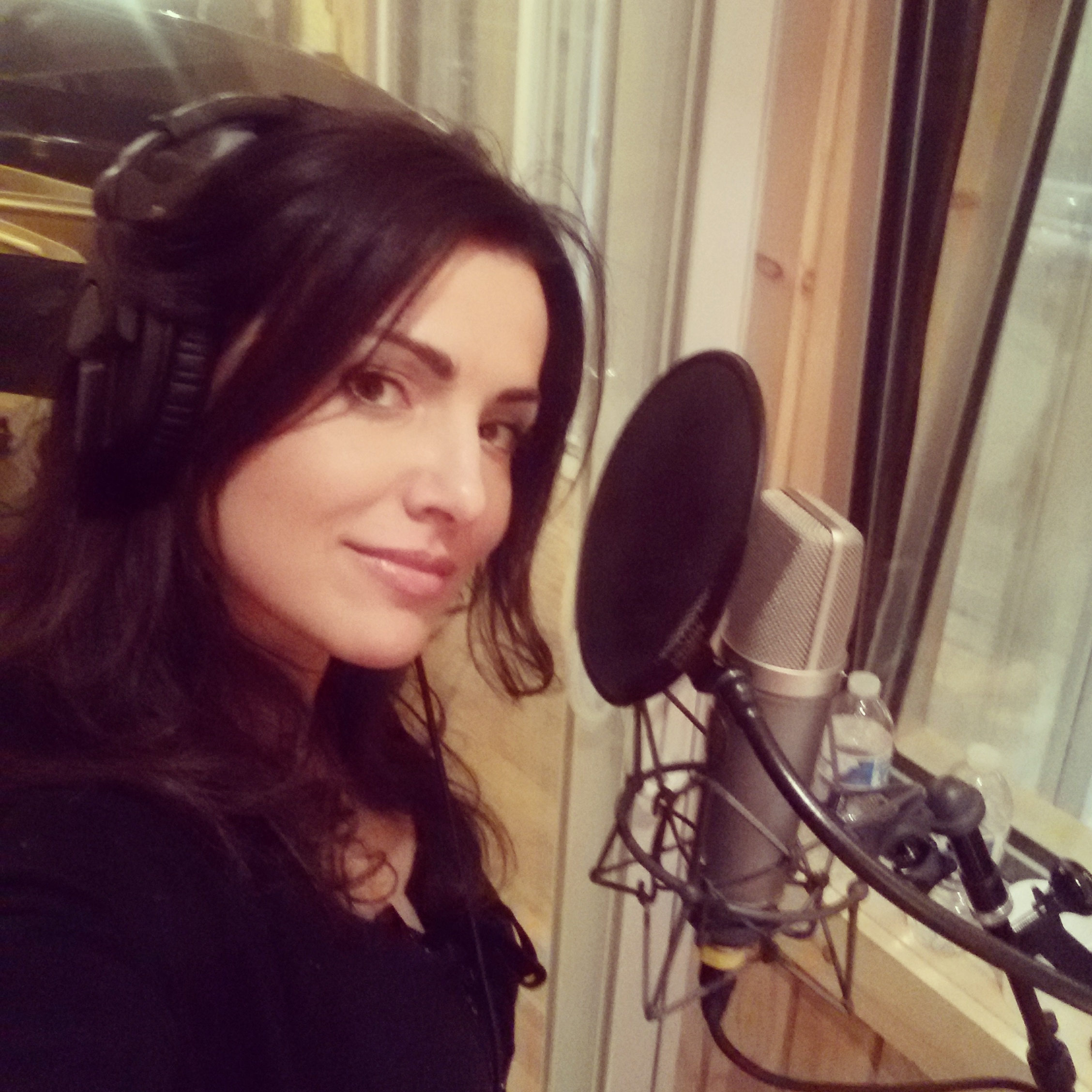
- Gambi in 2017

Background information
- Born: Naples, Italy
- Genres: Jazz, traditional pop, world music, easy listening
- Occupations: Singer, songwriter, musician, actress
- Instrument: Vocals
- Years active: 2003–present
- Labels: Jando Music, Via Veneto Jazz, Iyouwe, RP, City Hall
- Website: letiziagambi.com

Letizia Gambi is an Italian singer-songwriter and actress. Her music is a fusion between her Italian and Neapolitan heritage and Black-American jazz roots. Gambi performs and records in English, Italian, Neapolitan and Spanish and is best known for her work with Lenny White, Ron Carter, Gato Barbieri, Chick Corea, Wallace Roney, Patrice Rushen, Gil Goldstein, Helen Sung, Pete Levin. She has been awarded with the San Gennaro Award and was nominated for the Targa Tenco. Letizia is a Recording Academy voting member since 2012.

== Early life and education ==
Letizia Gambi was born in Naples, Italy, to an artistic family. Her family moved to Como where she studied art and dancing. Later Gambi moved to Milan where she studied acting and singing. She graduated from Milan's International Jazz School with a master's degree in Jazz vocal performance.

== Career ==
=== Work with Lenny White ===
In 2009, Gambi met Lenny White playing with Chick Corea and Stanley Clarke at the Blue Note in Milan. As result of their meeting, White produced her 2012 debut album Introducing Letizia Gambi, three singles and the 2016 sophomore album Blue Monday. Gambi's collaboration with Lenny White included work with Ron Carter, Gato Barbieri, Chick Corea, Wallace Roney, Patrice Rushen, Gil Goldstein, Helen Sung, Dave Stryker, Pete Levin, Donald Vega, Pedrito Martinez, John Benitez, Hector Del Curto, Jisoo Ok, Antonio Faraò, Max Ionata and Dario Rosciglione.

=== Letizia Gambi in 3D ===
In 2018 Gambi formed an all female band under the name Letizia Gambi in 3D, members of the band include Elisabetta Serio on piano and Giovanna Famulari on cello. The band started as a trio, then she added a drummer. The female quartet made its debut on the International Jazz Day of 2021, organized by the historic Blues Alley Club in Washington, D.C., under the patronage of the Italian Cultural Institute of the city, the Herbie Hancock Jazz Institute and UNESCO.

== Personal life ==
In 2009, Gambi experienced SSNHL (Sudden Sensorineural Hearing Loss) leading to total permanent hearing loss in her right ear. Her brother Gianpaolo Gambi, is an actor, TV host and writer. Her uncle is an opera singer. She lives between New York and Miami.

== Discography ==
=== Albums ===
- 2012: Introducing Letizia Gambi
- 2016: Blue Monday

=== Singles ===
- 2014: "My Town (Carmela)" (Lounge Mix by MDB)
- 2019: "Blue Monday"
- 2019: "Under the Moon" (with Lenny White, Gil Goldstein and Helen Sung)

=== Notable album appearances ===
- 2020: Come musica by Fahir Atakoğlu, on "For Love" (lyrics and vocals)
