= Best of Friends (Twennynine album) =

Studio album by Twennynine featuring Lenny White
- Released: October 1979
- Genre: Funk; R&B
- Length: 32:22
- Label: Elektra
- Producer: Larry Dunn; Lenny White

Twennynine chronology
Best of Friends (1979)	Twennynine with Lenny White (1980)

Lenny White chronology
Streamline (1978)	Best of Friends (1979)	Twennynine with Lenny White (1980)

Professional ratings
Review scores
Source	Rating
AllMusic	4/5 stars

Best of Friends is the debut album by American R&B band Twennynine, released in October 1979 on Elektra Records. It was produced by Lenny White and Larry Dunn. The album reached No. 15 on the Billboard Top R&B Albums chart.

== Singles ==
The single, "Peanut Butter", reached number three on the Billboard Hot Soul Singles chart.

== Track listing ==
No.	Title	Writer(s)	Length
1.	"Citi Dancin'"	Lenny White; Barry Johnson	4:24
2.	"Take Me or Leave Me"	Eddie Martinez	4:00
3.	"Best of Friends"	Lenny White; Denzil A. Miller Jr; Leslie Rene	3:52
4.	"Peanut Butter"	Donald Blackman	3:37
5.	"Betta"	Barry Johnson	4:18
6.	"Morning Sunrise"	Donald Blackman	3:18
7.	"Oh Sylvie"	Denzil A. Miller Jr; Valmon Burke	3:42
8.	"Tropical Nights"	Lenny White	5:11

== Personnel ==
- Don Blackman – vocals
- Larry Dunn – producer
- Eddie Martinez – guitar
- Denzil A. Miller Jr – keyboards
- Lenny White – drums, producer
- Lynn Davis – backing vocals
- Paulinho Da Costa – special percussion
- Barry "Sunjohn" Johnson - Bass, Vocals
