= Mr. Wright =

Studio album by Bernard Wright
- Released: 1985
- Genre: R&B
- Label: Manhattan
- Producer: Lenny White; Marcus Miller

Bernard Wright chronology
Funky Beat (1983)	Mr. Wright (1985)	Fresh Hymns (1990)

Singles from Mr. Wright
- 1. "Who Do You Love" Released: 1985; 2. "After You" Released: 1985; 3. "Yo 'Nard" Released: 1985

Professional ratings
Review scores
Source	Rating
AllMusic	1/5 stars

Mr. Wright is the third studio album by American contemporary R&B singer Bernard Wright, released in 1985 via Manhattan Records. The album did not chart on the Billboard 200 but it peaked at #25 on the Billboard R&B chart. It was also Wright's last album to chart in the United States.

Three singles were released from the album: "Who Do You Love", "After You" and "Yo 'Nard". "Who Do You Love" was the most successful single from the album, peaking at #6 on the Billboard R&B singles chart in 1985.

== Track listing ==
No.	Title	Writer(s)	Length
1.	"After You"	Bernard Wright, Lenny White, Marcus Miller	5:42
2.	"Who Do You Love"	Wright; White	4:12
3.	"Love You So"	Wright, White, Kevin Osborne	4:18
4.	"Yo 'Nard"	Wright, White	4:46
5.	"Too Damn Hot"	White, Steve Teele	4:28
6.	"Killin' Me"	Wright, White, Miller	4:21
7.	"Just When You Thought You Were Mine"	Wright, Miller	4:35
8.	"Brown Shoes"	Wright	5:10

== Personnel ==
- Bernard Wright: Lead vocals, Keyboards, Synthesizers, Solo Guitar on "Too Damn Hot," backing vocals on various tracks, all instruments on tracks 8
- Flare Funston: Drums, Percussion
- Lenny White: Tymbales
- Marcus Miller: Bass, Guitar on "Who Do You Love," Additional Synthesizers on "Just When I Thought You Were Mine"
- Nick Moroch: Guitar
- Yvonne Lewis: Backing vocals on "After You," "Love You So," "Too Damn Hot"
- Marla Adler: Backing vocals on "After You," "Who Do You Love"
- Lester Bell: Backing vocals on "After You"
- Sybil Thomas: Backing vocals on "Love You So," "Too Damn Hot"
- Dennis Collins: Backing vocals on "Love You So," "Too Damn Hot"
- Alec Head: Bridge rap on "Killin' Me"
- Old Man Mose: Vocalization on "Brown Shoes"
- Anita Wright, Kevin Osborne, Lenny White: Yo Nards on "Yo Nard"

== Chart positions ==
Chart (1985)	Peak position
US R&B Albums (Billboard)	25
