= Serenade (Shades song) =

Single by Shades

from the album Shades
- Released: May 20, 1997
- Recorded: 1996
- Studio: Soundtrack Recording Studios (New York, NY); Sony Music Studios (New York, NY); The Hit Factory Studios (New York, NY)
- Genre: R&B
- Label: Motown
- Songwriters: Shannon Walker Williams; Monique Peoples; Tiffanie Cardwell; Danielle Andrews; Darrell Allamby; Billy Lawrence; Gary Kemp
- Producer: Darrell "Delite" Allamby

Shades singles chronology
"Tell Me (I'll Be Around)" (1996)	"Serenade" (1997)	"I Believe" (1997)

Music video
- "Serenade" on YouTube

"Serenade" is a song by American contemporary R&B quartet Shades. It was released on May 20, 1997, via Motown Records as the second single from the group's only eponymous studio album Shades. Production was handled by Darrell "Delite" Allamby, who utilized a sample of Spandau Ballet's "True", with LaForrest "La La" Cope serving as vocal producer.

In the United States, the song peaked at number 88 on the Billboard 200 and number 28 on the Rhythmic Airplay charts. The song also marks the group's debut in the United Kingdom music charts, reaching number 75 on the UK singles chart, number 26 on the UK Dance Singles and number 19 on the UK Hip Hop and R&B Singles charts. It also made it to number 7 in New Zealand.

An accompanying music video was directed by Matt X.

== Track listing ==
CD single and cassette single
No.	Title	Length
1.	"Serenade" (LP Version)	4:04
2.	"Serenade" (Instrumental)	4:03

12" single
No.	Title	Length
1.	"Serenade" (LP Version)
2.	"Serenade" (Radio Edit)
3.	"Serenade" (Instrumental)
4.	"Serenade" (A Cappella)

Maxi single
No.	Title	Length
1.	"Serenade" (LP Version)
2.	"Serenade" (Spanish Version)
3.	"Tell Me (I'll Be Around)" (LP Version)
4.	"Serenade" (Piano Version)

== Personnel ==
- Shannon Walker Williams – vocals
- Monique Peoples – vocals
- Tiffanie Cardwell – vocals
- Danielle Andrews – vocals
- Darrell "Delite" Allamby – background vocals, producer, mixing, Spanish translation
- LaForrest "LaLa" Cope – vocal producer
- Chris Theis – recording
- Steve Sisco – recording
- Carl Nappa – mixing
- Rich Travali – mixing
- Andre Harrell – executive producer
- Edward "DJ Eddie F." Ferrell – executive producer
- Chad "Dr. Ceuss" Elliott – executive producer, A&R direction
- Lewis Tillman – executive producer, A&R direction
- Glen Parrish – A&R direction
- Ricardo Minot – Spanish translation
- Omyra Osorio – Spanish translation
- Lilia Bell – Spanish translation

== Charts ==
Chart (1997)	Peak position
New Zealand (Recorded Music NZ)	7
UK Singles (Official Charts)	75
UK Dance (Official Charts)	26
UK Hip Hop/R&B (Official Charts)	19
US Billboard Hot 100	88
US Rhythmic Airplay (Billboard)	28
