= The Train Is Coming =

Single by Ken Boothe
- B-side: "Feel It"
- Released: 1966
- Studio: Jamaica Recording Studio (Kingston)
- Genre: Reggae; rocksteady
- Label: Supreme Records
- Songwriter(s): Kenneth George Boothe

"The Train Is Coming" is a song written and performed by Jamaican reggae artist Ken Boothe. It was released as a single in 1966 through Supreme Records. Recording sessions took place at Jamaica Recording Studio in Kingston. Produced by Coxsone Dodd, it featured backing vocals from The Wailers Band.

Fellow Jamaican musician Shaggy, alongside Boothe and producer Robert Livingston, re-worked the song for his third studio album Boombastic, which was released in 1995 via Virgin Records. The single "Something Different"/"The Train Is Coming" peaked at number 21 on the UK singles chart in 1996, staying in the chart for five weeks.

Later same year, the 'Money Train Remix' version of the song appeared in action comedy film Money Train, as well as in its soundtrack album, Money Train (Music From The Motion Picture), by Epic Soundtrax.

The British reggae/pop band UB40 covered the song for their 1998 album Labour of Love III, released for DEP International. UB40's cover version made it to number 30 on the UK singles charts in 1999 staying in the charts for two weeks.
