= Streamline (Lenny White album) =

Studio album by Lenny White
- Released: 1978
- Recorded: July–August 1978
- Studios: Wally Heider (Hollywood); Indigo Ranch (Malibu); Hollywood Sound (Hollywood)
- Genres: Jazz fusion, jazz-funk, post-bop
- Length: 37:01
- Label: Elektra
- Producers: Lenny White; Larry Dunn

Lenny White chronology
Big City (1977)	Streamline (1978)	Best of Friends (1978)

Streamline is the fourth studio album by drummer Lenny White, released in 1978 by Elektra Records. The album reached No. 27 on the Billboard Top Jazz Albums chart.

== Critical reception ==
Professional ratings
Review scores
Source	Rating
AllMusic	3/5 stars
The Rolling Stone Jazz Record Guide	3/5 stars

Alex Henderson at AllMusic wrote that the album "isn't a five-star gem, but it isn't bad either" and calling it a "generally decent, if mildly uneven, collection of instrumental jazz fusion and R&B vocal numbers." He noted White's cover of the Beatles' "Lady Madonna" as an "interesting" highlight; other songs such as "Night Games", "Struttin'" and "Pooh Bear" he described as "enjoyable even though they fall short of the brilliance of the material on The Adventures of Astral Pirates [1978] and Venusian Summer [1975]."

== Track listing ==
No.	Title	Writer(s)	Length
1.	"Struttin'"	Jamie Glaser	4:45
2.	"Lady Madonna"	John Lennon, Paul McCartney	3:54
3.	"12 Bars From Mars"	Nick Moroch	3:10
4.	"Earthlings"	Lenny White, Don Blackman	4:48
5.	"Spazmo Strikes Again"	White	0:25
6.	"Time"	Blackman	2:58
7.	"Pooh Bear"	White, Weldon Irvine	5:02
8.	"Lockie's Inspiration"	Denzil Miller, Jr.	0:41
9.	"I'll See You Soon"	White	6:30
10.	"Night Games"	Marcus Miller	3:58
11.	"Cosmic Indigo"	Blackman	0:50
Total length:			37:01

== Personnel ==
Credits adapted from LP liner notes.

Musicians

- Lenny White – drums, percussion; drum solo (5, 10)
- Nick Moroch – guitars; guitar solo (2–6, 8–9)
- Donald "Captain Keyboards" Blackman – keyboards, vocals; organ solo (3), Minimoog solo (4), Oberheim synthesizer solo (6), acoustic piano solo (8), Rhodes piano solo (9), piano solo (10)
- Jamie Glaser – guitars; guitar solo (1, 3, 9)
- Marcus Miller – bass guitar; bass guitar solo (8, 10)
- Denzil "Broadway" Miller – keyboards; keyboard solo (7), Minimoog solo (8)

Additional musicians

- Chaka Khan – lead and background vocals (2)
- Dianne Reeves – background vocals
- Larry Dunn – synthesizer programming; Minimoog solo (1)

Technical

- Lenny White – producer
- Larry Dunn – producer
- Denzil Miller – rhythm track arranger (2)
- Chris Brunt – engineer
- Richard Kaplan – engineer
- Steve Hirsch – engineer
- Moshe Brakha – photography

== Charts ==
Chart (1978)	Peak position
US Billboard Jazz Albums	27
