= Kidstuff =

Kidstuff could refer to:

- Kidstuff (TV series), a 1970s Canadian TV series
- "Kidstuff" (song), from The Beautiful Game (Acoustic Alchemy album), 2000
- "Kidstuff", a character in the Lucky Stars film series

== See also ==
- Kid Stuff (disambiguation)
