= I Wish (Skee-Lo song) =

1995 single by Skee-Lo

Single by Skee-Lo

from the album I Wish
- Released: April 10, 1995
- Studio: Sunshine (Hollywood, Los Angeles)
- Genre: West Coast hip-hop; alternative hip-hop; jazz rap
- Length: 4:10
- Label: Scotti Bros.; Sunshine
- Songwriter: Antoine Roundtree
- Producers: Walter "Kandor" Kahn; Skee-Lo

Skee-Lo singles chronology
"I Wish" (1995)	"Top of the Stairs" (1995)

Music video
- "I Wish" on YouTube

"I Wish" is a song written and performed by American rapper Skee-Lo. It was released on April 10, 1995, via Scotti Brothers Records as the lead single from the rapper's debut studio album of the same name (1995). Recording sessions took place at Sunshine Studios in Hollywood, California. Production was handled by Walter "Kandor" Kahn and Skee-Lo himself.

"I Wish" peaked at numbers 13 and 16 on the Billboard Hot 100 and Cash Box Top 100, and was certified Gold by the Recording Industry Association of America for selling 600,000 copies domestically. Outside of the United States, "I Wish" peaked within the top ten of the charts in Finland, the Netherlands, Norway, Sweden, and Switzerland, the top 20 of the charts in Canada, Germany, New Zealand, and the United Kingdom, and the top 30 of the charts in Belgium, France and Israel. Its accompanying music video was directed by Marty Thomas.

Most of the song's instruments are sampled from "Spinnin'" by Bernard Wright, and the song features a vocal sample of people shouting from the track "Buffalo Gals" by Malcolm McLaren.

The song was nominated for Grammy Award for Best Rap Solo Performance at the 38th Annual Grammy Awards but lost to Coolio's "Gangsta's Paradise". Blender listed "I Wish" as number 359 on its list of "500 Greatest Songs Since You Were Born".

== Overview ==
The song's lyrics are self-deprecating, with Skee-Lo lamenting a variety of personal shortcomings that he says are to blame for his unsuccessful love life. He wishes he were of taller stature ("like 6'9") and a basketball player ("a baller"). He wishes for a better car, specifically a '64 Impala, instead of his 1974 Ford Pinto with "an 8-Track and a spare tire in the backseat, but that's flat!"

The lyrics also mention the Los Angeles neighborhood of Crenshaw, and a signpost featuring the street name appears in the background of the music video. Additionally, the song references Buffalo Springfield's "For What It's Worth" in the lyrics "Hey, you, what's that sound? / Everybody look what's going down".

== Critical reception ==
Gil Robertson IV from Cash Box stated that Scotti Brothers has got a huge hit on its hands with this "good-natured, whimsical track" from the Southern California rapper. He added, "This track moves throughout with an intoxicating bass beat and smooth driving California flavor adds to its mix. Having already received a ton of urban radio adds and with a video that's just been added to the rotation on MTV, this single shows strong potential to succeed on the R&B and pop charts as well." James Masterton for Dotmusic said, "Even at Christmas dance and rap hits can still have an impact. The brilliant pop hip-hop of Skee-Lo comes via persistent plugging from Radio One and a certain degreee [sic] of dancefloor popularity." Ross Jones from The Guardian wrote, "Over a snake-hipped R&B groove, the boy's light-hearted delivery and humble subject matter invite favourable comparisons with both The Pharcyde and Souls Of Mischief." Philippine newspaper Manila Standard named it "a true rarity — a rap song that dares to express vulnerable sentiments while retaining a funky edge".

A reviewer from Music Week gave it a score of four out of five, noting, "A low-down, funky, rolling vibe from the LA-based rapper. Old-school funk fused with jazzy tinges do justice to a tune which deserves to cause waves, and not just in the hip hop fraternity." Will Ashon from Muzik described it as "a ludicrous, dayglo, superfly wish-list from the self-deprecating and immediately likeable Skee-Lo". Andrew Diprose from Smash Hits gave the song a top score of five out of five, writing, "You like hip hop? You loved Coolio's 'Gangsta's Paradise'? Check out new fella on the block Skee-Lo! With a funky, jazzy, old skool sound and amusing lyrics, this choon feels laid back. Skee-Lo has broken the aggressive gangsta rap mould and looks like he has a big 'ol hit on his hands! Tip top hip hop!" James Hunter from Vibe commented, "Dreaming of girls, cars, and height, his 'I Wish' is a most excellent pop-rap hit. Prom-night celebrity, that's his aspiration, and nobody's articulated it better in years. Skee-Lo wins because he doesn't try to sound like anything he's not".

== Music video ==
A music video was produced to promote the single, directed by Marty Thomas. The music video was released for the week ending on May 14, 1995. It was nominated for three Billboard Music Video Awards: "Best Rap Clip", "Best Rap New Artist Music Video" and "Maximum Vision Clip of the Year".

The video begins with Skee-Lo sitting on a bench like Forrest Gump. It includes scenes reenacting the story of the lyrics, such as driving around in his beat-up old car, and being picked on during a game of basketball.

== Track listing ==
All tracks are written by Antoine Roundtree.

CD single, UK (1995)
No.	Title	Length
1.	"I Wish" (Radio Edit)	4:08
2.	"I Wish" (Street Mix)	4:42
3.	"I Wish" (Old School Dub)	4:52
4.	"I Wish" (Concrete Jungle Mix)	4:30
5.	"I Wish" (Mama's Dub)	4:42
6.	"I Wish" (Acappella)	5:35

== Charts ==
=== Weekly charts ===
Weekly chart performance for "I Wish"
Chart (1995–1996)	Peak position
Australia (ARIA)	74
Belgium (Ultratop 50 Flanders)	22
Belgium (Ultratop 50 Wallonia)	21
Canada Retail Singles (The Record)	20
Canada Top Singles (RPM)	76
Canada Dance/Urban (RPM)	6
Denmark (IFPI)	12
Europe (Eurochart Hot 100)	17
Europe (European Dance Radio)	8
Finland (Suomen virallinen lista)	5
France (SNEP)	24
Germany (GfK)	14
Iceland (Íslenski Listinn Topp 40)	14
Ireland (IRMA)	17
Israel (Israeli Singles Chart)	24
Netherlands (Dutch Top 40)	10
Netherlands (Single Top 100)	6
New Zealand (Recorded Music NZ)	14
Norway (VG-lista)	4
Scottish Singles Sales (Official Charts)	34
Sweden (Sverigetopplistan)	4
Switzerland (Schweizer Hitparade)	10
UK Singles (Official Charts)	15
UK Hip Hop/R&B (Official Charts)	3
UK Club Chart (Music Week)	46
US Billboard Hot 100	13
US Hot R&B Singles (Billboard)	33
US Hot Rap Singles (Billboard)	8
US Maxi-Singles Sales (Billboard)	22
US Top 40/Rhythm-Crossover (Billboard)	13
US Cash Box Top 100	16

=== Year-end charts ===
1995 year-end chart performance for "I Wish"
Chart (1995)	Position
US Billboard Hot 100	58
US Hot Rap Singles (Billboard)	27

1996 year-end chart performance for "I Wish"
Chart (1996)	Position
Belgium (Ultratop 50 Flanders)	98
Belgium (Ultratop 50 Wallonia)	91
Europe (Eurochart Hot 100)	70
Germany (Media Control)	98
Sweden (Topplistan)	59

== Certifications ==
Certifications for "I Wish"
Region	Certification	Certified units/sales
New Zealand (RMNZ)	Gold	15,000^{‡}
Norway (IFPI Norway)	Gold	
United Kingdom (BPI)	Platinum	600,000^{‡}
United States (RIAA)	Gold	500,000^{^}
^{^} Shipments figures based on certification alone.^{‡} Sales+streaming figures based on certification alone.

== Release history ==
Release dates and formats for "I Wish"
Region	Date	Format(s)	Label(s)	Ref.
United States	April 10, 1995	12-inch vinyl; CD; cassette	Scotti Bros.; Sunshine	
United Kingdom	November 27, 1995	12-inch vinyl; CD; cassette	Wildcard; Sunshine	
