= Who Do You Love (Bernard Wright song) =

1985 single by Bernard Wright

Single by Bernard Wright

from the album Mr. Wright
- Released: 1985
- Recorded: 1985
- Genre: R&B
- Length: 4:16
- Label: Manhattan
- Songwriter(s): Bernard Wright; Lenny White
- Producer(s): Lenny White; Marcus Miller

Bernard Wright singles chronology
"Video Generation" (1983)	"Who Do You Love" (1985)	"After You" (1985)

Music video
- "Who Do You Love" on YouTube

"Who Do You Love" is a song performed by American contemporary R&B singer Bernard Wright, co-written by Wright and Lenny White. The song was issued as the first single from Wright's third studio album Mr. Wright. The song was his highest chart appearance on the Billboard R&B chart, peaking at #6 in 1985. The female vocalist was Marla Adler.

"Who Do You Love" was covered by co-writer Lenny White in 1995 as well as gospel group Winans Phase 2 in 1999. Since the song's release, it has been sampled in numerous songs: "Never Been in Love B4" by Shinehead, "If It Ain't Love" by Tichina Arnold, "Tell Me (I'll Be Around)" by Shades, "Who Is a Thug" by Big Pun, and "Is It Kool?" by Luniz; as well as in the remix of "Loungin" by LL Cool J. The song was regarded as Wright's most significant R&B appearance.

The official music video for the song was directed by Zbigniew Rybczyński.

== Chart positions ==
Chart (1985)	Peak position
US Hot Dance Music/Maxi-Singles Sales (Billboard)	44
US Hot R&B/Hip-Hop Singles & Tracks (Billboard)	6
