= Shades (group) =

American contemporary R&B group

- Origin: Boston, Massachusetts, United States
- Genres: R&B
- Years active: 1996–1997, 2019
- Labels: Motown
- Past members: Danielle Andrews; Tiffanie Cardwell; Monique Peoples; Shannon Walker Williams

Shades is an American R&B group that was active in the mid 1990s. The group consisted of Danielle Andrews, Tiffanie Cardwell, Monique Peoples and Shannon Walker Williams. who all met when they were students at Northeastern University in Boston, Massachusetts.

The group released their eponymous debut album in 1997 on Motown Records. The most successful single from the album was the lead single "Tell Me (I'll Be Around)", which peaked at #50 on the Billboard Hot 100. They reunited in 2019 and released a new single “This Ain’t Love”.

== Discography ==
=== Albums ===
- Shades (1997)

=== Singles ===
Year	Song	Peak chart positions				Album
Year	Song	U.S. Hot 100	U.S. R&B	U.S. Rhythmic	New Zealand	Album
1996	"Tell Me (I'll Be Around)"	50	34	19	8	Shades
1997	"Serenade"	88	—	28	7	Shades
1997	"I Believe"	—	—	—	—	Shades
2019	"This Ain’t Love"	—	—	—	—	Non-album single
