= The Love Has Never Gone: Tribute to Earth, Wind & Fire =

Studio album by The Lenny White Project
- Released: July 27, 2004
- Recorded: February 22, 1998
- Genre: Jazz
- Label: Trauma Records
- Producer: Dave Burrell, Lenny White

The Love Has Never Gone: Tribute to Earth, Wind & Fire is a tribute album to the R&B band Earth, Wind & Fire by jazz group the Lenny White Project which was released in 2004 upon Trauma Records.

== Overview ==
With Kaz Hori as its executive producer, the album was also co-produced by David Burrell and Lenny White altogether.

== Track listing ==
1. "Evil" (Bailey, White) 4:51
2. "Fantasy" (Barrio, White, White) 8:46
3. "Earth, Wind & Fire" (Scarborough, White) 7:06
4. "After the Love Has Gone" (Champlin, Foster, Graydon) 7:49
5. "See the Light" (Bailey, Dunn, Hardy) 7:11
6. "Runnin'" (DelBarrio, Dunn, White) 5:44
7. "Spirit" (Dunn, White) 6:23
8. "Getaway" (Cor, Taylor) 6:59

== Personnel ==
- Steve Boyer - Engineer
- Dave Burrell - Producer
- Kaz Hori - Executive Producer
- Bireli Lagrene - Guitar
- Antoine Roney - Saxophone
- Wallace Roney - Trumpet
- Vanessa Rubin - Vocals
- Patrice Rushen - Arranger
- Kelvin Sholar - Arranger
- Lenny White - Arranger, Drums, Producer
- Scott Young - Assistant Engineer
