= Twennynine =

- Twennynine as pictured on the cover of their 1980 debut album.

Background information
- Origin: United States
- Genres: Funk, disco, R&B, soul
- Years active: 1979–1983
- Label: Elektra Records

Twennynine, also known as Twennynine with Lenny White, was an American R&B band founded in 1979.

== Overview ==
Twennynine was founded by jazz fusion drummer Lenny White in 1979 after he left Return to Forever. White formed the band to explore commercial R&B and funk music, and to take a break from the complex jazz rock for which he was known. The group also featured keyboardist Skip Anderson, bassist Barry Johnson, and guitarist Eddie Martinez; while singers Lynn Davis, Carla Vaughn, Joycelyn Smith, and Tanya Willoghby contributed at various times throughout the group's career. They released their debut album Best of Friends on Elektra Records in 1979. The album was co-produced by White and Larry Dunn of Earth, Wind & Fire. Best of Friends rose to number 15 on the Billboard Top R&B Albums chart and number 54 on the Billboard 200 albums chart. The single "Peanut Butter" reached number three on the Billboard Hot R&B Singles chart and number 83 on the Hot 100 singles chart. The second single "Best of Friends" reached number 47 on the Billboard Hot R&B Singles chart.

Their second album Twennynine with Lenny White was released in 1980, with White and Dunn again as producers. The album reached number 22 on Billboard Top R&B Albums chart. The single "Kid Stuff" reached number 19 on the Billboard Hot R&B Singles chart, while "Fancy Dancer" reached number 17 on the Billboard Dance/Disco chart and number 25 on the Hot R&B Singles chart. Twennynine performed on American Bandstand and The Mike Douglas Show in 1980.

Twennynine released their third album Just Like Dreamin' in 1981. The group added guitarist Steve Horton for this album. Just Like Dreamin' reached number 41 on the Billboard Top R&B Albums chart. The singles "Didn't Know About Love (Till I Found You)" and "All I Want" reached numbers 31 and 62, respectively, on the Hot R&B Singles chart. Another single, "My Turn to Love You" reached number 29 on the Billboard Dance/Disco chart. The group split up in 1983, after which Lenny White returned to jazz session work.

== Discography ==
=== Albums ===
Year	Title	US Pop	US R&B	Label
1979	Best of Friends	54	3	Elektra
1980	Twennynine with Lenny White	106	22	Elektra
1981	Just Like Dreamin'	162	42	Elektra
