= Money Train =

1995 action comedy film by Joseph Ruben

- Theatrical release poster
- Directed by: Joseph Ruben
- Screenplay by: Doug Richardson; David Loughery
- Story by: Doug Richardson
- Produced by: Neil Canton; Jon Peters
- Starring: Wesley Snipes; Woody Harrelson; Jennifer Lopez; Robert Blake; Chris Cooper
- Cinematography: John W. Lindley
- Edited by: George Bowers; Bill Pankow
- Music by: Mark Mancina
- Production companies: Columbia Pictures; Peters Entertainment
- Distributed by: Sony Pictures Releasing
- Release date: November 22, 1995
- Running time: 110 minutes
- Country: United States
- Language: English
- Budget: $68 million
- Box office: $77.2 million

Money Train is a 1995 American action comedy film directed by Joseph Ruben from the screenplay by Doug Richardson and David Loughery. It stars Wesley Snipes and Woody Harrelson as the foster brothers who plan to rob the money train to pay off the latter's debt. Jennifer Lopez, Robert Blake and Chris Cooper also star. The film received generally negative reviews from critics and was a box office bomb, grossing $77.2 million worldwide against a production budget of $68 million. It has gained a cult following over the years.

== Plot ==
Foster brothers John and Charlie Robinson are decoy transit cops patrolling the New York City Subway. Chasing muggers into a subway tunnel, John and Charlie are furious when one of the teenage thieves is gunned down by officers guarding the money train, hauling subway revenue. A brawl ensues, and transit captain Donald Patterson blames the brothers for delaying the money train.

Charlie owes $15,000 in gambling debts to mobster Mr. Brown, who nearly has him thrown off a building before John intervenes, promising to pay the money his brother owes. John and Charlie both take a liking to Grace Santiago, a newly assigned decoy officer. When a serial arsonist known as Torch sets a token booth on fire, the decoy squad rescues the booth attendant, but Torch escapes after a struggle with Grace.

The squad is temporarily assigned to the money train, where another brawl earns Grace and the brothers Patterson’s displeasure. John rejects Charlie's plan to rob the train on New Year's Eve, with less security and up to $4 million on board. He gives Charlie the money to settle his debt, but Charlie is pickpocketed by an old lady on the train. Grace and John give in to their mutual attraction, while Charlie is badly beaten by Brown’s men, and is saddened to spot Grace and John sleeping together.

Grace poses as a token booth attendant in a sting operation to apprehend Torch, who recognizes her and realizes the trap. Distracting police by pushing a man in front of a train, Torch sprays Grace with gasoline but Charlie alerts the other officers, who open fire. Chasing Torch to the street, Charlie saves two children from a runaway carriage. John pursues Torch to another station, where the arsonist is burned by his own gasoline and killed by an oncoming train. Patterson fires Charlie and John over the failed operation, leading to a falling out between the brothers.

Mr. Brown warns Charlie that he will have John killed if his debt is not paid by New Year's Day, and a desperate Charlie prepares to rob the money train. John storms into Brown's strip club and fights off the mobsters, threatening Brown not to harm his brother. On New Year’s Eve, Charlie sneaks aboard the money train through a floor panel, throwing out the driver and reaching a maintenance ladder to Central Park, but is unable to escape due to mounted cops nearby. Realizing Charlie’s plan, Grace convinces John to intervene.

John reaches the train and helps Charlie avoid arrest, disabling the brakes and smashing through a steel barricade. Patterson recklessly diverts the train onto a track occupied by another train, willing to put the passengers on board in danger to secure the money train. The runaway money train rams into the passenger train, threatening to derail both trains. With no brakes and the throttle jammed, the brothers throw the money train into reverse to save the other train, leaping onto the roof of the passenger train as the money train derails.

Slipping into the crowd at the station, the brothers come face to face with Patterson, who spits in John’s face. Fed up with his abuse, they both punch Patterson, who is arrested by Grace for endangering the passengers' lives. The brothers emerge in Times Square as the new year begins, but their celebration turns to bickering as John realizes Charlie has kept over $500,000 from the money train.

== Cast ==
- Wesley Snipes as Officer John Robinson
- Woody Harrelson as Officer Charlie Robinson
- Jennifer Lopez as Officer Grace Santiago
- Robert Blake as Captain Donald Patterson
- Chris Cooper as Terry "The Torch" Edwards
- Joe Grifasi as Riley
- Vincent Pastore as Gambler
- Scott Sowers as Mr. Brown
- Skipp Sudduth as Kowalski
- Aida Turturro as Woman on Platform
- Enrico Colantoni as Dooley

== Production ==
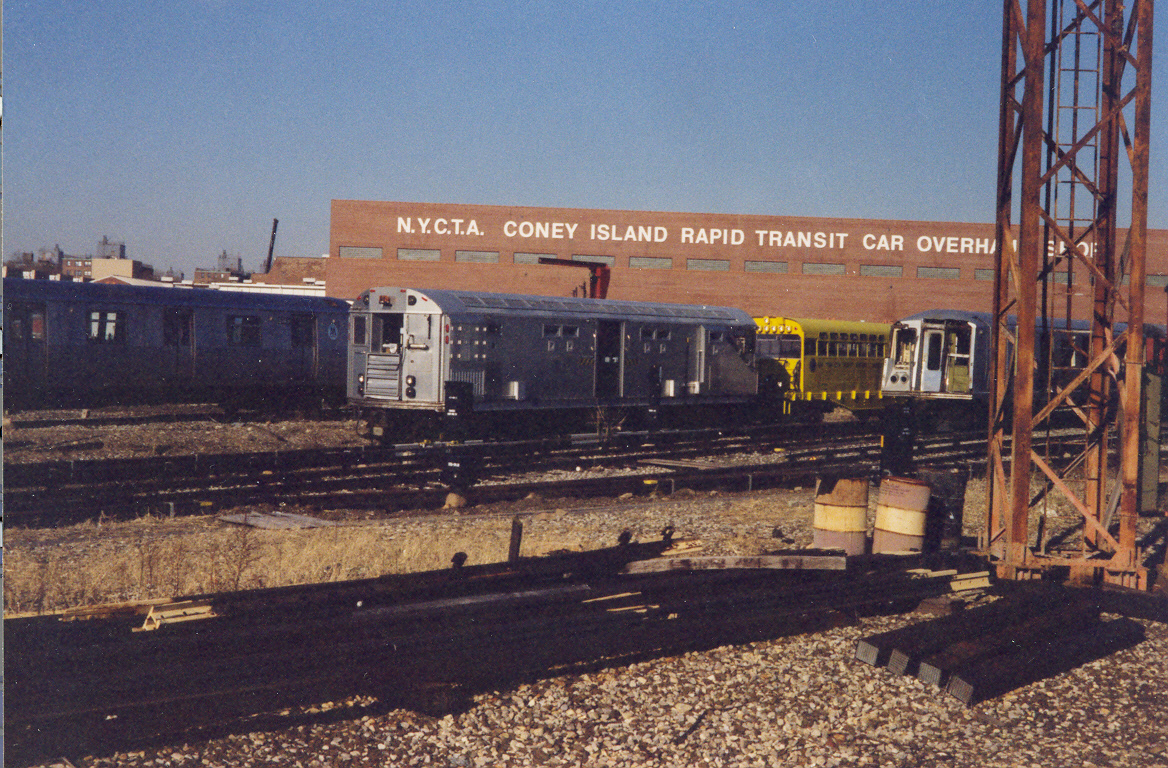
A former R21 car was rebuilt for use in the film. After production, the car was donated to the New York Transit Museum.

Wesley Snipes and Woody Harrelson had appeared together in the 1992 hit White Men Can't Jump. They were both paid $5.5 million to star in Money Train.

The subway car used as the money train in the film is a modified R21 subway car. The rolling stock was modified by the Metropolitan Transportation Authority and film crew into an imposing subway train covered in silver armor plating and equipped with flashing orange lights and sliding barred doors, like those on a jail cell. After production, the car was donated to the New York Transit Museum, and is currently stored at the Coney Island Complex as of February 2010. Other cars were used as props in the movie.

Four additional R30s were used for filming on New York City Subway property, including for the crash between the money train and the 1220 Coney Island. These four cars were 8463, 8510, 8558, and 8569.

The actual money train resembled a normal maintenance train painted yellow with black diagonal stripes. The New York City subway system retired its money trains in 2006, as the introduction of the MetroCard and computerized vending machines that allowed fare payment by credit card have dramatically reduced the number of coins stored in subway stations. Two money train cars were later sent to the New York Transit Museum.

== Music ==
The original music score by Mark Mancina was released in March 2011 by La-La Land Records as a limited edition of 3000 copies. The album features approximately 41 minutes of music across 17 tracks. Additional music was composed by John Van Tongeren. The movie also includes a cover of the 1966 song 'The Train Is Coming' by Ken Boothe, sung by Boothe and Shaggy, sung over the end credits, which was released as a single at the time of the movie's release. A hit rap single from Skee-Lo with upbeat track; Top of the Stairs on the Original Movie Soundtrack.

== Reception ==
=== Box office ===
The film took in $35.4 million at the North American box office, including $10.6 million on its opening weekend, ranking fourth behind Toy Story, GoldenEye and Ace Ventura: When Nature Calls. In 2005, USA Today characterized it as a "bomb".

=== Critical response ===
Rotten Tomatoes, a review aggregator, reports that 22% of 32 surveyed critics gave the film a positive review; the average rating was 4.3/10. The site's consensus states: "Loud, incoherent, and aimless, Money Train reunites Snipes and Harrelson – and proves that starring duos are far from immune to the law of diminishing returns."

On At the Movies, Gene Siskel felt that Snipes and Harrelson had none of the chemistry they displayed in White Men Can't Jump due to the weak dialogue and screenplay. His colleague Roger Ebert dismissed the film as a poor installment of the "endlessly recycled cop buddy formula," and both critics included Money Train on their "Worst Films of 1995" lists. Brian Lowry of Variety wrote that Money Train "bounces along with a lame script and inconsistent pace". Hal Hinson of The Washington Post called it a feeble and clichéd buddy film. Filmink said the film "exemplifies bloated dumb '90s action. J Lo is good though." Ken Tucker of Entertainment Weekly rated it D+ and called it "a big, noisy headache of a movie."

In a positive review, Stephen Holden of The New York Times wrote, "More viscerally charged than Speed and hipper than Die Hard with a Vengeance, the movie is a careening, screeching joyride that showers sparks like fireworks." Mick LaSalle of the San Francisco Examiner called it "a cut above the usual" buddy cop film due to the stars' chemistry and its well-crafted action scenes. Kenneth Turan of the Los Angeles Times described it as "a by-the-numbers action-buddy picture" that is "an acceptable if undemanding venture".

Years after the release of Money Train, Woody Harrelson expressed disappointment with the film, feeling that it failed to recapture the chemistry he shared with Wesley Snipes in White Men Can't Jump. Harrelson later described the production as one where the actors felt like "cogs in a wheel".

In addition to its poor reviews, the film was vilified for its portrayal of "The Torch" robbing a ticket booth by running a rubber tube around the bulletproof partition and dousing the attendant with a flammable liquid, then threatening to set them on fire. Seven similar crimes were repeated in real life during the film's release, although police did not conclude that the crimes were related. Nevertheless, many people, including presidential candidate Bob Dole, called for a boycott of the film. In response to the controversy of the character he portrayed, Chris Cooper admitted that he regretted participating in this film.

== See also ==
- Kingston–Throop Avenues (IND Fulton Street Line)
