= Barry Johnson (artist) =

American artist

barry johnson
- Born: Topeka, Kansas
- Education: Emporia State University
- Occupations: Artist, writer

Barry Johnson (stylized by the artist as barry johnson, using all lower-case letters) is an American artist and writer.

== Early life ==
Johnson was born and raised in Topeka, Kansas. He graduated from Emporia State University, majoring in business and marketing. Following his education, he worked in volunteer recruitment for the American Red Cross in Seattle, and then for Deloitte. After a few years in the consulting field, he started a full-time career as an artist, after teaching himself draw through online tutorials and books, in order to take up painting in his spare time as a release from work.

== Art career ==
Johnson works in a variety of mediums, including murals, sketching, photography, painting, and sculpture. Many of his paintings are untitled. In 2016 his work Word Is consisted of ten thousand cards with print-outs of tweets about Black Lives Matter scattered throughout the gallery space, an example of his mixture of art and activism. Johnson's work orients his identified mission of "Community, Culture, and Connection". In 2017 his work was the subject of a solo exhibition at the Center on Contemporary Art in Seattle, as well as appearing in the group exhibition Bloodlines at the ArtXchange gallery. In 2018 his works were shown in the solo exhibition I'm F.I.N.E in Tacoma, Washington. Many of the works in the show were inspired by American soul music. That year he also showed works at the Onyx gallery and Kent Summer Arts Exhibition, in addition to providing a TEDx talk on his process.

In 2019 his paintings were a part of an exhibition put on by the Pierce County Aids Foundation. In 2020, johnson became a part of the Vivid Matter Collective, which created activism through art in the City of Seattle. He painted the "E" in the Black Lives Matter mural created during the brief period CHOP existed in Seattle.

== Process ==
Some of Johnson's works have included accompanied texts describing his "detailing times, ideas, external influences and his own internal state during the creative process." He has stated that his use of the text aids in his intention to tell a story through his art. His work is inter-disciplinary and uses a variety of tradition and atypical mediums. Others have said of his work that, "The fluidity of his art allows Barry to work across painting, sculpture, installation, film and fashion."

== Writing ==
Johnson has also worked as a children's book author, writing and illustrating the book Oh What Wonderful Hair, based on his experiences with his daughter.
