= The Movement (dance band) =

American techno group

- Origin: Los Angeles, California, United States
- Genres: Techno
- Years active: 1992–1994
- Label: Arista
- Past members: AJ Mora; Richard Vission; DJ Hazze

The Movement was an American techno band from Los Angeles, California consisting of Costa Rican-born AJ Mora, Canadian-born Richard "Humpty" Vission and DJ Hazze. The band was only active from 1992 into 1994.

== Musical career ==
The Movement is generally considered a one-hit wonder. Their first single, released on Kahn's L.A.-based Sunshine record label, was "Jump!" in 1992. The record reached number one on Billboard Magazine's Hot Dance Club Play chart. It also reached the top 10 on the magazine's Hot 12" Sales chart, crossed over to pop radio, hitting number 53 on the Billboard Hot 100 singles chart, albeit with a re-working of the chorus ("Jump Motherfucker Jump!" which became "Jump Everybody Jump!"). Kahn signed a deal with Arista Records in New York to distribute the single and the subsequent album, which he also produced.

The song "Jump" included a sample of the hit "Tu Pum Pum" by Panamanian rapper El General, courtesy of New Creations Enterprises.

Kahn continued to produce and release artists on the Sunshine label, including Skee-Lo, whose rap single "I Wish" was hugely successful before jointly re-releasing the single on the Sunshine and Scotti Bros. label, along with Skee-Lo's first album, also produced by Kahn, which was nominated for a Grammy as Best Rap Album.

Vission continues to be a successful producer, remixer and DJ, and he had more dance and Hot 100 hits in 1998 as a member of Pure Sugar.

== Discography ==
=== Studio albums ===
- The Movement (1992)

=== EPs ===
- The Movement (1993)

=== Singles ===
List of singles, with selected chart positions
Title	Year	Peak chart positions				Album
Title	Year	US	AUS	SWE	UK	Album
"Jump!"	1992	53	7	26	57	The Movement
"B.I.N.G.O."	1992	—	84	—	—	The Movement
"Shake That"	1993	—	—	—	—	The Movement
"Bounce"	1994	—	—	—	—	Non-album single

== See also ==
- List of number-one dance hits (United States)
- List of artists who reached number one on the US Dance chart
