= Smooth Sax Tribute to Earth, Wind and Fire =

Studio album by Various Artists
- Released: May 11, 2004
- Genre: Pop/Rock
- Label: Tribute Records

Smooth Sax Tribute to Earth, Wind and Fire is a tribute album to the R&B band Earth, Wind & Fire by Keyboardist Todd Burrell and Keyboard and Saxophone player Walter Chancellor Jr. The album was released on May 11, 2004, on Tribute Records and was produced by both Burrell and Chancellor Jr.

== Track listing ==
1. "Shining Star" 4:42
2. "Reasons" 4:32
3. "Devotion" 4:21
4. "September" 4:12
5. "Can't Hide Love" 4:17
6. "Sing a Song" 4:08
7. "That's the Way of the World 4:47
8. "Serpentine Fire" 4:18
9. "Let's Groove" 4:14
10. "Getaway 4:32
