= Twennynine with Lenny White =

Studio album by Twennynine with Lenny White
- Released: November 1980
- Studio: Indigo Ranch, CA
- Genre: Funk; R&B
- Length: 36:29
- Label: Elektra
- Producer: Larry Dunn; Lenny White

Twennynine with Lenny White chronology
Best of Friends (1979)	Twennynine with Lenny White (1980)	Just Like Dreamin (1981)

Professional ratings
Review scores
Source	Rating
AllMusic	4/5 stars

Twennynine with Lenny White is the second album by American R&B band Twennynine, released in November 1980 on Elektra Records. It was produced by Lenny White and Larry Dunn. The album reached No. 22 on the Billboard Top R&B Albums chart.

== Singles ==
The single, "Kid Stuff", peaked at No. 19 on the Billboard Hot Soul Singles chart. "Fancy Dancer" reached No. 17 on the Billboard Hot Dance Club Play chart and No. 25 on the Hot Soul Songs chart.

== Track listing ==
No.	Title	Writer(s)	Length
1.	"Just Right for Me"	Denzil Miller	3:58
2.	"It's Music, It's Magic"	Lenny White	4:51
3.	"My Melody"	Denzil Miller, Lenny White, Tanya Willoughby	4:05
4.	"Kid Stuff"	Skip Anderson, Eddie Martinez, Denzil Miller, Lenny White	3:50
5.	"Fancy Dancer"	Larry Dunn, Denzil Miller, Lenny White	3:40
6.	"Love and Be Loved"	Skip Anderson	3:39
7.	"Back to You"	Skip Anderson, Bill Champlin, Lenny White	3:47
8.	"Slip Away"	Steve Horton, Barry Sonjohn Johnson	3:40
9.	"We Had to Break Away"		3:33
10.	"The 11th Fanfare"	Denzil Miller	1:26
