= Venusian Summer =

Studio album by Lenny White
- Released: 1975
- Recorded: June–August 1975
- Studios: Electric Lady Studios, New York City; Different Fur, San Francisco
- Genres: Jazz fusion, jazz-funk
- Label: Nemperor
- Producer: Lenny White

Lenny White chronology
Venusian Summer (1975)	Big City (1977)

Venusian Summer is the debut solo album by American drummer Lenny White, released in 1975 by Nemperor Records. Recorded while White was a member of Return to Forever, the album features musicians including Al Di Meola, Larry Coryell, Hubert Laws, Doug Rauch, Doug Rodrigues, Larry Young, Jimmy Smith, David Sancious and Onaje Allan Gumbs.

== Background and recording ==
Venusian Summer was recorded in June and August 1975 at Electric Lady Studios in New York City and Different Fur in San Francisco.

White produced the album and played drums, percussion, keyboards and synthesizers. Musicians include guitarists Larry Coryell, Al Di Meola, Doug Rodrigues and Ray Gomez, bassist Doug Rauch, keyboardists Onaje Allan Gumbs, David Sancious, Weldon Irvine and Don Blackman, organists Larry Young and Jimmy Smith, flutist Hubert Laws, and synthesizer players Patrick Gleeson and Peter Robinson.

"Chicken-Fried Steak" was written by Rauch and Rodrigues, who played bass and guitar on the track. Rauch, Rodrigues and White wrote "Away Go Troubles Down the Drain".

== Music ==
The first side opens with "Chicken-Fried Steak" and "Away Go Troubles Down the Drain", followed by the two-part "Venusian Summer Suite". The second side consists of "Prelude to Rainbow Delta", "Mating Drive" and "Prince of the Sea".

The Ann Arbor News described "Chicken Fried Steak" and "Away Go Troubles Down the Drain" as "earthy" and "funky", followed by the "complex, synthesized majesty" of the "Venusian Summer Suite". The review noted the Brooklyn Synharmonic Orchestra and Inner Mission Choir on the suite and described the second side as having a Return to Forever flavor.

"Mating Drive" includes Rauch on bass, Rodrigues and Ray Gomez on guitar, Larry Young on organ and Onaje Allan Gumbs on keyboards. "Prince of the Sea" features Coryell and Di Meola on guitar.

== Reception ==
Billboard noted White's composing as well as his drumming and described the album as incorporating jazz-rock and electronic music.

Cash Box called Venusian Summer "food for musical thought".

Record World described "Away Go Troubles Down the Drain" and "Chicken-Fried Steak" as funky, "The Venusian Summer Suite" as impressionistic and "Mating Drive" as "Mahavishnu-like jazz-rock". It described "Prince of the Sea" as more fluid.

The Ann Arbor News rated the recording "Excellent" and the performance "Dynamic". The review said that the album showed White's abilities as a composer and arranger as well as a drummer, and noted the stylistic differences between the funk-oriented opening tracks, the synthesized "Venusian Summer Suite", and the Return to Forever-influenced second side. It described the performances by musicians including Hubert Laws, Doug Rauch, Larry Young and Jimmy Smith as dynamic and called the sound "superb".

Mike Diana of the Daily Press praised White's drumming and compositions. He described "Away Go Troubles Down the Drain" as a funk number that moves into the "Venusian Summer Suite", and "Mating Drive" as "straight, '70s jazz-rock". Diana noted the guitar duet between Larry Coryell and Al Di Meola on "Prince of the Sea" and concluded that White was "a talent that the jazz/rock fusion cannot do without".

AllMusic's Robert Taylor described Venusian Summer as one of the better releases from a fusion genre that he considered to be growing tired. Taylor praised White’s feel for funk and his restraint as a player. Taylor called it "a must-have fusion recording".

== Track listing ==
Side one
No.	Title	Writer(s)	Length
1.	"Chicken-Fried Steak"	Doug Rauch, Doug Rodrigues	4:33
2.	"Away Go Troubles Down the Drain"	Rauch, Rodrigues, Lenny White	3:31
3.	"The Venusian Summer Suite, Part 1: Sirenes"	White	4:28
4.	"The Venusian Summer Suite, Part 2: Venusian Summer"	White	6:38

Side two
No.	Title	Writer(s)	Length
1.	"Prelude to Rainbow Delta"	Patrick Gleeson	1:10
2.	"Mating Drive"	White	7:40
3.	"Prince of the Sea"	White	11:37

== Personnel ==
Credits adapted from AllMusic.

=== Musicians ===
- Lenny White – drums, percussion, keyboards, synthesizers, piano, marimba
- Doug Rauch – bass, arranger
- Doug Rodrigues – guitar
- Ray Gomez – guitar
- Larry Coryell – guitar
- Al Di Meola – guitar
- Onaje Allan Gumbs – keyboards, piano, organ, clavinet, Mellotron
- David Sancious – keyboards, organ, synthesizer
- Don Blackman – keyboards, synthesizer
- Weldon Irvine – keyboards, organ
- Jimmy Smith – organ
- Larry Young – organ
- Hubert Laws – flute
- Tom Harrell – synthesizer
- Patrick Gleeson – synthesizer, keyboards
- Peter Robinson – keyboards, synthesizer

=== Production ===
- Lenny White – producer
- Dennis MacKay – engineer, remixing
- Dane Butcher – engineer
- Abie Sussman – design
- Dennis Chalkin – photography
