= Bernard Wright =

American musician (1963–2022)

- Also known as: Nard
- Born: November 16, 1963; Jamaica, Queens, New York, U.S.
- Died: May 19, 2022 (aged 58) Dallas, Texas, U.S.
- Genres: Gospel; post-disco; funk; jazz; contemporary R&B; jazz fusion
- Occupations: Musician; singer; songwriter
- Instruments: Keyboards; vocals
- Years active: 1980–2022
- Labels: Manhattan/EMI; Arista; GRP/MCA

Bernard Wright (November 16, 1963 – May 19, 2022) was an American funk and jazz keyboardist and singer who began his career as a session musician and later released four solo albums.

== Biography ==
Wright was born in Jamaica, Queens, New York. In the liner notes to his debut album 'Nard, he stated that his mother is Lessie Wright. His godmother was singer Roberta Flack.

He attended the High School of Performing Arts in New York. His classmates included writer Carl Hancock Rux and gospel recording artist Desiree Coleman Jackson. He was offered a slot touring with Lenny White when he was 12, and he played with Tom Browne at the age of 16.

GRP Records signed him in 1981 and released his debut album 'Nard, tracks from which were prominently sampled in hits by Dr. Dre, Snoop Dogg, Skee-Lo, and LL Cool J. The album was re-released in 2001. He followed with Funky Beat (1983) on Arista and Mr. Wright (1985) on Manhattan Records. The latter of these albums included his biggest R&B appearance, "Who Do You Love", for which a video was made that is featured in the title sequence of Video Music Box. The female vocalist was Marla Adler. In 1990 he released the gospel album Fresh Hymns, followed by Brand New Gospel Format in 1991, and Fresh Hymns II in 1992. He released an album with Sadao Watanabe, titled Go Straight Ahead' N Make a Left, in 1997. In 2000 he formed a trio with Alfredo Elias and Damon Banks and released the album Back to Our Roots.

Wright also appeared on recordings by musicians including Miami Mike Devine Pennington, Doug E. Fresh, Cameo, Bobby Brown, Pieces of a Dream, Charles Earland, Marcus Miller, and Miles Davis. After his recording days, Wright continued playing keyboards in Dallas, where he mentored younger artists.

Bernard Wright died on May 19, 2022 at the age of 58 after being hit by a car while crossing a street in Dallas. He was married to Anita Wright for nearly 40 years and is survived by his children Bernard Jr., Christopher, and Victoria Wright.

== Discography ==
=== Albums ===
Year	Title	Peak chart positions		
Year	Title	US	US R&B	US Jazz
1981	'Nard	116	53	7
1983	Funky Beat	—	58	—
1985	Mr. Wright	—	25	—
1990	Fresh Hymns	—	—	—
1991	Brand New Gospel Format	—	—	—
1992	Fresh Hymns II	—	—	—
"—" denotes releases that did not chart.

=== Singles ===
Year	Title	Peak chart positions	
Year	Title	US R&B	US Dance
1981	"Just Chillin' Out"	33	85
1981	"Haboglabotribin'"	78	—
1982	"Won't You Let Me Love You"	88	—
1983	"Funky Beat"	39	—
1985	"Who Do You Love"	6	44
1985	"After You"	23	—
1985	"Yo 'Nard"	—	—
"—" denotes releases that did not chart.
