= Skee-Lo =

American rapper (born 1975)

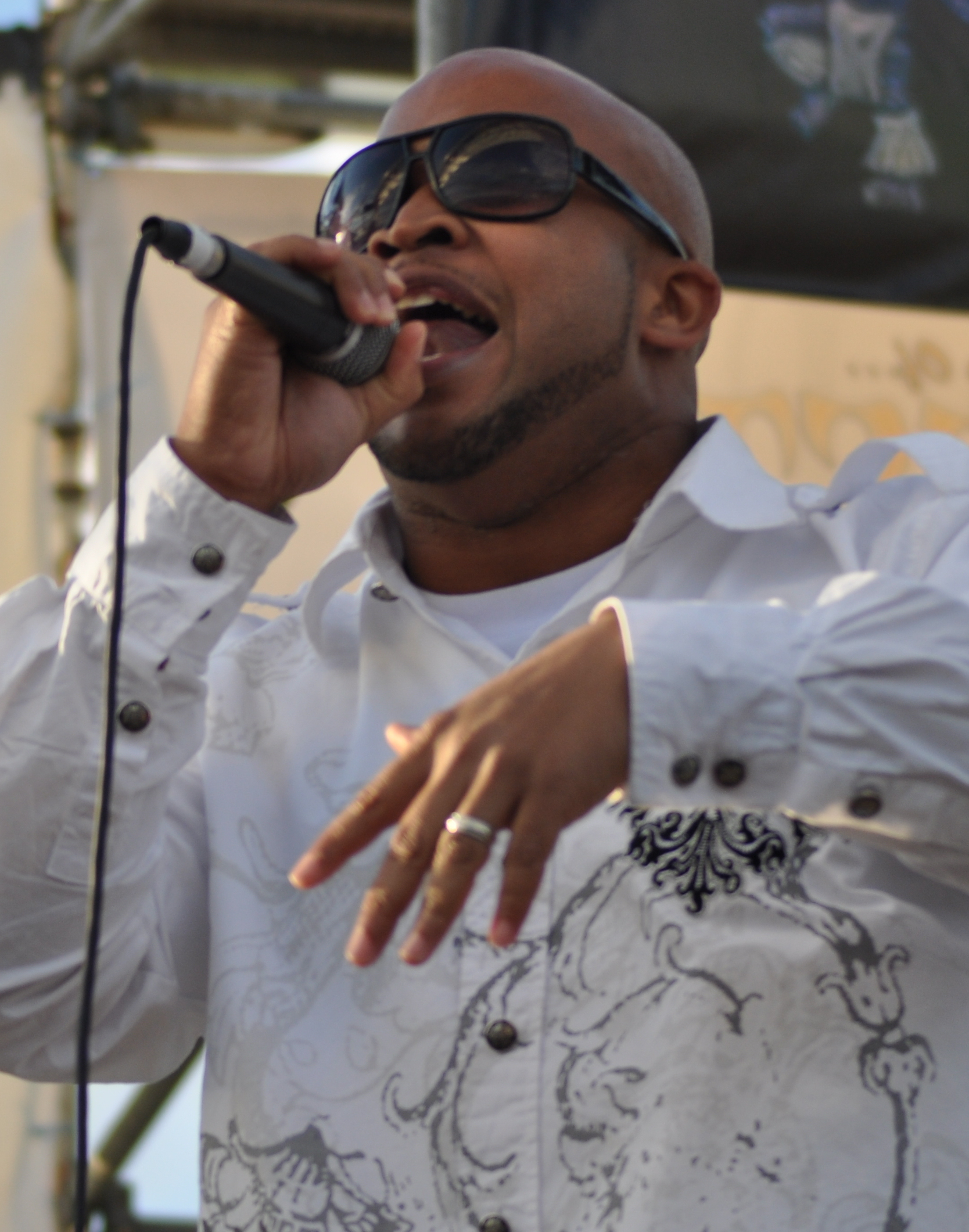
- Skee-Lo performing at Seattle Hempfest in 2010

Background information
- Also known as: Tha Skee-lo
- Born: Antoine Roundtree; March 27, 1975 (age 51); Chicago, Illinois, U.S.
- Origin: Riverside, California, U.S.
- Genre: Hip-hop
- Occupations: Rapper; singer; songwriter; record producer
- Years active: 1994–2013; 2024
- Labels: Skeelo Musik LLC; Scotti Brothers

Antoine Roundtree (born March 27, 1975), better known by his stage name Skee-Lo, is an American rapper best known for his 1995 song "I Wish", which became a hit in several countries and reached No. 13 on the Billboard Hot 100.

The song was known for its lack of explicit lyrics at a time when gangsta rap was very popular. His debut album of the same title was released shortly thereafter, earning him two Grammy nominations for both the album and single. Afterwards, he stopped his rapping career before coming back to release a new album in 2000 and another in 2012.

== Early life and education ==
Born in Chicago, Illinois, Roundtree and his family subsequently relocated to Poughkeepsie, New York before then moving to Riverside, California when he was nine. He first started rapping in 1983.

He graduated from Canyon Springs High School in Moreno Valley before moving to Los Angeles in 1993. He attended El Camino College. At about this time, he converted to Islam and joined the Nation of Islam.

== Career ==
He first made his couple debuts in the Good Life Cafe in the early 1990s. Skee-Lo's debut album I Wish was released in 1995, which he first started working on in 1993. The album was a huge success. One of the singles, "Top of the Stairs", was featured in the ending credits as well as the soundtrack to the 1995 film Money Train. He quietly "retired" from rapping five months after the album's release because of a dispute with label Sunshine Records. Skee-Lo claims Sunshine Records took all the credit from the album's success, and he did not make a single cent from it. "So I refused to shoot any more videos, promote or record music. I'm not their slave. I wasn't working for free." After many years, he eventually won the rights against the label in court.

Skee-Lo recorded a cover of the Schoolhouse Rock! song "The Tale of Mr. Morton", which taught sentence structure (subject, verb and predicate). The song appears on the 1996 compilation album, Schoolhouse Rock! Rocks.

In 1996, Skee-Lo became a VJ for both MTV's The Beach House and The Grind.

He co-wrote "I'll Be Your Everything" by boy band Youngstown. The song is featured on the 1999 Inspector Gadget movie soundtrack.

In 2011, he wrote "Burnin' Up" as part of the soundtrack of the 2013 horror movie Killer Holiday from Lionsgate Entertainment. MTV produced a music video directed by Marty Thomas that was filmed at actor Howie Mandel's house, which was rented by his son to MTV without Mandel's knowledge. It was released under his own indie label, Skeelo Musik.

Skee-Lo made a guest appearance on a track "Now You See My Life" with former Hollywood Undead rapper Deuce from Deuce's album Nine Lives in 2012.

He released his third album, Fresh Ideas, on his own label Skeelo Musik, via iTunes on November 13, 2012. It appeared in stores July 9, 2013.

In 2023, Shaquille O’Neal and Skee-Lo recreated “I Wish” in a new ad for Pepsi.

In 2024, after an 11-year break, he released a new single "Slow Down" independently on Bandcamp.

== Personal life ==
He and his wife, Stacy Ambrose, resided in Los Angeles with their five children. Ambrose died from cardiovascular disease on August 22, 2025.

== Discography ==
=== Studio albums ===
List of studio albums, with selected chart positions and certifications
Title	Album details	Peak chart positions				Certifications
Title	Album details	US	US R&B	GER	NLD	Certifications
I Wish	Released: June 27, 1995; Label: Scotti Brothers	53	37	71	61	RIAA: Gold
Fresh Ideas	Released: November 13, 2012; Label: Skeelo Musik	—	—	—	—	
"—" denotes items which were not released in that country or failed to chart.

=== Singles ===
List of singles, with selected chart positions and certifications, showing year released and album name
Title	Year	Peak chart positions									Certifications	Album
Title	Year	US	US R&B	US Rap	AUS	DEN	NZ	SWE	UK	UK R&B	Certifications	Album
"I Wish"	1995	13	33	8	74	12	14	4	15	3	RIAA: Gold; BPI: Platinum	I Wish
"Top of the Stairs"	1995	— (Note: "Top of the Stairs" did not enter the Billboard Hot 100, but peaked at number 12 on the Bubbling Under Hot 100 Singles chart.)	73	—	—	—	—	—	38	6		I Wish
"Holdin' On"	1996	—	—	—	—	—	—	—	—	—		I Wish
"Superman"	1996	—	—	—	—	—	—	—	—	—		I Wish
"I Can't Stop"	2000	—	—	—	—	—	—	—	—	—		—N/a
"At the Mall"	2001	—	—	—	—	—	—	—	—	—		—N/a
"Bounce Back"	2001	—	—	—	—	—	—	—	—	—		—N/a
"Overdose"	2010	—	—	—	—	—	—	—	—	—		Non-album single
"I Love LA"	2012	—	—	—	—	—	—	—	—	—		Fresh Ideas
"A Little More Hip-Hop" (with Alex Sheridan, Chiba & Doc Ice)	2012	—	—	—	—	—	—	—	—	—		Non-album single
"Vibe Is Right"	2013	—	—	—	—	—	—	—	—	—		Fresh Ideas
"Slow Down"	2024	—	—	—	—	—	—	—	—	—		Non-album single
"—" denotes items which were not released in that country or failed to chart.

=== Music videos ===
Year	Video	Director
1995	"I Wish"	Marty Thomas
1995	"Top of the Stairs"	Marty Thomas
1996	"Holdin' On"	Marty Thomas
2001	"At The Mall"	Marty Thomas
2011	"Burnin' Up"	Marty Thomas
2013	"Vibe Is Right"	Henry Zavala
2015	"Raw"	Stacy Ambrose & Antoine X
