= Lenny White =

American drummer (born 1949)

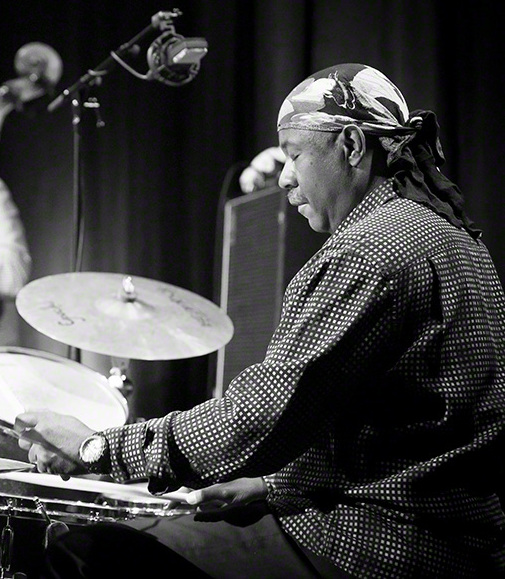
- White at the Oslo Jazz Festival 2016

Background information
- Born: Leonard White III; December 19, 1949 (age 76); New York City, U.S.
- Genres: Jazz; funk; jazz fusion; jazz funk; jazz rock; progressive rock
- Occupations: Musician; songwriter; bandleader
- Instruments: Drums, percussion
- Years active: 1968–present
- Website: lennywhite.com

Leonard White III (born December 19, 1949) is an American jazz fusion drummer who was a member of the band Return to Forever led by Chick Corea in the 1970s. White has been called "one of the founding fathers of jazz fusion".

White has won three Grammys and one Latin Grammy. His song Algorithm Takedown won Best Song at the Cannes World Film Festival in 2023.

== Early life and education ==
Born in Queens, New York City, White became interested in music at a young age. While he was living at home, his father would take him to jazz gigs. A self-taught drummer, he started playing with groups on the New York jazz scene. Early on, he played clubs such as the Aphrodisiac, Slugs, and The Gold Lounge. He has expressed admiration for drummers Kenny Clarke, Max Roach, Art Blakey, Philly Joe Jones, Roy Haynes, Elvin Jones, and Tony Williams, all of whom he dedicated a piece he titled "Magnificent Seven" to.

It was at The Gold Lounge where he had his first gig with saxophonist Jackie McLean. During the late 1960s he began performing with McLean around Queens. Through this, White was recommended to play on Miles Davis' landmark 1969 LP Bitches Brew and feature on Freddie Hubbard's 1970 LP Red Clay. During 1972, White joined Return to Forever.

== Career ==
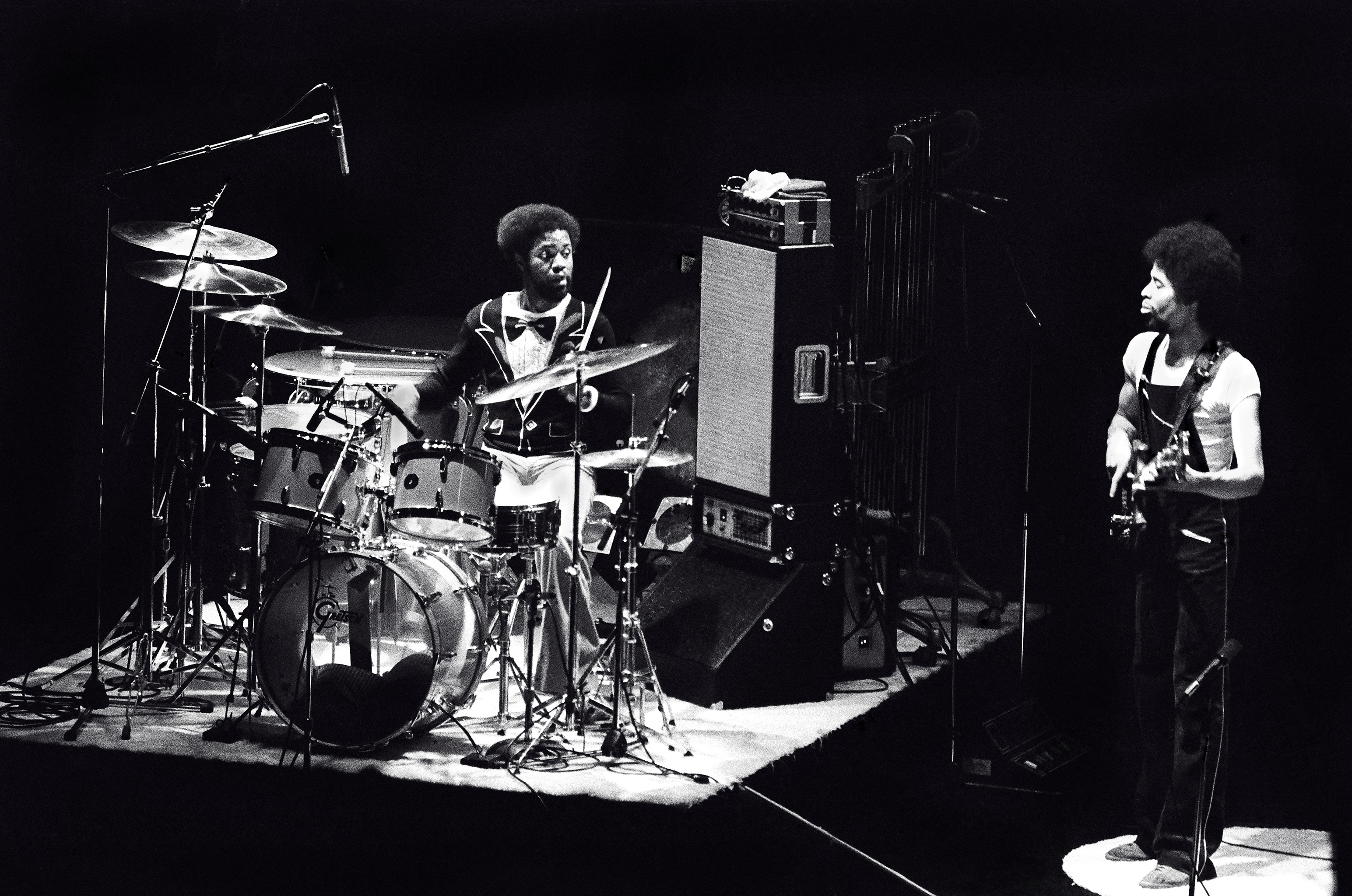
White and Stanley Clarke, 1976

In 1975 White released his debut solo album entitled ‘’Venusian Summer,’’which featured guitarists Al Di Meola and fusion guitar pioneer, Larry Coryell. His second solo album, Big City, was released in 1977. During 1978 he released his Space opera inspired The Adventures of Astral Pirates and his third solo album Streamline. He eventually formed the jazz/soul group Twennynine who went on to issue three studio albums, 1979's Best of Friends, Twennynine with Lenny White in 1980, and 1981's Just Like Dreamin'.

White then made a guest appearance on Chick Corea's 1982 album Touchstone and produced Chaka Khan's 1982 LP Echoes of an Era. He also co-produced, with EW&F's Maurice White, Pieces of a Dream's 1986 LP Joyride and later released his 1995 album Present Tense. White now teaches at NYU Steinhardt where he has an ensemble as well as a lecture class on Bitches Brew called “The Miles Davis Aesthetic.”

== Personal life ==
White has been a longtime resident of Teaneck, New Jersey. He endorses Vic Firth drum sticks and only plays his own signature epoch cymbals sponsored by Istanbul Agop.

== Awards and honors ==
Grammy Awards

White has earned two sole Grammy Award nominations, while winning a total of three.

| Year | Nominee / work | Award | Result |
|---|---|---|---|
| 1975 | No Mystery | Best Jazz Performance by a group | Won |
| 2010 | The Stanley Clarke Band | Best Contemporary Jazz Album | Won |
| 2011 | Forever | Best Jazz Instrumental Album | Won |

Latin Grammy Awards

White has been nominated for and won one Latin Grammy Award.

| Year | Nominee / work | Award | Result |
|---|---|---|---|
| 2011 | Forever | Best Instrumental Album | Won |

Cannes World Film Festival 2023

Best Song Winner with Algorithm Takedown

== Discography ==
=== As leader/co-leader ===
- Venusian Summer (Nemperor, 1976) – rec. 1975
- Big City (Nemperor, 1977)
- The Adventures of Astral Pirates (Elektra, 1978)
- Streamline (Elektra, 1978)
- Attitude (Wounded Bird, 1983)
- In Clinic (DCI, 1983)
- Present Tense (Hip Bop, 1995)
- Renderers of Spirit (Hip Bop Essence, 1996)
- Edge (Hip Bop, 1998)
- Collection (Hip Bop, 2002)
- The Love Has Never Gone: Tribute to Earth, Wind & Fire (Trauma, 2004)
- Hancock Island (Chesky, 2008)
- Anomaly (Abstract Logix, 2010)
- Lenny White Live (BFM Jazz, 2013)

Collaborations
With Chaka Khan, Freddie Hubbard, Joe Henderson, Chick Corea and Stanley Clarke

- Echoes of an Era (Elektra, 1982)
- Echoes of an Era 2 – The Concert (Elektra, 1982)

=== As a member ===
Return to Forever
With Chick Corea, Bill Connors and Stanley Clarke

- Hymn of the Seventh Galaxy (Polydor, 1973)

With Chick Corea, Al Di Meola and Stanley Clarke

- Where Have I Known You Before (Polydor, 1974)
- No Mystery (Polydor, 1975)
- Romantic Warrior (Columbia, 1976)
- Returns (Eagle, 2009)

As Corea, Clarke & White

- Forever (Concord, 2009)

With Chick Corea, Stanley Clarke, Jean-Luc Ponty, Frank Gambale

- The Mothership Returns (Eagle, 2012)

Azteca

- Azteca (Columbia, 1972)
- Pyramid of the Moon (Columbia, 1973)
- From The Ruins (in-akustik, 2008) – rec. 2007

The Manhattan Project
(With Wayne Shorter, Michel Petrucciani, Stanley Clarke, Gil Goldstein and Pete Levin)

- The Manhattan Project (Blue Note, 1990) – rec. 1989

=== As producer ===
- Sylvia St. James, Magic (Elektra, 1981)
- Chaka Khan, Echoes of an Era (Elektra, 1982)
- Tina Harris, I must not be kinky (Shanachie, 1985)
- Nicki Richards, Naked (To the World) (Elektra, 1991)
- Letizia Gambi, Introducing Letizia Gambi (Jando Music / Via Veneto Jazz, 2012)
- Letizia Gambi, Blue Monday (RP / IYOUWE, 2016)

=== As sideman ===
With Geri Allen

- Some Aspects of Water (Storyville, 1997) – live rec. 1996
- The Gathering (Verve, 1998)

With Cyrus Chestnut

- Natural Essence (HighNote, 2016)
- There's a Sweet, Sweet Spirit (HighNote, 2017)

With Stanley Clarke

- Children of Forever (Polydor, 1973)
- Journey to Love (Nemperor, 1975)
- The Stanley Clarke Trio, Jazz in the Garden (Heads Up, 2009)

With Larry Coryell & Victor Bailey

- Electric (Chesky, 2005)
- Traffic (Chesky, 2006)

With Letizia Gambi

- Introducing Letizia Gambi (2012)(Jando Music/Via Veneto Jazz)
- Blue Monday (RP / IYOUWE, 2016)

With Al Di Meola

- Land of the Midnight Sun (Columbia, 1976)
- Elegant Gypsy (Columbia, 1977)

With Wallace Roney

- Village (Warner Bros., 1997) – rec. 1996
- No Room for Argument (Stretch, 2000)
- A Place in Time (HighNote, 2016)

With Twennynine

- Best of Friends (Elektra, 1979)
- Twennynine with Lenny White (Elektra, 1980)
- Just Like Dreamin' (Elektra, 1981)

With Buster Williams

- Houdini (Sirocco, 2001) – rec. 2000
- Griot Libertè (HighNote, 2004)
- 65 Roses (BluePort Jazz, 2008) – rec. 2006

With others

- 1969: Andrew Hill, Passing Ships (Blue Note, 2003)
- 1969: Miles Davis, Bitches Brew (Columbia, 1970)[2LP]
- 1970: Joe Henderson, If You're Not Part of the Solution, You're Part of the Problem (Milestone, 1970) – live
- 1970: Freddie Hubbard, Red Clay (CTI, 1970)
- 1970: Woody Shaw, Blackstone Legacy (Contemporary, 1971)
- 1971: Gato Barbieri, Fenix (Flying Dutchman, 1971)
- 1972: Buddy Terry, Pure Dynamite (Mainstream, 1972)
- 1972: Santana, Caravanserai (Columbia, 1972)
- 1973: Curtis Fuller, Crankin' (Mainstream, 1973)
- 1973: Eddie Henderson, Realization (Capricorn, 1973)
- 1975: Jaco Pastorius, Jaco Pastorius (Epic, 1976)
- 1976: Don Cherry, Hear & Now (Atlantic, 1977)
- 1977?: Brian Auger's Oblivion Express, Happiness Heartaches (Warner Bros., 1977)
- 1986: Eliane Elias, Illusions (Denon, 1986)
- 1989?: Michel Petrucciani, Music (Blue Note, 1989)
- 1993: Bobby Hutcherson, Acoustic Masters II (Atlantic, 1994)
- 1994: Marcus Miller and Michel Petrucciani, Dreyfus Night in Paris (Dreyfus Jazz, 2003) – live
- 1994?: Urbanator, Urbanator (Hip Bop, 1994)
- 1999?: Vertú, Vertú (Sony, 1999)
- 2001: Ron Carter, Stardust (Somethin' Else, 2001)
- 2008?: Marica Hiraga, Batucada: Jazz'n Bossa (B.J.L., 2008)
- 2010: Jamey Haddad, Explorations in Space and Time (Chesky, 2013)
- 2011: Chick Corea, The Musician (Stretch, 2016)[3CD]
- 2015: Cyrus Chestnut, Natural Essence (Highnote, 2016)
- 2019: Charles Tolliver, Connect (Gearbox, 2020)
- 2021?: Kenny Garrett, Sounds from the Ancestors (Mack Avenue, 2021)
- 2022: Eddie Henderson, Witness to History (Smoke Sessions, 2022)
