= The Best of Mickey Hart: Over the Edge and Back =

Compilation album by Mickey Hart
- Released: April 23, 2002
- Recorded: 1976 – 1998
- Genre: World music
- Length: 46:48
- Label: Rykodisc
- Producer: Mickey Hart

Mickey Hart chronology
Spirit into Sound (2000)	The Best of Mickey Hart: Over the Edge and Back (2002)	Global Drum Project (2007)

The Best of Mickey Hart: Over the Edge and Back is a retrospective album by Mickey Hart. It was released by Rykodisc Records on April 23, 2002, in two formats — CD, and DVD-Audio. It contains music excerpted from six of Hart's albums – Diga (1976), The Apocalypse Now Sessions (1980), At the Edge (1990), Planet Drum (1991), Mickey Hart's Mystery Box (1996), and Supralingua (1998). It also contains one previously unreleased track.

Fellow Grateful Dead members Bill Kreutzmann and Phil Lesh perform on the track "Compound", and Jerry Garcia plays guitar synthesizer on "The Eliminators".

== Creation of the album ==
Micky Hart selected the tracks for Over the Edge and Back, and remixed them in stereo for the CD, and in 5.1 surround sound for the DVD-Audio.

In a 2002 interview, Hart said, "I'm not really up for 'Best of's to be honest with you.... My stuff doesn't really play like that 'Best of' in one CD because I'm all over the map, from the rhythm to the melody and the harmony, the Apocalypse [sessions], the Olympics. I try to make it go together, but it just barely holds as a CD. If you look at it as individual tracks, they're terrific, but, usually, when you make a CD there’s a motif. Usually you compose the songs at the same time, so they have a certain kind of continuity to it. This doesn’t have that kind of continuity. So, I didn't try. I gave up on the continuity part because it covered 20 years of my life."

== Critical reception ==
Professional ratings
Review scores
Source	Rating
Allmusic	2.5/5 stars

On Allmusic, Hal Horowitz wrote, "This is a reasonable but far too brief overview of Mickey Hart's six world music releases for the Rykodisc label.... The original albums this material was extracted from are a better, more appropriate way to enjoy the music, especially considering the relatively short 47–minute playing time... As it stands, it's an adequate, listenable, but frustratingly limited taste of Mickey Hart's world music side projects."

== Track listing ==
1. "Angola" (Sikiru Adepoju, David Garibaldi, Mickey Hart, Giovanni Hidalgo, Zakir Hussain, Bakithi Kumalo) – 4:50 – from Supralingua
2. "Where Love Goes (Sito)" (Robert Hunter, Hart, The Mint Juleps, Babatunde Olatunji, Hussain, Hidalgo) – 7:34 – from Mickey Hart's Mystery Box
3. "Down the Road" (Hunter, Hart, Dave Jenkins, Vince Welnick, Hidalgo) – 5:25 – from Mickey Hart's Mystery Box
4. "Sweet Sixteen" (Hart, Hussain) – 8:05 – from Diga
5. "The Eliminators" (Creek Hart, Mickey Hart, Taro S. Hart, Jerry Garcia) – 4:49 – from At the Edge
6. "Udu Chant" (Adepoju, Hart, Hussein, Airto Moreira) – 4:14 – from Planet Drum
7. "Temple Caves" (Adepoju, Hart, Hussein, Moreira, Olatunji) – 3:20 – from Planet Drum
8. "Compound" (Hart, Mike Hinton, Moreira) – 3:18 – from The Apocalypse Now Sessions
9. "Call to All Nations" (Philip Glass, Hart, Hidalgo, Hussein) – 5:13 – previously unreleased; recorded for the opening ceremonies of the 1996 Summer Olympics

== Personnel ==
- Mickey Hart – production, mixing
- Tom Flye – mixing
- Howard Cohen – production coordinator
- Liz DeLong – production coordinator
- Ferenc Dobronyi – cover illustration
- Steven Jurgensmeyer – design
