= Global Drum Project =

Studio album by Mickey Hart, Zakir Hussain, Sikiru Adepoju, Giovanni Hidalgo
- Released: October 2, 2007
- Genre: World music
- Length: 42:00
- Label: Shout! Factory
- Producer: Mickey Hart; Zakir Hussain

Mickey Hart chronology
The Best of Mickey Hart: Over the Edge and Back (2002)	Global Drum Project (2007)	Mysterium Tremendum (2012)

Global Drum Project is an album by Mickey Hart, Zakir Hussain, Sikiru Adepoju, and Giovanni Hidalgo. It was released by Shout! Factory on October 2, 2007.

The album combines music played on a variety of drums and other instruments, human voices singing and chanting, and electronic samples and digitally created sounds. It is a blend of traditional music, influenced by Mickey Hart's musicological studies of drumming from around the world, and music created using modern computer technology.

Global Drum Project won the 2009 Grammy Award for Best Contemporary World Music Album. It reached number six on the Billboard chart for top world music albums.

== Critical reception ==
Professional ratings
Review scores
Source	Rating
The Music Box	4/5 stars
Glide	3.5/5 stars

In The Music Box, John Metzger wrote, "In crafting his latest effort Global Drum Project, Hart reunited several of the principal members that had appeared on Planet Drum, his Grammy-winning endeavor from 1991.... Global Drum Project is not, however, a simple reprise of Hart’s earlier work. Instead, it is an extension of every outing he has made. As such, it is as informed by the linguistic and technological aspects of Supralingua as it is by the earthy, rhythmic sojourns that filled Diga Rhythm Band.... Digital technology has advanced considerably in the eight years that have passed since Hart issued Supralingua, and in what could be viewed as a reflection of the world’s computerized infrastructure, Global Drum Project's contents are genetic hybrids in which pure, manmade sounds are united with those that have been sampled and enhanced with effects. The vocals, in particular, are processed until they become psychedelic vapor trails that waft across the faces of the songs..."

In Glide magazine, Tim Newby wrote, "Their sound has moved away from the straight drum and percussion that dominated Planet Drum, and at times now takes on an ambient trance vibe. The album is colored by Hart's use of his computer workstation RAMU (Random Access Musical Universe) that allows him to access his entire library of sounds, enabling him to be able to loop and sample them into an entirely new musical collage. The distinct sounds created by Hart's RAMU provide the heartbeat and the personality for the album, about which he says, 'We had clear goals when Zakir and I started this, and we stayed with the vision. It's basically a combination of the archaic world — drums, membranes, percussion — and the digital domain. And we’re dancing between those two worlds.'"

On Jambands.com, Glenn Alexander said, "On Global Drum Project, [Mickey Hart] and fellow percussionist Zakir Hussain have assembled a group of musicians to make a modern drum record that steers clear of new age's more demure temperaments while harnessing modern technology to expose the music's breathing, pulsing heart. Skirting the boundaries of improvised abandon and honing in on movement, color, and melody, he and eight other world musicians manage to make a 'drum record' sound like so much more."

In All About Jazz, Glenn Astarita wrote, "Pristinely recorded, the artists use some of the latest and greatest studio processing techniques to augment the inherent instrumental elements. With oscillating chants and orations intermixed, the musicians merge tuned percussion and stringed-instruments into pulsating world-groove motifs. The sonic treatments are tastefully done and not over-baked, where they primarily use effects for texture and ornamentation. And within various movements Niladari Kumar's resonating sitar lines provide an echo-chamber type foreground to trickling, spiritualized vocals and mellow dreamscapes."

== Track listing ==
1. "Baba" – 5:25
2. "Kaluli Groove" – 7:20
3. "Funky Zena" – 4:25
4. "Under One Groove" – 5:58
5. "Dances with Wood" – 4:07
6. "Heartspace" – 5:27
7. "Tars" – 4:18
8. "I Can Tell You More" – 4:54

== Personnel ==
=== Musicians ===
- Mickey Hart – percussion, vocals
- Zakir Hussain – percussion, vocals
- Giovanni Hidalgo – Latin percussion
- Sikiru Adepoju – talking drum
- Babatunde Olatunji – vocals on "Baba"
- Taufiq Qureshi – percussion, vocals
- Niladari Kumar – sitar
- Dilshad Khan – sarangi

=== Production ===
- Producers: Mickey Hart, Zakir Hussain
- Digital production: Jonah Sharp, Graham Shrimpton
- Pro Tools engineers: Richard Fisher, John Paul McLean, Robert Gateley
- Mastering: John Cuniberti
- Mixing: Tom Flye, Mickey Hart, Zakir Hussain
- Recorded and mixed at Studio X, Sonoma County, California
- Liner notes: Mickey Hart, Zakir Hussain
