= RAMU (album) =

Studio album by Mickey Hart
- Released: November 10, 2017
- Genre: World music
- Length: 47:20
- Label: Verve Forecast
- Producer: Mickey Hart

Mickey Hart chronology
Superorganism (2013)	RAMU (2017)	In the Groove (2022)

RAMU is an album by drummer Mickey Hart. It combines traditional drums, electronic percussion, sampled sounds, and vocals. It was released on November 10, 2017.

The title of the album refers to the Random Access Musical Universe (RAMU). This is a synthesizer that combines a sophisticated drum machine with Hart's extensive library of sound samples. The RAMU is one of the many musical instruments heard on the album.

== Critical reception ==
In Relix, Justin Jacobs wrote, "... on his latest solo release, RAMU, Hart's created a deliciously meandering, melodic exploration, with a whole cast of more contemporary voices adding some ecstatically fun spice to the global drum experience. It’s like "Drums" and "Space" with an all-star backing band of internationals and aliens.... Thankfully, this 12-song collection is total, free-wheeling fun — all lunging rhythms, slithering jazz, bubbling beats, stacked vocals, and foggy atmospherics."

Pablo Gorondi of Associated Press said, "There's plenty of movement on Mickey Hart's 14th studio album, as the Grateful Dead drummer extends his prolific solo career centered on his amazing approaches to percussion, knowing expeditions into world music and the cross pollination between music and sciences.... the powers of RAMU stem from Hart's ability to calibrate layers upon layers of rhythms and melodies from bountiful sources — fine tuning instead of Auto-Tuning."

In a Rolling Stone interview of Hart, Andrew Leonard wrote, "Hart mixes the old – samples of blues recordings captured by Alan Lomax, snippets of never-before-heard Jerry Garcia guitar – with percussive, pulsating electronica. You'll want to put on your highest-end headphones to listen to it."

== Track listing ==
1. "Auctioneers" (Mickey Hart) – 2:41
2. "Wayward Son" (Hart, Robert Hunter) – 4:08
3. "Big Bad Wolf" (Hart, Tarriona "Tank" Ball) – 5:09
4. "The Lost Coast" (Hart) – 4:24
5. "Who Do You Think You Are?" (Hart, Hunter) – 3:54
6. "You Remind Me" (Hart, Hunter) – 4:08
7. "When the Morning Comes" (Hart, Ball) – 1:53
8. "Jerry" (Hart, Jerry Garcia) – 3:39
9. "Wine Wine Wine" (Hart) – 3:59
10. "Nacare" (Hart) – 4:58
11. "Spreading the News" (Hart, Hunter) – 3:38
12. "Time Beyond Reason" (Hart, Hunter, Garcia) – 4:42

== Personnel ==
Musicians

- Mickey Hart – traps, RAMU, beam, percussionscape
- Sikiru Adepoju – talking drum
- Tarriona "Tank" Ball – vocals
- Oteil Burbridge – bass guitar
- Peter Coyote – spoken word
- Jerry Garcia – guitar, synth guitar
- Samuel Goodman – strings
- Jason Hann – additional traps
- Giovanni Hidalgo – vocals, bata, congas
- Zakir Hussein – tabla, madal
- Sabir Khan – sarangi
- Steve Kimock – guitar, lap guitar
- Niladri Kumar – sitar, zitar
- Charles Lloyd – saxophone
- Babatunde Olatunji – vocals
- Avey Tare – vocals
- Sekaa Jegog Yuskumara – gamelan

Production

- Produced by Mickey Hart
- Co-producer: Michal Menert
- Associate producer: Reya Hart
- Recording engineers: Nic Pope, Tom Flye, Adam Tenenbaum, Boris Gladkihl, John-Paul McLean, Jason Mills
- Sound design: Mickey Hart, Michal Menert, Adam Tenenbaum, Boris Gladkihl
- Mixing: Mickey Hart, Nic Pope, Michal Menert, Zakir Hussein
- Additional recording, mixing, and production: Bassy Bob
- Arrangements: Mickey Hart, Michal Menert, Zakir Hussein
- Archival: "Decibel" Dave Dennison
- Mastering: Chris Gehringer
- Photos: Jay Blakesberg, Atiba Jefferson, Camille Lenain, Susana Millman, John Werner
- Cover illustration: Stanley Mouse
- Package design: Jacob Lerman
