= At the Edge =

Studio album by Mickey Hart
- Released: September 18, 1990
- Genre: World music
- Length: 48:04
- Label: Rykodisc
- Producer: Mickey Hart

Mickey Hart chronology
Music to Be Born By (1989)	At the Edge (1990)	Planet Drum (1991)

At the Edge is a percussion-based world music album by Grateful Dead drummer Mickey Hart. It was released on CD and cassette by Rykodisc Records on September 18, 1990. It was Hart's first album with the multi-national percussion ensemble that would later be called Planet Drum.

In an interview in 2008, Hart said of At the Edge, "The soft side of percussion. More, we were romancing the drum on that one and that was really very sparse, beautiful, serene, patient and calm."

== Book ==
On September 1, 1990, Harper San Francisco published the book Drumming at the Edge of Magic: A Journey into the Spirit of Percussion, by Mickey Hart, Jay Stevens, and Fredric Lieberman. The book explores the origins of drumming in human culture, and its relationship to spirituality. The book is a companion piece to the album At the Edge, and shares the same cover art by Nancy Nimoy. Hart later went on to release other album-and-book pairs – Planet Drum (1991) and Spirit into Sound (2000).

In an interview in 2011, Hart said, "Well, when I wrote that book I was looking for the origins of percussion. So by writing that book I kept going back, you know? To the Mongols of the 11th century. Then I went back to the caves, and then the Neolithic, then the Paleolithic, and then when I reached the point where drums first started to appear, I thought, well, okay, where did that come from? And, it led me back to the beginning of time and space. The beginning of the universe. The Big Bang."

== Critical reception ==
Professional ratings
Review scores
Source	Rating
Allmusic	2.5/5 stars
Q Magazine	3/5 stars

On Allmusic, William Ruhlmann wrote, "You'll feel like you're at the edge of the rain forest listening to this atmospheric recording that uses a variety of unusual instruments and employs such musicians as Jerry Garcia, Babatunde Olatunji, Airto Moreira, and Zakir Hussain." Ken Hart in Q Magazine called it "fragments of an unchartered musical wastelands."

== Track listing ==
1. "#4 for Gaia" (Mickey Hart) – 4:46
2. "Sky Water" (Hart, Zakir Hussain) – 8:15
3. "Slow Sailing" (Hart, Hussain) – 5:01
4. "Lonesome Hero" (Hart) – 6:19
5. "Fast Sailing" (Hart, Hussain) – 5:04
6. "Cougar Run" (Hart) – 3:39
7. "The Eliminators" (Creek Hart, Mickey Hart, Taro S. Hart, Jerry Garcia) – 6:01
8. "Brainstorm" (Hart, Babatunde Olatunji) – 4:12
9. "Pigs in Space" (Airto Moreira) – 4:39

== Personnel ==
=== Musicians ===
- Mickey Hart – drums, percussion
- Zakir Hussain – drums, percussion
- Sikiru Adepoju – drums, percussion
- Babatunde Olatunji – drums, percussion
- Airto Moreira – drums, percussion, vocals
- Jerry Garcia – electric guitar, guitar synthesizer, forest zone
- Joze Lorenzo – berimbau
- Creek Hart – drum samples
- Taro S. Hart – electronic drums

=== Production ===
- Mickey Hart – producer
- Tom Flye – engineering, mixing
- Jeff Sterling – engineering, mixing, computer processing
- Phil Kaffel – additional engineering
- Tom Size – additional engineering
- Joe Gastwirt – CD mastering
- Jack Crymes – technical support
- Jay Stevens – liner notes
- Nancy Nimoy – cover art
- Howard Jacobsen – art direction
- Steven Jurgensmeyer – package design
