= Mr. and Mrs. Iyer (soundtrack) =

Soundtrack album by Zakir Hussain
- Released: 18 January 2002
- Recorded: 2002
- Genre: Feature film soundtrack
- Length: 31:55
- Language: Hindi; English
- Label: Sony Music

Zakir Hussain chronology
Remember Shakti – Saturday Night in Bombay (2001)	Mr. and Mrs. Iyer (2002)	Selects (2002)

Mr. and Mrs. Iyer is the soundtrack album to the 2002 film of the same name directed by Aparna Sen, starring Konkona Sen Sharma and Rahul Bose. The film score and soundtrack were composed by Ustad Zakir Hussain, featuring contributions from him, along with Ustad Sultan Khan, Samantha and Pt. Uday Bhawalkar. The album was released through Sony Music on 18 January 2002.

== Development ==
Ustad Zakir Hussain composed music for Mr. and Mrs. Iyer. Bose introduced Hussain to Aparna and Konkana, when the musician was performing with Rahul Sharma for a concert at Kalamandir, Kolkata and influenced Hussain to compose the background score and songs to which he agreed. For the first time in mainstream cinema, Hussain had sung for a part of the song. Hussain stated that he actually did not agree to sing for the film, and claimed that his vocals were used as a dummy track for a popular singer to record. After the track was recorded, the producers decided to go for Hussain's voice as a part of one song. Ustad Sultan Khan performed vocals and played sarangi for most of the tracks and English singer Samantha had recorded two tracks as well. The theme music of the film was performed by classical vocalist Uday Bhawalkar.

Hussain considered the involvement to the film, as the story beings reminiscent of his childhood, making it more relatable. He recalled of how his father Alla Rakha would travel for concerts, while his mother would look after him and would miss his father; he actually pictured that scenario when Aparna narrated the script to him, which felt like reel became real, and ended up doing the project. He admitted that the main character was a musician and share something reminisicent of Hussain's childhood scenario with her family.

== Reception ==
Subhash K. Jha of Rediff.com wrote Hussain's songs and score punctuates moods with passion, adding "in knitting irreconcilable moods and atmospheric pressures, Hussain proves himself a fine craftsman." S Sahaya Ranjit of India Today wrote "Zakir rarely composes music for films, so if you are a fan then this album is a must-buy." Derek Elley of Variety wrote "[an] atmospheric scoring by Ustad Zakir Hussain can't conceal the awkward, issue-driven dialogue and wavering direction, showing influences from both the arty and commercial". Madhureeta Mukherjee of The Times of India wrote "Zakir Hussain's drumming notes add more rhythm to the soul of the film."

== Track listing ==
No.	Title	Singer(s)	Length
1.	"Kithe Meher Ali" (Remix)	Ustad Zakir Hussain and Ustad Sultan Khan	05:19
2.	"Don't Look Away"	Samantha featuring Ustad Sultan Khan (on Alap)	03:55
3.	"Don't Look Away" (Remix)	Samantha featuring Ustad Sultan Khan (on Alap)	05:28
4.	"Kithe Meher Ali"	Ustad Zakir Hussain and Ustad Sultan Khan	05:08
5.	"If I'd Known..."	Ustad Zakir Hussain and Samantha	05:47
6.	"Theme Music of Mr. and Mrs. Iyer"	Ustad Zakir Hussain and Pandit Uday Bhawalkar	06:16
