= Jay Stevens =

American writer (1953–2025)

Jay Karl Stevens (November 11, 1953 – February 19, 2025) was a freelance writer and social historian. Stevens was born and raised into a family of farmers in Springfield, Vermont. He attended school there as a child and then Kimball Union Academy in New Hampshire, going on to the University of Vermont after graduation.

He is the author of Storming Heaven: LSD and the American Dream (1987), which has been described as a "classic" by historian David Farber and "the quintessential work on the history of LSD in America" by Kristin Robinson. Historian of science and medicine Benjamin Breen also recommends the book for those wishing to learn more about the history of LSD.

Stevens is also the co-author of Drumming at the Edge of Magic with Grateful Dead percussionist Mickey Hart and ethnomusicologist Fredric Lieberman. He founded Applied Orphics, a digital marketing and distribution company, and Rap Lab, a program bringing at-risk teenagers and professional musicians and poets together. Prior to his death, he was living at his family farm in Weathersfield Bow, Vermont, where he produced maple syrup.

== Selected works ==
Books

- Storming Heaven: LSD and the American Dream (1987) ISBN 9780871130761
- Drumming at the Edge of Magic (with Mickey Hart & Fredric Lieberman) (1990) ISBN 9780062503725
- Planet Drum: A Celebration of Percussion and Rhythm (with Mickey Hart & Fredric Lieberman) (1991) ISBN 9780062504142
- The Sixties edited by Peter Stine, Jay Stevens contributor. Wayne State University Press (January 1, 1996) ISBN 0814325580, ISBN 978-0814325582

Discography

- Dance House by Jay Stevens and Derek Young (2012)
- Orphic Revival by Jay Karl Stevens and The Raven (2013)

Articles

- "Keeper of the Vermont Character" Yankee Magazine (March, 1992).
