= Spirit into Sound =

Studio album by Mickey Hart
- Released: January 25, 2000
- Genre: World music
- Length: 47:10
- Label: Grateful Dead Records
- Producer: Mickey Hart

Mickey Hart chronology
Supralingua (1998)	Spirit into Sound (2000)	The Best of Mickey Hart: Over the Edge and Back (2002)

Spirit into Sound is a percussion-based world music album by former Grateful Dead drummer Mickey Hart. It was released on CD on January 25, 2000. Most of the compositions were co-written by Hart and Rebeca Mauleón, both of whom play a wide variety of drums and percussion instruments on the album. Mauleón also sings on many of the tracks. Zakir Hussain plays various drums and contributes to most of the tracks. Additional musicians include Ustad Sultan Khan on sarangi and Bob Weir on acoustic guitar.

== Book ==
The book Spirit into Sound: The Magic of Music was co-written by Mickey Hart and ethnomusicologist Fredric Lieberman. Published in November 1999, the book is a companion piece to the album, and features the same cover art. The book explores the connection between music, spirituality, and healing in various cultures, and collects quotes from many famous people.

In an interview in 2000, Hart said, "I was compiling the book, and [the compositions on the album] are the musical images, which is spiritual really that came to mind while I was working on the book. Any book about music that doesn't have an aural component to it is a mute book. So this book and this CD are loose companions. They are sort of sisters."

== Critical reception ==
Professional ratings
Review scores
Source	Rating
Allmusic	3/5 stars
The Music Box	4/5 stars

In The Music Box, John Metzger wrote, "Hart's latest release Spirit into Sound continues down the pathway of spiritual transcendence through the almighty groove. Further, his understanding of melody and song has evolved to the point where each track on the album plays out like a meditational hymn. Credit for this is no doubt due to vocalist Rebeca Mauleón who co-wrote eleven of the twelve tracks, but this is a road down which Hart has been traveling for some time.... Unlike Supralingua, Spirit into Sound is a much more subtle affair. Its beguiling grooves gently flow, soothing the soul and carrying the listener towards a state of higher consciousness. There is a circularity to the rhythms that is designed to induce a trance-like state of peaceful meditation."

On Allmusic, Stacia Proefrock said, "Though Spirit into Sound does not break much new ground creatively for Mickey Hart, it does feature some nice elements. Hart's new age sort of blend of melodic elements and percussion are here again, centering around a very spiritual sound with heavy South American and African tribal influences."

In the Chicago Tribune, Daniel Durchholz wrote, "The album, composed by Hart and Planet Drum member Rebeca Mauleón, is a low-key polyglot of world-music styles, emphasizing rhythm, but paying plenty of attention to melody as well."

== Track listing ==
All tracks composed by Mickey Hart and Rebeca Mauleón, except "Indian Night" composed by Hart, Zakir Hussain and Ustad Sultan Khan.

1. "Amazon Nguni" – 3:34
2. "Sueño Tropicale" – 4:41
3. "Cloud Moss" – 3:57
4. "Funky Peru" – 4:34
5. "Shambolaya" – 4:39
6. "Lizard Dance" – 3:55
7. "Nature Talk" – 3:53
8. "Elephant Walk" – 5:10
9. "Chroma" – 3:43
10. "Hidden Beach" – 4:53
11. "Native Sun" – 3:34
12. "Indian Night" – 2:54

== Personnel ==
=== Musicians ===
- Mickey Hart – drums, percussion
- Rebeca Mauleón – vocals, drums, percussion, flutes, bass, prepared piano
- Zakir Hussain – drums
- Rahsaan Fredricks – bass on "Amazon Nguni", "Funky Peru", "Chroma"
- Bob Weir – acoustic guitar on "Sueño Tropicale"
- Ustad Sultan Khan – sarangi on "Indian Night"
- Bobi Céspedes – vocals on "Cloud Moss", "Chroma"
- Haroon Tahir – forest zone on "Nature Talk"

=== Production ===
- Mickey Hart – producer
- Tom Fly – recording, mixing, mastering
- Jeffrey Norman – mixdown engineer, mastering
- Kevin Sellers – Pro Tools operator
- Haroon Tahir – computer programming
- Roy Finch – computer programming
- Matt Jepsen – computer programming
- Jack Crymes – technical support
- Howard Cohen – production management, package design
- Margie Nelte – package design
- Chris Pinkerton – cover illustration
- Michael Quinn – cover design
