= Mickey Hart's Mystery Box =

Studio album by Mickey Hart
- Released: June 11, 1996
- Genre: World music
- Length: 54:17
- Label: Rykodisc
- Producer: Mickey Hart

Mickey Hart chronology
Planet Drum (1991)	Mickey Hart's Mystery Box (1996)	Supralingua (1998)

Mickey Hart's Mystery Box is an album by former Grateful Dead drummer Mickey Hart. It was released on CD and cassette by Rykodisc Records on June 11, 1996. The album combines Hart's percussion-based world music with the vocal harmonies of the British singing sextet the Mint Juleps. Robert Hunter wrote the lyrics for all the songs.

The song "Only the Strange Remain" was later performed live by the Other Ones, and appears on their album The Strange Remain.

== Critical reception ==
Professional ratings
Review scores
Source	Rating
Allmusic	4.5/5 stars
The Music Box	4/5 stars

On Allmusic, Lindsay Planer said, "Mickey Hart's Mystery Box harks back to [Rolling Thunder] with [Hart's] first album of pop-oriented material in nearly a quarter-century. He combines the seemingly disparate world of percussion-based rhythms with traditional 'Western-style' structures containing lyrics by Grateful Dead wordsmith Robert Hunter. All the more diverse are the contributions of the Mint Juleps.... Their paradisaical harmonies support Hart's occasional leads, while they're effectively incorporated as primary participants on the infectious groove..."

In The Music Box, John Metzger wrote, "Overlaying the rhythmic sounds created by Hart, Giovanni Hidalgo, Zakir Hussain, Sikiru Adepoju, Babatunde Olatunji, and Airto Moreira are the sweet, soulful vocals of the Mint Juleps. What ensues is an album with more of a rhythm and blues feel than many Hart fans may be accustomed, but... persistence will pay off with tremendous rewards. Robert Hunter penned the lyrics to all of the songs on Mickey Hart's Mystery Box, and as with all of his poetic creations, the lyrics contain multiple meanings that will shift depending upon one's mood.... The Mint Juleps handle the Hunter-penned lyrics so skillfully that the ensemble essentially becomes a rhythm track of its own.... In short, Mickey Hart's Mystery Box is a multi-dimensional album that contains many subtle rhythm and vocal textures."

Roger Catlin of the Hartford Courant called the album "a surprising and enjoyable new direction that marries [Hart's] complex sense of rhythm with the naturally appealing sound of contemporary soul.... Just about the furthest thing from tie-dyed guitar-rock nostalgia as could be imagined, Mystery Box pulses with life and zings with harmonious energy."

== Track listing ==
1. "Where Love Goes (Sito)" (Robert Hunter, Mickey Hart, Mint Juleps, Babatunde Olatunji, Zakir Hussain, Giovanni Hidalgo) – 5:25
2. "Full Steam Ahead" (Hunter, Hart, Dave Jenkins, Vince Welnick, Mint Juleps, Hussain, Hidalgo, Sikiru Adepoju) – 5:18
3. "Down the Road" (Hunter, Hart, Jenkins, Welnick, Hidalgo) – 5:59
4. "The Sandman" (Hunter, Hart, Jenkins, Welnick, Mint Juleps, Hussain) – 4:09
5. "The Next Step" (Hunter, Hart, Jenkins, Welnick, Jeff Sterling, Hussain, Hidalgo, Adepoju) – 5:23
6. "Look Away" (Hunter, Hart, Mint Juleps, Adepoju, Hidalgo) – 5:58
7. "Only the Strange Remain" (Hunter, Hart) – 6:24
8. "Sangre de Cristo" (Hunter, Hart, Jenkins, Welnick, Hussain, Hidalgo) – 4:14
9. "John Cage is Dead" (Hunter, Hart, Jenkins, Welnick, Hidalgo, Hussain) – 6:02
10. "The Last Song" (Hunter, Hart, Mint Juleps, Adepoju, Hidalgo) – 5:15

== Personnel ==
=== Musicians ===
- Mickey Hart – drums, percussion, vocals
- Giovanni Hidalgo – drums, percussion
- Jeff Sterling – keyboards, drums, percussion
- Zakir Hussain – drums, percussion
- Habib Faye – bass guitar
- Sikiru Adepoju – talking drum

The Mint Juleps

- Debbie Charles – vocals
- Elizabeth Charles – vocals
- Julie Isaac – vocals
- Debbie Longworth – vocals
- Marcia Charles – vocals
- Sandra Charles – vocals

Additional musicians

- Bob Weir – guitar on "The Sandman"
- Bruce Hornsby – accordion, background vocals on "Down the Road"
- Airto Moreira – percussion on "Full Steam Ahead", "The Sandman", "Look Away", "The Last Song"
- Robin Millar – marimba on "The Sandman", sine bass on "Only the Strange Remain", "Sangre de Cristo", keyboards on "John Cage is Dead"
- Mark Smith – bass guitar on "The Sandman", "Look Away", "Sangre de Cristo", "The Last Song"
- Graham Wiggins – didgeridoo on "Only the Strange Remain"
- Gyuto Monks Tantric Choir – vocals on "Only the Strange Remain"
- Taro Hart – drums on "Look Away"

=== Production ===
- Mickey Hart – production, mixing
- Robin Millar – co-production, mixing
- Tom Flye – recording, mix engineer
- Jeff Sterling – second engineer, programming
- Bob Levy – additional engineering
- Jen Monnar – additional engineering
- Wayne Pooley – additional engineering
- Mark Smith – programming
- Andrew Scheps – programming
- Jack Crymes – technical support
- Howard Cohen – production management and coordination
- Barry Melton – production consultant
- Karen B. Ollis – photography
- John Werner – photography
- Jay Blakesberg – photography
- Verna Gillis – photography
- Steven Jurgensmeyer – design
- Cameron Sears – artist management
