= Supralingua =

Studio album by Mickey Hart and Planet Drum
- Released: August 4, 1998
- Genre: World music
- Length: 54:34; Bonus disc 27:08
- Label: Rykodisc
- Producer: Mickey Hart

Mickey Hart chronology
| Mickey Hart's Mystery Box (1996) | Supralingua (1998) | Spirit into Sound (1999) |

Supralingua is an album by former Grateful Dead drummer Mickey Hart and his percussion ensemble Planet Drum. It was released on CD by Rykodisc Records on August 4, 1998.

Like the band's previous album, Planet Drum, Supralingua showcases drum music from multiple cultures, combined to produce a percussion-based world music sound. It also incorporates samples and computer generated sounds, some of them created using a computer workstation called RAMU (Random Access Musical Universe). The name of the album means "beyond language" or "beyond words".

Supralingua reached number 4 on the Billboard chart for Top World Music Albums.

== Critical reception ==
Professional ratings
Review scores
| Source | Rating |
|---|---|
| Allmusic | 3/5 stars |
| The Music Box | 4/5 stars |

On Allmusic, Stephen Thomas Erlewine wrote, "Basically, Supralingua is a continuation of the direction [Hart] began with Planet Drum, boasting a similar selection of polyrhythmic, multicultural pieces. There aren't really any songs on the record – just extended grooves, where even the vocals fit into the gigantic, everlasting drum beats. To some, this can be quite monotonous, to others utterly mesmerizing – there's no middle ground, really, and it all depends on whether the strength of the grooves and their inherent mysticism outweigh the formless compositions.".

In The Music Box, John Metzger said, "Hart draws not only upon his past aural paintings with Planet Drum, but also upon his collaborations with the Gyuto monks, which adds a supernatural aura to "Angola". He also applies his experiences with the Mystery Box album and tour in creating much tighter song arrangements while allowing a natural groove to form and flow.... Supralingua is a serious, mind-bending, psychedelic journey. It's a surreal, spiritual experience that is full of rich textures and dense grooves. Anyone even remotely curious about the power of drumming will find not only that the album's forceful energy is immediately overwhelming but also that it will lead to enlightenment.".

== Track listing ==
=== Supralingua ===
1. "Angola" (Sikiru Adepoju, David Garibaldi, Mickey Hart, Giovanni Hidalgo, Zakir Hussain, Bakithi Kumalo) – 4:54
2. "Yabu" (Garibaldi, Hart, Hidalgo, Hussain, Kumalo, Babatunde Olatunji) – 4:44
3. "Endless River" (Adepoju, Garibaldi, Hart, Hidalgo, Hussain, Kumalo, Rebeca Mauleón) – 2:50
4. "Umayeyo" (Adepoju, Garibaldi, Hart, Hidalgo, Hussain, Kumalo) – 6:03
5. "Secret Meeting Place" (Adepoju, Garibaldi, Hart, Hidalgo, Hussain, Kumalo) – 3:13
6. "Tall Grass" (Adepoju, Garibaldi, Hart, Hidalgo, Hussain, Kumalo) – 5:39
7. "Umasha" (Garibaldi, Hart, Hidalgo, Hussain, Kumalo) – 5:22
8. "Frog Dance" (Adepoju, Garibaldi, Hart, Hidalgo, Hussain) – 4:46
9. "Damawoo" (Adepoju, Garibaldi, Hart, Hussain) – 3:05
10. "Indoscrub" (Garibaldi, Hart, Hidalgo, Hussain, Kumalo) – 4:45
11. "Wheel of Time" (Hart, Hussain) – 6:16
12. "Space Dust" (Adepoju, Garibaldi, Hart, Hidalgo, Hussain, Kumalo) – 2:53

=== Bonus disc ===
1. "Umasha" (Strawberry Swamp Fever Mix) – 6:24
2. "Yabu" (Transmigration Mix #2) – 5:49
3. "Umayeyo" (Slakked Plastik Remix) – 8:27
4. "Wheel of Time" (Stolen Moments Real Time Dub Crime Remix) – 6:22
1. "Video Interview with Mickey Hart" (Jeff Salt, Interviewer)

== Personnel ==
=== Musicians ===
Planet Drum:

- Mickey Hart – drums, percussion, RAMU, vocals
- Sikiru Adepoju – drums, percussion, vocals
- David Garibaldi – drum kit, percussion
- Giovanni Hidalgo – drums, percussion, vocals
- Zakir Hussain – drums, percussion, vocals
- Bakithi Kumalo – electric bass, drums, percussion, vocals

Additional musicians:

- Jorgé Bermudez – drums, percussion
- Joey Blake – vocals
- Bobi Céspedes – vocals
- Jesus Diaz – vocals
- Chalo Eduardo – drums, percussion
- Reya Hart – vocal sample
- Raz Kennedy – vocals
- Alan Kushan – vocals
- Rebeca Mauleón – vocals
- Airto Moreira – drums, percussion
- Babatunde Olatunji – vocal sample
- Mimi Spencer – drums, percussion
- Graham Wiggins – didgeridoo sample
- Gyüto Monks Tantric Choir – vocal sample

=== Production ===
- Mickey Hart – producer, liner notes
- Candice Pacheco – associate producer, sound designer
- Tom Flye – engineer, recording
- Zac Allentuck – assistant engineer
- Zakir Hussain – pre-production
- Kevin Sellers – Pro Tools editor
- Mark Jeffrey – additional editing
- Joe Gastwirt – mastering
- Fredric Lieberman – liner notes
- John Werner – photography
- Stevee Postman – illustration, design
- Steven Jurgensmeyer – illustration, design
