= Sikiru Adepoju =

Nigerian percussionist

Background information
- Born: 15 May 1956 (age 69)
- Origin: Nigeria
- Genres: World music
- Occupations: Percussionist, recording artist
- Instrument: Talking drum
- Website: sikiru.com

Sikiru Adepoju (born 10 November 1950) is a Nigerian percussionist and recording artist, primarily in the genres of traditional African music and world music. He plays a variety of instruments and styles.

== Background ==
A master of the talking drum, Adepoju comes from a musical family from Eruwa in western Nigeria. He and his brothers Saminu and Lasisi were taught drumming very early by their father, Chief Ayanleke Adepoju, whose very name, Ayan, means "descended from drummers." While still in his teens, Sikiru toured with and recorded several albums with the Inter-Reformers Band, the band of one of the pioneers of Afro-beat, Nigerian Juju artist Chief Commander Ebenezer Obey.

== Musical career ==
In 1985, Adepoju came to America to play with O. J. Ekemode's Nigerian All-Stars, and three months later met Babatunde Olatunji.

He became an integral part of Olatunji's Drums of Passion, and through Olatunji met Grateful Dead drummer Mickey Hart. Since then he has frequently been a guest percussionist during Hart and Bill Kreutzmann's "Rhythm Devils" segments of Grateful Dead concerts, and played talking drum with Mickey Hart's group Bembe Orisha, which toured in 2001. He has been a part of most of Mickey Hart's projects since they first met, including the albums (and associated tours) Mickey Hart's Mystery Box, At the Edge, and Supralingua, and was a Grammy Award contributor to Mickey Hart's Planet Drum and Global Drum Project albums. Sikiru is a member of the Mickey Hart Band, has recorded on their CD Mysterium Tremendum, and is featured on vocals on the song "Who Stole the Show?".

He has collaborated with Muruga Booker and Olatunji on the CD Cosmic Rhythm Vibrations (recently remastered and re-issued by Chesky Records as Circle of Drums). He plays with Muruga Booker and Badal Roy as part of the Global Village Ceremonial Band, and appeared with them at the Starwood Festival in 2003, which led to the creation of the SpiritDrum Festival (a tribute to [Babatunde Olatunji, which also featured Jim Donovan of Rusted Root, Perry Robinson, Richie "Shakin'" Nagan, Jeff Rosenbaum and Halim El-Dabh). He has recorded albums with artists as varied as Carlos Santana, Airto Moreira, Bola Abimbola, The String Cheese Incident, Stevie Wonder, Zakir Hussain, Chief Ebenezer Obey, the Inter-Reformers Band, and the Nigerian All-Stars.

Adepoju also leads groups of his own, including The Honeymakers, Afrika Heartbeat, and Sikiru Adepoju & Heart Beat. Afrika Heartbeat debut their first CD, entitled Ijinle Ilu, in 2003. The band Sikiru Adepoju & Heart Beat debut on 22 July 2009 at the 29th Starwood Festival, featuring Douglas "Val" Serrant (steel drum and djembe), guitarist Peter Fujii, percussionist Deen Badarou, trap drummer Deszon X. Claiborne, and DJ Deegan Mack Adams. At the same event he and Serrant joined a re-launch of the Rainforest Band as a tribute to Merl Saunders, the site of their last performance, featuring his son Tony Saunders, Michael Hinton, and other members of the Rainforest Band and other Saunders' projects.

Adepoju's current project is entitled "Riddim Doctors". It features Sikiru Adepoju, Giovanni Hidalgo, Zakir Hussain, Ian "Inx" Herman, Femi Ojetunde, Peter Fujii, Sola Babatola. and Douglas "Val" Serrant.

== Discography ==
- The Apocalypse Now Sessions (1979) – Rhythm Devils
- Juju Jubilee (1985) – Ebenezer Obey
- Drums of Passion: The Invocation (1988) – Babatunde Olatunji
- Drums of Passion: The Beat (1989) – Babatunde Olatunji
- At the Edge (1990) – Mickey Hart
- Planet Drum (1991) – Mickey Hart
- Jungle Fever (1991) – Stevie Wonder
- Drums of Passion: Celebrate Freedom, Justice & Peace (1993) – Babatunde Olatunji
- Big Bang (1995) – various artists
- Mickey Hart's Mystery Box (1996) – Mickey Hart
- Watchfire (1996) – Pete Sears & Friends
- Best of Ellipsis Arts (1997) – various artists
- Supralingua (1998) – Mickey Hart
- The Rose that Grew from Concrete – (2000)
- Honour Simplicity, Respect the Flow (2000) – Kai Eckhardt
- The Best of Mickey Hart: Over the Edge and Back (2002) – Mickey Hart
- Ijinle Ilu – Afrika Heartbeat (2003)
- Life After That (2003) – Airto Moreira
- Soup's on Fire (2003) – Jana Herzen
- 21 July 2004 San Francisco Ca: On The Road (2004) – The String Cheese Incident
- Circle of Drums (2005) – Babatunde Olatunji
- Ara Kenge (2005) – Bola Abimbola
- Global Drum Project (2008) – Mickey Hart, Zakir Hussain, Sikiru Adepoju, Giovanni Hidalgo
- The Rhythm Devils Concert Experience (2009) – Rhythm Devils
- Mysterium Tremendum (2012) – Mickey Hart Band
- Superorganism (2013) – Mickey Hart Band
- RAMU (2017) – Mickey Hart
- In the Groove (2022) – Planet Drum

== Filmography ==
- The Rhythm Devils Concert Experience (2008 two-disc DVD)

== Awards ==
Sikiru Adepoju won the Grammy Award for Best Contemporary World Music Album in 2009 for his contribution to the title album of Mickey Hart's Global Drum Project at the 51st annual Grammy Awards in Los Angeles.
