= Bola Abimbola =

Nigerian artist and vocalist (born c. 1968)

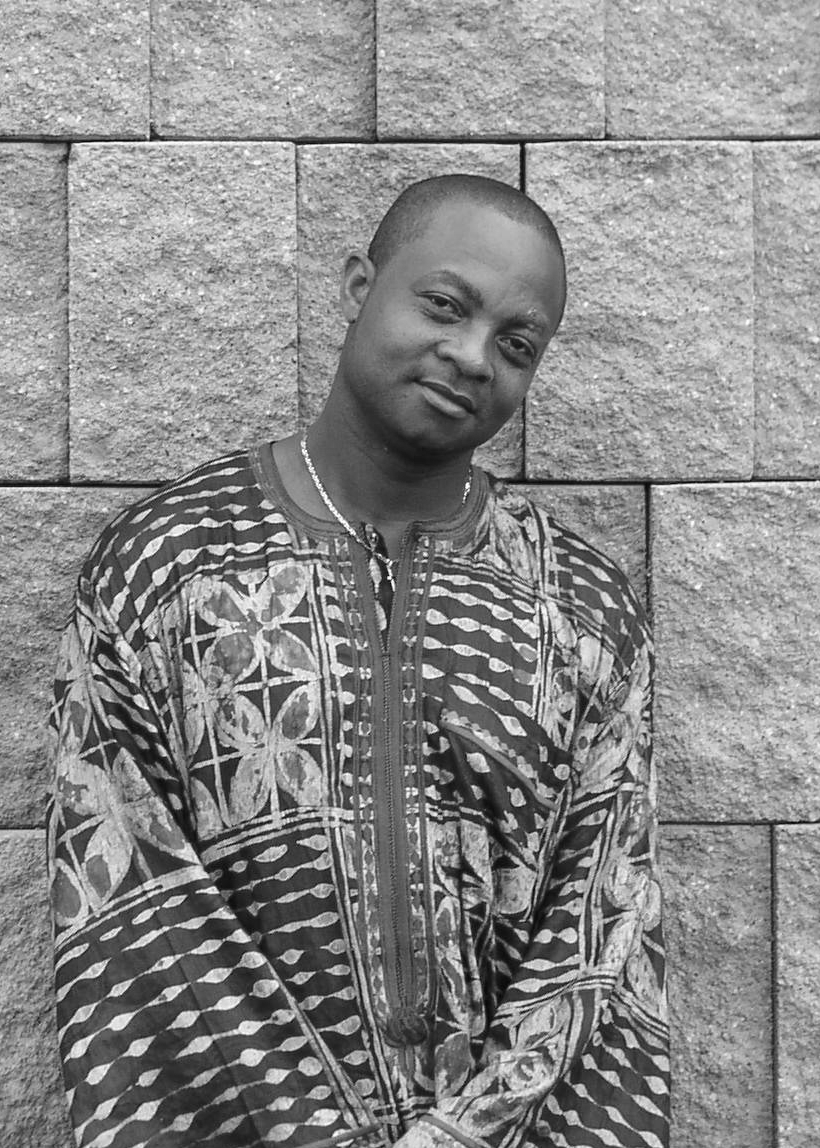

Background information
- Born: 1968 (age 56–57)
- Origin: Lagos, Nigeria
- Occupations: Vocalist; recording artist; record producer

Bola Abimbola (born c. 1968) is a Nigerian vocalist, recording artist, and record producer from Lagos, Nigeria.

== Musical career ==
Abimbola's career in music began at the age of nineteen with his first recording, Silifa Bamijo, which featured a Yoruba-language version of Michael Jackson's "Don't Stop Till You Get Enough".

Abimbola has toured and recorded as a solo artist, as well as with King Sunny Adé, Sikiru Adepoju, and Giovanni Hidalgo.

== Discography ==
- Silifa Bamijo (1987) - Bola Abimbola
- Computer (1992) - Wasiu Alabi Pasuma
- Orobokibo (1993) - Wasiu Alabi Pasuma
- Merit (1993) - Shina Akanni
- Master Blaster (1993) - Sayeed Osupa
- The Man (1994) - Wasiu Alabi Pasuma
- Fuji Scorpio (1995) - Shina Akanni
- Stainless (1995) - Sayeed Osupa
- The Way Forward (1996) - King Sunny Adé
- Lift Me Up (1997) - Kingsley Ogunde
- Tukasa (1997) - Alhaji Ayinla Kolington
- Buyanga (1998) - Bola Abimbola
- Seven Degrees North (2000) - King Sunny Adé
- Trick Deck (2000) - Trick Deck
- Crisis (2001) - Bola Abimbola
- Ijinle Ilu (2005) - Sikiru Adepoju
- Ara Kenge (2006) - Bola Abimbola

== Filmography ==
- Bore Po (1997)

== Awards ==
He received two Nigerian "Fame" awards in 1998 - "Best Video" and "Artist of the Year".
