= Rebeca Mauleon =

American pianist, composer, and educator (born 1962)

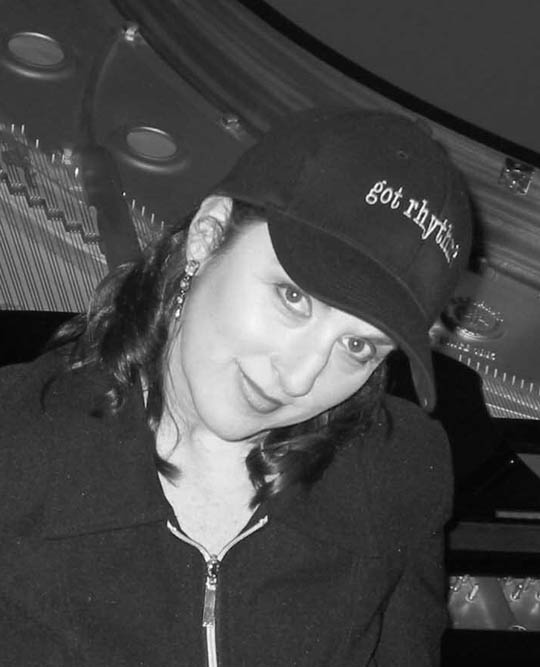

Background information
- Born: April 16, 1962 (age 64); Santa Monica, California
- Genres: Latin, Afro-Caribbean
- Occupations: Musician, composer, writer
- Instruments: Piano, drums, percussion, voice
- Years active: 1981–present
- Website: rebecamauleon.com

Rebeca Mauleón (born April 16, 1962) is an American pianist, composer, arranger and writer, specializing in salsa and other Latin American and Afro-Caribbean music.

== Career ==
Mauleón was born in Santa Monica, California in 1962. She began her professional career in her teen years as a performer and recording artist, and worked with many musicians in a variety of musical genres. She has written several texts and articles about the history of Latin and Caribbean music, including Salsa Guidebook.

Since her early twenties, she has performed and recorded with celebrities in the Latin and jazz music scenes, including Tito Puente, Carlos Santana, Cachao, the conguero Carlos "Patato" Valdes, Armando Peraza, Giovanni Hidalgo, Joe Henderson, Sheila E, Steve Winwood, Michael Nesmith and others, and as one of very few female band-leaders in Afro-Caribbean jazz.

As a producer, Mauleón has been involved in a wide array of music-related projects, from film and television documentaries to music software companies and instructional DVDs.

Her solo recordings – Round Trip, Latin Fire and Descarga en California – have attained top-ten status on Latin music industry charts. She has appeared at numerous national and international music festivals, including the Women in Jazz Festival at the Kennedy Center in Washington DC, the Monterey Jazz and San Francisco Jazz Festivals.

As musical director of Mickey Hart's Planet Drum ensemble, Mauleón has performed throughout the U.S., appearing at Woodstock in 1999 as well as on the Conan O'Brien and Regis and Kathy Lee shows. In 2001 she was the recipient of the Meet the Composer New Residencies Award, and has also been a Sundance Composers fellow.

She is a professor of Latin American, Caribbean and jazz music as well as composition, and has taught at several universities around the world. Also, she has served as a musicological consultant to National Geographic. Mauleón was appointed Director of Education at SFJAZZ in 2011.

Rebeca's powerful style at the piano and her high-energy musical direction have been dubbed "visceral" (Billboard Magazine), "fiery" (Utne Reader), and critics have lauded her as "one of the hippest band-leaders in Latin music today" (Allmusic).

== Discography ==
Rebeca Mauleón in action

=== As guest ===
- Pete Escovedo, Mister E (Crossover, 1988)
- Mickey Hart, Supralingua (Rycodisc, 1998)
- Mickey Hart, Spirit into Sound (Grateful Dead, 1999)
- Machete Ensemble, Africa Vol. I (Machete, 1986)
- Machete Ensemble, Machete (Xenophile, 1995)
- Maraca, Formula Uno (Artex, 1993)
- Rebeca Mauleón, Latin Fire (Rumbeca Music, 2004)
- Rebeca Mauleón, Descarga en California (Universal, 2006)
- Ray Obiedo, Perfect Crime (Windham Hill, 1989)
- Ray Obiedo, Iguana (Windham Hill, 1990)
- Orquesta Batachanga, La Nueva Tradición (Sugarloaf, 1981)
- Orquesta Batachanga, Mañana Para los Niños (Xenophile, 1983)
- Tito Puente, Un Poco Loco (Concord Picante, 1987)
- Tito Puente, Salsa Meets Jazz (Concord Picante, 1988)
- Tito Puente, Goza Mi Timbal (Concord Picante, 1990)
- Tito Puente, Royal T (Concord Picante, 1993)
- José Luis Quintana, The History of Songo (DCI/Warner, 1996)
- Carlos Santana, All That I Am (Arista, 2005)
- Carlos Santana, Milagro (Polydor, 1992)
- Carlos "Patato" Valdez, Ritmo y Candela (Redwood, 1995)
- Steve Winwood, Junction Seven (Virgin, 1997)

== Publications ==
- "Cachao: Eighty Years in the Mambo Kingdom," Bass Player, March 2008
- "Andy García puts Cuban music in the Spotlight," JazzTimes, July/August 2006.
- Muy Caliente, Sher Music Co., 2000.
- "The Roots of Latin Music," GRAMMY Gateway, December 1999.
- 101 Montunos, Sher Music Co., 1999.
- "Cachao: legado de la música afrocubana," Mix En Español, June 1998.
- The Latin Pianist, Computer Software Program, PG Music, 1997.
- The Latin Real Book, Sher Music Co., 1997. (Co-Editor)
- "The Heart of Salsa: Exploring Afro-Caribbean Piano Styles," Keyboard Magazine, January 1996.
- "Changuito's Groove," Modern Drummer, November 1995.
- "The Bass Players of Cuba" (Parts I & II), Bass Player, Nov. & Dec. 1995.
- "The Drummers of Cuba," Modern Drummer, June 1994.
- Salsa Guidebook, Sher Music Co., 1993.
- The Piano Stylist, Vol. 7, No. 6, excerpts from Salsa Guidebook, 1992.
