= The Rhythm Devils Concert Experience =

- DVD cover
- Directed by: Jeff Glixman; Jim Gentile; Mickey Hart
- Starring: Rhythm Devils
- Distributed by: Star City Recording
- Release date: May 20, 2008
- Country: United States
- Language: English

The Rhythm Devils Concert Experience is a 2008 two-disc DVD concert film and documentary of the Rhythm Devils 2006 tour, featuring members of the Grateful Dead, Phish, The Other Ones, and Deep Banana Blackout. The name "Rhythm Devils" was originally a nickname for Dead drummers Mickey Hart and Bill Kreutzmann. Hart and Kreutzmann formed the band in 2006 and used the name as the group's moniker.

Disc one features concert footage from Chicago, Illinois, and Sayreville, New Jersey recorded in October 2006, featuring all original compositions with lyrics by Grateful Dead lyricist Robert Hunter. Disc two features behind the scenes interviews, sound check footage, and excerpts from various live concerts.

== Track listing ==
- "Comes the Dawn"
- "Fountains of Wood"
- "The Center"
- "7 Seconds"
- "Your House"
- "Arabian Wind"
- "See You Again"
- "Next Dimension"

== Personnel ==
- Mickey Hart – drums, percussion
- Bill Kreutzmann – drums, percussion
- Mike Gordon – bass, vocals
- Steve Kimock – guitar
- Jen Durkin – vocals
- Sikiru Adepoju – percussion
