= Zakir Hussain (musician) =

Indian tabla player and composer (1951–2024)

Ustad Zakir Hussain ज़ाकिर हुसैन
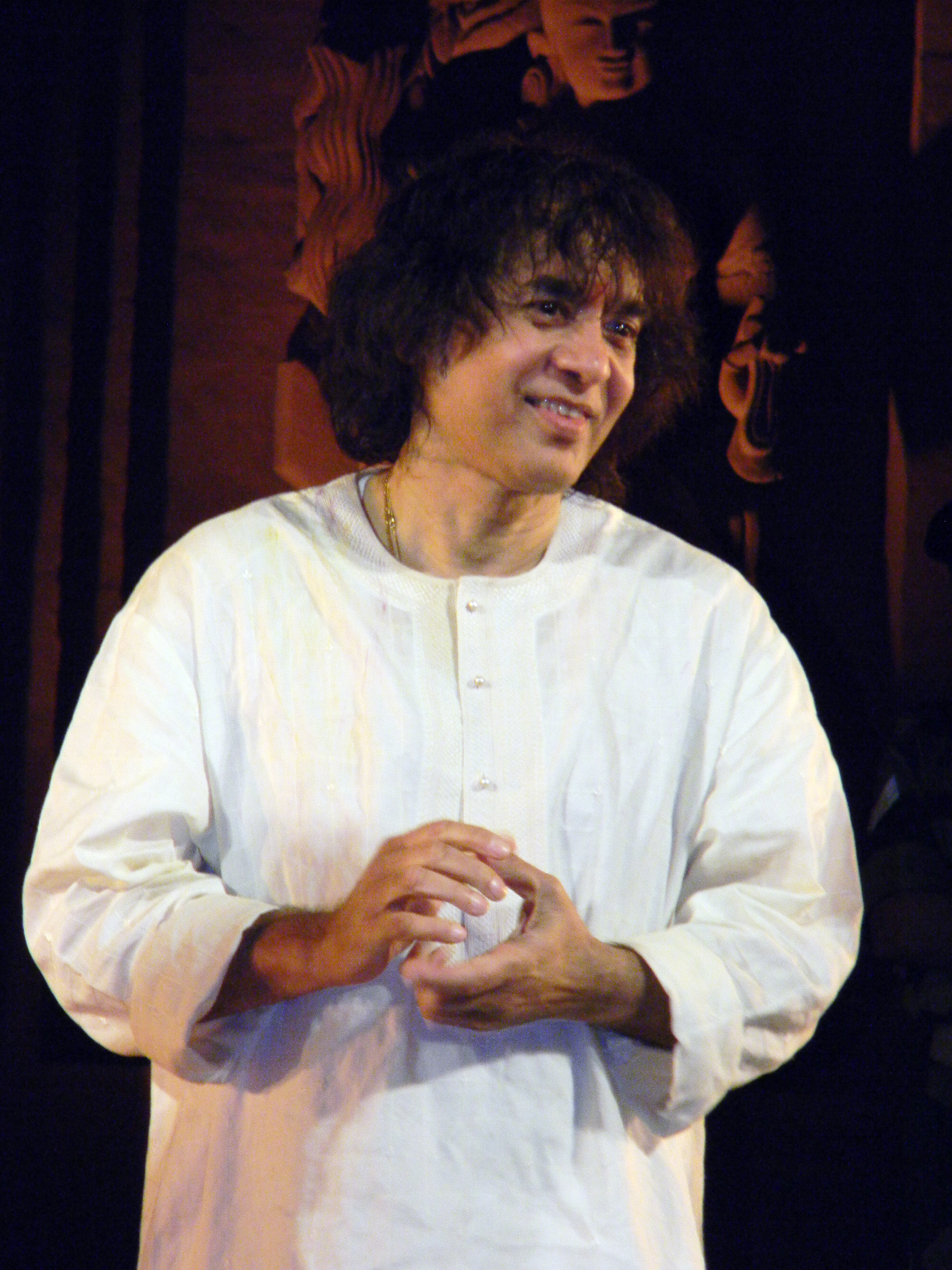
- Hussain in 2012

Background information
- Born: Zakir Hussain Qureshi; 9 March 1951; Bombay, Bombay State, India
- Died: 15 December 2024 (aged 73) San Francisco, California, U.S.
- Genres: Hindustani classical music; Jazz fusion; World music
- Occupation: Musician
- Instrument: Tabla
- Years active: 1963–2024
- Label: His Master's Voice
- Website: Official website
- Honours: Padma Shri (1988); Padma Bhushan (2002); Padma Vibhushan (2023); Sangeet Natak Akademi Award (1990)

Ustad Zakir Hussain Qureshi (9 March 1951 – 15 December 2024) was an Indian tabla player, composer, arranger, percussionist, music producer and film actor who was based for much of his career in the San Francisco Bay Area. The eldest son of esteemed tabla player Alla Rakha, Zakir Hussain was widely regarded as the greatest tabla player of his generation and one of its finest percussionists. He produced music across multiple genres and contributed to popularizing Indian classical music to a global audience.

Often prefixed by the honorific title of 'Ustad', Hussain was awarded the United States National Endowment for the Arts' National Heritage Fellowship, the highest award given to traditional artists and musicians. He was also given the Government of India's Sangeet Natak Akademi Award in 1990 and the Sangeet Natak Akademi Fellowship, Ratna Sadsya, in 2018.

Hussain received nine Grammy Award nominations, winning four times, including three in 2024. He was described as the most recognizable exponent of the tabla by The Guardian. The New York Times marveled that the "blur of his fingers rivals the beat of a hummingbird's wings."

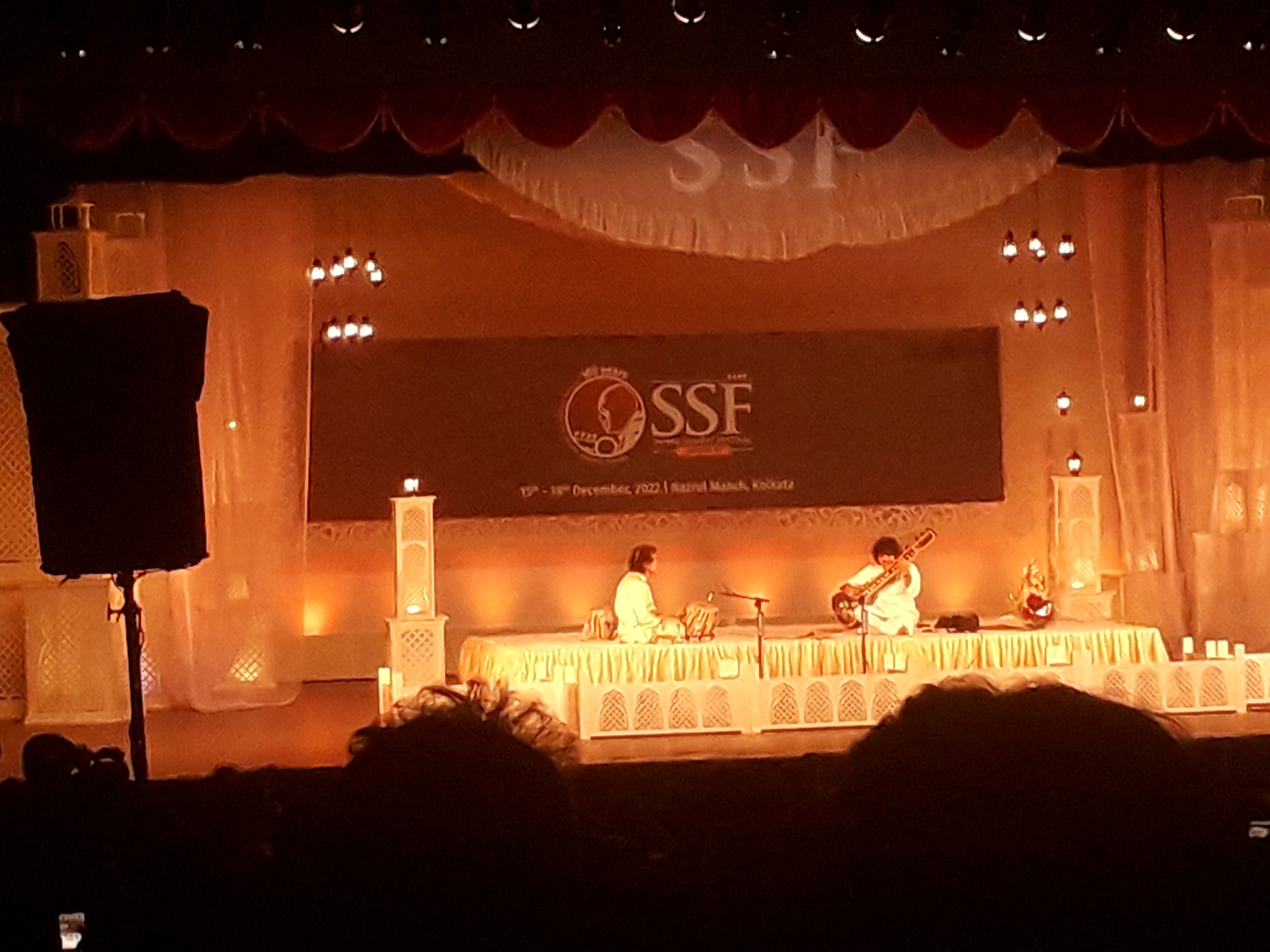
Hussain and Niladri Kumar, SSF-2022, Nazrul Mancha Kolkata

== Early life and education ==
Zakir Hussain Qureshi was born on 9 March 1951 in Bombay (Mumbai), Maharashtra, to Alla Rakha Qureshi, one of the most celebrated tabla players in the history of Indian classical music. His formal training in Hindustani classical music began at the age of seven, starting each of his mornings with three hours of tuition. He started performing in concerts at aged seven, and began touring by the age of twelve.

Hussain studied at St. Michael's High School in Mahim and graduated from St. Xavier's College in Mumbai. After college, he discovered the music of Jimi Hendrix and The Doors and considered becoming a rock drummer. However, he was soon dissuaded from this by George Harrison, lead guitarist of The Beatles, who told him that, as a tabla player, he could combine Eastern and Western music to create his own unique sound.

In the late 1960s, Hussain moved to San Francisco. There, he said he learnt as much from the Grateful Dead's drummer Mickey Hart as he had from his classical studies, including 'how to find the groove and understand the backbeat, and not to play too many notes'. He recalled jam sessions with the band lasting two or three days.

== Career ==
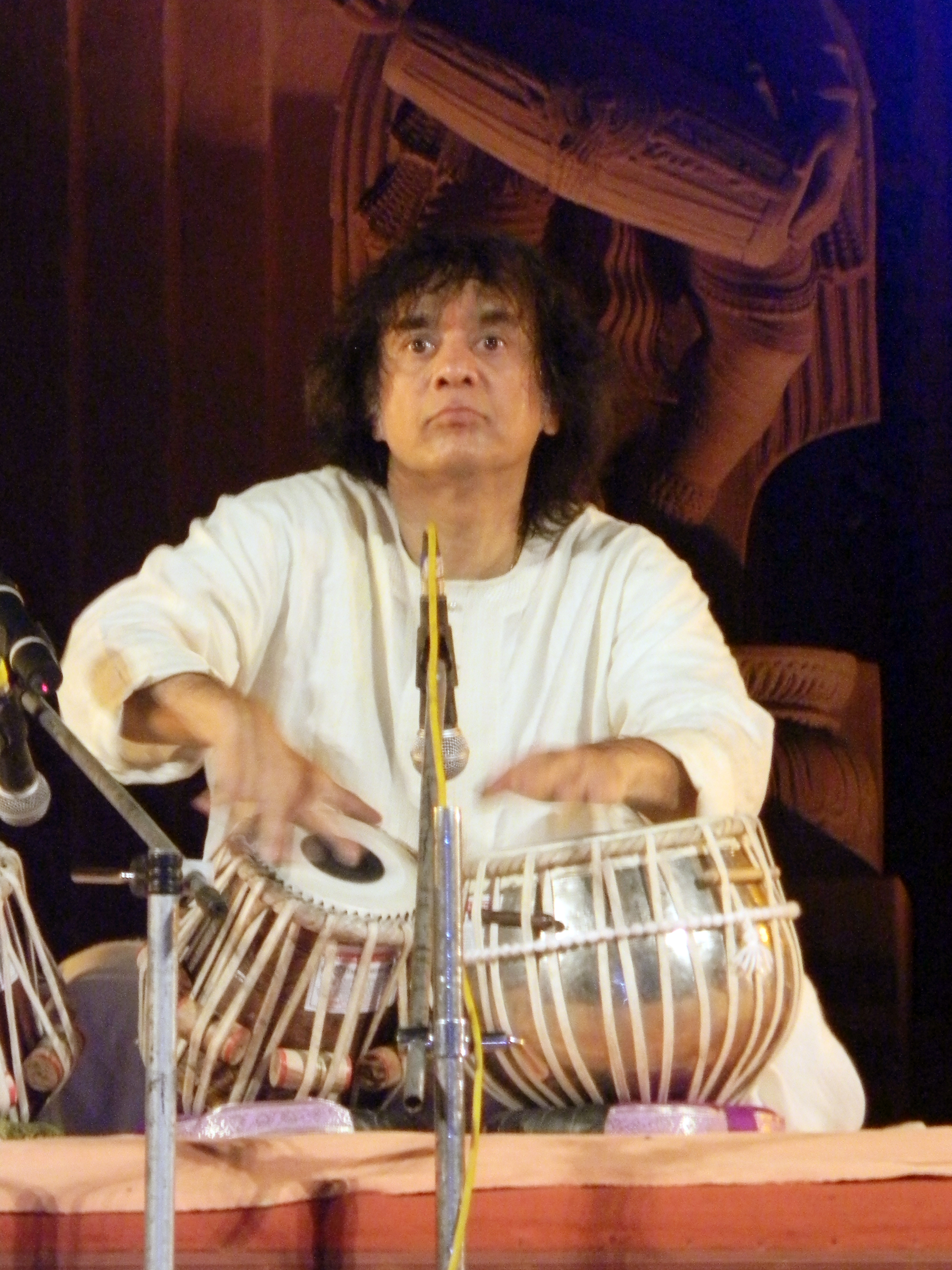
Hussain performing at Konark, Odisha

Hussain played on George Harrison's 1973 album Living in the Material World and John Handy's 1973 album Hard Work. He was a founder member of jazz-rock guitarist John McLaughlin's fusion group Shakti. Hussain also performed on Van Morrison's 1979 album Into the Music and Earth, Wind & Fire's 1983 album Powerlight.

Hussain performing tabla at Bharat Bhavan in Bhopal, 2019

Mickey Hart of the Grateful Dead, who had known Hussain since the 1960s, invited him to create the special album Planet Drum, featuring drummers from different parts of the world. Featured with Hussain, also from India, was Vikku Vinayakram, with whom he had collaborated in Shakti. The first Planet Drum album, released in 1991 on the Rykodisc label, earned the 1992 Grammy Award for Best World Music Album, the first Grammy ever awarded in this category. The Global Drum Project album and tour brought Grateful Dead drummer Mickey Hart, Hussain, Sikiru Adepoju, and Giovanni Hidalgo together again on the 15th anniversary of the Planet Drum album. The album Global Drum Project won the Grammy Award for Best Contemporary World Music Album at the 51st Grammy Awards Ceremony held on 8 February 2009.

Hussain composed, performed and acted as Indian music advisor for the Malayalam film Vanaprastham, a 1999 Cannes Film Festival entry which was nominated for the Grand Jury Prize at the AFI Los Angeles International Film Festival (AFI Fest) in 1999. It won awards at 2000 Istanbul International Film Festival (Turkey), 2000 Mumbai International Film Festival (India), and 2000 National Film Awards (India). He composed soundtracks for several movies, most notably In Custody and The Mystic Masseur by Ismail Merchant, and played tabla on the soundtracks of Francis Coppola's Apocalypse Now, Bernardo Bertolucci's Little Buddha, and other films. He starred in several films which showcased his musical performance, both solo and with different bands, including the 1998 documentary Zakir and His Friends and the documentary The Speaking Hand: Zakir Hussain and the Art of the Indian Drum (2003 Sumantra Ghosal). Hussain co-starred as Inder Lal in the 1983 Merchant Ivory film Heat and Dust, for which he was an associate music director. Hussain was a founding member of Bill Laswell's world music supergroup Tabla Beat Science.

For over eighteen years, Hussain's tablas were made by Haridas R. Vhatkar. Vhatkar said he learned how to make tablas so that he could make them for Hussain.

Hussain lived most of his life in America, but spent several months each year in his native India, making music for Bollywood films. In 1983, he acted in the Merchant-Ivory film Heat and Dust, opposite Julie Christie. On one of his return visits to Mumbai, he formed an ensemble, 'The Masters of Percussion', with musicians from different parts of the country, later touring the world with the group. He said his heritage was important to him, and two-thirds of his shows consisted purely of Indian music.

In 2016, Hussain was amongst many musicians invited by President Obama to the International Jazz Day 2016 All-Star Global Concert at the White House.

At the 66th Annual Grammy Awards on 4 February 2024, Hussain became the first musician from India to receive three Grammys at one ceremony: This Moment for Best Global Music Album, Pashto for the Best Global Music Performance, and As We Speak for Best Contemporary Instrumental Album, a live collaboration with bluegrass banjo player Bela Fleck and classical double bassist Edgar Meyer.

In a conversation with author Nasreen Munni Kabir, recorded in her book Zakir Hussain: A Life in Music, Hussain stated that he did not play at private gatherings, corporate events, or weddings. He believed that music should not be heard at events where people came to socialise, drink or eat, but instead should be the sole purpose of the event.

Hussain was named an Old Dominion Fellow by the Humanities Council at Princeton University, where he resided for the 2005–2006 semester as full professor in the music department. He was also a visiting professor at Stanford University. In May 2022, he was awarded the honorary Doctor of Law (LLD) degree for his contribution to the field of music by the University of Mumbai.

== Book ==
Nasreen Munni Kabir compiled fifteen interview sessions from 2016 through 2017, each lasting about two hours, into the book Zakir Hussain: A Life in Music, which was published in 2018. The book described Hussain's life from his youth, his years of intense training and his growth as a musician.

== Personal life ==
Hussain married Antonia Minnecola, a Kathak dancer and teacher, who was also his manager. They had two daughters, Anisa Qureshi and Isabella Qureshi. Anisa graduated from UCLA and is a film maker. Isabella is studying dance in Manhattan.

Hussain had two brothers: Taufiq Qureshi, a percussionist, and Fazal Qureshi, also a tabla player. Their brother Munawar died at a young age when he was attacked by a rabid dog. His eldest sister Bilquis died before Hussain was born. A sister, Razia, died from complications during cataract surgery, a few hours before their father's death in 2000. He had another sister, Khurshid.

In 2019, Hussain collaborated with neuroscientists at the University of California, San Francisco in an fMRI study of tabla perception and improvisation in the first neuroimaging investigation of Indian classical percussion. Published posthumously in 2026, it found that improvisation deactivated brain regions linked to conscious self-monitoring, a pattern previously seen only in jazz musicians.

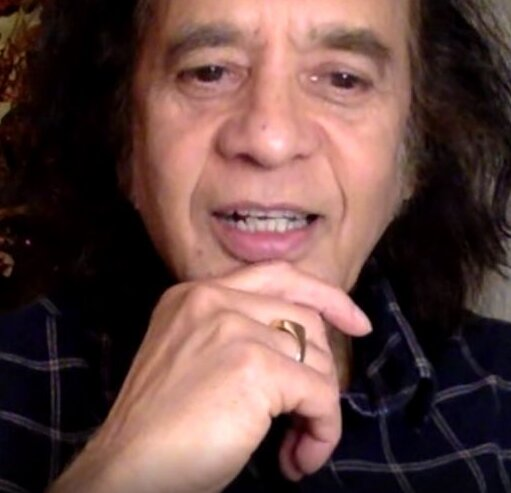
Hussain in December 2023

== Death and legacy ==
Hussain died on 15 December 2024 in San Francisco, California, from complications from idiopathic pulmonary fibrosis. He was 73.

Hussain was one of the world's greatest tabla players. English guitarist John McLaughlin, who performed with Hussain in the band Shakti, described him as "the King, in whose hands, rhythm became magic."

== Discography ==
Title	Date	Collaborators
Evening Ragas	1970	Vasant Rai
Shanti	1971	
Rolling Thunder	1972	Mickey Hart
Shakti	1975	Shakti with John McLaughlin
Karuna Supreme	1976	John Handy with Ali Akbar Khan
Hard Work	1976	John Handy
A Handful of Beauty	1976	Shakti with John McLaughlin
Diga	1976	Diga Rhythm Band
Natural Elements	1977	Shakti with John McLaughlin
Morning Ragas	1979	Vasant Rai
Who's to Know	1980	L. Shankar
Song for Everyone	1985	L. Shankar
Making Music	1987	Jan Garbarek, John McLaughlin and Hariprasad Chaurasia
Tabla Duet	1988	Alla Rakha
Venu	1989	Hariprasad Chaurasia
At the Edge	1990	Mickey Hart
Maestro's Choice Series One	1991	Alla Rakha
Planet Drum	1991	Mickey Hart
When Words Disappear	1991	David Trasoff
Flights of Improvisation	1992	
Sangeet Sartaj	1992	
The One and Only	1992	
Zakir Hussain and the Rhythm Experience	1992	
Hazir	1992	Hariharan (singer)
Music of the Deserts	1993	
Rag Madhuvanti / Rag Misra Tilang	1993	Shivkumar Sharma
Concert for Peace	1993	Ravi Shankar
Rag Rageshri	1993	Shivkumar Sharma
Jog And Rageshri	1994	
Ustad Amjad Ali Khan & Zakir Hussain	1994	Amjad Ali Khan
Golden Krithis Colours	1994	Kunnakudi Vaidyanathan
Raga Aberi	1995	L. Shankar
Maestro's Choice – Series Two	1995	Sultan Khan|
Raag Maand Bhairav	1995	Vilayat Khan
World Network Series, Vol. 1: India- Raga Purya Kalyan	1995	Shivkumar Sharma
The Elements – Space	1996	
Mickey Hart's Mystery Box	1996	Mickey Hart
Kirwani	1997	
Magical Moments of Rhythm	1997	
And the Rhythm Experience	1998	
Essence of Rhythm	1998	
Night Spinner	1998	George Brooks
Supralingua	1998	Mickey Hart
Fire Dance	1998	Pat Martino
Save Our Children	1998	Pharoah Sanders
Remember Shakti	1999	Remember Shakti
Spirit into Sound	1999	Mickey Hart
The Believer	2000	Remember Shakti
Tala Matrix	2000	Tabla Beat Science
Golden Strings of the Sarode	2001	Aashish Khan
Saturday Night in Bombay	2001	Remember Shakti
Selects	2002	
Summit	2002	George Brooks
The Best of Mickey Hart: Over the Edge and Back	2002	Mickey Hart
Live in San Francisco at Stern Grove	2002	Tabla Beat Science
Ustad Mohammad Omar: Virtuoso from Afghanistan	2002	
Energy	2003	
Live at Miles Davis Hall	2004	Remember Shakti
Live at 38th Montreux Jazz Festival	2004	Remember Shakti
Punjabi Dhamar	2004	
Raag Chandrakauns	2004	
Shared Moments	2004	Alla Rakha
Sangam	2006	Charles Lloyd, Eric Harland
Soukha	2006	V. Selvaganesh (with John McLaughlin, U. Srinivas, Vikku Vinayakram)
Global Drum Project	2007	Mickey Hart, Imran Hussain, Chandan Sharma, Sikiru Adepoju, Giovanni Hidalgo
The Melody of Rhythm	2009	Bela Fleck, Edgar Meyer
Mysterium Tremendum	2012	Mickey Hart Band
Good Hope	2019	Dave Holland, Chris Potter
Is That So?	2020	John McLaughlin, Shankar Mahadevan
In the Groove	2022	Mickey Hart
Trios: Sacred Thread	2022	Charles Lloyd, Julian Lage
As We Speak	2023	Béla Fleck, Edgar Meyer, with Rakesh Chaurasia
This Moment	2023	Shakti

== Filmography ==
- Heat and Dust (1983)
- The Perfect Murder (1988)
- Thanthu Vitten Ennai (1991 Tamil movie)
- Miss Beatty's Children (1992)
- Saaz (1998)
- Zakir and His Friends (1998)
- The Speaking Hand: Zakir Hussain and the Art of the Indian Drum (2003) – Sumantra Ghosal
- Talamanam Sound Clash – Further Adventures in Hype (2003 – DVD) – Tabla Beat Science
- The Way of Beauty (2006 – DVD) – Remember Shakti
- The Rhythm Devils Concert Experience (2008 – DVD) – The Rhythm Devils
- Manto (2018)
- Monkey Man (2024) as a tabla maestro

== Soundtracks ==
- In Custody (1993)
- Little Buddha (1993)
- Saaz (1998)
- Vanaprastham (1999)
- The Mystic Masseur (2001)
- Mr. and Mrs. Iyer (2002)
- One Dollar Curry (2003)

== Awards and honours ==
- Hussain was awarded the titles of Padma Shri in 1988, Padma Bhushan in 2002, and Padma Vibhushan in 2023.
- Awarded the Indo-American Award in 1990 in recognition of his outstanding cultural contribution to relations between the United States and India.
- Presented with the Sangeet Natak Akademi Award in 1990 by the President of India, making him one of the youngest musicians to receive this recognition given by the Sangeet Natak Academy, India's National Academy of Music, Dance & Drama.
- In 1992 Planet Drum, an album co-created and produced by Hussain and Mickey Hart, was awarded the first-ever Grammy for Best World Music Album, the Downbeat Critics' Poll for Best World Beat Album and the NARM Indie Best Seller Award for a World Music Recording.
- Recipient of a 1999 National Heritage Fellowship from the National Endowment for the Arts, the United States government's honour for a master in the traditional arts, presented by First Lady Hillary Clinton at the United States Senate on 28 September 1999.
- In 2005, he was named an Old Dominion Fellow by the Humanities Council at Princeton University, where he resided for the 2005–2006 semester as full professor in the music department, teaching a survey course in Indian classical music and dance.
- Recipient of the Kalidas Samman in 2006, an award for artists of exceptional achievement, from the Government of Madhya Pradesh.
- Golden Strings of the Sarode (Moment! Records 2006) with Aashish Khan and Hussain was nominated for a Grammy in the Best Traditional World Music Album category in 2006.
- In 2007, readers' polls from both Modern Drummer and Drum! magazines named Hussain Best World Music and Best World Beat Drummer respectively.
- On 8 February 2009 for the 51st Grammy Awards, Hussain won the Grammy in the Contemporary World Music Album category for his collaborative album Global Drum Project along with Mickey Hart, Sikiru Adepoju & Giovanni Hidalgo.
- On 23 February 2012 for Guru Gangadhar Pradhan Lifetime Achievement Award at Konark Dance & Music Festival, organised by Konark Natya Mandap
- Summer of 2016, he was nominated for President's Medal of the Arts, however, new rule stated non-Americans could not receive the medal.
- On 18 January 2017, San Francisco Jazz Center gave Hussain a Lifetime Achievement Award
- In 2019, Sangeet Natak Academy, India's National Academy of Music, Dance & Drama, honored Hussain with the Academy Fellow award, also known as the Academy Ratna, for the year 2018.
- In 2022, he was conferred the honorary Doctor of Law (LLD) degree for his exceptional contribution in the field of music by Mumbai University.
- On 17 June 2022, he was named by the non-profit Inamori Foundation to receive the Kyoto Prize, Japan's highest private award for global achievement, in the category of Arts and Philosophy (field: Music).
- On 4 February 2024, Hussain received three awards at the 66th Annual Grammy Awards. Hussain's first win came for Pashto, written and recorded in collaboration with American banjo player Béla Fleck, American bassist Edgar Meyer and Indian flautist Rakesh Chaurasia. Hussain's second Grammy of the night was for Best Contemporary Instrumental Album, which he won alongside Fleck, Meyer and Chaurasia, for the eclectic classical-meets-jazz album, As We Speak. His third win of the night came for the album This Moment, the critically acclaimed comeback of the pioneering world-fusion band Shakti.
- Hussain received two nominations for the 2026 Grammy Awards. His album with Shakti titled Mind Explosion (50th Anniversary Tour Live) received a nomination in the Best Global Music Album category, and the song "Shrini's Dream (Live)", from the same album, received a nomination in the Best Global Music Performance category. With these nominations, his Grammy totals reached 4 wins and 9 nominations.

== Tribute ==
The line "Zakir Hussain Tabela Ivaltana" in the Tamil song "Telephone Manipol" in the 1996 film Indian, directed by S. Shankar is a tribute to him. This song was written by poet Vairamuthu.
