= Selects (album) =

Studio album by Zakir Hussain
- Released: 2002
- Genre: World
- Length: 1:02:12
- Label: Moment Records
- Producers: Zakir Hussain & Antonia Minnecola

Selects is an album by Indian tabla musician Zakir Hussain. It was released on the Moment Records label in 2002.

== Track listing ==
No.	Title	Length
1.	"Pune, January, 1997"	17:02
2.	"Ahmedabad, January, 1999"	13:46
3.	"Pune, January, 1997"	13:59
4.	"Mumbai, January 2000 & San Francisco, October, 1994"	6:41
5.	"Ahmedabad, January 1999"	3:47
6.	"Mumbai, January 2000"	6:57

== Personnel ==
- Zakir Hussain - Tabla
