= Fredric Lieberman =

Fredric Lieberman (1940 - died May 4, 2013) was an American ethnomusicologist, composer, music professor, and author. As a faculty member at the University of California, Santa Cruz, he was affiliated with the Music Department. He became known for teaching and studying the Grateful Dead and in finding a home for the band's archives at the university's McHenry Library and for his collaboration with Grateful Dead drummer Mickey Hart on three of Hart's books: Planet Drum, Drumming at the Edge of Magic, and Spirit Into Sound.

Fredric Lieberman was a pioneer in North-American ethnomusicology, by opening the field to East Asian music practice and its relations to theory and civilization. His major contribution, his PhD thesis, was the transcription/translation of an important music book, a manual with real musical pieces to be learned and played, from an identified tradition: the Mei'an Qinpu 梅庵琴譜 by master Wang Binlu 王賓魯 from Zhucheng 諸城, written by Xu Lisun 徐立孫 and Shao Sen 邵森, from Nantong 南通, first published 1931. Shortly before his death, Fredric Lieberman participated in the 15th International CHIME Conference, held at the Goetheanum, Dornach, Switzerland. During this meeting, he expressed regret that his book was out of print and faced with the publisher's refusal to reprint it. He therefore shared a pdf edition which he asked scholars to distribute.

Lieberman's early research focused on East Asian musics (especially Chinese music, but his geographic areas of interest included Japan, Korea, Bhutan, Tibet, and South India), then American vernacular music (from Tin Pan Alley to contemporary rock), as well as his work on theories of organology and copyright law (as applied to music and intellectual property). He was an avid collector of traditional musical instruments from around the world. Still active in the professional milieu till the end of his life, he took the responsibility of the Klaus P. Wachsmann Prize for the best essay in organology annually awarded by the Society for Ethnomusicology.

He was a composer of music and published several of his compositions. He co-authored a biographical study of composer Lou Harrison with Dr. Leta Miller and authored numerous other publications.

== History ==
Fredric Lieberman was raised in New York and graduated from Fieldston High School in 1958. He attended the Eastman School of Music where he graduated with a Bachelors in Music with a focus in composition, musicology, and conducting. Lieberman continued his education by receiving a master's degree from the University of Hawaiʻi at Mānoa in Ethnomusicology. In 1968 he was given his Ph.D. in music with an emphasis in ethnomusicology from the University of California, Los Angeles. Through the years he has taught at Brown University, the University of Washington, and eventually settled at the University of California, Santa Cruz.

Lieberman co-wrote three books with Mickey Hart and was a consultant for him on various projects. One of these, Planet Drum: A Celebration of Percussion and Rhythm, also co-written by D.A. Sonneborn, examines rhythm's role in cultural traditions and considers the primal percussion experience of the "Big Bang.". He also co-wrote with Leta E. Miller, Lou Harrison (2006); a study of the life and career of Lou Harrison (1917–2003), and he also wrote Chinese music: An annotated bibliography (1979).

Lieberman also started and was CEO of his own company named Music Forensics in which he consulted with attorneys and musicians over copyright laws.

Lieberman died on May 4, 2013, due to cardiac arrest.

== Publications ==
- Hart, Mickey; Lieberman, Fredric. Spirit into Sound: The Magic of Music. (August 30, 2006). Grateful Dead Productions. ISBN 1-888358-23-8 (ISBN 9781888358230).
- Hart, Mickey; Sonneborn, D.A.; Lieberman, Fredric. (1991, August 1998). Planet Drum: A Celebration of Percussion and Rhythm. Grateful Dead Productions. ISBN 1-888358-20-3 (ISBN 9781888358209).
- Hart, Mickey; Stevens, Jay; Lieberman, Fredric. Drumming at the Edge of Magic: A Journey into the Spirit of Percussion. (1990, December 28, 1998). Grateful Dead Productions. ISBN 1-888358-18-1 (ISBN 9781888358186).
- Hart, Mickey; Stevens, Jay; Lieberman, Fredric. Die magische Trommel. Eine Reise zu den Quellen des Rhythmus . (1991, 1993). Goldmann Wilhelm GmbH. ISBN 3-442-12156-6 (ISBN 9783442121564).
- Lieberman, Fredric. Chinese music: An annotated bibliography (Garland reference library of the humanities; v. 75). (January 1, 1979). Garland Pub. ISBN 0-8240-9922-2 (ISBN 9780824099220).
- Lieberman, Fredric and Miller, Leta E. . Lou Harrison. (June 5, 2006). University of Illinois Press. ISBN 0-252-03120-2 (ISBN 9780252031205).
- Miller, Leta E.; Lieberman, Fredric. (1998). Composing a world: Lou Harrison, musical wayfarer. University of Illinois Press, ISBN 0-252-07188-3, (ISBN 9780252071881)

== See also ==
- Chinese Music
