= Diga (album) =

Studio album by Diga Rhythm Band
- Released: 1976
- Recorded: 1976
- Studio: The Barn, Marin County, California
- Genre: World music
- Length: 40:05
- Label: Round Records
- Producer: Mickey Hart

Mickey Hart chronology
Rolling Thunder (1972)	Diga (1976)	The Apocalypse Now Sessions (1980)

Diga is an album by the Diga Rhythm Band, a percussion-based music ensemble led by Grateful Dead drummer Mickey Hart and by Zakir Hussain. It was released by Round Records as a vinyl LP in 1976. It was remixed and released on CD by Rykodisc Records in 1988.

The ensemble, originally called the Tal Vadya Rhythm Band, was founded in 1973 by Zakir Hussain, at the Ali Akbar College of Music. Mickey Hart joined in 1975, and Hussain and Hart renamed the group the Diga Rhythm Band. Diga was recorded in 1976 at Hart's studio The Barn in Novato, California.

Jerry Garcia plays guitar on two of the album's five tracks. The song "Happiness Is Drumming" is an early, instrumental version of "Fire on the Mountain".

== Critical reception ==
Professional ratings
Review scores
Source	Rating
Allmusic	3/5 stars
The Music Box	3/5 stars

On Allmusic, Jeff Tamarkin called Diga "a compelling and powerful recording that draws in the listener with its spellbinding rhythms."

Writing in The Music Box in 2008, John Metzger said that the album "effectively introduced percussion-driven, globally minded grooves to an entirely new audience. It also was far ahead of its time... Diga is, in hindsight, a very uneven affair... If viewed from the perspective that it was the beginning rather than the end of a journey, it's much easier to see Diga's charms."

== Track listing ==
=== Original LP version ===
All tracks are written by Diga Rhythm Band, except where noted.

Side one
No.	Title	Writer(s)	Length
1.	"Razooli"	Ray Spiegel	2:50
2.	"Happiness is Drumming"		3:17
3.	"Tal Mala"	Ustad Alla Rahka, Diga Rhythm Band	12:48

Side two
No.	Title	Length
1.	"Sweet Sixteen"	8:03
2.	"Magnificent Sevens"	12:55

=== CD Version ===
When the album was released on CD, the tracks were re-ordered to: "Sweet Sixteen", "Magnificent Sevens", "Happiness Is Drumming", "Razooli", "Tal Mala".

== Personnel ==
=== Diga Rhythm Band ===
- Mickey Hart – traps, gongs, timbales, timpani
- Zakir Hussain – tabla, folk drums, tar
- Jordan Amarantha – congas, bongos
- Peter Carmichael – tabla
- Aushim Chaudhuri – tabla
- Vince Delgado – dumbek, tabla, talking drum
- Tor Dietrichson – tabla
- Jim Loveless – marimbas
- Joy Shulman – tabla
- Ray Spiegel – vibes
- Arshad Syed – duggi tarang, nal

=== Additional musicians ===
- Jerry Garcia – guitar on "Happiness is Drumming", "Razooli"
- Jim McPherson – vocals on "Razooli"
- Kathy MacDonald – vocals on "Razooli"
- David Freiberg – vocals on "Razooli"

=== Production ===
- Mickey Hart – producer
- Vince Delgado – associate producer
- Zakir Hussain – production and arranging associate
- Dan Healy – recording
- Willy Wolf – recording
- Betty Cantor – recording
- Brett Cohen – assistant engineer
- Jordan De La Sierra – cover art
- Onehart – photograph
- Steven Jurgensmeyer – package design

CD remix:

- Tom Flye – engineer
- Tom Size – assistant engineer
- Joe Gastwirt – digital mastering

Dedication:

- "This album is dedicated to our friend and teacher Ustad Alla Rakha, and to all drummers everywhere".
