= Giovanni Hidalgo =

Puerto Rican percussionist & educator (born 1963)

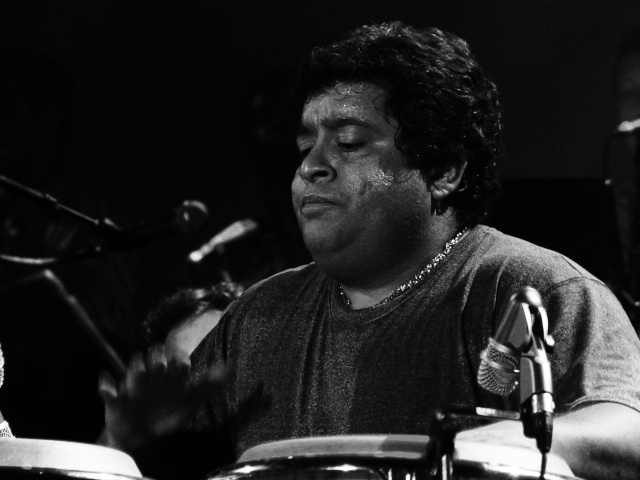

Background information
- Born: November 22, 1963 (age 62); San Juan, Puerto Rico
- Genres: Latin jazz; world music
- Occupations: Musician; educator
- Instrument: Percussion

Giovanni Hidalgo (born November 22, 1963, in San Juan, Puerto Rico), also known as "Mañenguito", is a Grammy Award-winning Latin jazz percussionist, widely regarded as one of the greatest conga players in the world. Renowned for his virtuosic speed, precision, and innovation, he revolutionized hand drumming by blending Afro-Caribbean rhythms with jazz, funk, and other global influences.

Hidalgo gained international prominence in the 1980s through collaborations with artists such as Dizzy Gillespie, Eddie Palmieri, and Mickey Hart. He was a core member of Gillespie’s United Nations Orchestra and co-winner of the Grammy Award for Best Global Music Album in 1992 for *Planet Drum* alongside Mickey Hart and other percussion legends.

A dedicated educator, Hidalgo served as a professor at Berklee College of Music and has mentored generations of percussionists around the world. Despite health challenges in recent years, he continues to perform, record, and tour internationally, including recent trio work and upcoming performances across the United States and Europe.

== Early years ==
Hidalgo was born in San Juan, Puerto Rico, where he received his primary education. His grandfather was a musician, and his father, José Manuel Hidalgo "Mañengue", was a renowned conga player. Hidalgo was raised in a household surrounded by drums, bongos, congas, and timbales. For his eighth birthday, he received a conga which was handmade by his father. As a young child, he practiced and developed his skills on the conga and on other instruments in his house. Hidalgo would drum a tune with sticks and then play the same tune with his hands.

== Music career ==
Hidalgo auditioned and was hired by the Batacumbele Band in 1980. In 1981, he traveled with the band to Cuba, where he met a musician by the name José Luis Quintana, a.k.a. Changuito. They created a style of rhythm that ushered in a new era in Latin music.

In 1985, Hidalgo was performing with Eddie Palmieri at the Village Gate in New York City when Dizzy Gillespie walked in and listened to him play. Gillespie was so impressed with Hidalgo that he told him that someday in the future they must get together and play. In 1988 Hidalgo joined Gillespie's United Nation Orchestra.

In 1992, Hidalgo was hired as an adjunct professor at the Berklee College of Music in Boston. He held this position until 1996.

During his career, he has worked with Bola Abimbola, Sikiru Adepoju, Art Blakey, Muruga Booker, Jack Bruce, Don Byron, Candido Camero, D'Angelo, Paulinho da Costa, Steve Gadd, Sammy Hagar, Kip Hanrahan, Zakir Hussain, Cassius Khan, Airto Moreira, Charlie Palmieri, Tito Puente, Hilton Ruiz, Paul Simon, and Carlos "Patato" Valdes.

On October 31, 2010, he performed with the rock band Phish during their Halloween concert. The band performed Waiting for Columbus by Little Feat with Hidalgo on percussion (with the exception of "Don't Bogart That Joint", which was performed a cappella) and a brass section of Aaron Johnson, Stuart Bogie, Ian Hendrickson, Michael Leonhart, and Eric Biondo.

In October 2016, Giovanni Hidalgo underwent the amputation of his left ring finger due to a health complication. Demonstrating remarkable resilience and creativity, he has since adapted his technique to include the use of sticks and other innovative methods. Despite this challenge, Hidalgo remains active in the music world, performing, teaching, and inspiring a new generation of musicians. In recent years, he has focused on small ensemble projects, including a new trio format that highlights his artistry in intimate and exploratory musical settings. His continued evolution as a musician has only deepened his legacy as one of the most influential percussionists of all time.

== Awards and honors ==
In 1991, Hidalgo received a Grammy Award for his contribution to the album Planet Drum (Rykodisc, 1991), performed by an ensemble of the same name led by Mickey Hart of The Grateful Dead. He played on another one of Hart's Grammy-winning albums, Global Drum Project and on the album Danzón (Dance On) (GRP, 1993) by Arturo Sandoval which won the 1995 Grammy Award for Best Latin Jazz Performance. Hands of Rhythm (RMM, 1997), Hidalgo's album with Michel Camilo, received a Grammy nomination, as did The Body Acoustic (Chesky, 2004), al album recorded by Hidalgo, David Chesky, Randy Brecker, Bob Mintzer, and Andy Gonzalez.

In May 2010, Hidalgo was awarded an Honorary Doctorate of Music from Berklee College of Music during the sixteenth consecutive year that faculty members from the school visited Puerto Rico for one of its global outreach programs.

He is a recipient of a 2026 National Heritage Fellowship awarded by the National Endowment for the Arts, which is the United States government's highest honor in the folk and traditional arts.

== Discography ==
=== As leader ===
- 1992: Villa Hidalgo (Pimienta)
- 1993: Worldwide (RMM)
- 1995: Time Shifter (RMM)
- 1997: Hands of Rhythm (RMM)
- 1999: Best Friends (Sony)
- 2024: Jubilation (Instituto Cultura Puertorriqueña)

=== As sideman ===
With Batacumbele

- 1981: Con Un Poco De Songo (Tierrazo, TLP-008)
- 1983: En Aquellos Tiempos (Tierrazo, TLP-0011)
- 1987: Afro Caribbean Jazz (Montuno)
- 1988: In Concert: Live at the University of Puerto Rico (Montuno)
- 1999: Hijos del Tambó (Casa de los Tapes)

With Zaperoko

- 1984: Still Crazy (Montuno)
- 1986: Tarde en la Noche (Zap's)
- 2006: Zaperoko 3 (Libertad)

With Dave Valentin

- 1987: Mind Time (GRP)
- 1988: Live at the Blue Note (GRP)

With Kip Hanrahan

- 1985: Few Short Notes From the End Run (Justin Time)
- 1990: Tenderness (Yellowbird)
- 1995: All Roads Are Made of the Flesh (American Clave)

With Airto Moreira

- 1986: Aqui Se Puede (Montuno)
- 1989: Samba De Flora (Montuno)
- 1992: The Other Side of This (Rykodisc)
- 2000: Homeless
- 2003: Life After That (Narada)

With Hilton Ruiz

- 1992: Manhattan Mambo Soundtrack (Telarc)
- 1992: Live at Birdland (Candid)
- 1995: Hands on Percussion (RMM)

With Paquito D'Rivera

- 1987: Celebration (Columbia)
- 1990: Reunion (Termidor)

With Eddie Palmieri

- 1984: Palo Pá Rumba (Fania)
- 1985: Solito (Fania)
- 1987: The Truth-La Verdad (Fania)
- 2005: Listen Here! (Concord)

With Jazz Hamilton

- 2008: My Soul (Akoustik)

With The Brian Lynch / Eddie Palmieri Project

- 2006: Simpático (ArtistShare)

With Tito Puente

- 1992: Live at the Village Gate (Tropi Jazz)
- 1993: Golden Latin Jazz All Stars in Session (RMM)
- 2002: Live at the Playboy Jazz Festival (Playboy Jazz)

With Mickey Hart

- 1991: Planet Drum (Rykodisc)
- 1998: Supralingua (Rykodisc)
- 1996: Mickey Hart's Mystery Box (Rykodisc)
- 2009: Global Drum Project (Shout! Factory)
- 2012: Mysterium Tremendum (360° Productions)
- 2022: In the Groove (Valley Entertainment)

With Flora Purim

- 1992: Queen of the Night(Sound Wave)
- 1994: Speed of Light (Meltdown/B&W)
- 2002: Flora Purim Sings Milton Nascimento (Narada)
- 2005: Flora's Song (Narada)

With Humberto Ramirez

- 1992: Jazz Project (Tropi Jazz)
- 1993: Aspects (RMM)
- 1999: Best Friends (Sony Discos)

With Michel Camilo

- 1994: One More Once (Columbia)
- 2011: Mano a Mano (EmArcy/Pgd)

With Freddie Hubbard

- 1991: Bolivia (Musicmasters)
- 1998: God Bless the Child (Musicmasters)

With Dizzy Gillespie

- 1989: Live at the Royal Festival Hall (Enja)
- 2007: Live at the Jazz Plaza Festival 1985 (MVD)

With McCoy Tyner

- 1999: McCoy Tyner & The Latin All-Stars (Telarc)
- 2007: Afro Blue (Telarc)

With Jerry Rivera

- 1990: Abriendo Puertas (Discos CBS)
- 2009: DOS Clasicos (Sony)

With others

- 1986: Word Up! – Cameo (Mercury)
- 1986: Llegó el Gavilán – Kim de los Santos (Pa'Lante Records)
- 1989: Kim de los Santos – Kim de los Santos (Musical Productions)
- 1992: Pintando Lunas – Domingo Quiñones (RMM)
- 1993: Heroes – Hilton Ruiz (Telarc)
- 1993: Danzon (Dance On) – Arturo Sandoval (GRP)
- 1996: Evolucionando – Johnny Almendra (RMM)
- 1997: Marching to Mars – Sammy Hagar (Universal)
- 1998: Larry Harlow's Latin Legend Band – Larry Harlow (Sony Discos)
- 1998: Antiguo – Gonzalo Rubalcaba (Blue Note)
- 1998: Havana Blues – Armando Rodriguez (Palmetto)
- 2000: Rhythms for a New Millennium – Alex Acuña (Tonga)
- 2000: Best Kept Secret – Ralph Irizarry (Shanachie)
- 2000: Conga Kings – Candido Camero (Chesky)
- 2000: Galeria Caribe – Ricardo Arjona (Sony)
- 2000: Imprint – John Patitucci (Concord Jazz)
- 2000: Voodoo – D'Angelo (Cheeba/Virgin)
- 2001: Yo Por Ti – Olga Tañón (Warner Bros.)
- 2001: TNT (Trombone-N-Tenor) – Steve Turre (Telarc)
- 2001: Jazz Descargas – Conga Kings (Chesky)
- 2002: Mondo Head – Kodo (Red Ink)
- 2002: Together Again – Juan Pablo Torres (MusicHaus)
- 2002: Lo Bueno De La Vida – Orlando Poleo (Sony)
- 2004: Body Acoustic – Body Acoustic (Chesky)
- 2004: Desahogo – Vico-C (EMI)
- 2004: My Music, My Friends, My Time – Oskar Cartaya (O.Y.E.)
- 2004: Como Nunca...Como Siempre – Limi-T 21 (EMI Latin)
- 2005: Sabor Cubano – Alina Izquierdo (Pimienta)
- 2006: Descarga En California – Rebeca Mauleon (Pimienta)
- 2006: Masa Con Masa – Millo Torres (Machete)
- 2006: Codes – Ignacio Berroa (Blue Note)
- 2006: Telegrafia Sin Hilo – Changuito (Cacao Musica)
- 2007: De Corazon A Corazon – Team Vip (Union Music Group)
- 2007: Jazz, Baby! – Doug Beavers (Origin)
- 2007: En Primera Plana – Issac Delgado (La Calle)
- 2007: 90 Millas – Gloria Estefan (Solar Music Group)
- 2008: Canto a America Latina – Andres Jimenez (Cuatro Menguante)

== Filmography ==
- 1995 - Conga Virtuoso (DVD) Warner Bros.
- 1996 - In The Tradition (DVD) Warner Bros.
- 2004 - Traveling Through Time (with Horacio Hernandez) (DVD) Music Video Distributors

== See also ==
- List of conga players
