= Babatunde Olatunji =

Nigerian drummer and educator (1927–2003)

- Born: Michael Babatunde Olatunji; April 7, 1927; Ajido, Lagos State, British Nigeria
- Died: April 6, 2003 (aged 75) Salinas, California
- Genres: Yoruba music; Apala
- Instruments: Drums; percussion; djembe
- Years active: 1959–2003
- Labels: Columbia; CBS; Narada; Virgin; EMI; Chesky
- Website: olatunjimusic.com

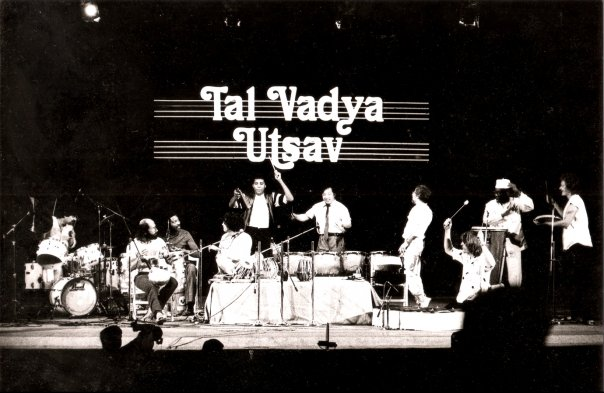
Babatunde Olatunji, second from right, at the Tal Vadya Utsav International Drums & Percussion Festival, Siri Fort Auditorium, New Delhi, 1985

Michael Babatunde Olatunji (April 7, 1927 – April 6, 2003) was a Nigerian drummer, educator, social activist, and recording artist.

== Early life ==
Olatunji was born in the village of Ajido, near Badagry, Lagos State, in southwestern Nigeria. A member of the Ogu (Egun) people, Olatunji was introduced to traditional African music at an early age. His name, Bàbátúndé, means 'father has returned', because he was born two months after his father, Zannu, died, and Olatunji was considered to be a reincarnation of him. His father was a local fisherman who was about to rise to the rank of chieftain, and his mother was a potter. Olatunji grew up speaking the Gun (Ogu/Egun) and Yoruba languages. His maternal grandmother and a great-grandmother were priestesses of the Vodun and Ogu religions, and they worshipped the Vodun, such as Kori, the goddess of fertility.

Due to his father's premature death, from an early age he was groomed to take the position as chief. When he was 12, he realized that he did not want to become a chieftain. He read in Reader's Digest magazine about the Rotary International Foundation's scholarship program, and applied for it. His application was successful and he went to the United States in 1950 to attend Morehouse College in Atlanta, Georgia.

== Education ==
In Morehouse, Olatunji became good friends with Morehouse College Glee Club director Dr. Wendell P. Whalum. He never sang in the Glee Club, but collaborated with Whalum on a staple of the choir's repertoire, "Betelehemu", a Nigerian Christmas carol. After graduating, he went on to New York University to study public administration. There, he started a small percussion group to earn money on the side while he continued his studies.

== Career ==
After hearing Olatunji perform with the 66 piece Radio City Music Hall orchestra Columbia Records signed Olatunji to the Columbia label in 1958. One year later he released his first of six records on the Columbia label, called Drums of Passion. Drums of Passion became a major hit and remains in print; it introduced many Americans to world music. Drums of Passion also served as the band's name.

Olatunji won a following among jazz musicians, by infusing Nigerian rhythms with elements drawn from Ghanaian and Afro-Caribbean traditions. Most notably creating a strong relationship with John Coltrane, with whose help he founded the Olatunji Center for African Culture in Harlem. This was the site of Coltrane's final recorded performance in 1967. Coltrane wrote the composition "Tunji" on the 1962 album Coltrane in dedication to him. Olatunji recorded with many other prominent musicians (often credited as "Michael Olatunji"), including Cannonball Adderley (on his 1961 African Waltz album), Horace Silver, Quincy Jones, Pee Wee Ellis, Stevie Wonder, Randy Weston, and with Max Roach and Abbey Lincoln on the pivotal Freedom Now Suite aka We Insist!, and with Grateful Dead member Mickey Hart on his Grammy winning Planet Drum projects. He is also mentioned in the lyrics of Bob Dylan's "I Shall Be Free," recorded for the album The Freewheelin' Bob Dylan.

In 1969, Carlos Santana had a major hit with his cover version of "Jin-go-lo-ba" from Olatunji's first album, which Santana recorded on his debut album, Santana, as "Jingo". Olatunji's subsequent recordings include Drums of Passion: The Invocation (1988), Drums of Passion: The Beat (1989) (which included Airto Moreira and Carlos Santana), Love Drum Talk (1997), Circle of Drums (2005; originally titled Cosmic Rhythm Vibrations, with Muruga Booker and Sikiru Adepoju), and Olatunji Live at Starwood (2003 – recorded at the 1997 Starwood Festival with guest Halim El-Dabh). He also contributed to Peace Is the World Smiling: A Peace Anthology for Families on the Music for Little People label (1993).

=== Film and theatre ===
Olatunji composed music for the Broadway theatrical and the 1961 Hollywood film productions of Raisin in the Sun. He assisted Bill Lee with the music for his son Spike Lee's hit film She's Gotta Have It.

=== Activism ===
Olatunji was known for making an impassioned speech for social justice before performing in front of a live audience. His progressive political beliefs are outlined in The Beat of My Drum: An Autobiography, with a foreword by Joan Baez, (Temple University Press, 2005). He toured the American south with Rev. Martin Luther King Jr. and joined King in the march on Washington.

When he performed before the United Nations General Assembly, Soviet Premier Nikita Khrushchev took off his shoes and danced. Later, he was one of the first outside performers to perform in Prague at Václav Havel's request. On July 21, 1979, he appeared at the Amandla Festival along with Bob Marley, Dick Gregory, Patti LaBelle, and Eddie Palmieri, amongst others.

=== Teaching career ===
Olatunji was a music educator, and invented a method of teaching and recording drum patterns which he called the "Gun-Dun, Go-Do, Pa-Ta" method after the different sounds made on the drum. He taught drum and dance workshops year-round starting in the late 1950s. Over the years he presented workshops nationally and internationally at colleges, universities, civic, cultural, and governmental organizations.

He co-wrote Musical Instruments of Africa: Their Nature, Use and Place in the Life of a Deeply Musical People with Betty Warner-Dietz (John Day Company, 1965). He taught a summer drumming and African dance course with his wife, at the Omega Institute in Rhinebeck, New York for many summers during Family week. He also taught at the Esalen Institute in California beginning in 1985.

== Later life and death ==
Starting in the late 1980s Olatunji had a resurgent late career with the release of recordings on the Rykodisc label, Olatunji - Drums of Passion, The Invocation and Olatunji - Drums of Passion, The Beat. The 1990s brought further recordings with Babatunde Olatunji, Healing Session, (originally released as a limited edition cassette tape and later on CD in 2003), and Drums of Passion - Freedom, Justice and Peace.

The 1991 release on Rykodisc, Planet Drum, a collaboration with Mickey Hart of the Grateful Dead, along with multiple drummers, spent a record setting streak of weeks as the number 1 ranked recording on Billboard's Top World Music Album chart. Olatunji with the drumming ensemble supported the recording with a ten city national tour, playing sold out shows at such venues as Carnegie Hall. In 1994, a major box set compiling the complete Columbia Record recordings was issued by Bear Family Records. The 1997 recording, "Love Drum Talk", on the Chesky label, was nominated for a Grammy Award for Best World Beat Music.

Throughout the 1990s Olatunji's tour schedule more than doubled bringing Drums of Passion to events as far-flung as the International Peace University, Berlin, Kodo Drum Society of Japan, The National Cathedral of the United States of America, Ontario Anti-Racist Secretariat, Universita della Studi di Napoli, United Nations Hunger Project, along with an endless schedule of theater and club dates. During the 1990s Olatunji's educational workshops were presented by organizations associated with the human potential movement, such as Esalen Institute, Omega Institute, Hollyhock Farm, and organizations in Europe. In 1997, Olatunji was impresario for the Ghana Dance Ensemble, bringing the world famous performance and education group from Accra, Ghana, to tour the United States.

In early 2000, Olatunji purchased a home in Washington, D.C., where he lived for a short time, along with his roommate, Professor Akinsola Akiwowo. There he was assisted by Jaqui MacMillan and Chris Stewart, before he sold the house and moved to California. For the few years before his death Olatunji made his home at the wild Big Sur coastline. He became a scholar-in-residence at the Esalen Institute. During this time, he already suffered severely from diabetes and was assisted by Nora Arjuna, Leo Thompson, Jamie "Joriahna" Lee, and Leon Ryan until shortly before his death from diabetes in Salinas, California in 2003, one day before his 76th birthday. He was survived by his wife Amy, three children (Omotola Olatunji, Folasade Olatunji Olusekun, and Modupe Olatunji), 7 grandchildren, and a cousin, Akinsola Akiwowo.

== Awards ==
- Olatunji was part of Mickey Hart's Planet Drum projects, including the album Planet Drum, which won the Grammy Award for Best World Music Album of 1991, the first year for which the award was given.
- He was an inductee into the Percussive Arts Society Hall of Fame in 2001.

== Discography ==
=== Albums ===
- Drums of Passion (Columbia, 1959)
- Zungo! (Columbia, 1961)
- Flaming Drums (Columbia, 1962)
- High Life! (Columbia, 1963)
- Drums!, Drums!, Drums! (Roulette, 1964)
- More Drums of Passion (Columbia, 1966)
- Soul Makossa (Paramount, 1973)
- Dance to the Beat of My Drum (Blue Heron Records, 1986)
- Drums of Passion: The Invocation (Rykodisc, 1988)
- Drums of Passion: The Beat (Rykodisc, 1989)
- Drums of Passion: Celebrate Freedom, Justice & Peace (Olatunji, 1993)
- Drums of Passion and More (Bear Family, 1994)
- Babatunde Olatunji, Healing Rhythms, Songs and Chants (Olatunji, 1995)
- Love Drum Talk (1997, Chesky)
- Drums of Passion [Expanded] (2002)
- Olatunji Live at Starwood (2003) Recorded Live at the Starwood Festival 1997
- Healing Session (2003, Narada)
- Circle of Drums (2005, Chesky)

=== Videography ===
- Olatunji and His Drums of Passion (Video) (1986 Video Arts International) Recorded Live at Oakland Colisium 12/31/85
- Love Drum Talk (Video) (1998, CHE, TMS, Chesky)
- African Drumming (Instructional video) (1993, Interworld)
- Olatunji Live at Starwood (DVD) (2005, ACE) Recorded Live at the Starwood Festival 1997

=== As guest ===
With Mickey Hart

- At the Edge (Rykodisc, 1990)
- Planet Drum (Rykodisc, 1991)
- Mickey Hart's Mystery Box (Rykodisc, 1996)
- Supralingua (Rykodisc, 1998)
- Global Drum Project (Shout! Factory, 2007)
- Mysterium Tremendum (360°, 2012)

With others

- 1960 We Insist!, Max Roach
- 1960 Uhuru Afrika, Randy Weston
- 1960 The Incredible Kai Winding Trombones, Kai Winding
- 1961 African Waltz, Cannonball Adderley
- 1961 The Common Ground, Herbie Mann
- 1964 Gainsbourg Percussions, Serge Gainsbourg
- 1977 Home in the Country, Pee Wee Ellis
- 1977 Silver 'n Percussion, Horace Silver
- 1980 Connections, Richie Havens
- 1987 Taj, Taj Mahal
- 1988 The Other Side of This, Airto Moreira
- 1991 Jungle Fever, Stevie Wonder
- 1991 Strange and Beautiful, Crimson Glory
- 1995 Dance of the Rainbow Serpent, Carlos Santana
- 1997 Jazz 'Round Midnight, Quincy Jones
- 2000 The Rose That Grew from Concrete, 2Pac
- 2019 History, Youssou N’Dour

== See also ==
- Polyrhythm
