= Planet Drum =

Studio album by Mickey Hart
- Released: September 24, 1991
- Genre: World music
- Length: 50:01
- Label: Rykodisc
- Producer: Mickey Hart

Mickey Hart chronology
At the Edge (1990)	Planet Drum (1991)	Mickey Hart's Mystery Box (1996)

Professional ratings
Review scores
Source	Rating
Allmusic	2.5/5 stars

Planet Drum is a world music album by Mickey Hart, a musician and musicologist who was a member of the rock band the Grateful Dead.

Hart's concept for Planet Drum was to play drum music with percussionists from around the world, and incorporate their different musical styles and traditions into a new global sound. The musicians on the Planet Drum album were from the continental United States (Hart), Puerto Rico (Giovanni Hidalgo and Frank Colón), India (Zakir Hussain and T.H. "Vikku" Vinayakram), Nigeria (Sikiru Adepoju and Babatunde Olatunji), and Brazil (Airto Moreira and his wife, vocalist Flora Purim).

Planet Drum won the Grammy Award for Best World Music Album of 1991, the first year in which the award was given. It reached number 1 on the Billboard chart for Top World Music Albums. Mark Rowland of Musician wrote in 1996: "Starting with Rolling Thunder back in 1972, [Hart] produced dozens of albums by the likes of Babatunde Olatunji, the Gyuto Monks, and Zakir Hussain, along with his own adventurous projects, exploring the cross-cultural possibilities of world-beat percussion to increasing popular and critical acclaim, which culminated in a Grammy award for his Planet Drum in 1992."

== Planet Drum, the book ==
Hart also wrote a book called Planet Drum: A Celebration of Percussion and Rhythm, co-written by Fredric Lieberman and D.A. Sonneborn. The book explores the role of drumming in the musical, cultural, and spiritual traditions of different cultures. It was first published in 1991, the same year that the Planet Drum album was released, and has the same cover illustration by Nancy Nimoy.

== Planet Drum, the band ==
Since Planet Drum was released, Mickey Hart has sometimes toured with many of the same musicians who played on the album, performing live concerts. This ensemble is also called Planet Drum.

== Track listing ==
1. "Udu Chant" (Sikiru Adepoju, Mickey Hart, Zakir Hussain, Airto Moreira) – 3:40
2. "Island Groove" (Adepoju, Hart, Hussain, Moreira, Babatunde Olatunji) – 5:43
3. "Light Over Shadow" (Moreira, Olatunji, Flora Purim) – 3:51
4. "Dance of the Hunter's Fire" (Adepoju, Moreira, Olatunji, Colón, Purim, Hidalgo, T.H. "Vikku" Vinayakram) – 2:59
5. "Jewe (You are the One)" (Olatunji) – 4:06
6. "The Hunt" (Adepoju, Hart, Hussain, Moreira, Olatunji, Vinayakram) – 3:51
7. "Temple Caves" (Adepoju, Hart, Hussain, Moreira, Olatunji) – 3:13
8. "The Dancing Sorcerer" (Hussain, Moreira) – 2:57
9. "Bones" (Hart, Hussain, Olatunji, Purim) – 4:10
10. "Lost River" (Adepoju, Hart, Hussain, Moreira, Olatunji, Purim) – 2:58
11. "Evening Samba" (Adepoju, Hart, Hussain, Moreira, Olatunji, Vinayakram) – 4:30
12. "Iyanu (Surprises)" (Olatunji) – 2:02
13. "Mysterious Island" (Hart, Moreira, Purim, Jeff Sterling) – 5:49

== Personnel ==
=== Musicians ===
- Sikiru Adepoju
- Molonga Casquelord
- Frank Colón
- Mickey Hart
- Giovanni Hidalgo
- Zakir Hussain
- Bruce Langhorne
- Airto Moreira
- Caryl Ohrbach
- Babatunde Olatunji
- Flora Purim
- Gordy Ryan
- Jeff Sterling
- T.H. "Vikku" Vinayakram

=== Production ===
- Producer – Mickey Hart
- Co-producers – Sikiru Adepoju, Zakir Hussain, Airto Moreira, Babatunde Olatunji, Flora Purim, T.H. "Vikku" Vinayakram
- Recording and mixdown engineers – Tom Flye, Jeff Sterling
- Production manager – Howard Cohen
- Equipment managers – Ram Rod, Rudson Shurtliff
- Technical support – Jack Crymes
- Digital mastering – Paul Stubblebine
- Cover illustration – Nancy Nimoy
