= Mickey Hart =

American percussionist (born 1943)

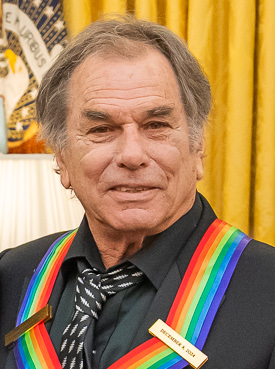
- Hart at the White House in December 2024

Background information
- Born: Michael Steven Hartman; September 11, 1943 (age 83); Brooklyn, New York, U.S.
- Genres: Rock; psychedelia; jam; folk; world
- Occupation: Musician
- Instruments: Drums, percussion
- Years active: 1960s–present
- Member of: Planet Drum: Dead & Company
- Formerly of: Grateful Dead: The Other Ones; The Dead; Rhythm Devils
- Website: mickeyhart.net

Signature
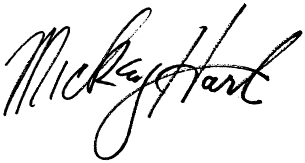

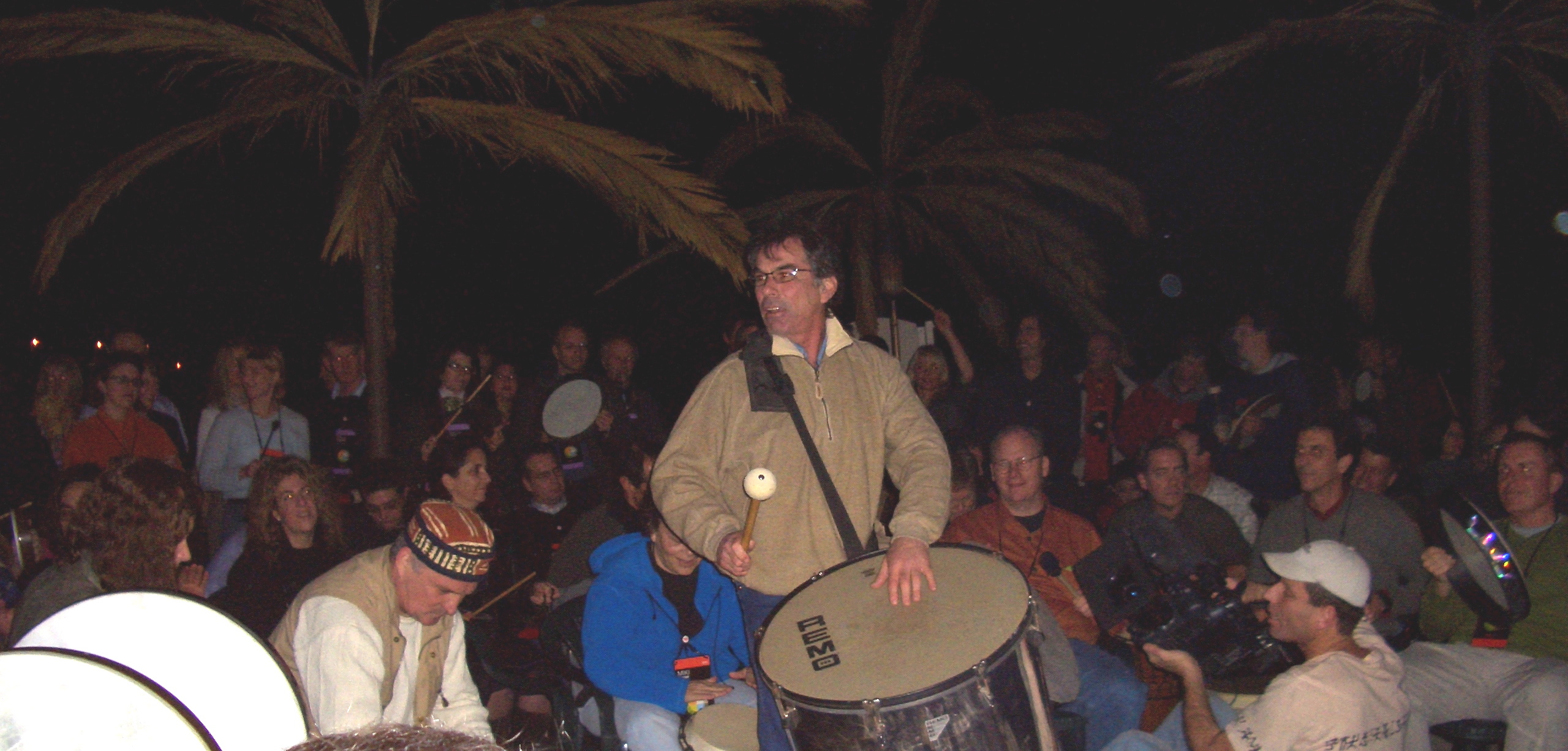
Mickey Hart leading a drum circle, February 2005

Mickey Hart (born Michael Steven Hartman, September 11, 1943) is an American percussionist. He is best known as one of the two drummers of the rock band Grateful Dead. He was a member of the Grateful Dead from September 1967 until February 1971, and again from October 1974 until their final show in July 1995. He and fellow Dead drummer Bill Kreutzmann earned the nickname "the rhythm devils".

== Early life and education ==
Michael Steven Hartman was born in the Flatbush section of Brooklyn, New York. He was raised in the nearby suburban community of Inwood, New York, by his mother, Leah, a drummer, gown maker and bookkeeper. His father Lenny Hart, a champion rudimental drummer, had abandoned his family when the younger Hart was a toddler. Although Hart (who was hyperactive and not academically inclined) became interested in percussion as a grade school student, his interest intensified after seeing his father's picture in a newsreel documenting the 1939 World's Fair. Shortly thereafter, he discovered a practice pad and a pair of snakewood sticks that belonged to his father. "From the age of ten," he recalled, "all I did was drum."

He attended Lawrence High School in Cedarhurst, New York. Hart would later recall that many champion rudimental drummers attended his high school; this inspired him to ascend to the first chair in the All State Band as a pupil of Arthur Jones, who served as a father figure to him and ensured that he was not suspended for neglecting his other classes.

While employed as a soda jerk at El Patio, a beach club in Atlantic Beach, New York, he was influenced by Tito Puente's regular appearances. A few months out of high school, he discovered the work of Nigerian drummer Babatunde Olatunji, another formative influence. Olatunji later taught and collaborated with Hart.

Hart dropped out of high school as a senior. Impressed by its musical pedigree, he enlisted in the United States Air Force in 1961. He served as a drummer in The Airmen of Note, an elite big band unit in the United States Air Force Band modeled after Glenn Miller's celebrated Army Air Forces Band.

For three and a half years he was stationed throughout Europe, where he also claimed to have taught "combative measures" (most notably judo, in which he had attained a black belt) to units of the Strategic Air Command and other units in Europe and Africa. During a tour in Spain, he reportedly sat in with a variety of notable jazz musicians (including Gerry Mulligan and Count Basie) in addition to performing in various ensembles (spanning the gamut from small jazz combos to marching bands) and on recording sessions for local pop stars. Hart would later intimate in a 1972 interview that his Airmen of Note assignment served as a "cover" for his instructive duties. While in the Air Force, he co-founded Joe and the Jaguars (alternatively billed as The Jaguars) with a fellow serviceman, guitarist Joe Bennett. Following his 1965 discharge, Hart briefly returned to the New York metropolitan area, where he filled in for the regular drummer in a "staid fox-trot band" as a member of the local musician's union.

While stationed in southern California, he had discovered that his father (by then employed as a savings and loan association executive in Los Angeles) was still involved in the drumming community as an endorser for Remo. Founder Remo Belli facilitated an introduction before Hart was reassigned to Spain, but the elder Hart soon disappeared. A post-discharge reconciliation attempt (also mediated by Belli) proved to be more successful. Shortly thereafter, father and son established the Hart Music Center in San Carlos, California. In late 1965 or early 1966, Hart performed in an early iteration of William Penn and His Pals prior to Gregg Rolie's membership and the recording of the garage rock classic "Swami." Later in 1966, Hart and Bennett briefly resumed their collaboration before the latter reenlisted for a tour of duty in Vietnam.

By the end of the year, Hart had moved in with Michael Hinton, a student and friend who would accompany him to a Count Basie Orchestra performance at The Fillmore in mid-1967. At the concert, Hart helped fulfill Grateful Dead drummer Bill Kreutzmann's request to meet Basie Orchestra drummer Sonny Payne, leading to an informal tutorial between Hart and Kreutzmann and his eventual introduction to the Grateful Dead.

== Career ==
Hart joined the Grateful Dead in September 1967. His interests in polyrhythmic rudiments and exotic percussion were integral to the band's arrangements in the period that archivist Dick Latvala subsequently characterized as the "primal Dead era" of 1968–1969. However, he left by mutual agreement in February 1971, extricating himself after his father (who briefly managed the group) embezzled $70,000 from the band. In his 2015 memoir, Kreutzmann divulged that Hart's use of heroin and other "dark drugs" had accelerated in the wake of the embezzlement and impacted his contributions to the group, also contributing to his departure: "Mickey wasn't able to play at the level he was capable of and it was beginning to affect our performances. He was getting really spacey and just getting so far out there that he wasn't able to deliver the music. It became impossible for me to play with him. It wasn't out of anger or meanness, but we had to address it and deal with it. So our brother Mickey left the band and retreated to his ranch in Novato and it really strained our relationship for a while, sad to say."

During his sabbatical, he released the album Rolling Thunder in 1972. Two additional solo albums (including an ambient music project that was envisaged as the soundtrack for The Silent Flute, a screenplay co-written by Bruce Lee, James Coburn and Stirling Silliphant that was ultimately filmed in 1978 as the David Carradine vehicle Circle of Iron) were completed but rejected by Warner Brothers due to the label's increasingly strained relationship with the Grateful Dead. Hart's home recording studio proved to be a haven for the more idiosyncratic endeavors pursued by various band members, and he continued to collaborate with his former bandmates on various projects, most notably Robert Hunter's Tales of the Great Rum Runners (1974) and Ned Lagin's Seastones (1975).

He returned to the Dead for their final pre-hiatus concert in October 1974 and was formally reinstated by the beginning of the group's 1976 tour. He remained with the group until their official dissolution in 1995. Hart's collaboration with the remaining members of the Grateful Dead has continued with The Other Ones, The Dead and Dead & Company.

Alongside his work with the Grateful Dead, Hart has performed as a solo artist, percussionist, and the author of several books. In these endeavors he has pursued a lifelong interest in ethnomusicology and world music.

Hart was influential in recording global musical traditions on the verge of possible extinction, working with archivists and ethnomusicologists at both the American Folklife Center at the Library of Congress and the Center for Folklife and Cultural Heritage at the Smithsonian Institution. He is on the Board of Trustees of the American Folklife Center and has been a spokesperson for the "Save Our Sounds" audio preservation initiative. He also serves on the Library of Congress National Recorded Sound Preservation Board and is known for reissues and other recordings with historical and cultural value.

In 1991, Hart produced the album Planet Drum, which remained at number one on the Billboard World Music chart for 26 weeks, and received the first ever Grammy Award for Best World Music Album.

Hart has written books on the history and traditions of drumming throughout history. His solo recordings (featuring a variety of guest musicians) are percussive but verge on New Age.

Mickey Hart was inducted into The Percussive Arts Society Hall Of Fame in 2009, a very rare honour.

In 1994, Hart was inducted into the Rock and Roll Hall of Fame as a member of the Grateful Dead.

In 2000, Hart became a member of the board of directors of the Institute for Music and Neurologic Function, a nonprofit organization that studies the healing power of music – continuing his investigation into the connection between healing and rhythm, and the neural basis of rhythm. In 2003, he was honored with the organization's Music Has Power Award, recognizing his advocacy and continuous commitment to raising public awareness of the positive effect of music.

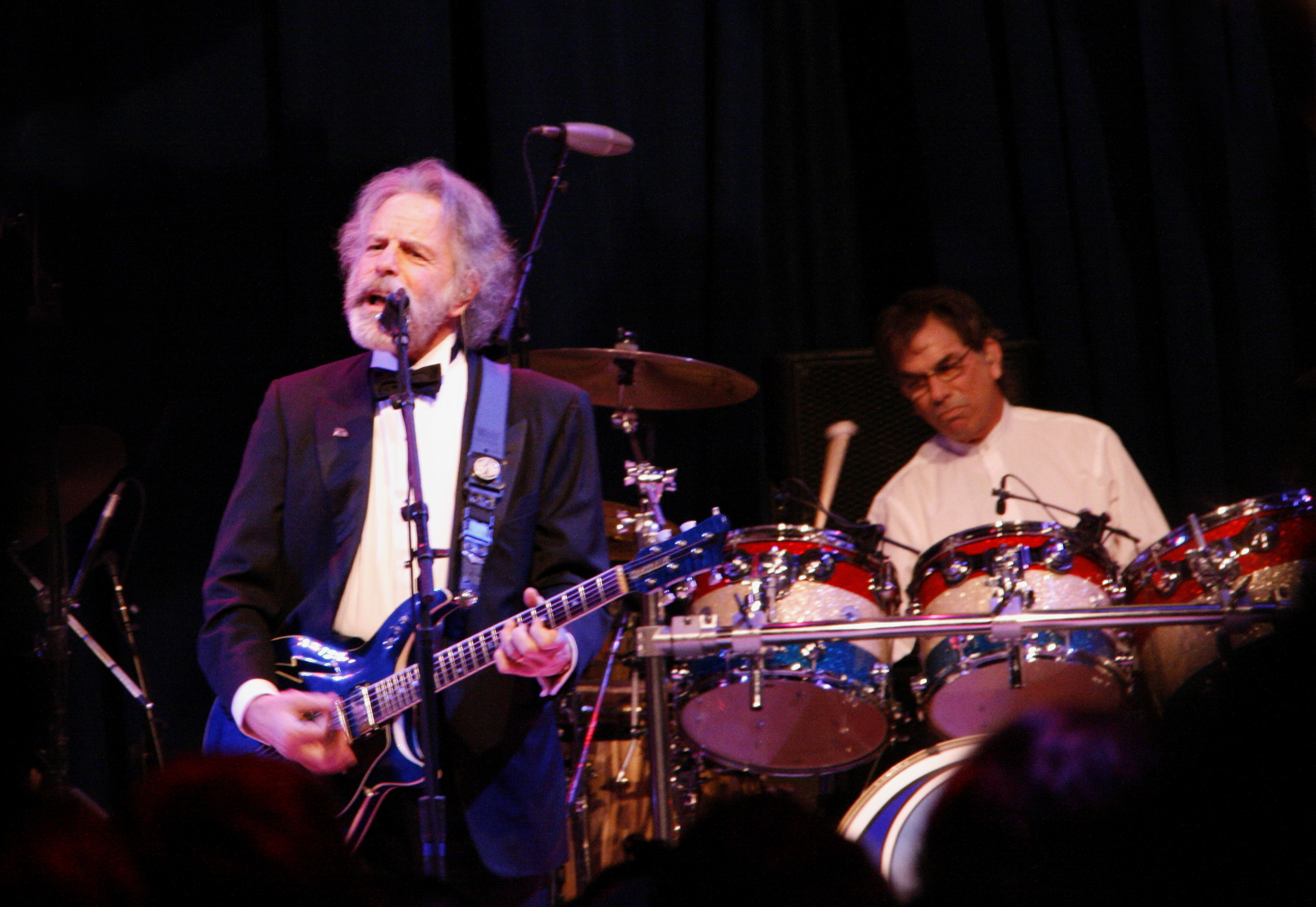
Mickey Hart (in background, playing drums) and Bob Weir (playing guitar) performing at the Mid-Atlantic Inaugural Ball during the presidential inauguration of Barack Obama, January 20, 2009

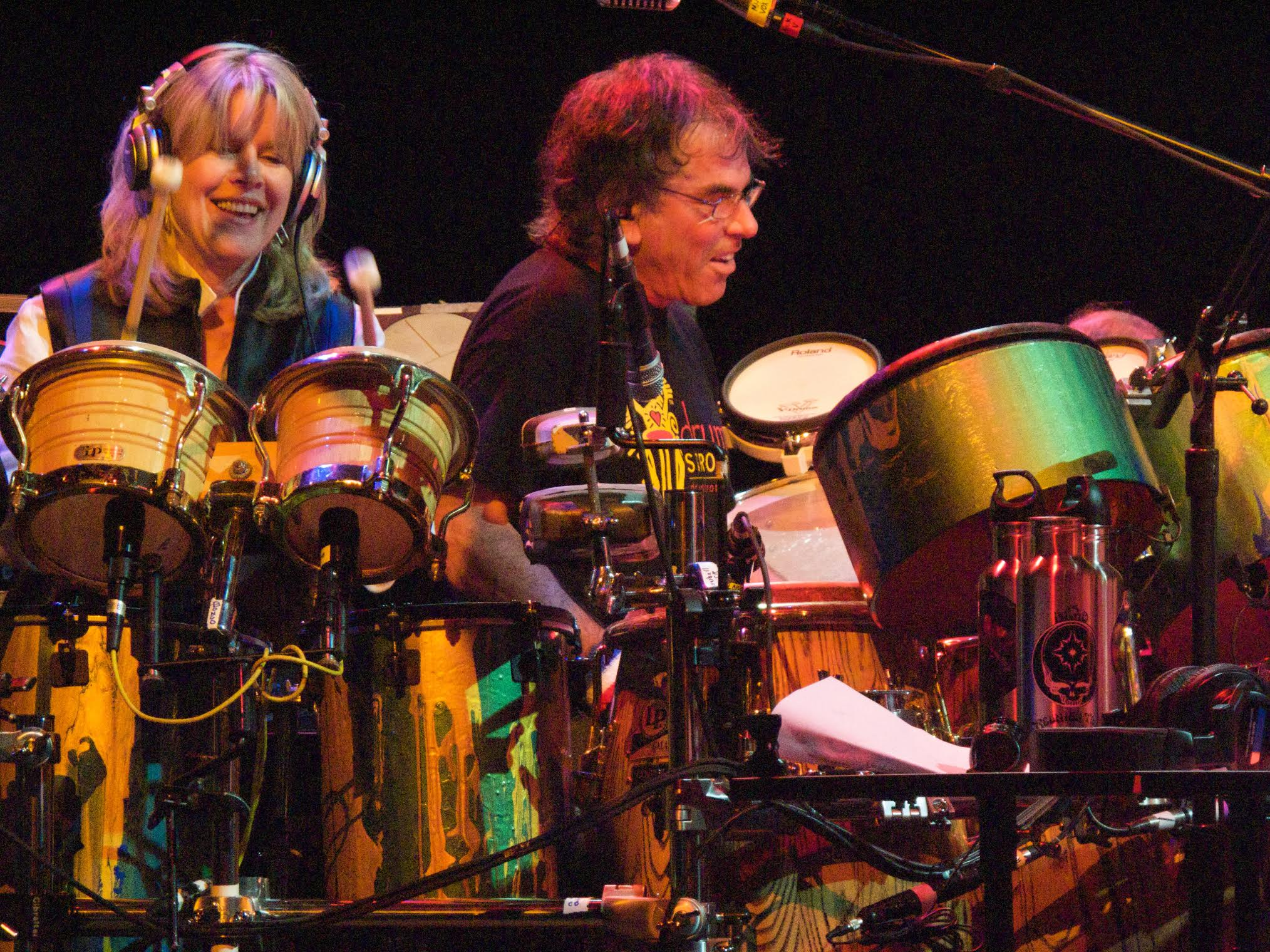
Tipper Gore and Mickey Hart playing drums together during a The Dead concert in April 2009

Hart was also a judge for the 3rd annual Independent Music Awards to support independent artists' careers.

After the death of Jerry Garcia and the consequent dissolution of the Grateful Dead in 1995, Hart continued to play music with various groups including members of the Grateful Dead. In the 1996 Furthur Festival, Mickey Hart's Mystery Box played, as did Bob Weir's band, Ratdog.

In 2005, Hart and the members of the band Particle joined to create the Hydra Project.

During 2006, Hart teamed up with fellow Grateful Dead bandmate Bill Kreutzmann, Phish bassist Mike Gordon and former Other Ones lead guitarist Steve Kimock, to form the Rhythm Devils, a nickname that refers to Hart and Kreutzmann's drum duets and improvisation. The band features songs from their respective repertoires as well as new songs written by Jerry Garcia's songwriting companion Robert Hunter. The Rhythm Devils announced their first tour in 2006, which ended at the popular Vegoose festival in Las Vegas, Nevada over the Halloween weekend.

In June and July 2008, Hart led the Mickey Hart Band on a US concert tour. The band consists of Hart, Steve Kimock on guitar and pedal steel guitar, George Porter Jr. on bass, Kyle Hollingsworth on keyboards, Sikiru Adepoju on talking drum, Walfredo Reyes, Jr. on drums, and Jen Durkin on vocals.

In 2010 Hart debuted "Rhythms of the Universe," a composition based on a variety of astrophysical data. The composition represents a collaboration between scientist and artist, using their own sophisticated tools. Nobel Laureate in physics George Smoot from the University of California, Berkeley, and Lawrence Berkeley National Laboratory (LBNL), and Keith Jackson, a computer scientist and musician also from LBNL, provided some of the data for the project. The final result comprises a "musical history of the universe", from the Big Bang onwards through galaxy and star formation, up until modern times, including images from the Hubble Space Telescope and rhythms derived from the cosmic microwave background radiation, supernovae, quasars, and many other astrophysical phenomena. The work premiered at the conference "Cosmology on the Beach" in Playa del Carmen in January 2010.

In April 2010, it was announced that Rhythm Devils would tour in the summer of 2010 with a new line-up including Hart and Bill Kreutzmann (assorted percussion), Keller Williams (guitar, vocals), Sikiru Adepoju (talking drum), Davy Knowles (guitar, vocals), and Andy Hess (bass).

The Rhythm Devils did only one show in 2011, at the Gathering of the Vibes Music Festival in Bridgeport, Connecticut. This version of the band was Hart, Kreutzmann, Keller Williams, Sikiru, Steve Kimock and Reed Mathis of Tea Leaf Green on bass.

In 2011 Hart debuted a new version of the Mickey Hart Band. This lineup included Tim Hockenberry (vocals, keyboards, trombone, saxophone, other instruments), Crystal Monee Hall (vocals, guitar, hand percussion), Ben Yonas (keyboards), Gawain Mathews (guitar), Sikiru Adepoju (talking drum, djembe, shakers), Ian "Inkx" Herman (drums), Greg Ellis (percussion), Vir McCoy (bass). The band played a few shows in August 2011 on the east and west coasts of the United States. In November and December 2011, the Mickey Hart Band did a 17-date tour with a slightly modified lineup. McCoy and Ellis were not in this lineup, and Widespread Panic band member Dave Schools joined the band as their bass player for the tour.

On October 11, 2011, Smithsonian Folkways released The Mickey Hart Collection. Comprising 25 albums, the series includes music from regions that span the globe, including the Sudan, Nigeria, Tibet, Indonesia, Latvia, and Brazil.

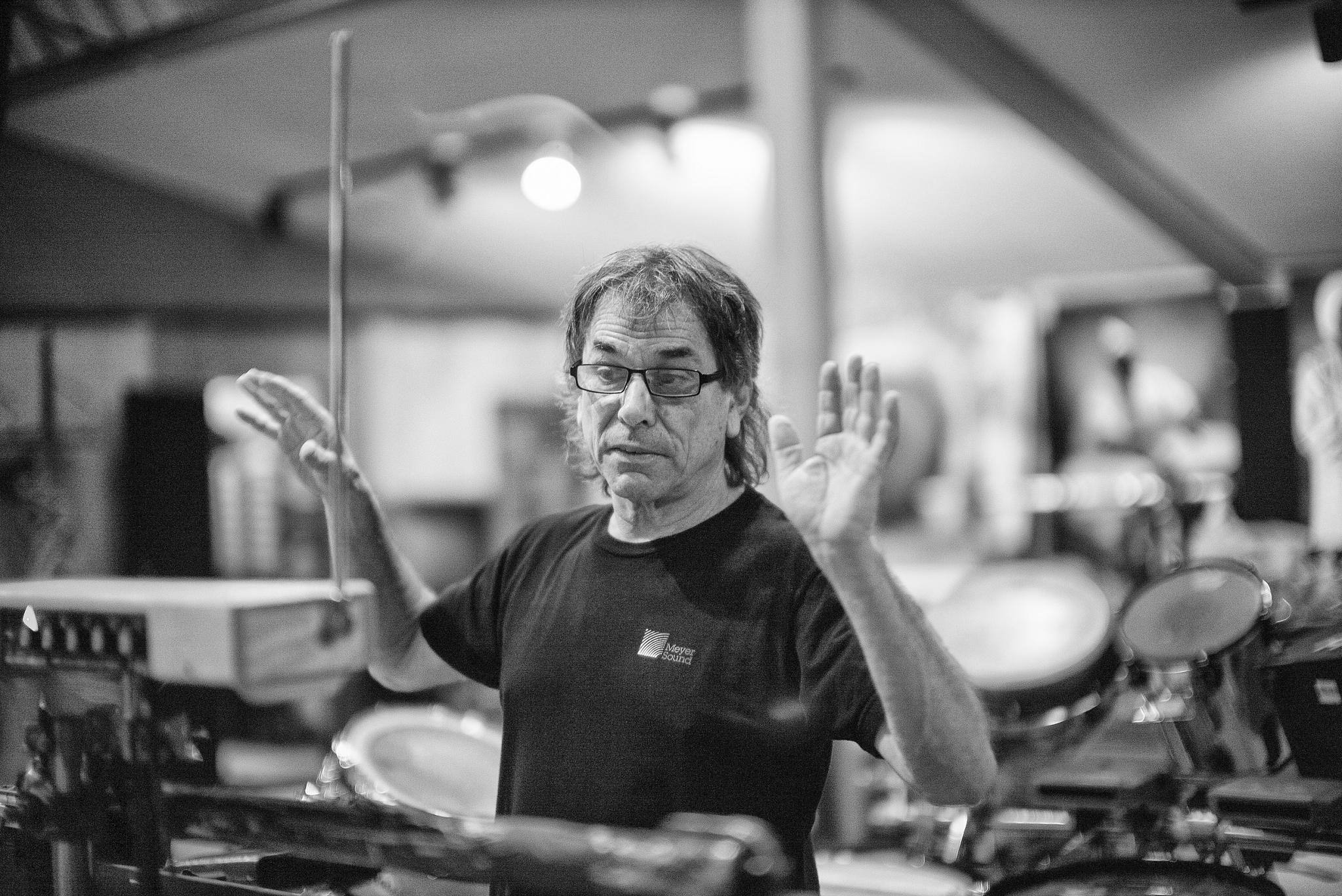
Mickey Hart in 2013

In August 2013, the Mickey Hart Band embarked upon a tour with the Tea Leaf Trio, which includes three members of the band Tea Leaf Green, in support of the band's album Superorganism.

On September 29, 2013, the completed version of his and George Smoot's film Rhythms of the Universe premiered at the Smithsonian Air and Space Museum in Washington, D.C.

In the summer of 2015, the surviving members of the Grateful Dead (Bob Weir, Phil Lesh, Bill Kreutzmann and Mickey Hart), joined by Trey Anastasio, Bruce Hornsby and Jeff Chimenti, performed a series of concerts to celebrate the 50th anniversary of the Grateful Dead. The performances took place at Santa Clara's Levi Stadium on June 27 and 28, 2015 and Chicago's Soldier Field on July 3, 4 and 5, 2015. These performances marked the first time Weir, Lesh, Kreutzmann and Hart performed together since the Dead's 2009 tour and was publicized as the final time the musicians will all perform together.

Also in 2015, Hart began touring with Dead & Company, a band consisting of former Grateful Dead members Weir, Hart and Kreutzmann, along with John Mayer (guitar), Oteil Burbridge (bass), and Jeff Chimenti (keyboards). The band began touring in late 2015 and have conducted multiple tours since then. In 2017, he released RAMU, which featured contributions from both his long-time collaborators Steve Kimock and Sikiru Adepoju as well as Avey Tare and Tank Ball, among others.

== Personal life ==
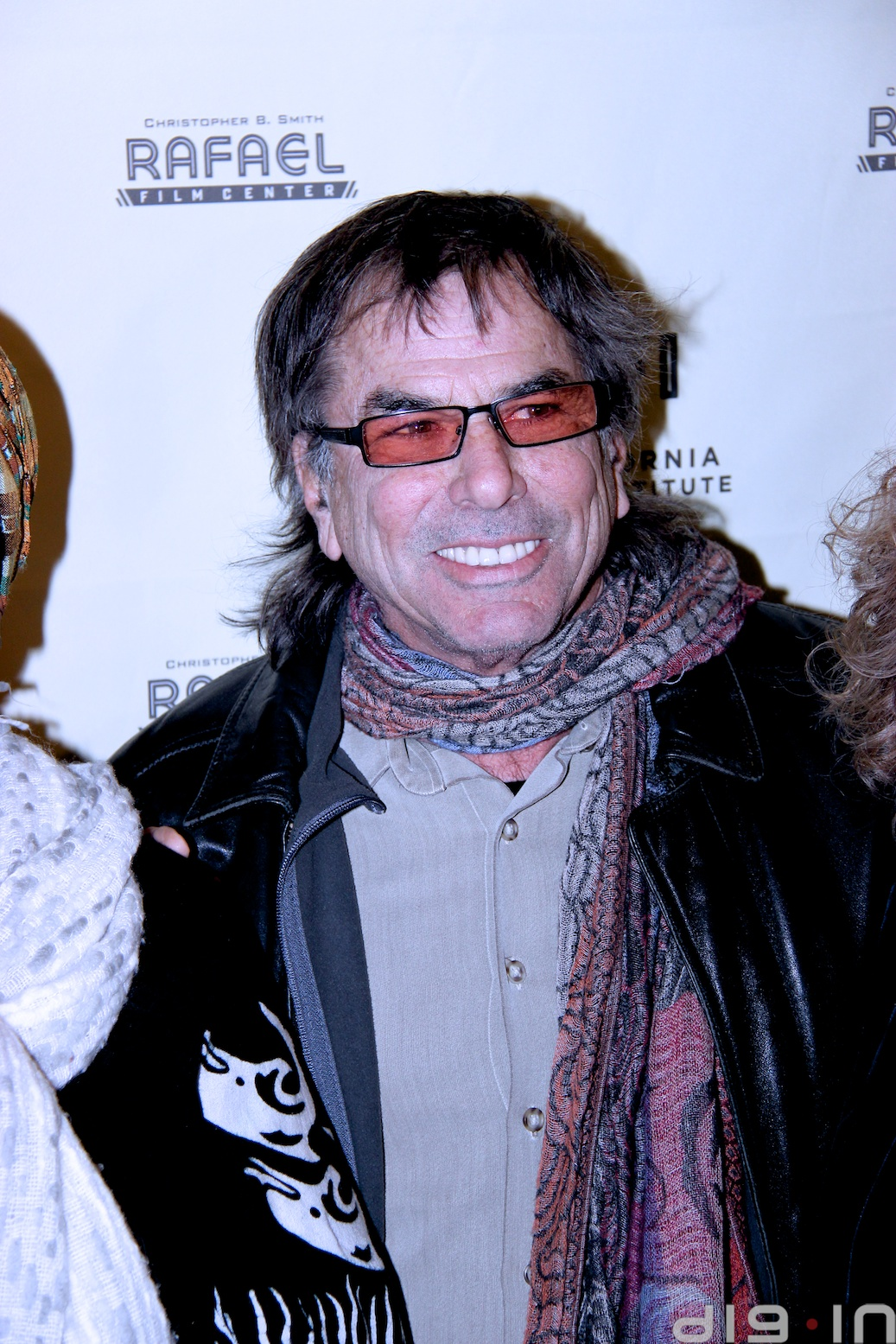
Mickey Hart, January 2013

Hart has been married since 1990 to lawyer, environmental activist and former Sonoma County (California) Regional Parks Director Caryl Ohrbach Hart, with whom he has a daughter Reya. Hart also has a son Taro (born January 13, 1983) from his previous marriage to Mary Holloway. He had Taro's heartbeat recorded in utero and used as the basis for the album Music to Be Born By. He lives in Occidental, California. Hart is the only Jewish member of the Grateful Dead.

== Works ==
=== Audiobooks ===
- Aladdin and the Magic Lamp. Rabbit Ears Entertainment LLC. 1994.

=== Books ===
- Drumming at the Edge of Magic: A Journey into the Spirit of Percussion. San Francisco: Harper. 1990. ISBN 978-0062503725.
- Planet Drum: A Celebration of Percussion and Rhythm. Harper Collins. 1991. ISBN 978-0062504142.
- Spirit into Sound: The Magic of Music. Grateful Dead Books. 1999. ISBN 978-1888358230.
- Songcatchers: In Search of the World's Music. National Geographic. 2003. ISBN 079224107X.

=== Albums ===
- Rolling Thunder (1972) – Mickey Hart
- Diga (1976) – Diga Rhythm Band
- The Apocalypse Now Sessions: The Rhythm Devils Play River Music (1980) – Rhythm Devils
- Däfos (1983) – Mickey Hart, Airto Moreira, Flora Purim
- Yamantaka (1983) – Mickey Hart, Henry Wolff, Nancy Hennings
- Music to Be Born By (1989) – Mickey Hart
- At the Edge (1990) – Mickey Hart
- Planet Drum (1991) – Mickey Hart
- Mickey Hart's Mystery Box (1996) – Mickey Hart
- Supralingua (1998) – Mickey Hart
- Spirit into Sound (2000) – Mickey Hart
- The Best of Mickey Hart: Over the Edge and Back (2002) – Mickey Hart
- Global Drum Project (2007) – Mickey Hart, Zakir Hussain, Sikiru Adepoju, Giovanni Hidalgo
- Mysterium Tremendum (2012) – Mickey Hart Band
- Superorganism (2013) – Mickey Hart Band
- RAMU (2017) – Mickey Hart
- In the Groove (2022) – Planet Drum

=== Video ===
- The Rhythm Devils Concert Experience (2008) – Rhythm Devils

== Filmography ==
Year	Title	Role	Notes	Ref
2012	The Other Dream Team	Himself	Documentary about the Lithuania men's national basketball team at the 1992 Summer Olympics.	

== See also ==
- List of celebrities who own cannabis businesses
