= Music of Tibet =

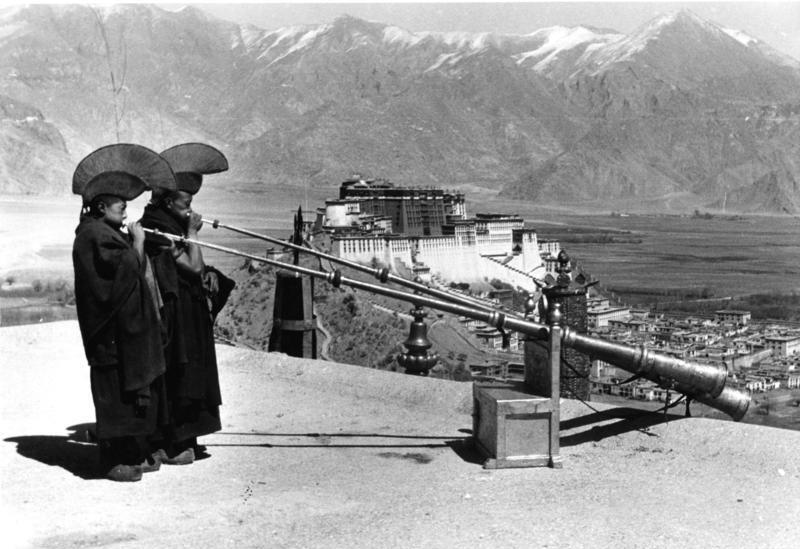
Monks playing dungchen, Tibetan long trumpets, from the roof of the Medical College, Lhasa, 1938

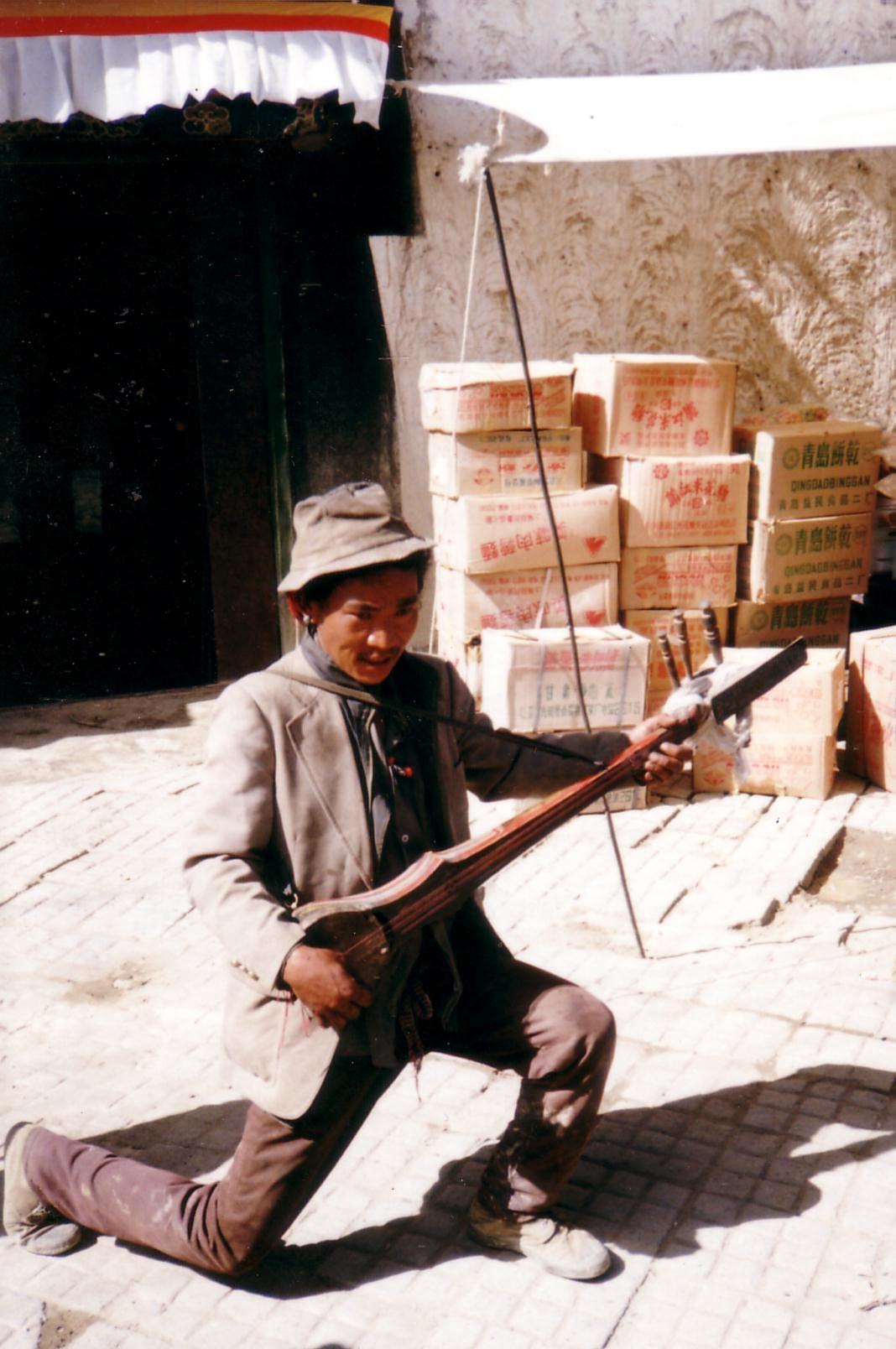
Street musician playing a dramyin, Shigatse, Tibet, 1993

The music of Tibet reflects the cultural heritage of the trans-Himalayan region centered in Tibet, but also known wherever Indigenous Tibetan groups are found in Nepal, Bhutan, India and further abroad. The religious music of Tibet reflects the profound influence of Tibetan Buddhism on the culture.

The new-age 'singing bowl' music marketed in the West as 'Tibetan music' is of 1970s US origin.

== History ==
Western research into the history of Tibetan music has often focused more on religious than secular musics. It has been suggested that Tibetan religious music may have been strongly influenced by West-Asian musics, including those of pre-Muslim Persia (and perhaps even of Byzantium). It has also been suggested that the landscape – and in particular the resonances of caves, with their natural percussive sounding stones - exerted a formative influence on the overtone singing found in Tibetan Buddhist chant (and plausibly also in prehistoric shamanic invocations), which is produced by artful moulding of the oral cavity. The assiduous adoption and evolution of Indian Buddhist traditions and culture in Tibet between the 12th and mid-20th centuries – in a period when Buddhism had disappeared from most of the Indian subcontinent - allowed the Tibetans to perpetuate musical practices from India that would otherwise have been lost, and to develop them in distinctive ways. Although Tibetan religious music can appear quite separate from the major traditions that emerged in Indian music, some of the musical instruments actually descend from Indian monastic and tantric Buddhist contexts, including, for example, the dril-bu hand-bell, the characteristic hour-glass drums called damaru, and the thighbone trumpet (kangling), as used in the practice of chöd.

The Lama Mani tradition — the telling of Buddhist parables through song — dates back to the 12th century. The songs were performed by wandering storytellers, who travelled from village to village, drawing on their own often humble origins to relate to people from all backgrounds. Vividly illustrated Buddhist thangka paintings depicted the narrative and helped the audience understand what was essentially a teaching.

Tibetan "street songs" were a traditional form of expression particularly popular as a means of political and other commentary in a country that was previously without newspapers or other means of mass communication. They provided political and social commentary and satire and are a good example of a bardic tradition, akin to that in medieval Europe or, more recently, the role calypsos played in the West Indies. As song lyrics in Tibet usually contained stanzas of 4 lines of 6 syllables each, the lyrics could be easily adapted to almost any melody.

Secular Tibetan music has been promoted by organizations like the Dalai Lama's Tibetan Institute of Performing Arts. This organization specialized in the lhamo, an operatic style, before branching out into other styles, including dance music like toeshey and nangma. Nangma is especially popular in the karaoke bars of the urban center of Tibet, Lhasa. Another form of popular music is the classical gar style, which is performed at rituals and ceremonies. Lu are a type of traditional a cappella folk songs that feature glottal vibrations and high pitches. There are also epic bards who sing of Tibet's national hero Gesar.

== Musical instruments ==
=== Wind ===
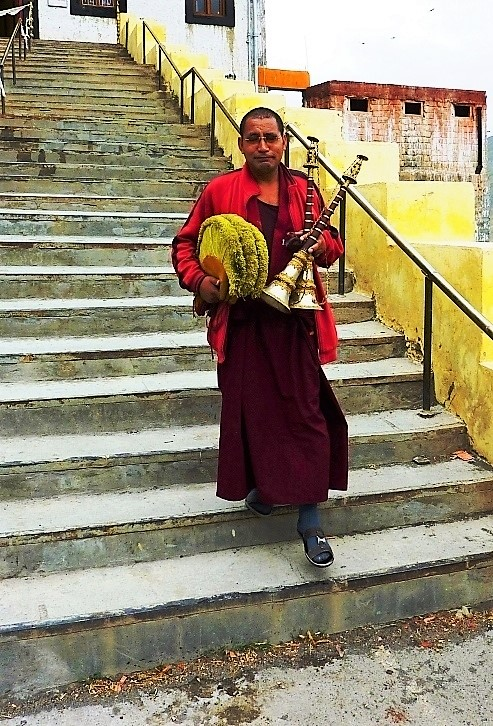
Monk with Gyaling and hats. Key Monastery Spiti, Himachal Pradesh, India

- Dungchen (དུང་ཆེན་, literally "big conch") or rag-dung (རག་དུང་, literally "brass horn") - long horn made of copper and/or brass
- Dung-kar or dung-dkar (དུང་དཀར་, literally "white conch") - conch shell horn
- Gyaling (རྒྱ་གླིང་) - shawm
- Kangling (རྐང་གླིང་) or kang-dung (རྐང་དུང་) - trumpet made from a human leg bone, or sometimes wood
- Lingbu (གླིང་བུ་) - flute made from bamboo, or occasionally wood
  - Dung-rus gling-bu - flute made from the leg bone of an eagle or vulture
- Kha-wang or gugzi - Jew's harp

=== String ===
- Dramyin or sgra-snyan (སྒྲ་སྙན་) - long-necked fretless plucked lute with 6 or 7 strings
- Piwang (པི་ཝང་) - 2-stringed vertical fiddle
- Rgyud-mang (རྒྱུད་མང, literally "many strings") - hammered dulcimer

=== Percussion ===
- Chö nga or lak nga - double-headed drum, which is usually held by a handle in the left hand and struck with a curved stick held in the right hand
- Damaru (ཌ་མ་རུ་) - small hourglass drum
- Dhyangro - drum used by Himalayan shamans
- Dril-bu (དྲིལ་བུ་) - handbell
- Gyer-kha (གཡེར་ཁ་) - small decorative bell
- Khar-nga (མཁར་རྔ་) - gong
- Nga or rnga (རྔ་) - term referring to any drum or ritual percussion instrument
  - Nga chen or rnga-chen (རྔ་ཆེན་) - large double-headed drum, suspended in a frame and played with two sticks
  - Rnga-chung - small double-headed drum
- Lda man (ལྡ་མན་) - a pair of kettledrums
- Rölmo (རོལ་མོ་), also called buk chöl, bup chal, or sbub-chal - hemispherical cymbals
- Silnyen or sil-snyan (སིལ་སྙན་ or སིལ་སྙེན་) - flat cymbals
- Tingsha or ting-shags (ཏིང་ཤགས་) - small cymbals
- Mkhar-rnga bcu-pa - set of 10 tuned gongs in a frame

== Popular and modern ==
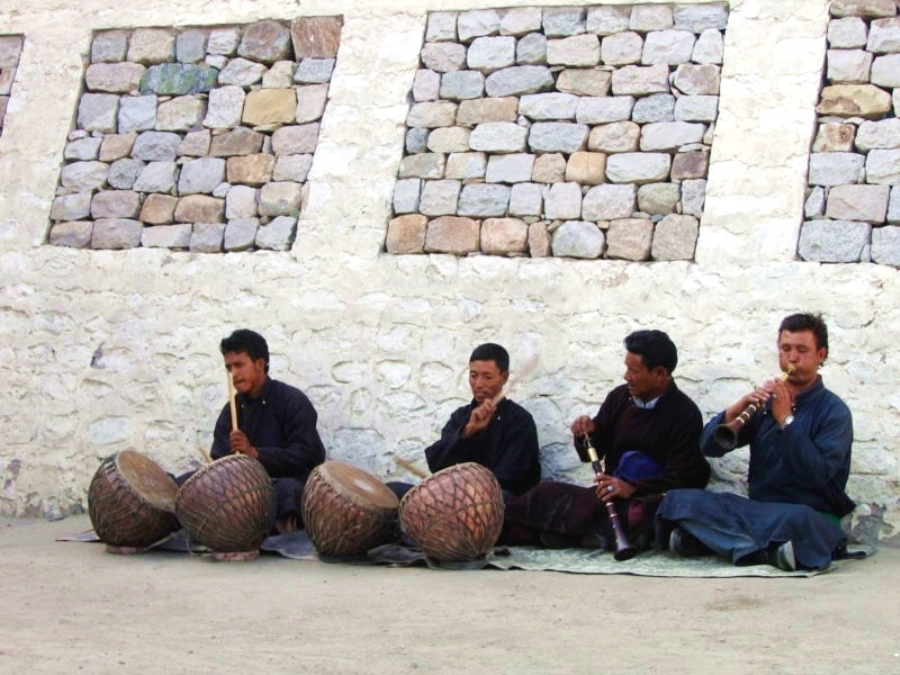
Street musicians. Lhasa. 1993

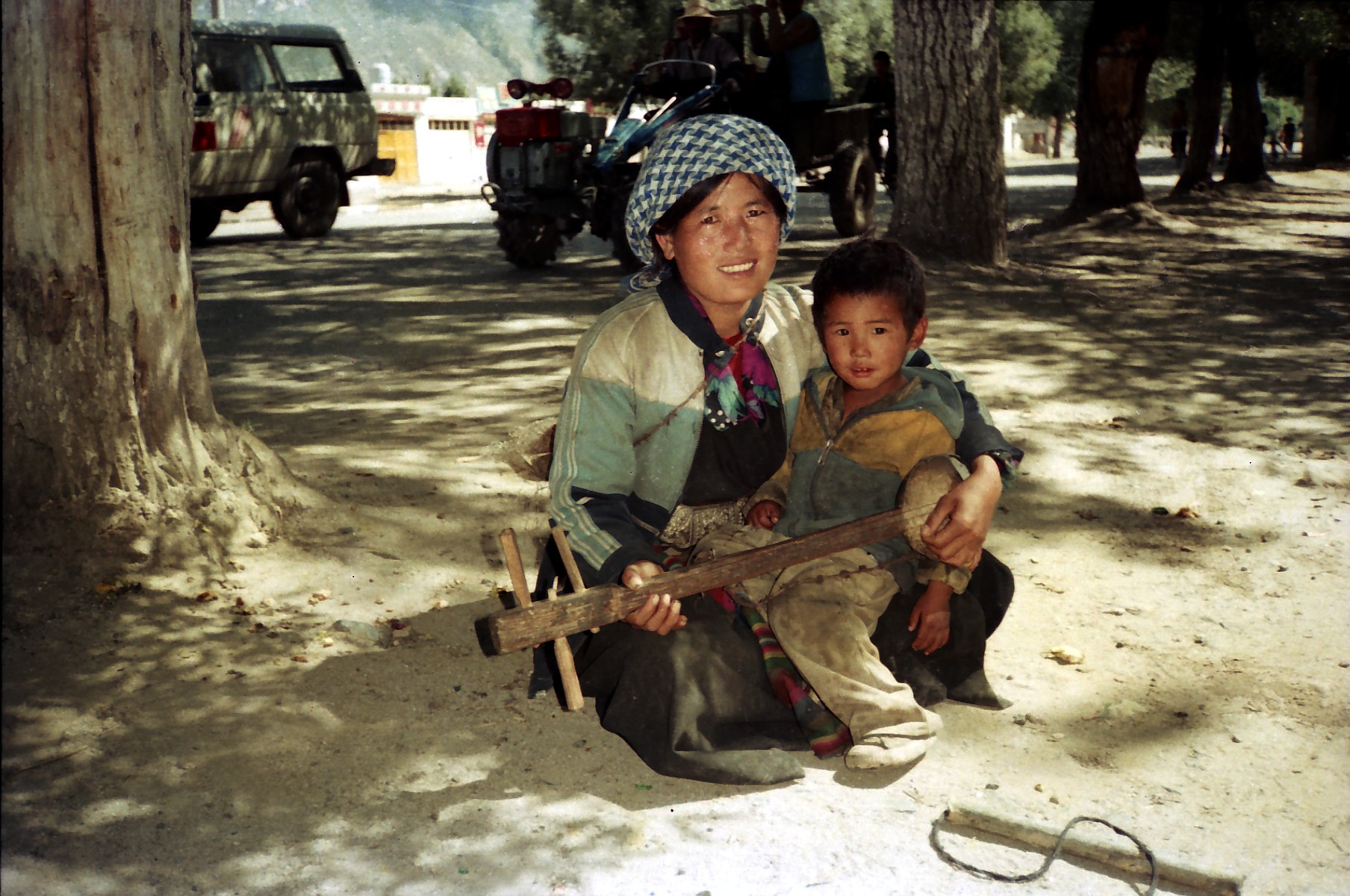
Mother & son playing lute. Lhasa 1993

Tibetans have a very strong popular-music culture, and are also well represented in Chinese popular culture. Tibetan singers are particularly known for their strong vocal abilities, which many attribute to the high altitudes of the Tibetan Plateau. Tseten Dolma (才旦卓玛) rose to fame in the 1960s for her music-and-dance suite "The East is Red". Kelsang Metok (格桑梅朵) is a popular singer who combines the vocal traditions of Tibet with elements of Chinese, Indian and Western pop. Purba Rgyal (Pubajia or 蒲巴甲) was the 2006 winner of Jiayou! Haona'r (Chinese: 加油！好男儿), a Chinese reality talent show. In 2006, he starred in Sherwood Hu's Prince of the Himalayas, an adaptation of Shakespeare's Hamlet, set in ancient Tibet and featuring an all-Tibetan cast.

In the multi-ethnic provinces of Qinghai and Sichuan, whose Tibetan inhabitants are regarded as part of the "Amdo" cultural tradition, there is a very strong local scene, mostly exposed through videos on local buses. Amdo stars are among others Sherten (short for Sherab Tendzin) and Yadong, who both have reached outside the borders of China with their music.

The first fusion with Western music was Tibetan Bells, a 1972 release by Nancy Hennings and Henry Wolff. The soundtrack to Kundun, by Philip Glass, has helped to popularize Tibetan music.

Foreign styles of popular music have also had a major impact within the Tibetan diaspora, where Indian ghazal and filmi are very popular and American rock has produced the India-based Rangzen Shonu. Within Tibet itself, among rock groups the bilingual Vajara (天杵; Tiān Chǔ) sextants are the oldest and most famous act. Since the relaxation of some laws in the 1980s, Tibetan pop, popularised by the likes of Yadong (Tibet), Dadon (now living in the US), Jampa Tsering (Tibet), 3-member group AJIA, 4-member group Gao Yuan Hong, five-member group Gao Yuan Feng, are well known. Gaoyuan Hong in particular has introduced elements of Tibetan language rapping into their singles. Alan Dawa Dolma is the first and currently only artist of Tibetan ethnicity to be active in both Chinese and Japanese music industry.

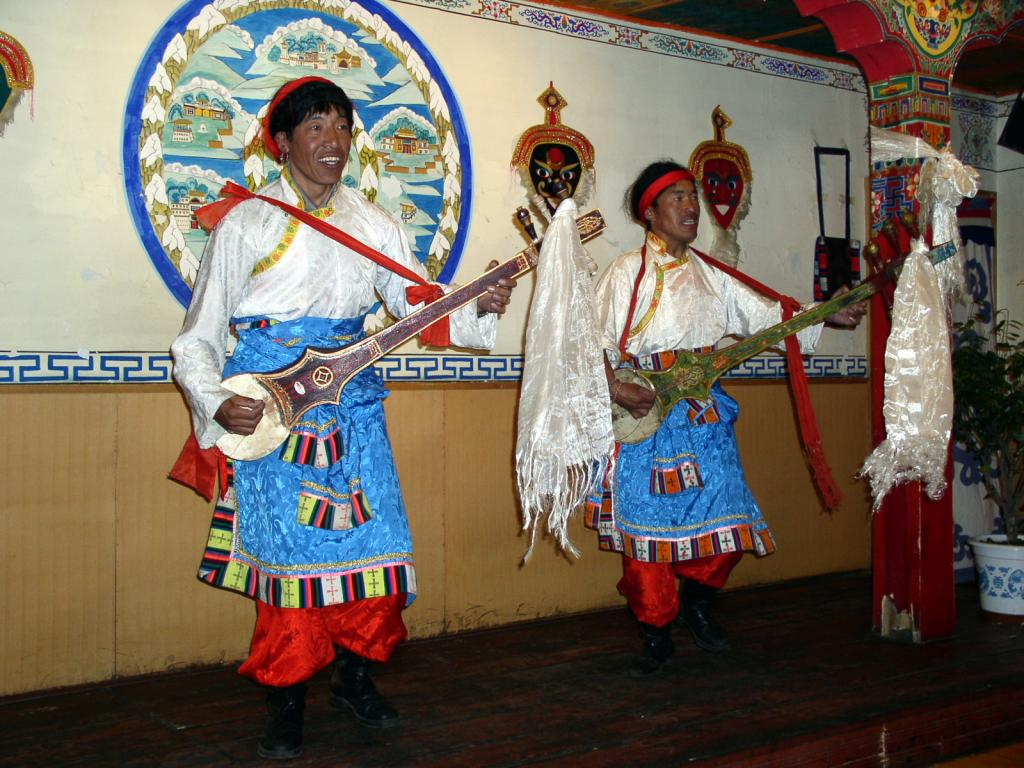
Tibetan dancing

== Western representations ==
Although it is sometimes stated that 'Tibetan singing bowls' date back to a pre-Buddhist, shamanic Bon-Po tradition, the manufacture and use of bowls specifically for the purpose of 'singing' (as opposed to standing bells/bowls that are intended to be struck) is believed to be a modern and non-Tibetan phenomenon. The historical records and accounts of the music of Tibet are silent about singing bowls. Such bowls are not mentioned by Perceval Landon (a visitor in 1903–1904) in his notes on Tibetan music, nor by any other visitor.

Wolff and Hennings' seminal recording Tibetan Bells was followed by the development of a unique style of American singing bowl music often marketed as 'Tibetan music'. This has remained very popular in the US with many recordings being marketed as World music or New-age music since the introduction of those terms in the 1980s. 'Tibetan singing bowls' have as a result become a prominent visual and musical symbol of Tibet, to the extent that the most prevalent modern representation of Tibet within the US is that of bowls played by Americans.

== Gallery ==
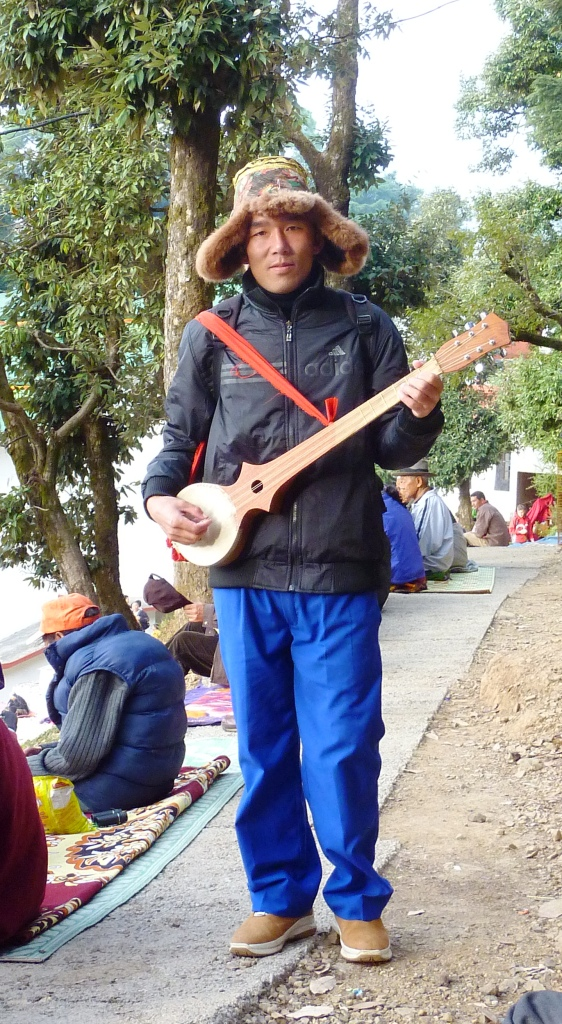
Musician at Tibetan Children's Village, Dharamsala

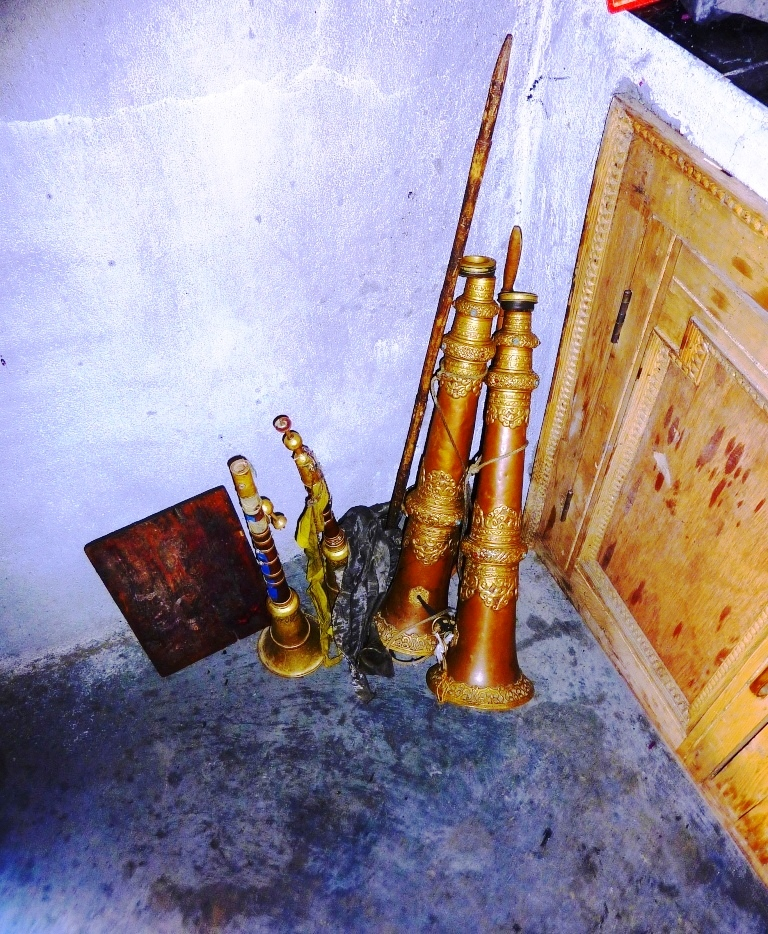
Gyaling and dungchen at Takthok Monastery, Ladakh. 2010

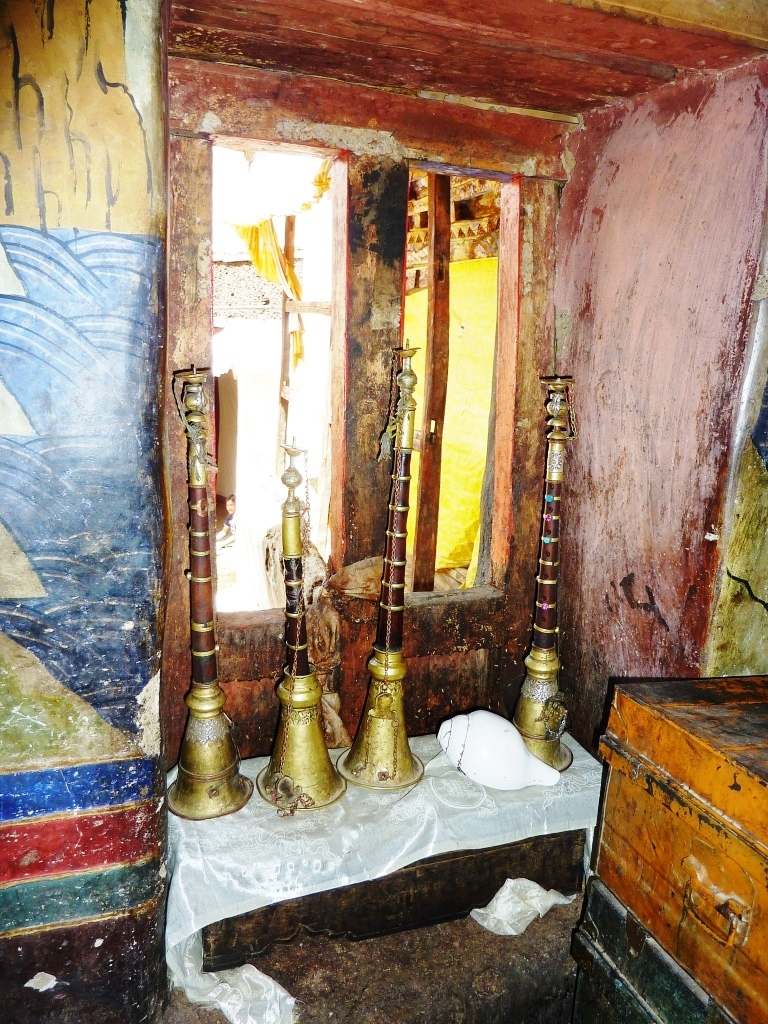
Gyaling. Tagthok Gompa, 2010

== See also ==
- Music of Tibet (album)
- Music of Bhutan
- Dungchen – Musical instrument
- Last Train to Lhasa
- Aku Pema – 2003 song by Palgon
- Sakya Pandita – his 13th-century Treatise on Music provides historical insights into liturgical music theory and practice
- Throat singing § Types of throat singing
- Tuvan throat singing § Kargyraa, related to Tibetan Buddhist chant
- Tibetan Music Awards
- Undertone singing

== General references ==
- Jin, Melinda (15 November 2013). "Tibetan culture more active on domestic, overseas stages". China Tibet Online.
- Crossley-Holland, Peter (Autumn 1976). "The Ritual Music of Tibet". The Tibet Journal. 1 (3/4): 45–54.
- Congdon, Darinda (2007). Tibet Chic: Myth, Marketing, Spirituality and Politics in Musical Representations of Tibet in the United States (PDF) (PhD thesis). University of Pittsburgh.

Media related to Music of Tibet at Wikimedia Commons
