= Tibet Sun =

Tibetan news website

Tibet Sun is an English-language news website focusing on Tibet and the Tibetan people, world news, opinions, essays, and photography from other media. It was founded and produced by Lobsang Wangyal in 2008, and is based in Dharamshala, India. Lobsang conceived the idea of Tibet Sun in 1999, but got the domain in 2004 after chasing the parked domain for two years. The site was launched on 8.8.8 – the opening of the 2008 Summer Olympics in Beijing.

Lobsang specialises in media, art and entertainment and hence Tibet Sun is his media production as a photojournalist. Lobsang is the director of the Miss Tibet pageant, Tibetan Music Awards and Free Spirit Film Festival. He produced the Tibetan Olympics 2008 in Dharamshala.

== Other Tibetan news websites ==
- Phayul.com
- Tibet Mirror
- Tibet Post International
