= Association of Tibetan Journalists =

Tibetan organization

- བོད་ཀྱི་གསར་འགོད་མཐུན་ཚོགས།
- Abbreviation: ATJ
- Formation: December 18, 1997; 28 years ago
- Type: NGO
- Purpose: Professional development and press freedom
- Headquarters: Dharamshala, Himachal Pradesh
- Location: India
- Region served: Tibetan diaspora
- Members: Tibetan journalists in exile

The Association of Tibetan Journalists is a Tibetan organization in exile, that was founded in 1997 in Dharamsala, India. The organization's stated mission is to "Facilitate free, fair and accurate delivering of information regarding activities relating to the Tibetan community, both within and outside of Tibet. Function as a monitoring agency of the Tibetan Government in Exile, regarding the democratic processes implemented. Ensure the welfare and professional indemnity of Tibetan journalists within their professional jurisdiction."

The ATJ advocates for the rights of Tibetan journalists by monitoring cases of censorship, harassment, and arrest of journalists, and by raising awareness about press freedom issues. It also provides training and support to its members through workshops, seminars, and networking opportunities, to improve their skills and enhance the quality of their reporting.

In addition to its advocacy and training work, the ATJ also promotes freedom of the press and access to information for the Tibetan people by advocating for the establishment of a free and independent press in Tibet and by providing news and information to the Tibetan community through its website and social media platforms.

The current executive members:

- Lhakpa Kyizom' President, Journalist of VOA Tibetan Service
- Gurbhum, Vice-president, Chinese section editor of the Voice of Tibet
- Yeshe Choesang, General Secretary, editor in Chief of Tibet Post, a Tibetan Independent News Agency.
- Tenzin Wangyal, accountant, journalist of Radio Free Asia
- Dhonkho, Treasure, journalist of Tibet Times

The founding members were:

- Pema Dhondrup, former producer and editor of the news magazine Sargyur
- Gedun Rabsal, former editor of the Tibet Times
- Kunsang Paljor, journalist of the radio station Voice of Tibet
- Ugyen Norbu, former journalist of Radio Free Asia
- Karma Yeshi, former editor of Rangzen in Tibetan language
- Pema Lhündrup, former editor of Rangzen in English
- Lobsang Wangyal, independent journalist

In 2011, the Association for Tibetan Journalists was awarded a US$7243 grant from the Rowell Fund to create and publish a stylebook in the Tibetan language.The organization states that it will draw upon the Associated Press stylebook for print media and the BBC stylebook for radio.
