= Yamantaka (album) =

Studio album by Mickey Hart, Henry Wolff, and Nancy Hennings
- Released: 1983
- Recorded: November 1982 and July 1991
- Studios: Grateful Dead Sound Studios, San Rafael, California; Rolling Thunder Studio, Novato, California; Pulse Wave Underground Recording Studios, Trumbull, Connecticut
- Genres: World music, Meditation music
- Length: 51:52
- Labels: Celestial Harmonies; CEL 003
- Producer: Brian Keane

Mickey Hart chronology
Däfos (1983)	Yamantaka (1983)	Music to Be Born By (1989)

Yamantaka is an album by percussionist Mickey Hart and Tibetan bell specialists Henry Wolff and Nancy Hennings, best known for their 1972 release Tibetan Bells. Yamantaka was recorded in California in 1982, and was initially released on LP in 1983 by Celestial Harmonies. The album, which features performances on rare and invented percussion instruments, was reissued on CD in 1991 with three additional tracks that were recorded earlier that year in Connecticut, and was included in the five-CD boxed set The Complete Tibetan Bells (1972–1991). Musicians Jody Diamond, Sandy Sawyer, and Brian Keane, who produced the reissued album, also appear on several tracks.

According to the album liner notes, Yamantaka is named for "the Tibetan god of the dead and lord of the underworld." In an interview, Hart noted that there are no membrane-based instruments on the album, commenting: "I never struck a membrane because it sometimes takes away that space of drifting, because it draws your attention to it." He reflected: "This music doesn't have anything to do with anything else. We're so inundated by western music and our own sounds that sometimes we can't hear the purity of other music."

== Reception ==
Professional ratings
Review scores
Source	Rating
AllMusic	5/5 stars

The editors of AllMusic awarded the album a full 5 stars. Reviewer Jim Brenholts called it "one of the darkest and most sinister Tibetan bowl CDs ever," and commented: "This is deep and moving music. Deep listeners will venture into the clutches of Yamantaka. The sinister textures and timbres force listeners to examine the darker sides of their psyches. This is an absolutely essential album."

Dave Connolly of Progrography stated: "Unless you're inclined to sit still for forty minutes of ambient music, a good ten minutes of which is simple resonance, you can pass on this record. But if you believe that music can consist of nothing more than finger cymbals and feedback, a new world awaits on Yamantaka."

Author John Schaefer called Yamantaka "an album of ringing, resonant percussion that defies you to believe it's not electronic."

Yoga Journal's Ramana Das described the music as "deeply peaceful yet intense," and remarked: "The mood and space of life/death transition is realized, and the unfolding of that space is a moving experience worthy of many repetitions."

== CD Track listing ==
1. "The Revolving Mask of Yamantaka" (Mickey Hart, Henry Wolff, Nancy Hennings) – 16:35
2. "Yamantaka Part 1" (Mickey Hart, Henry Wolff, Nancy Hennings) – 1:19
3. "Yamantaka Part 2" (Mickey Hart, Henry Wolff, Nancy Hennings) – 1:48
4. "Yamantaka Part 3" (Mickey Hart, Henry Wolff, Nancy Hennings) – 3:50
5. "Yamantaka Part 4" (Mickey Hart, Henry Wolff, Nancy Hennings) – 4:07
6. "Yamantaka Part 5" (Mickey Hart, Henry Wolff, Nancy Hennings) – 1:36
7. "Yamantaka Part 6" (Mickey Hart, Henry Wolff, Nancy Hennings) – 2:37
8. "Yamantaka Part 7" (Mickey Hart, Henry Wolff, Nancy Hennings) – 3:41
9. "Towards the Bending of the Light" (Nancy Hennings, Brian Keane) – 3:01 (bonus track on CD reissue)
10. "Solar Winds" (Henry Wolff, Brian Keane) – 5:24 (bonus track on CD reissue)
11. "Field of Souls" (Henry Wolff, Brian Keane) – 7:31 (bonus track on CD reissue)

== Performers ==
- Mickey Hart (tracks 1–8)
- Henry Wolff
- Nancy Hennings
- Jody Diamond (tracks 1 and 5)
- Sandy Sawyer (tracks 1 and 5)
- Brian Keane (tracks 9–11)

== Technical personnel ==
- Brian Keane – producer, mixing, engineer (tracks 9–11)
- Dan Healy – engineer, mixing (tracks 1–8)
- Bob Hodas – engineer, mixing (tracks 1–8)
- John Cutler – assistant engineer (tracks 1–8)
- Fred Loulis – assistant engineer (tracks 9–11)
- John Mozzi – assistant engineer (tracks 9–11)
- Rick Kwait – assistant engineer (tracks 9–11)
- Matt Lane – mixing
- Nancy Hennings – illustrations, cover design
- Johanna Shields – design
- John Werner – photography
- Lester Waldman – photography
