= Windhorse =

Windhorse may refer to:

- Wind Horse, an allegory for the human soul in the shamanistic tradition of East Asia and Central Asia.
- Windhorse (film)
