= Standing bell =

Bowl-shaped bell, e.g. a singing bowl

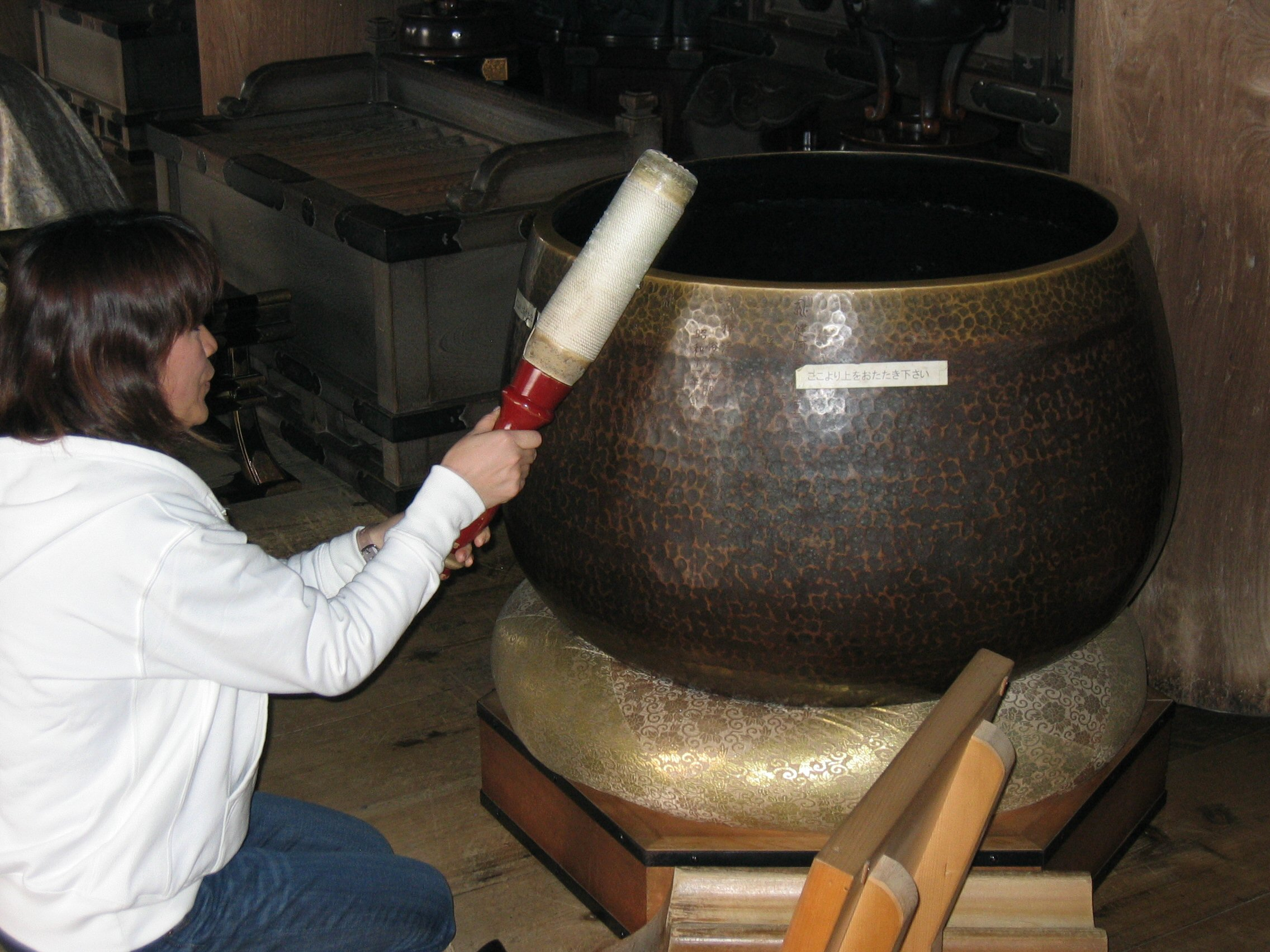
Rin being struck at Kiyomizu-dera, Kyoto

A standing bell or resting bell is an inverted bell, supported from below with the rim uppermost. Such bells are normally bowl-shaped, and exist in a wide range of sizes, from a few centimetres to a metre in diameter. They are often played by striking, but some—known as singing bowls—may also be played by rotating a suede covered mallet around the outside rim to produce a sustained musical note.

Struck bowls are used in some Buddhist religious practices to accompany periods of meditation and chanting. Struck and singing bowls are widely used for music making, meditation and relaxation, as well for personal spirituality. They have become popular with music therapists, sound healers and yoga practitioners.

Standing bells originated in China. An early form called nao took the shape of a stemmed goblet, mounted with rim uppermost, and struck on the outside with a mallet. The manufacture and use of bowls specifically for 'singing' is believed to be a modern phenomenon. Bowls that were capable of singing began to be imported to the West from around the early 1970s. Since then they have become a popular instrument in the US-originating new-age genre often marketed as 'Tibetan music'.

== Nomenclature ==
Standing bells are known by a wide variety of terms in English, and are sometimes referred to as bowls, basins, cups or gongs. Specific terms include resting bell, prayer bowl, Buddha bowl, Himalayan bowl, Tibetan bell, rin gong, bowl gong and cup gong. A bell that is capable of producing a sustained musical note may be known as a singing bowl or Tibetan singing bowl.

Contemporary classical music scores use a variety of other names including temple bell, Buddha temple bell, Japanese temple bell, Buddhist bell, campana di templo and cup bell.

In Japan, the name for a bell of the standing type varies between Buddhist sects. It may be called rin (りん), kin (磬), dobachi, keisu, kinsu (きんす), sahari or uchinarashi, among other things. Large temple bells are sometimes called daikin (大磬), while small versions for a home altar are known as namarin.

The Chinese term qing (磬, or historically 罄), which historically referred to a lithophone used in state rituals, has more recently been applied to this type of standing bell. Early Chinese standing bells are called nao (traditional Chinese: 鐃; simplified Chinese: 铙; pinyin: náo).

== Origins and history ==
There is evidence that the metal bell originated in China, with the earliest known Shang dynasty (16th–11th centuries BCE) bells being among the oldest bronze objects found in China. They possibly originated from grain scoops of standard capacity (the word chung or 'grain measure' is used in many ancient texts to mean a bell).

Early bronze standing bells called nao embody some of the highest technical skills of Chinese civilisation and represent the earliest known form of chiming bell. Taking the shape of hollow-stemmed goblets with a curved rim, nao were made in sizes varying between 8 and 50 cm (3.1 and 19.7 in). They were mounted on their stem, with rim uppermost, and struck on the outside with a mallet. Nao from southern China were produced as single specimens, while in the north they were produced in chimed sets of three. Some were constructed such that striking at two different points would produce different ringing tones.

Bronze bells of substantial size were being cast in China at least as early as the 13th–11th centuries BCE, and the spread of Buddhism in the 2nd–7th centuries CE gave new impetus to the production of large bells for use in rituals. Chinese tradition was, however, unique in that bells were made not only from bronze but also from cast-iron.

Some writers have suggested that the modern singing bowl developed from bowls originally used for food; but others consider that to be unlikely, pointing out that there would be no reason for food bowls to be manufactured with thick rims and with great attention paid to their acoustic properties.

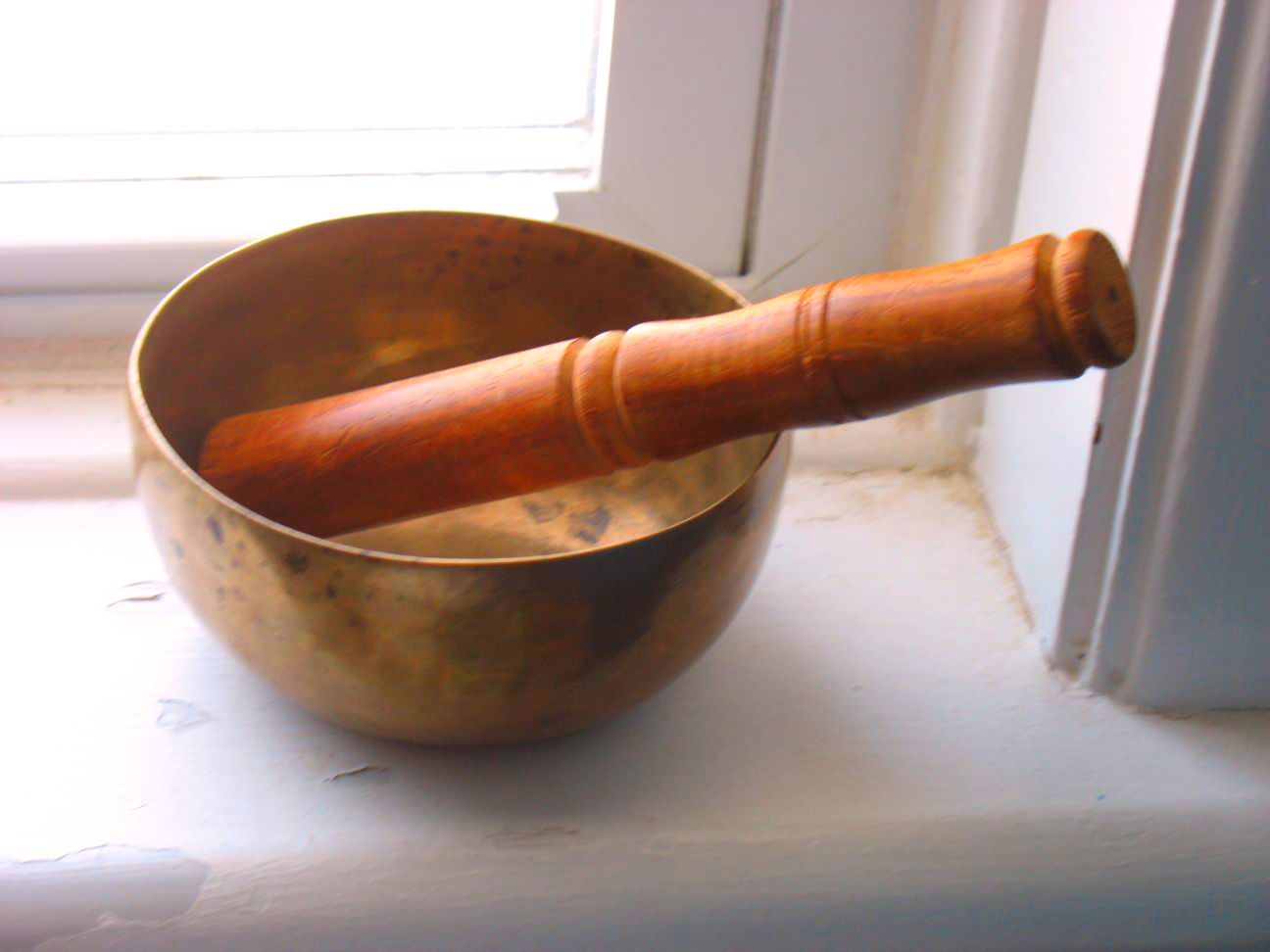
Bowl with wooden striker

Although it is sometimes stated that 'Tibetan singing bowls' date back to a pre-Buddhist, shamanic Bon-Po tradition, the manufacture and use of bowls specifically for the purpose of 'singing' (as opposed to standing bells/bowls that are intended to be struck) is believed to be a modern phenomenon. The historical records and accounts of the music of Tibet are silent about singing bowls. Such bowls are not mentioned by Perceval Landon (a visitor in 1903–1904) in his notes on Tibetan music, nor by any other visitor. Likewise, though ringing and clanging sounds were noted by missionaries interested in traditional Tibetan healing practices, they make no mention of singing bowls. The objects often now referred to as 'Tibetan singing bowls', and marketed as Tibetan ritual instruments, have been called "dharma products" that in fact come from northern India or Nepal, and are neither Tibetan nor ritual in origin.

== Operation ==
=== Types of operation ===
Japanese rin played as struck idiophone

Japanese rin played as friction idiophone, demonstrating chatter

Tibetan singing bowl struck and friction

Musically, these objects are classified as a type of bell (a bell is a hollow object which has maximum vibration around an open rim; a gong on the other hand has maximum vibration towards the centre). They are usually placed on a pillow, to allow the rim to vibrate freely, though small bells may be held gently in the hand.

They are often played by striking, in which case they sound a bell note as a struck idiophone (Hornbostel–Sachs classification 111.242.11).

Alternatively, some bells may be capable of 'singing bowl' operation as a friction idiophone, (Hornbostel–Sachs classification 133.1). In this mode, a wooden mallet sometimes called a wand or puja is rotated around the outside rim to excite continuous vibrations in the bowl by the slip-stick mechanism, the principle being the same as that of water-tuned musical glasses. The volume of the continuous note depends on the speed of the mallet and the force that is applied.

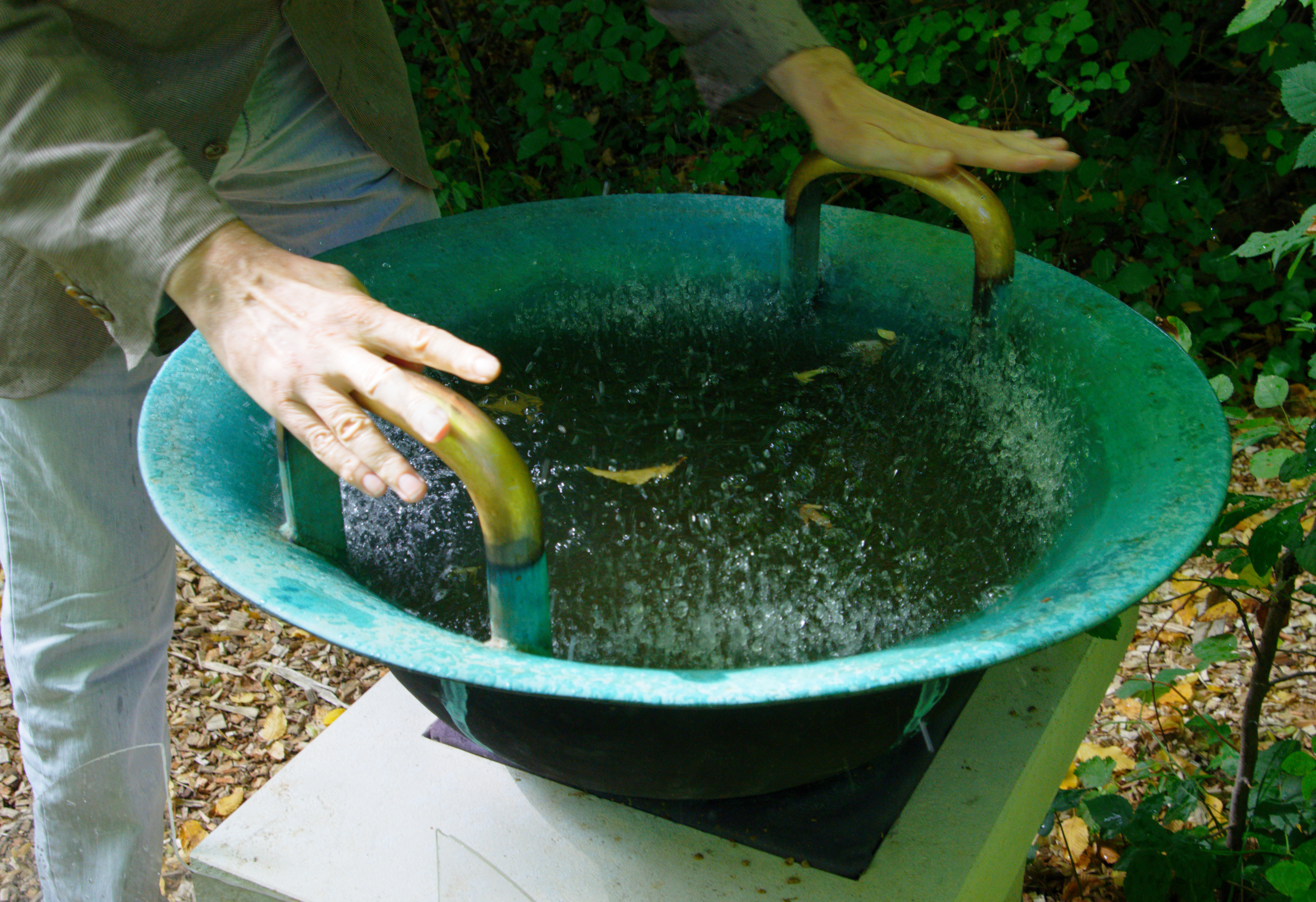
A spouting bowl in use

Singing bowls may be partly filled with water, allowing them to be tuned. A Chinese form known as a 'spouting bowl' has handles which, when rubbed with damp hands, causes water droplets to leap up as a result of standing waves known as Chladni patterns on the water surface. Such bowls are said to have been manufactured from as early as the 5th century BCE.

=== Vibrational behaviour ===
Water spouting in a singing bowl

The vibrational behaviour of bowls has been simulated and has been widely studied both under friction-induced puja excitation and also after being struck. In the former case, experiments indicate that bowls exhibit both radial and tangential motion, in concurrent stable and unstable modes. The unstable mode rotates around the bowl at the same angular velocity as the puja, resulting in beating phenomena always being heard, even with a perfectly symmetrical bowl. Rattling or chattering may occur, particularly with harder puja, lower contact forces and greater angular velocity. Research has also been carried out using loudspeaker-induced oscillation. Studies have investigated the behaviour of bowls partly filled with water, the way in which the resonant response varies with temperature, and the characteristics of drop-ejection from the liquid surface. A BBC report of 2011 includes slow motion video from one of the studies.

== Usage ==
Standing bells are used for religious purposes, music making and meditation, as well as for relaxation and personal well-being. They have become popular with music therapists and sound healers, yoga and meditation practitioners.

=== Religious usage ===
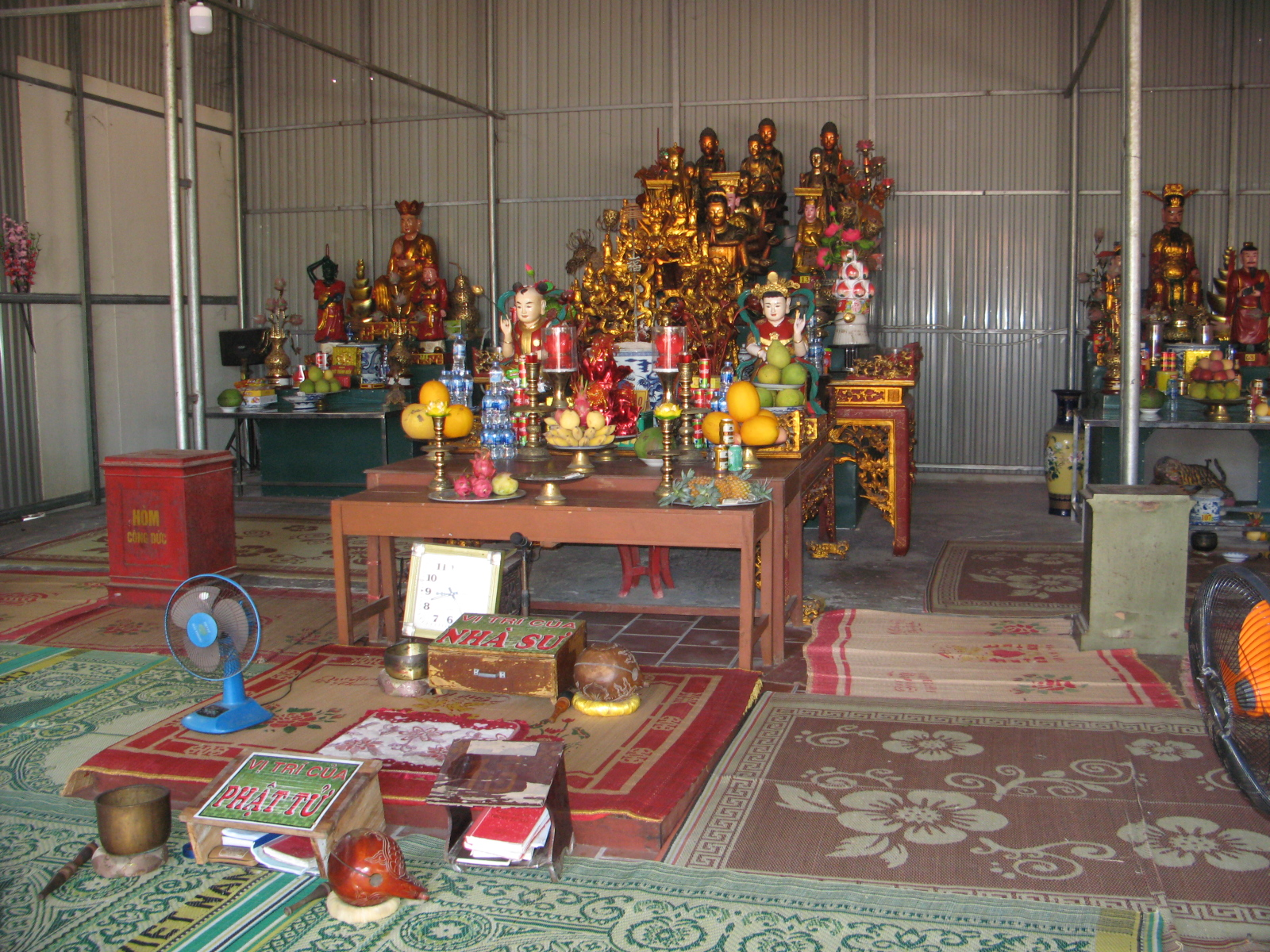
Chuông bát (standing bell) and mõ (wooden fish) at Vạn Linh Khánh Temple, Quảng Ninh, Vietnam

In the religious context, standing bells are primarily associated with Buddhist meditation and chanting, although they are also used in Taoist practices. In Chinese Buddhist temples the chanting of prayers may be punctuated by the striking of a qing, typically a hammered bronze bowl between 10 and 15 cm (3.9 and 5.9 in) in diameter. The qing is usually paired with a muyu (wood block). In Japanese temples, the rin is used along with a rei (a small hand bell), and two percussion instruments: an orugoru (a set of small gongs) and a kei (a stone or metal plate). The rin is also used in household worship. Buddhist ritual makes no use of the 'singing' mode of bell operation.

=== Use in music ===
A 1968 reference mentions the 'celuring-set', said at the date of writing to have been a rare instrument found only in the central Javanese principalities. This consisted of a large ornate frame, on top of which was mounted a set of bronze half-coconut-shaped bowls which were struck with a small iron bar.

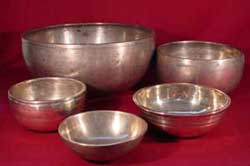
Singing bowls

Bowls that were capable of singing began to be imported to the West from around the early 1970s. The musicians Henry Wolff and Nancy Hennings have been credited with the singing bowl's introduction for musical purposes in their 1972 new-age album Tibetan Bells (although they gave no details of the bowls used in the recording). This was the first in what would become a series of five related releases: Tibetan Bells II (1978), Yamantaka with Mickey Hart (1983), Tibetan Bells III (1988), and Tibetan Bells IV (1991). The albums are based on the concept of taking a spiritual journey, with the music as a guide.

Wolff and Hennings' seminal recording was followed by the development of a unique style of American singing bowl music called 'Tibetan music'. This has remained very popular in the US with many recordings being marketed as World music or New-age music since the introduction of those terms in the 1980s. 'Tibetan singing bowls' have as a result become a prominent visual and musical symbol of Tibet, to the extent that the most prevalent modern representation of Tibet within the US is that of bowls played by Americans.

Standing bells/bowls are called for in several contemporary classical music scores, including Philipe Leroux's Les Uns (2001); John Cage / Lou Harrison's Double Music (1941); Taverner's Total Eclipse (1999); Tan Dun Opera's Marco Polo (1995); Joyce Bee Tuan Koh's Lè (1997); and Robert Paterson's Eating Variations (2006). In Japan they are also used in kabuki theatre.

Longplayer is a musical composition for Tibetan bells by Jem Finer. Six recorded selections from a short piece of source music play simultaneously, at different pitches and speeds, combined such that no combination is repeated until one thousand years has elapsed.

=== Spirituality and healing ===
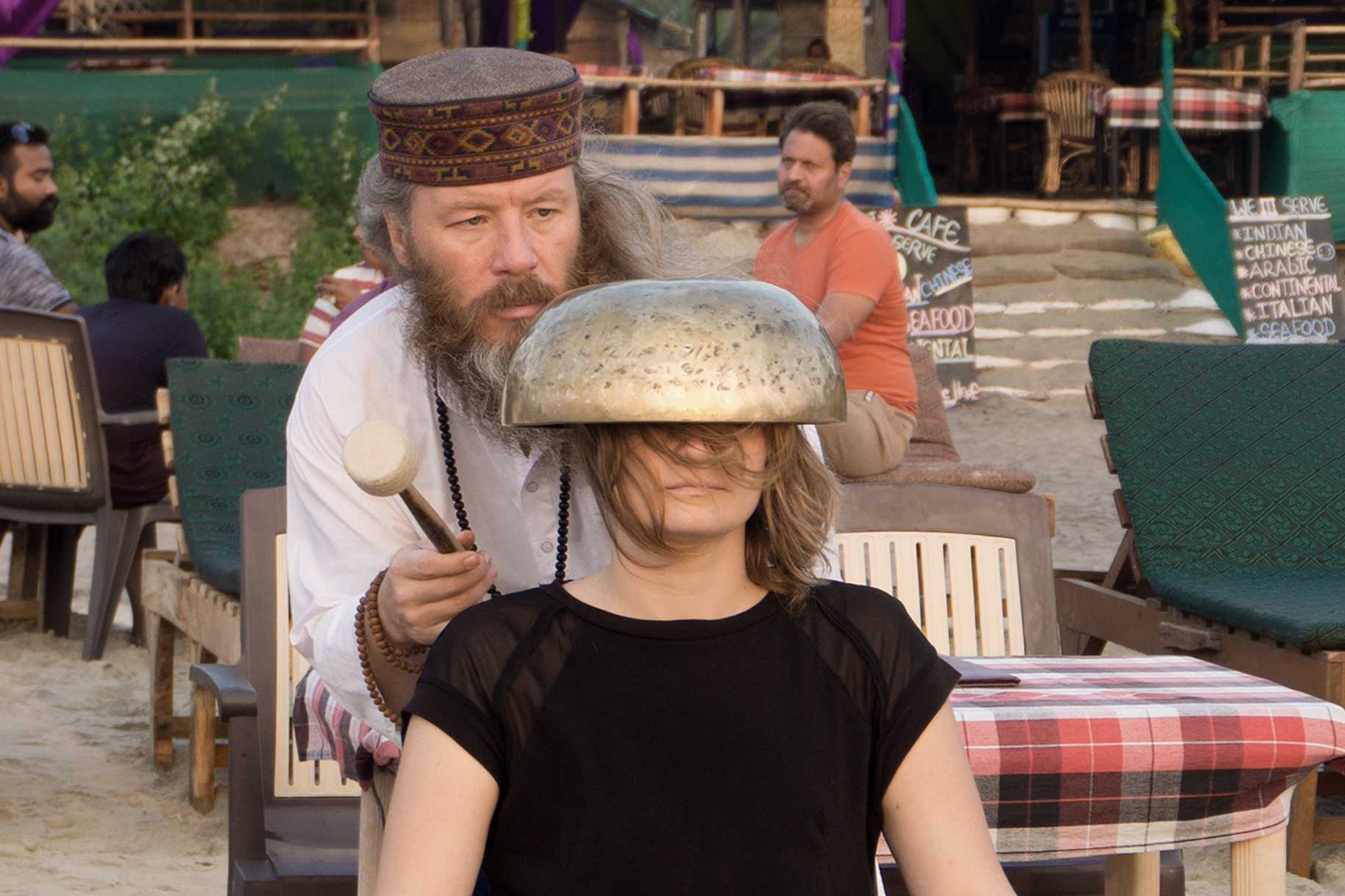
Healing ritual at a beach in Goa (2019)

In the West, singing bowls are sometimes used in alternative medicine, their modern popularity for that purpose perhaps deriving from the modal vibration studies known as Cymatics carried out by the physician Hans Jenny (1904–1972). They are also used in sound therapy and for personal spirituality by those who believe that the sound can work on the chakras. Western recordings of so-called 'Tibetan music' frequently associate the bowls with relaxation, as well as attributing them with healing powers and the ability to create some sort of 'altered state' in the mind of the listener. It has been argued that the altered state (whether meditative, spiritual, drug-related or all three) is a key association with 'Tibetan music' in the US and adds to the market value of that representation of Tibet.

== Manufacture and composition ==
Most standing bells are manufactured substantially of bell metal (an alloy of copper and tin), sometimes with impurities or additions, although variability can be inferred from the variety of alloy colours. They are generally bowl-shaped, and exist in a wide variety of sizes, from a few centimetres to one metre in diameter.

It is sometimes stated that singing bowls are 'traditionally' made of an alloy consisting of various metals, often seven, each associated with a heavenly body. Those commonly mentioned are gold, silver, mercury, copper, iron, tin and lead (or antimony). This is said to be supported by the results of a 1996 analysis of two bowls by Concordia University, which found them to be essentially of bell metal with small quantities—consistent with impurities—of some of the other metals that were looked for, namely lead, zinc, iron and silver. No gold or mercury was found within the accuracy of the measuring apparatus.

Singing bowls are also sometimes said to incorporate meteoritic iron. Some modern 'crystal' bowls are made of re-formed crushed synthetic crystal.

The usual manufacturing technique for standing bells was to cast the molten metal followed by hand-hammering into the required shape. Modern bells/bowls may be made in that way, but may also be shaped by machine-lathing.

The finished article is sometimes decorated with an inscription such as a message of goodwill, or with decorative motifs such as rings, stars, dots or leaves. Bowls from Nepal sometimes include an inscription in the Devanagari script.

== Bibliography ==
- Perry, Frank (2015). The Complete Book of Singing Bowls: Himalayan sound revelations. New Delhi: Adarsh Books. ISBN 9788183631204.
- Congdon, Darinda (2007). Tibet Chic: Myth, Marketing, Spirituality and Politics in Musical Representations of Tibet in the United States (PDF) (Doctor of Philosophy thesis). University of Pittsburgh.
- Jansen, Eva Rudy (1992). Singing Bowls: a Practical Handbook of Instruction and Use. Diever, Holland: Binkey Kok. ISBN 978-90-74597-01-2.
- Sadie, Stanley, ed. (1984). The New Grove Dictionary of Musical Instruments. Macmillan Press. ISBN 978-0-333-37878-6.
