= Yeshe Choesang =

Tibetan-born Indian journalist and photographer

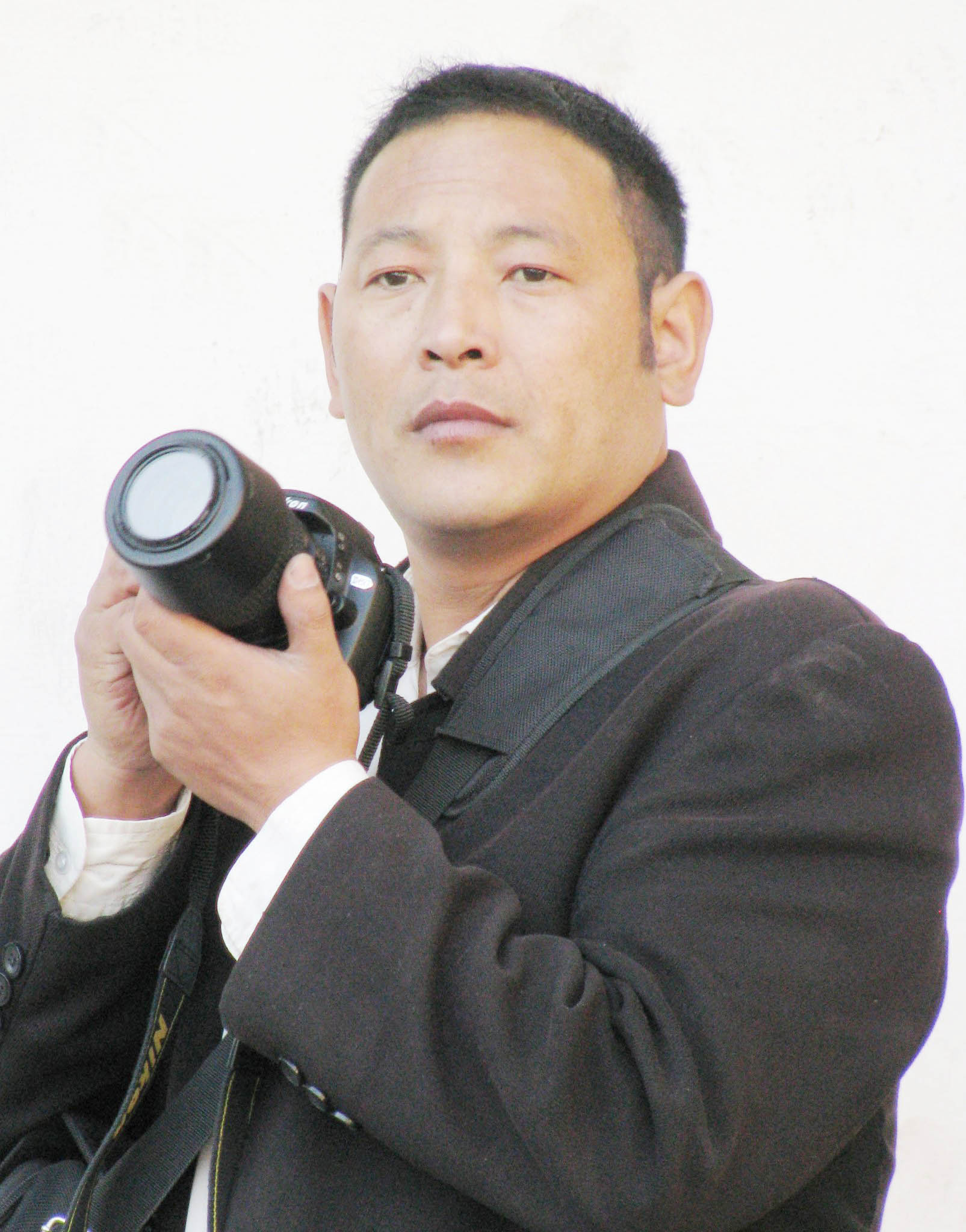
Choesang in 2009

Yeshe Choesang is an India-based Tibetan journalist, photographer and author who focuses on politics, freedom of press, business, human rights and environmental issues in Tibet and China.

== Biography ==
Yeshe Choesang (Tibetan: ཡེ་ཤེས་ཆོས་བཟང་། Chinese: 益西曲桑 Hindi: यीशि छोसं), pronounced [ˈyeːshey ˈchoe: Zang]), born in 1974 in Lithang Region in eastern Tibet, is a Tibetan journalist, founder and editor in chief of The Tibet Post, an exiled Tibetan news Agency based in Dharamsala, India.

Mr Choesang was born on 18 August 1974 in the Lithang Region in eastern Tibet, (Currently administratively part of Sichuan province, China). He escaped to India in 1985.

=== Education ===
He completed his education in Tibetan culture and religion (The Rigne Rabjam) in 1993 and a teacher training course of the Tibetan Education Department in 1995. He completed his B.A. in Tibetan Buddhist philosophy from the Institute of Buddhist Dialectics (IBD).

In 2000, he was a member of the editorial board of How To Teach, a bilingual teacher training book series in Tibetan and English for Tibetan teachers. For 4 years, he worked as a researcher in World History at the Research & Translation Centre (Lhaksam Tsekpa) of IBD.

=== Media career ===
Choesang wrote several articles in the past 10 years that were published by Tibet Post, CNN iReport, Deliberation, and World News Network.

Choesang has written a book titled "Voice of An Exiled Tibetan: Hopes of freedom and struggle" was published in 2014. He is writing a second book, but title yet to be named.

He was elected thrice as the General Secretary of the Association of Tibetan Journalists based in Dharamsala. He is the Tibet Correspondent for Reporters Without Borders since 2005.

In 2007 Choesang founded The Tibet Post International (TPI), a daily Tibetan news agency based in McLeod Ganj, Dharamsala. Other than this, he has also founded several other websites, like outlooktibet.com, shambalapost.com and lhasapost.com. The office of TPI was inaugurated on 11 May 2008 by Franz Pahl, a member of South Tyrolean People's Party and President of the regional parliament of South Tyrol in Italy.

In 2010, he also founded Himalayan Literacy Trust (HLT) in India.

=== Community development ===
With HLT and TPI Choesang aims to develop Tibetan media and education in a peaceful and non-violent manner. His organisations also function as a platform to enable future development of Tibetan journalism, doing so by coordinating a group of young Tibetan journalists with the primary goal of promoting democracy through freedom of expression within Tibetan communities, both in exile and under occupation in Tibet.

With TPI Choesang works in cooperation with non-governmental organizations and individuals around the world as well as with the various departments of the Central Tibetan Administration while dealing at the same time with individuals and societies in various Tibetan settlements and schools.

== Books ==
- Voice of an Exiled Tibetan: Hopes of Freedom and Struggle (2014)
- The Monster Purges of the 20th Century: Chinese Characteristics of Socialism: A Deceptive Framework Built on Stalinism – A Critical Reappraisal (2025)
- Light of Compassion, Courage, and Wisdom — A Beacon of Peace and Harmony —: A 90th Birthday Tribute to His Holiness the 14th Dalai Lama of Tibet (2025)
- Tibet on Blaze: Self-Immolation Protests: The Unyielding Flame of Tibetan Freedom and Resistance (2025)
- Monster Evil: China or Coronavirus?: Coronavirus, Authoritarianism, and Global Betrayal: How the CCP’s Enablers Fueled a Worldwide Catastrophe (2025)
- A Stable, Calm Mind: Evolving from Inner Wisdom to Mental Clarity in Modern Science (2025)
- The Awakening of Utruwn: Survival or Extinction? The Reckoning of Two Worlds (2025)
