= Rangzen Shonu =

Rangzen Shonu (Tibetan: རང་བཙན་གཞོན་ནུ་, Wylie: rang btsan gzhon nu: "Freedom Youth") was a three-member rock band formed by Tenzin Choesang, Norbu Choephel and Tsering Paljor Phurpatsang. Tibetans in Dharamshala, India.

They released their debut album Rangzen Shonu in 1987, with a lyrics booklet. The songs were written by Professor Ngawang Jinpa of St Joseph's College, Darjeeling. The album was recorded at S Kalyani Recording Studio in Darya Ganj, Delhi.

Their second album Rangzen Sontsa was released in 1989, which was also recorded at the same studio. The lyrics for the second album was written by Dagthon Jampa Gyaltsen, Tibetan Astronomy and Astrology master at Mentseekhang (Tibetan Medical Institute) Dharamshala, India.

Their songs are about Tibetan love and freedom. The song Ngatso Bhoe ki Dokpa (We Tibetan Nomads) from the first album became an all-time favourite. It has been covered, and is continued to be covered even today. The love song Nga-yi Nying gi Sidu (The core of my heart) is another much loved song from their first album.

The first album Rangzen Shonu won the Best Album award in the first Tibetan Music Awards produced by Lobsang Wangyal Productions in 2003 in McLeod Ganj.

Dadon reportedly integrated some of Rangzen Shonu's signature style after hearing a cassette smuggled into Tibet in 1988. Rangzen Shonu is best known for the unique sound of Tibetan lyrics accompanied by acoustic guitars rather than traditional Tibetan instruments.

== Albums ==
- Rangzen Shonu (1987)
- Rangzen Sontsa (1989)
- Modern Tibetan Songs (1995?)

== Awards ==
- Won "Best Album" at 2003 Tibetan Music Awards
