= Tsering Chungtak =

Tibetan beauty pageant contestant 2006

- Born: December 25, 1984; Shillong, India
- Died: July 21, 2016 (aged 31); Majnu-ka-tilla, India
- Education: University of Delhi; Jawaharlal Nehru University
- Occupations: Model, researcher
- Known for: Miss Tibet 2006

Tsering Chungtak (December 25, 1984 – July 21, 2016) Was a Tibetan people model and beauty pageant titleholder who represented Tibet at the 2006 edition of the environmentally oriented beauty pageant Miss Earth 2006. She was the first Tibetan woman to participate in any major international beauty contest. Tsering pursued her undergraduate studies from Hindu College, University of Delhi and was pursuing her PhD degree in Sociology from Jawaharlal Nehru University. She was working as a research scholar with Ayur Gyan Nyas, an organisation creating curriculum on secular ethics for students from class one to twelve.

== Miss Tibet 2006 pageant ==
Chungtak, a student of sociology in Hindu college, University of Delhi was crowned Miss Tibet in 2006 at a contest in the northern Indian town of Dharamsala ,Himachal pradesh , home to a majority of Tibetan exiles and the seat of the 14th Dalai Lama. Born in Shillong, she was an alumna of the lower-Tibetan Community Village School. She also took the title of Miss Photogenic after securing 1740 votes of the total 3909 votes cast in the online public poll; held in the Tibetan Institute of Performing Arts (TIPA), the finale of the Miss Tibet 2006 contest drew a large crowd of local Tibetan youth. She received a scholarship cheque of 100,000 Indian rupees.

== Miss Earth 2006 participation ==
Chungtak competed as one of the 90 contestants in the environmentally-oriented Miss Earth 2006 beauty pageant. Aside from her environmental advocacy, she used her platform to say that "Tibet is not a part of China" and "there is no freedom in Tibet". She also advocated for the boundaries of acceptable social etiquette towards modernity, in a traditionally conservative Tibetan culture, where most grown women wear ankle-length dresses. Nonetheless, her participation in the pageant received an approval from the Dalai Lama. She made more headlines in December 2007 when she withdrew her participation in the Miss Tourism contest, a minor international beauty pageant held in Malaysia, after organizers reacted to pressure from Beijing and asked her to add "China" to her "Miss Tibet" title by wearing a sash labeled "Miss Tibet-China".

== Tibetan Olympics ==
Tsering led a run with Tibetans who live in Taiwan, at Chiang Kai-shek Memorial Hall, Sunday, February 24, 2008, in Taipei, as part of the torch relay for the Tibetan Olympics to be held in Dharamsala, India, the seat of the Tibetan government in exile, on May 15, 2008. The relay for a sports event organized by Tibetans in exile to counter the Beijing Olympics arrived on Taiwan Sunday on the third leg of a 10-city tour. The photo of Tsering Chungtak taken by Associated Press in Taiwan was the "pick of the day" of XPRESS Newspaper, sister paper of Gulf News, which is based in the United Arab Emirates; the newspaper looks daily for the best photos from around the globe.

== Death ==
Chungtak died on July 21, 2016, in Majnu-ka-tilla of cardiac arrest. She was 31.
