= Dadon =

Tibetan singer and actress

Dadon (Tibetan: ཟླ་སྒྲོན, Wylie: zla sgron), full name Dadon Dawa Dolma (Tibetan: ཟླ་སྒྲོན་ཟླ་བ་སྒྲོལ་མ་) is a Tibetan singer and actress.

== Biography ==
Dadon was born in Tibet in 1968. In 1985, she obtained a music degree at Music Department of Central Institute for Minorities in Beijing.

In 1988, she studied voice at the China Conservatory of Music in Beijing. Representing Tibet at national Chinese music competitions in 1988 and 1990, she won a silver medal each time.

She made five albums in Tibet. Her music, which is characterized by a mixture of traditional and popular folklore, was also critical of the situation in her country, which is considered by the Chinese authorities to be a threat to the state.

Inspired by the Taiwanese singer Teresa Teng, Dadon also incorporated some styles of Tibetan rock band Rangzen Shonu after hearing a tape smuggled into Lhasa in 1988.

In 1992, she decided to flee and was granted political asylum in the United States (Middletown, Connecticut).

Her defection was cited in an internal speech by the Secretary of the CPC Tibet Committee Chen Kuiyuan in 1997, as well as the TV journalist Ngawang Choephel and director of the Tibet Hotel in Lhasa Jamyang Choegyal, son of Minister Kashopa Chogyal Nyima, two other government employees.

In 1997, with her 3-year-old son Tenzin Tashi, she participated in a march for Tibet led from Toronto to New York, by Thupten Jigme Norbu, and the Tibetan Freedom Concert in New York.

== Film ==
Dadon has worked in several films.

In 1998, she played Dolkar, the leading role in a film directed by Paul Wagner, Windhorse, partly based on her life story.

In 2001, she composed the music for the film Samsara directed by Pan Nalin.

In 2006, she composed music and was a narrator of the documentary Vajra Sky Over Tibet led by John Bush.
