= Aku Pema =

2003 song by Palgon

Aku Pema (Tibetan: ཨ་ཁུ་པདྨ་, Wylie: a khu pad ma; Amdo Tibetan [akʰɯ panma]) is a Tibetan song, written by the Tibetan singer Palgon (Wylie: dpal mgon, Amdo Tibetan Tibetan pronunciation: [χʷalɡon]). It is considered to be calling for the Dalai Lama to return, but this is indirect. At no point during the song do the lyrics mention the Dalai Lama. The reference to the Dalai Lama is through a nickname Aku Pema, Tibetan for Uncle Lotus, which is a name for the Dalai Lama in Amdo, Tibet. The song won the best lyrics award at the 2003 Tibetan Music Awards.

== Lyrics ==
"Uncle Pema"
By Palgon (original in Tibetan)

Oh Uncle Pema!
Oh mighty Eagle adorned with a conch-white stripe!
If you soar up heavenwards, you adorn the azure sky,
If you descend earthwards, you gladden the craggy mountains.
And, your absence makes the craggy ledges bereft of any life!
Oh Uncle Pema!
Duck with the golden rosary
If you fly out of the water, you adorn the meadows,
If you swim in the water, you gladden the water’s spirits
And, your absence makes the lake bereft of life and spirit!
Oh Uncle Pema!
Oh handsome Youth, adorned with conch-white teeth like a tiger!
If you go [a]way, you are a credit to your fellow townsfolk, and
If you come this way, you are a star amongst your peers.
And, your absence makes my heart bereft of love and meaning!

== See also ==
- Tibet
- Dalai Lama
- Music of Tibet
- Amdo
