= Team Tibet =

Sporting organization by Tibetan exiles in India

Team Tibet is a sporting organization representing Tibetan exiles. Formed in India in 2001 as the Tibetan National football team, the group planned to participate in Beijing in the 2008 Summer Olympics as Tibet, but their request was rejected by the IOC.

== See also ==
- Tibetan Olympics 2008
