= Lobsang Wangyal =

Indian writer, social activist and photojournalist

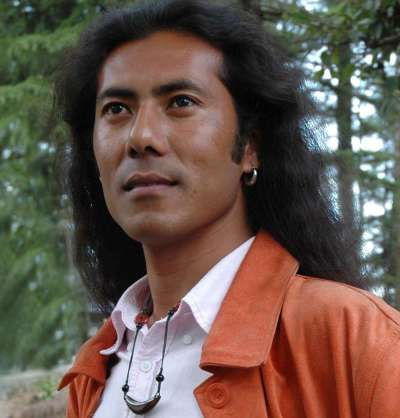
- Lobsang Wangyal, 2006
- Born: 1970 (age 55–56); Orissa, India
- Education: BA 1995, Shimla, Himachal Pradesh
- Occupations: Photojournalist, Events producer, Web producer
- Website: lobsangwangyal.com

Lobsang Wangyal (born 1970) is a writer, social activist, photojournalist, and events producer, based in McLeod Ganj, Dharamshala, India. He has been a stringer reporter and photographer for Agence France-Presse.

Through his eponymous company, Lobsang Wangyal Productions, he has been producing Tibetan cultural events since 2000, the best-known of which is the yearly Miss Tibet Pageant. He also maintains a news website, Tibet Sun, beginning in 2008.

He is considered an icon in Tibetan exile popular culture.

== Biography ==
Lobsang was born in 1970 in Orissa in east India, in a small Tibetan refugee village. His father, Tsering Tendhar (late), was from Kham (Tehor), in eastern Tibet and his mother, Tsering Dolkar, from southern Tibet. They were in their teens when they escaped the Chinese suppression of the 1959 Tibetan uprising.

He graduated from Central School for Tibetans, Mussoorie, and attended college in Shimla, Himachal Pradesh, for his BA degree, which he obtained in 1995. He has been working as a photojournalist since 1994.

He was a founding member of the Association of Tibetan Journalists in 1997, and was president of the organisation for two terms, from 2004 to 2009.

He became a producer in 2000 with the Free Spirit Festival, and produced the first Miss Tibet pageant in 2002. He has gone on to produce more events, mostly in McLeod Ganj, and a film festival in Hawaii. His productions are mostly funded by himself through his photojournalism. He reached a high point in his career as a showman when he produced a show for Prince Charles in October 2003.

He is also a dancer, graphics designer, and web producer.

== Photographer and journalist ==
Lobsang has been working as a photojournalist since 1994. Except for a crash course in journalism, he is self-taught in both this field and photography. He was taught photography by friends and visitors in McLeod Ganj, and went on to make news photography his day job, with many unattributed photos in stories for Agence France-Presse. His photos appear in the books Little Lhasa: Reflections on Exiled Tibet, by Tsering Namgyal, and Tibet in Exile, published by Friedrich Naumann Stiftung in 2002, as well as "Beyond Shangri-La" in the "Five Candles Photography Exhibition" in 2000 in the Prince of Wales Museum, India. Lobsang Wangyal photography is also on the web at LobsangWangyal.com Photography, in various news stories at TibetSun.com, and unattributed in AFP stories.

== Producer and director ==
Lobsang Wangyal began his producing career in 2000, when he started an eponymous company, Lobsang Wangyal Productions] and produced the Free Spirit Festival — an event to celebrate contemporary Tibetan arts and culture.

His longest-running production started in 2002: the Miss Tibet Pageant, a platform for young Tibetan women to showcase their talents and aspirations. This event has continued yearly.

Lobsang conceived the idea of the Miss Himalaya Pageant in early 2010 and produced the inaugural event in October 2012.

The Tibetan Music Awards (held every two years) and Free Spirit Film Festival followed. He started the Free Spirit Award in 2003, to honour the works of artistes and individual supporters of the Tibetan cause in particular, and world peace, social and environmental issues in general.

He has also produced one-time events such as a film festival in Hawaii, US, in January 2007. In October 2003 he produced a show for Prince Charles at the Tibetan camp Majnu ka Tilla in Delhi. His most ambitious production, in 2008, was the Tibetan Olympics 2008 in Dharamshala, India.

His productions have expanded world-wide, with Sing for Tibet, first held in McLeod Ganj, Brussels, and New York on 10 October 2010, and yearly in various cities thereafter, and Tibet Fashion Week being planned for Paris.

All productions are mostly funded by himself through his own works.

== Other works and appearances ==
=== Writing ===
- Choosing The Next Dalai Lama: Chinese Checkers Over Reincarnation 2 April 2019 at SNIWire.com.
- Opinion pieces, features, and interviews at TibetSun.com.

=== Film ===
- Lobsang Wangyal appeared as the "Love Guru" in the first production of the movie Richard Gere is My Hero by Tashi Wangchuk, 2007.
- As a "long-haired sweater-seller" in Dreaming Lhasa by Tenzing Sonam and Ritu Sarin, 2005.
- As himself in Tibetan Warrior, a film about Loten Namling's quest, by Dodo Hunziker, 2015.
- As himself in Miss Tibet: Beauty in Exile by Norah Shapiro, 2014.

=== Interviews ===
- Has conducted many interviews with Tibet-related figures, among them Samdhong Rinpoche, TYC President Tenzing Jigme, and author/photographer Vijay Kranti, all published on TibetSun.com.
- Has been interviewed and presented several times on Voice of America.

=== Quotes and citations ===
- Cited in acknowledgements, quoted, and referenced, in a book regarding Tibetan self-immolations, Tibet on Fire, by John Whalen-Bridge, 2016.
- Cited throughout book Little Lhasa: Reflections on Exile Tibet, by Tsering Namgyal, 2006, with focus in Chapter 5, "Miss Tibet",

=== Social service ===
- Speaking: Speaks on environmental and social issues at his events.
- Free Spirit Award : Presents a Free Spirit Award annually to selected social/environmental activists.
- Indian Passport for Tibetans: In 2016 initiated a PIL (Public Interest Litigation) for implementation of the Indian Citizenship Act for Tibetan refugees in India, which was joined by Phuntsok Wangyal and Tenzin Dhonden. On 22 September 2016 the case was won, with the Delhi High Court agreeing, and ordering all Tibetans who meet the criteria of being Indian citizens by birth to be treated as Indians, and to be issued passports upon applying.
