= Music to Be Born By =

Studio album by Mickey Hart and Taro Hart
- Released: 1989
- Recorded: 1983
- Studio: The office of Gerald P. Wilmer M.D., Greenbrae, California; The Barn, Novato, California
- Genre: Ambient
- Length: 1:10:10
- Label: Rykodisc; RCD 20112
- Producer: Mickey Hart

Mickey Hart chronology
Yamantaka (1983)	Music to Be Born By (1989)	At the Edge (1990)

Music to Be Born By is an album by percussionist Mickey Hart that is based on the fetal heartbeat of his son Taro Hart, who was born on January 13, 1983. The album was released in 1989 by Rykodisc, and was later reissued by Smithsonian Folkways as part of their Mickey Hart Collection.

During a visit to the family's obstetrician, Hart recorded his unborn son's heartbeat on a Nagra portable recorder that was attached to a fetal pulse monitor placed on the stomach of Taro's mother, Mary Holloway Hart. (On the album, she is credited for providing "heartbeat environment.") Later, in his studio, Hart transferred the sounds to 16-track tape, after which he, along with flutist Steve Douglas and bassist Bobby Vega, overdubbed additional tracks. The music was then played at the baby's birth. According to Hart, the recording is intended "to facilitate and coordinate rhythmic breathing cycles, assisting the mother's concentration and focus before, during and after delivery."

Hart initially had no intention of issuing the music to the general public, and sent copies on cassette tape to friends who inquired about it. However, he later decided to release it due to ongoing positive feedback and an increasing number of requests. He reflected: "I have maybe a thousand letters and pictures of babies born to this music... Most cultures have birthing music: music to be born by. We don't. We lost that ritual."

At the time of the album's release, Taro Hart was credited as being "the world's youngest recording artist."

== Reception ==
Professional ratings
Review scores
Source	Rating
AllMusic	2.5/5 stars

AllMusic's William Ruhlmann called the album "soothing," while author Julia Cameron described it as "propulsive, energizing, and grounding." Mark Saleski of Something Else! listed the album as one of his "favorite minimalist/ambient recordings," and wrote: "this record presents a warm percussive wash using wood flute, drums and bass harmonics. The pattern is altered very slightly throughout. Hypnotic is the word."

== Track listing ==
1. "Music to Be Born By" – 1:10:10

== Performers ==
- Mickey Hart – surdo
- Taro Hart – heartbeat
- Mary Holloway Hart – heartbeat environment
- Steve Douglas – wooden flute
- Bobby Vega – electric bass

== Technical personnel ==
- John Cutler – engineer
- Jeff Sterling – assistant engineer
- Tom Flye – assistant engineer, remixing
- Joe Gastwirt – mastering
- Steven Jurgensmeyer – cover art
- Fredric Lieberman – consultant
