= John Bush (filmmaker) =

Film director, cinematographer, and visual artist

John Bush is a film director, cinematographer, and visual artist based in New York City. Bush's documentary film trilogy of Buddhist pilgrimage in Southeast Asia and Tibet, The Yatra Trilogy, later renamed Journey into Buddhism by PBS, was broadcast nationwide as a 4.5 hour PBS mini-series, as well as in Europe and South Africa.

John Bush's films have been official selections in various major film festivals in competition for Best Documentary, including the Bangkok International Film Festival, the Rome Film Festival, and the Filmfest München (the Munich International Film Festival). Direct Pictures is his production company in Lower Manhattan.

== Film career ==
John Bush began making films in 2000, after a long career as CEO and creative force of Illuminations.

In 2013, PBS broadcast John Bush's 4.5 hour film series, The Yatra Trilogy, nationwide – retitling it Journey Into Buddhism and changing it into a three-part mini-series. The show played in primetime in eighty five percent of United States media markets and was also broadcast in Europe and South Africa. The trilogy's films are Dharma River, Prajna Earth and Vajra Sky Over Tibet. WGBH-TV Boston is the presenting station. PBS distributes the films for home video in North America.

The 14th Dalai Lama offered a message for Vajra Sky over Tibet including, “I am grateful to John Bush for his dedication to this project,” and “I wish this film every success.” The film was screened during the Dalai Lama's appearances in more than a dozen cities.

Amazon Prime Video features Journey Into Buddhism as a 3 episode, 4 hour long streaming series. The series is currently available in the US and Canada, with worldwide access coming soon.

John Bush has made eight dance films throughout his film career with French-born New York dancer and choreographer, Nadine Helstroffer, who has been called "a performer and choreographer of fierce concentration and focus" by The New York Times. The films have played in over 100 festivals in 28 countries, including the Cannes Film Festival and the Spoleto Festival, or Festival dei Due Mondi. Their films won the Gold Remi Award for Performing Arts at the Houston International Film Festival, The Gold Kahuna Award at the Honolulu Film Awards, and First Prize at the Cyprus International Film Festival.

John Bush is currently in post-production on his new feature-length documentary. The film is a cultural portrait of the 5,000-year-old, still thriving, Pilgrimage tradition in modern India. The film travels 2,500 miles to legendary pilgrim destinations from the shrines of the Himalayas to the shore temples at India's southern tip. Bush and an Indian crew traveled as pilgrims for nearly a year in total to film this picture. The film includes interviews with Indian pilgrims, author & teacher Ram Dass, Grammy nominated singers Krishna Das (singer) and Jai Uttal, vocal artist Deva Premal, and others.

== Filmography ==
- Into the Heart of India (2018)
- The Yatra Trilogy/Journey into Buddhism (2013)
- Vajra Sky Over Tibet
- Prajna Earth
- Dharma River
- With Nadine Helstroffer:
  - Bhairavi Sky
  - Ajar
  - Dream On Me
  - Absence Presence
  - Sky Scraper
  - Hourglass
  - Zephyr
  - Portal
  - Vajra Realm

== See also ==
- Vajra
