= Tibet Times =

Tibetan Newspaper

Tibet Times (Tibetan: བོད་ཀྱི་དུས་བབ།, Wylie: bod-kyi-dus-bab; Tournadre: Bhö kyi Dhübap) is a Tibetan-language newspaper founded in 1996 and published every ten days from Dharamshala, Himachal Pradesh, India, the residence of the 14th Dalai Lama. Besides, its newspaper publication, Tibet Times also have a Tibetan language website and also Mobile App which disseminates breaking, unbiased and informative news to its reader on a day-to day basis.

The underlying philosophy of the news agency centers on the need for an independent press to an exiled community.

The newspaper covers a range of subjects including the current situation in Tibet, the Tibetan diaspora, and the voice of the general people. It claims to have the largest circulation within Tibetan communities both in and outside Asia.
