= Windhorse (film) =

- Directed by: Paul Wagner
- Written by: Julia Elliot; Thupten Tsering; Paul Wagner
- Produced by: Paul Wagner
- Starring: Dadon; Jampa Kalsang Tamang; Richard Chang
- Cinematography: Steve Schecter
- Edited by: Tony Black; Paul Wagner
- Music by: Sam Chapin; John Dana; Tommy Hayes
- Release date: September 16, 1998 (Toronto)
- Running time: 97 minutes
- Country: United States
- Language: Tibetan

Windhorse is an American film from 1998, directed and produced by Paul Wagner, co-directed by Thupten Tsering and co-produced with Julia Elliott. The leading roles were played by Dadon, Jampa Kalsang Tamang and Richard Chang.

Shot in Tibet and Nepal in 1996, the film is notable for being the first commercially released film shot on digital cameras - a prototype of the digital-beta Sony DVW-700WS and the prosumer Sony DCE-VX1000. The offline editing (Avid) and the online post and color work (Roland House / da Vinci) were also all digital. The film, transferred to 35mm negative for theatrical release, won Best U.S. Independent Film at the Santa Barbara Film Festival in March 1998, also co-winning the Best Director award. The film's international premiere was at the Toronto International Film Festival on September 16, 1998. The film was released theatrically in 1999 by Shadow Distribution and played in over 100 theaters in North America.

== Plot ==
The film is set in Tibet. In a remote Himalayan village in Western Tibet, three young Tibetans - Dorjee, his sister Dolkar and their cousin Pema - witness their grandfather murdered by Chinese soldiers. Years later, the three children are living in Lhasa, the capital of Tibet, and their lives have taken different directions. Dolkar became a pop star and assimilated into contemporary Chinese culture. Dorjee turns to hating the Chinese government. Pema becomes a Buddhist nun, joining a nunnery a few miles from Lhasa. When Pema is arrested after demonstrating against the Chinese government, her cousins are caught up in the dangerous activities of the Tibetan resistance movement.

== Reception ==
On the review aggregator website Rotten Tomatoes, 63% of 8 critics' reviews are positive.

== Awards and nominations ==
Year	Awards	Categories	Recipient	Result
1998	Florida Film Festival	Audience Award for Best Feature	Paul Wagner	Won
1998	Florida Film Festival	Grand Jury Award	Paul Wagner	Nominated
1998	Santa Barbara Film Festival	Best U.S. Independent Film Award	Paul Wagner	Won
1998	Santa Barbara Film Festival	Best Director	Paul Wagner	Won
