= Tibetan Olympics 2008 =

- City: Dharamsala
- Dates: 15–25 May 2008

The Tibetan Olympics 2008 (Tibetan: བོད་མིའི་རྩེད་འགྲན་ཆེན་མོ་, Wylie: bod-mii rtsed-'gran chen-mo) was held from 15 to 25 May 2008 in Dharamsala, in northern India. Its purpose was to ensure that Tibetans could also celebrate the excitement of world's biggest sporting event – the 2008 Olympic Games in Beijing – following the approach of sports and communication.

The event was announced at a press conference in McLeod Ganj on 15 May 2007. There were two championships – Men and Women. Twenty-three participants competed, ten women and 13 men. Each participant took part in ten different sports, which included long-distance running, swimming, shooting, archery, and track and field events. The winners of the Women's Championships were Tsering Lhamo, First place, Dhartso Kyi, Second place, and Dolkar Tso, Third place. Winners of the men's championships were Dorji Tsering, First place, Dawa Dakpa, Second place, and Tenzin Choephel, Third place.

Lobsang Wangyal Productions, the company behind the event, has also organized other art and entertainment events including the Miss Tibet pageant, and a film festival, in Mcleod Ganj, India.

== Controversy ==
The Tibetan Olympics 2008 event has aroused some controversy in the Tibetan community and outside of it also. The Tibetan Government-in-exile has dissociated itself from the event. The organiser himself states that the purpose of the event is not political, but "is an initiative to let Tibetans join in the celebration of the spirit of the biggest international sports event."

== See also ==
- Olympic Games
- Team Tibet
