= Miss Tibet =

Beauty contest

Miss Tibet is an annual beauty pageant held in McLeod Ganj, India. It is produced by Lobsang Wangyal Productions.

== History ==
The first-ever Miss Tibet pageant was produced by Lobsang Wangyal in October 2002. The pageant was criticized as "aping western culture" and "un-Tibetan". The pageant has continued yearly since then.

In 2017, Wangyal announced that he would not continue organising the pageant, and could sell it to someone who would carry on its ideals.

In 2002, four Tibetan girls participated in the competition. Four editions of the pageant's 15-year history — 2003, 2005, 2013, and 2014 — featured only a single participant. In 2006, the swimsuit competition was opened to the public.

The Miss Tibet Pageant 2012 was cancelled in response to increased tensions in Tibet and in support of the protests there.

The Dalai Lama considers the pageant unimportant, but it is still held due to popular demand.

Many winners and one contestant have participated in international pageants.

== Miss Tibet 2018 ==
The Miss Tibet Pageant 2018 was held in New York City, US, with one contestant, Tenzin Yonten, who was declared the Miss Tibet 2018.

== Miss Tibet 2017 ==
Tenzin Paldon from Karnataka, India, was crowned Miss Tibet 2017 at the Tibetan Institute of Performing Arts in McLeod Ganj, India, on 4 June 2017. She received Rs. 100,000 (US$2,200). Tenzin Khechoe was judged the first runner-up, receiving Rs. 50,000, and Tenzin Nordron the second runner-up receiving Rs. 25,000. The winner and the first runner-up also won a two-week trip to Vietnam, sponsored by Claire Huynh Hong Hai. The three judges for the event were Tanshuman Gurung, Abhishek Madhukar, and Anshdeep Kaur. Chemi Kyizom also participated in Miss Tibet 2017

At the finale of the event, director Lobsang Wangyal announced his intention to withdraw from organising the pageant, and sell it to someone who would carry it on with the same objectives.

=== List of Contestants ===
See Full 2017 contestant information

== Miss Tibet 2016 ==
Tenzing Sangnyi was selected as Miss Tibet 2016. She received a cash prize of Rs one lakh (100,000), donated by sponsor Jangchup Nyendak. First runner-up Tenzin Dawa from New York won Rs 50,000, and second runner-up Tenzing Dickey from Bylakuppe received Rs 25,000.

Tenzing Dickey also won the Miss Photogenic vote this year.

=== List of Contestants ===
– Full 2016 contestant information

== Miss Tibet 2015 ==
Pema Choedon from Dehradun was crowned Miss Tibet 2015 at the Tibetan Institute of Performing Arts in McLeod Ganj, India, on 7 June 2015. She received one lakh (100,000.00) Indian rupees (equivalent to US$2,200).

Lobsang Kyizom, 22 years old, was judged the first runner-up. She received Rs 50,000.00. Tsering Dolma, 24, was chosen as the second runner-up. She was given a cheque of Rs 25,000.00.

The pageant was kept low-key and held only one day to express solidarity with victims of the 2015 earthquake in Nepal.

=== List of Contestants ===
Name	Age	Education	Hometown
Lobsang Kyizom	22	Journalism	Kathmandu, Nepal
Pema Choedon	24	Master's degree from JNU	Dehra Dun, India
Tsering Dolma	24	Degree in Nursing	Pokhara, Nepal

– Full contestant information

== Miss Tibet 2014 ==
Tenzin Yangzom from Sikkim was selected unopposed as the titleholder of Miss Tibet 2014. She is multi-lingual and likes dancing, basketball, singing, painting and photography. Out of 8 applications received 5 were confirmed, but 4 withdrew at the last minute citing personal reasons.

== Miss Tibet 2013 ==
A coronation ceremony of the Miss Tibet 2013 was held in Bangalore as Tenzing Lhamo from Madison, US, was the only one to come to participate in the pageant. She donated the prize money of Rs 100,000 for Tibetan activism. The pageant was originally planned to be held in Bylakuppe, Karnataka, the largest Tibetan settlement in India.

== Miss Tibet 2012 ==
The Miss Tibet Pageant 2012 was cancelled in response to increased tensions in Tibet and in support of the protests there. The Pageant was to be held in Dharamshala, India, from 8 to 10 June 2012.

== Miss Tibet 2011 ==
Miss Tibet Pageant 2011 was the 10th edition of the annual event. The pageant was held in Dharamshala from 3 to 5 June. Tenzin Yangkyi was selected by the judges as Miss Tibet 2011. She represented Tibet in the Miss Asia Pacific World 2011 beauty pageant.

=== Controversy/Accusations of fraud ===
On 5 June 2012 Australian Broadcasting Corporation's Foreign Correspondent program aired a report which had followed contestants preparing for and undertaking the Miss Tibet 2011 contest. The report outlined the contestant's understanding of how they would be judged – a judging panel of non-Tibetans would be marking the contestants presentations. At the end of the program controversy erupted when the winner was announced.

One contestant remarked that she thought Tenzin Khecheo would have won. Another stated "I think Lobsang Wangyal cheated – he's a fraud." The pageant organiser, Lobsang Wangyal, was confronted by the contestants who wanted to know how the judging had been processed. At first Lobsang Wangyal claimed the marking sheets had been stolen. "I don't have the judges' sheet. It was stolen ... on the night. ... It's not in the file. The file is empty. ... When I went onstage somebody stole it. I too was surprised." The contestants then pressed Lobsang Wangyal further, at which point he admitted the non-Tibetan judge's markings only affected 25% of the overall evaluation – that he himself controlled the remaining 75% of the marking, and as such, had effectively decided by himself which contestant had won. The confrontation then ended with the contestants walking out and stating to Lobsang Wangyal "You are a fraud." To which Lobsang Wangyal responded "Yeah ... yeah I am."

Lobsang Wangyal then made a follow-up statement to the camera saying "Miss Tibet should be someone who should be calm and, you know ... listen and ... be respectful and see ... if this is how Miss Tibetan will be ... oh my god ... no way."

The report then finished with a comment from Ngodop Dolma: "When I look back into Miss Tibet what I've come to realise is that Lobsang's Miss Tibet does not empower Tibetan women but it does the opposite. It actually disempowers Tibetan women. So, I believe the only way it could have any values is if it were run by a woman."

==== Director Lobsang Wangyal's response ====
Lobsang Wangyal responded a few months after the report was made through a posting on misstibet.com in which he says that Mr Gould's recruited contestant Ngodup Dolma made the accusation only after she was unsuccessful in the contest. In his statement Lobsang accepted that the folder containing the mark sheets of the finale night had been stolen after the coronation, and suggested that Mr Gould or an accomplice was involved.

=== List of Contestants ===
Name	Age	Education	Hometown
Chemi Lhazom	25	MBA	Delhi, India
Dolma Tsering	25	Bachelor of Computer Science	Bangalore, India
Ngodup Dolma	25	Bachelor of Nursing	Australia
Tenzin Khecheo	20	In college	Minnesota, United States
Tenzin Sangmo	25	Bachelor of Commerce	Dharamshala, India
Tenzin Yangkyi	17	Class X	Zurich, Switzerland

– Full contestant information

== Miss Tibet 2010 ==
Tenzin Norzom from Varanasi, holder of a Shastri degree (equivalent to Bachelor of Arts in Buddhist Philosophy), was crowned Miss Tibet 2010 at the Tibetan Institute of Performing Arts in McLeod Ganj, India, on 6 June 2010. She received one lakh (100,000.00) Indian rupees (equivalent to US$2,200). After the crowning, Norzom said she would use the title to promote the Tibetan cause.

Yangchen Metok, a 19-year-old girl who had escaped to India in 2008, was judged the first runner-up. She received Rs 50,000.00. Rinchen Choden, a 25-year-old hair stylist from Bangalore, was chosen as the second runner-up. She was given a cheque of Rs 25,000.00. The fourth place Tenzin Namchoe from Golok, Tibet, was given a token prize of Rs 10,000.

Considering the Kyigudo earthquake in eastern Tibet in April, the pageant was kept low-profile. No firecrackers were set off, but instead a short prayer session was held at the opening of the show. Lobsang Wangyal, the director and the producer of the event, gave Rs.10,000 in donation to the victims of the earthquake.

Kingfisher, a leading Indian brand, sponsored the pageant.

=== List of Contestants ===
Name	Age	Education	Hometown
Rinchen Choden	25	Bachelor of Commerce	Tawang, India
Tenzin Namchoe	22	Bachelor of Social Work	Lhasa, China
Tenzin Norzom	24	Shastri degree (= Bachelor of Arts)	Hunsur, India
Yangchen Metok	19	Class VIII	Golok, China

== Miss Tibet 2009 ==
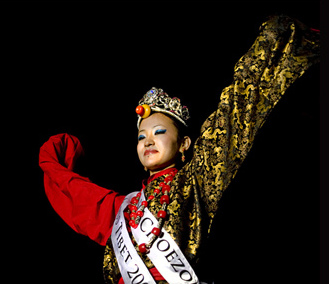
Tenzin Choezom, Miss Tibet 2009

Miss Tibet 2009 was held from 16–18 June 2009. The finale was held on 7 June at Tipa. The four participants arrived in McLeod Ganj on 28 May. A week's training was given from 29 May, until 4 June. The first round — the swim suit round — of the Miss Tibet pageant 2009 was held on 5 June. Two more rounds — talk and talent rounds — was held on 6 June. The remaining four rounds — introduction, evening gown, traditional costume and interview rounds — were held on 7 June at Tipa.

Thousands in the audience witnessed the crowning of Tenzin Choezom as the new Miss Tibet. Dr BK Modi, the Chairman of the Spice Corp, crowned the winner. He also presented a scholarship cheque of one lakh rupees (Rs 100,000) to Choezom. Ngawang Choying was picked the first runner-up and Dolkar the second runner-up by a four-member jury. Ngawang and Dolkar received scholarship cheques of Rs 50,000 and Rs 25,000 respectively. Yeshi was presented a consolation prize of Rs 5,000.

=== List of Contestants ===
Name	Age	Education	Hometown
Dolkar	24	Graduate	Dehra Dun, India
Ngawang Choying	18	School	Darjeeling, India
Tenzin Choezom	20	College	Dharamshala, India
Yeshi Lhamo	24	Diploma in nursing	Delhi, India

== Miss Tibet 2008 ==
Miss Tibet Pageant 2008 was held on Sunday 12 October 2008 at The Tibetan Institute of Performing Arts (TIPA), Dharamshala, India. Two young women competed for the crown — Sonam Choedon, who came from Tibet to India in June 2008, and Jamyang Chentso, born in India Sonam Choedon won the title.

Sonam Choedon is a student. She is currently learning languages: English and Hindi. She is fluent in Tibetan and Chinese.

=== List of Contestants ===
Name	Age	Education	Hometown
Jamyang Chentso	22	High School	Kham, tibet
Sonam Choedon	18	High School	Darjeeling, India

== Miss Tibet 2007 ==
Miss Tibet Pageant 2007 was held from 12 to 14 October 2007 in McLeod Ganj, Dharamshala, India. Five young Tibetan women took part in the pageant. Tenzin Dolma from McLeod Ganj was crowned Miss Tibet 2007. She received a scholarship cheque of Rs 100,000 (US$2,500). She represented Tibet in the Miss Earth 2007 pageant in the Philippines in November 2007.

Tsering Yangzom from Kollegal Tibetan settlement, south India, was the First runner-up. She received Rs 50,000 in scholarship. She was also the "Miss Photogenic", receiving 1170 of the 3156 votes cast online at misstibet.com.

Deeki Dolma from Gangtok, Sikkim, was declared the Second runner-up. She received Rs 25,000.

=== List of Contestants ===
Name	Age	Education	Hometown
Deeki Dolma	20	College	Sikkim, India
Tenzin Dolma	21	College	Dharamshala, India
Tenzin Pema	19	B.A.	Dehra Dun, India
Tenzing Dolma	25	MBA	Sikkim, India
Tsering Yangzom	20	College	Karnataka, India

== Summary of Winners ==
Year	Winner	1st Runner Up	2nd Runner Up	Winner origin	Remark
2015	Pema Choedon	Lobsang Kyizom	Tsering Dolma	Dehra Dun, India	The glamour parts of the event, with no fire crackers as well as no new suit for the Director, were left out to express solidarity with the Nepal earthquake victims. History 2015
2014	Tenzin Yangzom	n/a	n/a	Gangtok, Sikkim	There were four contestants, but only one arrived for the Pageant. History 2014
2013	Tenzing Lhamo	n/a	n/a	Madison, US	Only one contestant this year. The event took place in Bangalore, India. History 2013
2012	n/a	n/a	n/a	n/a	Cancelled to stand in solidarity with all the Tibetans in Tibet and honour those who have died. History 2012
2011	Tenzin Yangkyi	Ngodup Dolma	Dolma Tsering	Zurich, Switzerland	Tenzin Yangkyi is a high school student in Zurich, Switzerland. She intends to become a professional model. History 2011
2010	Tenzin Norzom	Yangchen Metok	Rinchen Choden	Varanasi, India	Tenzin Norzom holds a Shastri Degree. She was born in Hunsur Tibetan settlement in South India. History 2010
2009	Tenzin Choezom	Ngawang Choying	Dolkar	Dharamshala, India	Tenzin Choezom is from Suja, near Bir in Himachal Pradesh. She has completed class XII, and is now doing a computer course. History 2009
2008	Sonam Choedon	Jamyang Chentso	n/a	Kham, Tibet	In 2008, there were only two contestants, and hence there was no 2nd runner-up. Sonam Choedon didn't compete in any international pageant. Sonam Choedon is in Bylakuppe in South India, studying English and Buddhist philosophy. History 2008
2007	Tenzin Dolma	Tsering Yangzom	Deeki Dolma	Dharamshala, India	Miss Earth Pageant 2007, The Philippines History 2007
2006	Tsering Chungtak	Wangchuk Palmo	Tseten Yangzom	Shillong, India	Miss Earth Pageant 2006, The Philippines Miss Tourism Pageant 2007, Malaysia History 2006 "The 31-year old former Miss Tibet was pursuing her PhD in Sociology from Jawaharlal Nehru University (JNU) but had to leave her studies in between owing to her poor health." She died 21 July 2016.
2005	Tenzin Nyima	n/a	n/a	Bylakuppe, India	The 2005 Pageant had only one contestant. History 2005
2004	Tashi Yangchen			Gangtok, Sikkim	Expelled: Miss Tourism World Pageant Zimbabwe, due to pressure from China History 2004
2003	Tsering Kyi	n/a	n/a	Amdo, Tibet	The 2005 Pageant had only one contestant. Tsering Kyi met Prince Charles in New Delhi India, October 2003 History 2003
2002	Dolma Tsering	n/a	n/a	Minyak, Tibet	Participant: Miss Tourism Intercontinental Pageant 2003, Malaysia Winner: Best National Costume, Queen of Tourism International 2003, Mexico History 2002

== Participation in International Pageants ==
Many winners and one contestant have participated in international pageants.

The first Miss Tibet, in 2002, Dolma Tsering, has competed in two international pageants. She also won the Miss Goodwill subsidiary title from the pageant in Malaysia and the Best National Costume from another pageant in Mexico.

Name	Pageant	Country	Year	Remarks
Tenzing Yonten; Miss Tibet 2018	Miss Global	Philippines	2018	
Tenzin Paldon; Miss Tibet 2017	Miss Global	Cambodia	2017	
Tenzing Sangnyi; Miss Tibet 2016	Miss Global	Philippines	2016	
Pema Choedon; Miss Tibet 2015	Miss Global	Philippines	2015	
Tenzin Yangkyi; Miss Tibet 2011	Miss Asia Pacific	South Korea	2011	Wore a "Swiss Tibet" sash after interference from China government.
Tenzin Dolma; Miss Tibet 2007	Miss Earth	Philippines	2007	Refused pressure from China to wear "Tibet-China" sash, and was allowed by organisers to go ahead with the "Miss Tibet" sash.
Tsering Chungtak; Miss Tibet 2006	Miss Tourism	Malaysia	2007	Withdrew under pressure from China
Tsering Chungtak Miss Tibet 2006	Miss Earth	Philippines	2006	
Tashi Yangchen; Miss Tibet 2004	Miss Tourism World	Zimbabwe	2005	Withdrew under pressure from China
Tenzin Diki; Contestant 2002	Miss Tourism World	Venezuela	2003	
Dolma Tsering; Miss Tibet 2002	Queen of Tourism International	Mexico	2003	Best National Costume Award
Dolma Tsering; Miss Tibet 2002	Miss Tourism Intercontinental	Malaysia	2003	Miss Goodwill Award

– Full international pageant information

=== Interference from Chinese government ===
The Chinese government has tried to interfere, pressuring international directors to name Miss Tibet as "Miss Tibet-China". Two Miss Tibets had to withdraw from international pageants — Zimbabwe and Malaysia — after they were asked to wear sashes with this title, and refused.

Miss Tibet 2007 Tenzin Dolma was asked to wear such a sash in the Philippines at the last minute, but she refused, and was allowed to go ahead with the "Miss Tibet" sash.

Miss Tibet 2006 Tsering Chungtak withdrew from the Miss Tourism Pageant in Malaysia after Chinese government representatives pressured the organiser to enter her as "Miss Tibet-China" in November 2007.

Miss Tibet 2004 Tashi Yangchen had to withdraw from a pageant in Zimbabwe after the Chinese embassy in Harare, the capital of Zimbabwe, in a similar case of Chinese interference, asked her to wear a "Miss Tibet-China" sash in February 2005.

In October 2011, Tenzin Yangkyi, Miss Tibet 2011, was sent to the Miss Asia Pacific World 2011 beauty pageant, held in Daegu, Seoul, and Busan in South Korea. During the pageant, Yangkyi received pressure from the Chinese government to wear a sash saying "Tibet-China", but she refused. Instead, she decided to change the sash name to "Swiss Tibet", as she is a Swiss citizen.

== External links and references ==
- Little Lhasa: Reflections on Exiled Tibet, by Tsering Namgyal. Chapter 5, "Miss Tibet", pp. 65–77.
- Lobsang Wangyal Productions
- Miss Earth Pageant
- Miss Himalaya Pageant
- Miss Tibet Pageant
