= Tibetan Music Awards =

Indian music award held every two years

- Current: Tibetan Music Awards of 2013
- Country: India
- First award: 2003
- Website: musictibet.com and Awards

Tibetan Music Awards were founded in 2003 by Lobsang Wangyal and are held every two years in Dharamshala, in northern India. Winners are chosen through online voting.

In 2003, Techung won the best modern and traditional music award. Rangzen Shonu won "Best Album".

In 2005, Ama Dachung, an 81-year-old Tibetan artist, received the award for her lifetime work for Tibetan music.

In 2007, a special recognition award was given to Nawang Khechog for his album "Tibetan Meditation Music". Namgyal Lhamo won the Best Female Artist. Amalia Rubin won the Best International Artist for Tibet her album of Tibetan folk songs.

In 2009, Chthonic was named "Best International Artist".

Tibetan Music Awards 2013 were held on 12 October 2013, in Dharamsala.
