= Nancy Hennings =

American musician

Nancy Hennings is an American musician who teamed up with Henry Wolff to make the album Tibetan Bells in 1971, one of the pioneering LPs of new-age music. In 1982, with the assistance of Wolff and Grateful Dead drummer Mickey Hart, she produced the mysterious sounding Yamantaka. She also contributed to the other Tibetan Bells albums Tibetan Bells II, Tibetan Bells III and The Bells of Sha'ng Shu'ng.
