= Tibetan Bells (album) =

Studio album by Henry Wolff and Nancy Hennings
- Released: 1972
- Genre: New-age, drone
- Label: Island

Professional ratings
Review scores
Source	Rating
Allmusic	4.5/5 stars

Tibetan Bells is a 1972 album by Henry Wolff and Nancy Hennings. It was the first recording to use Tibetan bells and singing bowls, and helped establish some of the fundamentals of new-age music.

== Track listing ==
1. "Khumbu Ice-Fall" performed by Wolff / Hennings – 2:23
2. "Rainbow Light" performed by Wolff / Hennings – 1:22
3. "White Light" performed by Wolff / Hennings – 2:15
4. "From the Roof of the World You Can See..." performed by Wolff / Hennings – 1:18
5. "From the Roof of the World You Can See..." performed by Wolff / Hennings – 0:39
6. "From the Roof of the World You Can See..." performed by Wolff / Hennings – 2:36
7. "Wrathful Deity/Clear Light/A Choir of..." performed by Wolff / Hennings – 24:21
