= Tibet Post =

Online publication focused on Tibet

- Founded: 2007; 19 years ago
- Website: www.thetibetpost.com

The Tibet Post is an online publication founded by a group of Tibetan journalists with the primary goal of promoting democracy through freedom of expression within Tibetan communities who are both within and outside of Tibet.

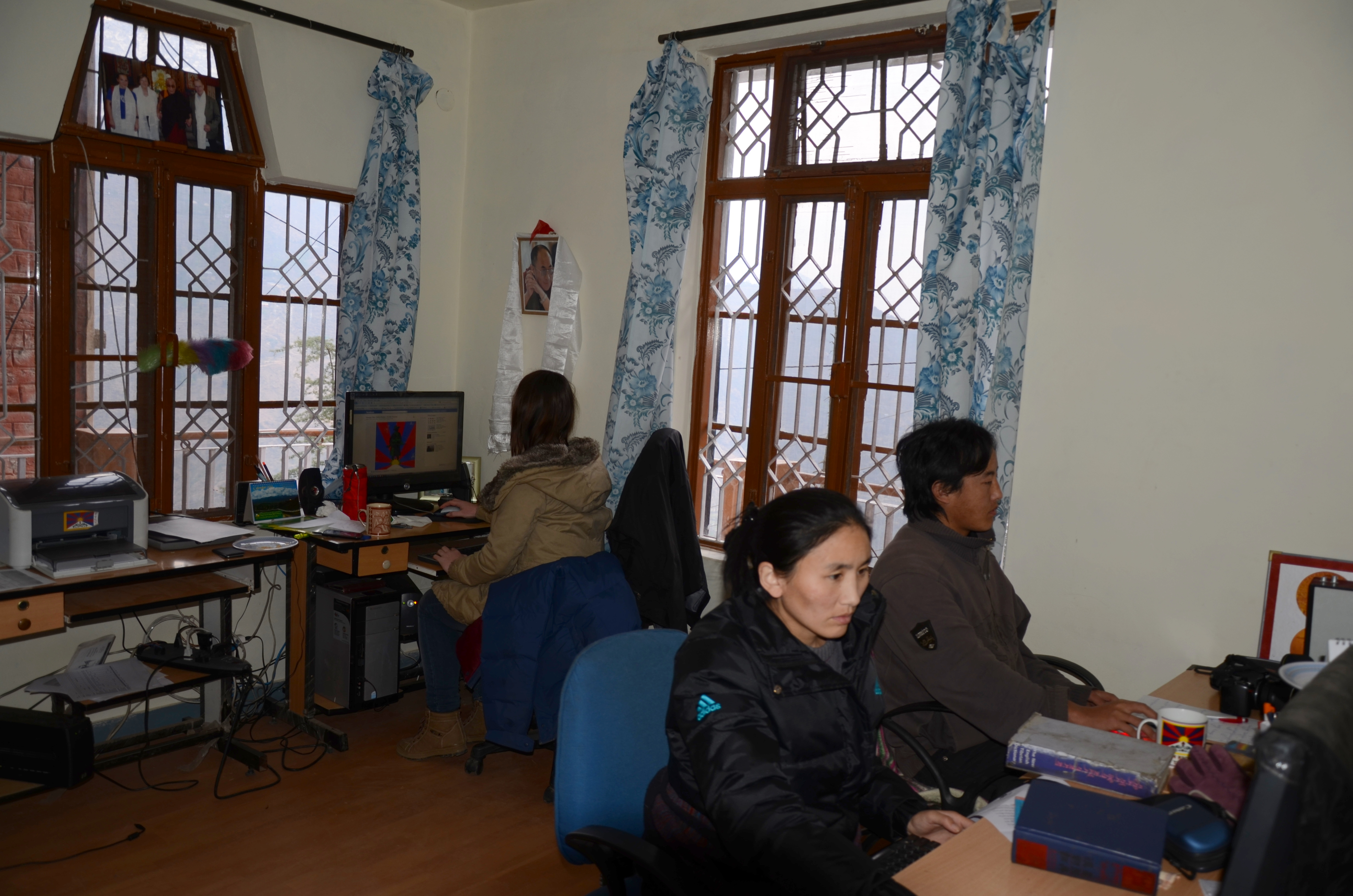
The Tibet Post Office Dharamsala

Created on December 10, 2007 in the Tibetan exile community of Dharamsala in the Himalayan region of Northern India, it was the first independent trilingual daily online newspaper-in-exile, publishing in English, Tibetan, and Mandarin. It is also the only one in existence. The publication has celebrated a readership of nearly 10 million per year since 2017 and maintains a general readership of between 500 and 10,000 online.

== Circulation ==
The publication's website is considered a strong force in the Tibetan community and represents people in Tibet and Tibetan people's voices reaching the outside world, promoting peaceful interaction between Tibetans and Chinese. It acts as a free news source that reaches and informs many in the remote community. The Tibet Post-publication has been heralded as a strong force in educating Chinese seeking objective viewpoints on the situation in Tibet. According to its website cPanel and Google analysis, an estimated 60% of its readers are thought to be logging on from inside China, giving it the largest readership of any Tibetan news source-in-exile and making it the only one claiming a majority of Chinese readers.

Subjects such as human rights, censorship, and the Tibetan cause in China are the driving forces behind the non-profit organization, 'Himalayan Literacy Trust' (HLT), by whom it was created. The HLT is part of an affiliation that also includes Reporters Without Borders (RSF), the international freedom of press watchdog organizations in and outside of India, with a focus on the 'very serious' situation regarding freedom of expression in China and Tibet.
