= List of conga players =

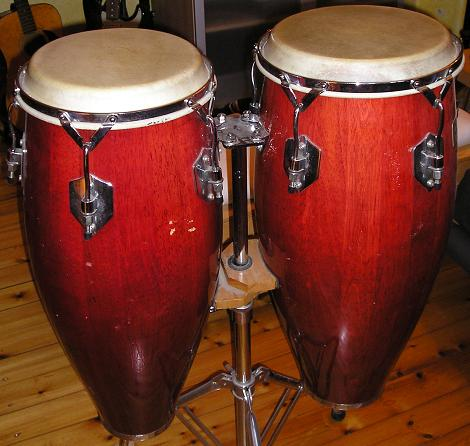
A pair of congas

Conga players perform on a tall, narrow, single-headed Cuban drum of African origin called the Tumbadora, or the Conga as it is internationally known. It is probably derived from the Congolese Makuta drums or Sikulu drums commonly played in Mbanza Ngungu, Congo.

Originally a person who plays tumbadoras is called a "tumbador" but ever since they began using the name "conga", a man who plays conga is called a "conguero" and a woman who plays conga is called "conguera". Other common terms are "timbero" and "timbera", or "rumbero" and "rumbera" if one plays congas in rumba setting.

Although ultimately derived from African drums made from hollowed logs, the Cuban conga can be staved from ribs like a barrel, or shaped from one solid piece like a hollowed log. Some are now made from fiberglass or other synthetic materials.

Congas were originally made from salvaged rum or wine barrels and locally available animal skins. Modern congas may have synthetic (or hybrid fiber-plastic) or natural skins.

They were used both in Afro-Caribbean religious music and as the principal instrument in Rumba. Congas are now very common in Latin American music, including salsa music, as well as many other forms of American popular music.

Originally it was played only using one drum; now it is common to see two, three, or four drums. Some congueros such as Giovanni Hidalgo play up to six or seven drums.

== Cuban ==
- Chano Pozo
- Carlos Vidal Bolado
- Miguelito Valdés
- Carlos "Patato" Valdes
- Tata Güines
- Armando Peraza
- Candido Camero
- Julito Collazo
- Luis Abreu
- Los Muñequitos de Matanzas
- Mongo Santamaría
- Francisco Aguabella
- Pancho Quinto
- José Luis "Changuito" Quintana
- Miguel "Angá" Díaz
- Luis Conte
- Eliel Lazo
- Roberto Vizcaíno
- Mauricio Herrera

== Cuban American ==
- Desi Arnaz
- Fermin Goytisolo
- Walfredo Reyes, Jr.
- Daniel de los Reyes

== Puerto Rican ==
- Ray Barretto
- Joe Cuba
- Milton Cardona
- Jerry González
- Ray Mantilla
- Marc Quiñones
- Lenny Castro
- Michael Carabello
- Frank Colón
- Eddie Montalvo
- Marcel Rodriguez-Lopez
- Roger Dawson
- John Santos
- Sammy Figueroa
- Giovanni Hidalgo

== British ==
- Ray Cooper

== African American ==
- Papa Dee Allen
- Eddie "Bongo" Brown
- Eric "Bobo" Correa
- "Master" Henry Gibson
- Philip Bailey
- Bobbye Hall Porter

== Mexican American ==
- Pete Escovedo
- Sheila E.
- Marcos Reyes
- Poncho Sanchez

== Italian American ==
- Jack Costanzo
- Joe Lala

== American ==
- Bob Conti
- Raul Rekow
- Michael Spiro

== Peruvian ==
- Alex Acuña
- Tony Succar

== Brazilian ==
- Rubens Bassini
- Paulinho da Costa
- Laudir de Oliveira
- Guilherme Franco

== Haitian ==
- Ti Roro

== Italian ==
- Tony Esposito

== Danish ==
- Safri Duo

== See also ==
- Lists of musicians
