= Kiss Me Once =

2014 album by Kylie Minogue

Studio album by Kylie Minogue
- Released: 14 March 2014
- Recorded: 2012–2013
- Studios: Glenwood (Burbank, CA); Cutfather (Copenhagen, Denmark); The Chocolate Factory (London, UK); Metrophonic (London, UK); Metropolis (London, UK); Rinse (London, UK); Subcoustic (London, UK); Conway (Los Angeles, CA); Echo (Los Angeles, CA); Heavy Duty (Los Angeles, CA); Pulse (Los Angeles, CA); South Point (Miami, FL); Westlake (Santa Monica, CA)
- Genres: Dance-pop; R&B
- Length: 38:46
- Label: Parlophone
- Producers: Cutfather; Daniel Davidsen; Mike Del Rio; GoodWill & MGI; Greg Kurstin; Chris Loco; Mark Taylor; MNEK; The Monsters & the Strangerz; Thomas Olsen; Ariel Rechtshaid; Jesse Shatkin; JD Walker; Peter Wallevik; Pharrell Williams

Kylie Minogue chronology
The Abbey Road Sessions (2012)	Kiss Me Once (2014)	Sleepwalker (2015)

Singles from Kiss Me Once
- 1. "Into the Blue" Released: 27 January 2014; 2. "I Was Gonna Cancel" Released: 12 May 2014

Kiss Me Once is the twelfth studio album by Australian singer Kylie Minogue. It was released on 14 March 2014 by Parlophone, her first musical effort since her 2010 release Aphrodite. After celebrating her 25th career anniversary, Minogue signed with the American agency Roc Nation, which is managed by American rapper and entrepreneur Jay-Z. Intending to create a different musical experience, Minogue and her agency enlisted a variety of producers and collaborators, including musicians Sia, MNEK, Pharrell Williams, and Tom Aspaul.

Musically, Kiss Me Once is a pop album that incorporates elements of dance music, electropop, R&B, dubstep, and disco. The album's lyrics cover a wide range of topics, including love, sex, empowerment, and having fun. Kiss Me Once received mixed-to-positive reviews from music critics, with many praising Minogue's personality and charm throughout the record. However, critics were divided on the album's content, production quality, and lyrics.

Commercially, Kiss Me Once debuted at number one in Australia and number two in the United Kingdom. Despite peaking in the top ten in several markets, sales were below expectations and moderately successful. Kiss Me Once yielded five singles: "Into the Blue", "I Was Gonna Cancel", "Sexercize", "Million Miles", and "Beautiful". The first two served as the album's official releases, performing moderately in commercial markets, while the latter three served as promotional singles.

To promote the album, Minogue went on her Kiss Me Once Tour between September 2014 and March 2015. The tour did well commercially, but concert reviewers gave it mixed reviews. On 23 March 2015, a live recording and video were shot and released. Retrospectively, Kiss Me Once was seen as a misstep in Minogue's career by publications and critics, due to its lack of commercial success and appeal to audiences. After leaving Roc Nation the following year, Minogue expressed reservations about the project.

== Background ==
Minogue began a year-long celebration of her 25 years in the music industry in 2012, which became known as "K25". Her 20-minute medley performance at the Sydney Gay and Lesbian Mardi Gras in front of 15,000 people kicked off the anniversary on March 3. Two weeks later, Minogue embarked on the Anti Tour in Australia and the United Kingdom, which featured B-sides, demos, and rarities from her discography. She released the single "Timebomb" in May, followed by the greatest hits collection The Best of Kylie Minogue in June. In October, Minogue announced two new releases: the compilation album The Abbey Road Sessions, which includes reworked and orchestral versions of her previous songs recorded at London's Abbey Road Studios, and the K25 Time Capsule box set. and the K25 Time Capsule box set that contained 25 mini-CDs.

Following the conclusion of her K25 celebrations, Minogue parted ways with her long-term manager Terry Blamey and his team, announcing a musical hiatus shortly after. She then announced on Instagram and Twitter in February 2013 that she had signed a management contract with American rapper and entrepreneur Jay-Z's imprint Roc Nation. British publications reported on Minogue's involvement with new music, speculating that she had been working with Australian musician Sia, which Minogue confirmed. Minogue told the American magazine Rolling Stone in May 2013 that the album was "bringing out something different... which is cool". She also admitted that she needed to "do something different", but added that the album "will keep the DNA of what a Kylie track is, because I'm on it". I enjoy moving the goalposts and experimenting with different sounds."

== Production and recording sessions ==
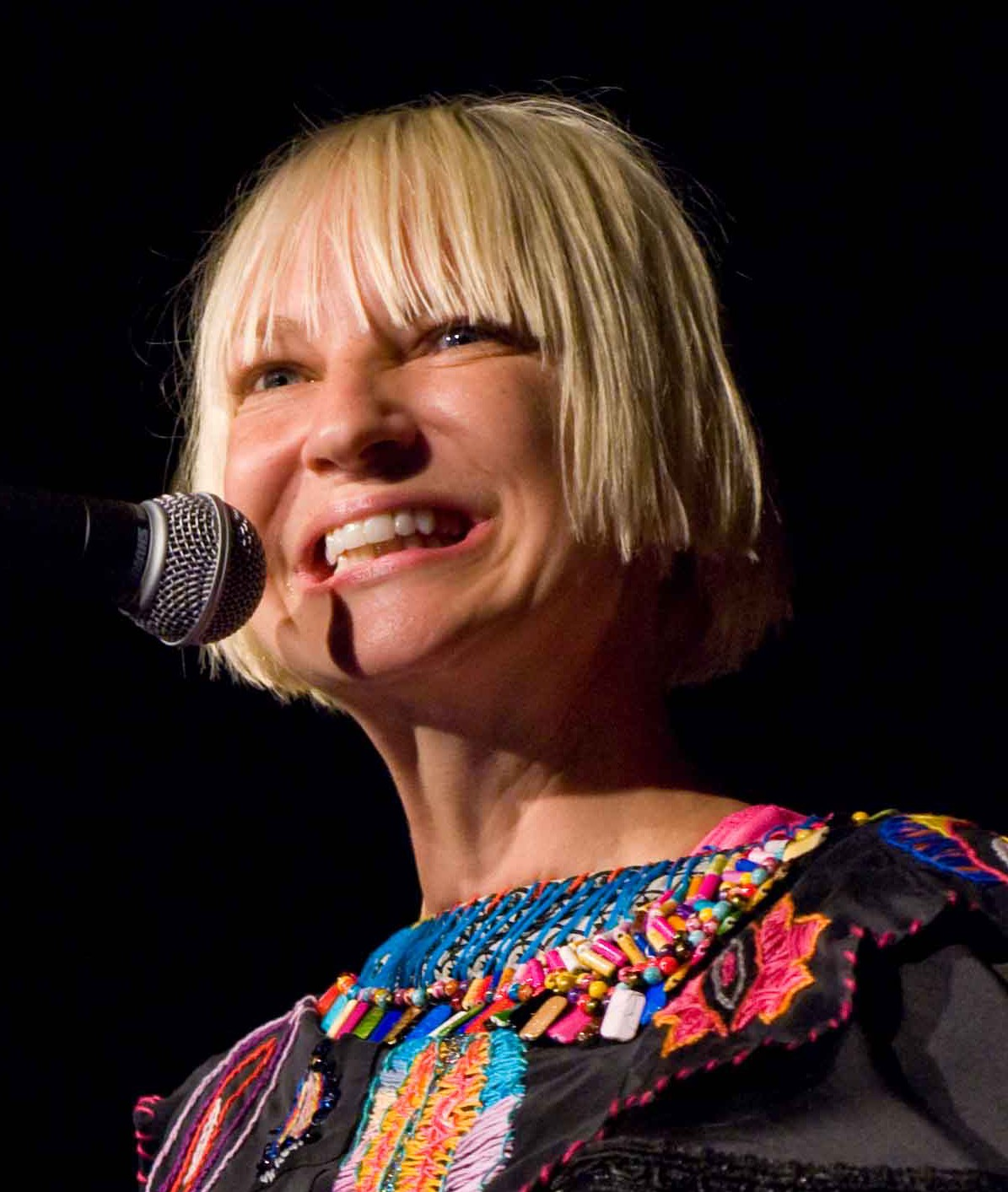
Sia was an executive producer for the album.

Minogue began initial sessions for the album in January 2012 in London and Los Angeles. From March to July, Minogue used Twitter to announce collaborations with Norwegian team Stargate, American producer Darkchild, American rapper Brooke Candy, MNDR, and American musician and producer will.i.am. On May 27, one day before her 45th birthday, Minogue teased an "interesting" collaboration, which was later revealed to be a duet with Spanish singer Enrique Iglesias.

In February 2014, Minogue confirmed Sia as the album's executive co-producer. Minogue stated in an interview with American website Idolator that "I got on with her so well... I asked her if she would executive-produce. I was hoping she would say yes. I didn't know if it was something she had done or was interested in, or if maybe she just preferred writing and doing her own music." That same month, she commented to American Billboard magazine; "I felt like I needed a new landscape, and once you've got your feet on the ground you're raring to go. [...] So far the support has been great, and it's just another part of this amalgamation of 'new' that I had wished for and was struck by."

Minogue further collaborated with a number of songwriters and producers, including Sia, Cutfather, Greg Kurstin, Pharrell Williams, and MNEK. The majority of the album was recorded between Los Angeles and New York City, with additional recording and mixing done in London. In an interview with The Huffington Post, Minogue revealed that she and Sia had recorded several tracks for her previous album Aphrodite that did not make the final cut. Minogue recalled that the number of recordings was divided into "three albums" in "three genres": a "pure pop" album, a "dancy-urban" album, and an "indie" album. She also stated that she and Sia chose songs from each that they felt represented Kiss Me Once at the time. In terms of the recording process, she said, "Compared to my early days, I'm really comfortable in the studio." My leads, backing vocals, and harmonies are all recorded quickly. That makes me feel like a machine."

== Music and content ==
Musically, Kiss Me Once is considered as Minogue's return to contemporary pop music. Tim Sendra, writing for AllMusic, categorised the album as "an intoxicating blend of uptempo dance tracks, funky club cuts, sexy midtempo jams, and the occasional ballad." NME's Ben Cardew noted elements of contemporary R&B and dubstep in some of the tracks, including "Sexercize" and "If Only". Similarly, Kitty Empire from The Observer felt the album was "rooted" with R&B music and incorporated elements of funk, disco, and electronic dance music (EDM). With numerous collaborators helming the record, Minogue only contributed to writing one song on the record, this being "Fine".

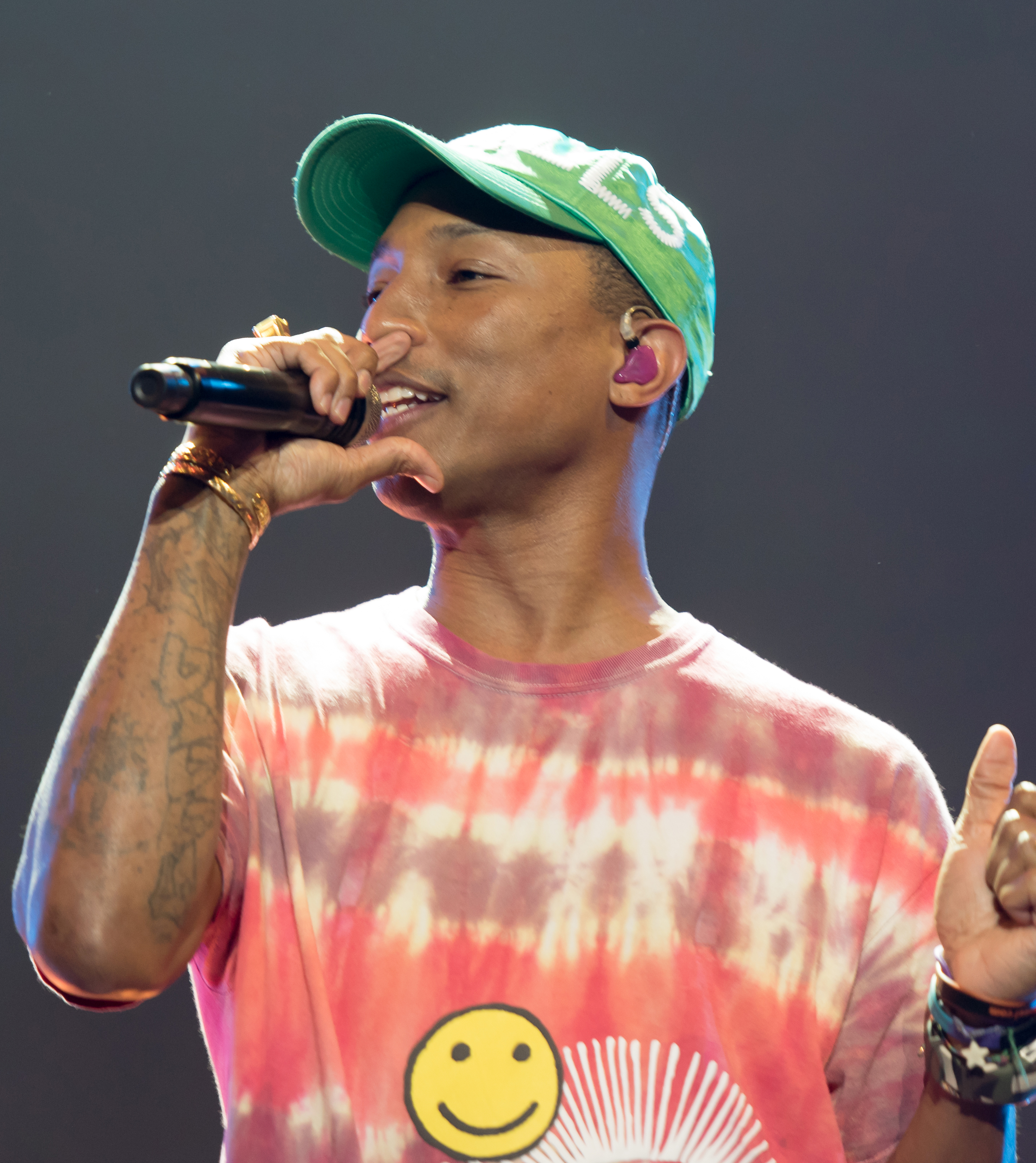
American artist Pharrell Williams helped create two tracks with Minogue, one of them being "I Was Gonna Cancel".

The album begins with "Into the Blue", a euphoric and melancholy-inspired dance-pop track that Minogue describes lyrically as an "escape". The second track, "Million Miles" (also known as "Million Miles Away"), has been described as an electropop song with a strong presence of guitar riffs and keyboard notes, similar to the work of Canadian music Dragonette. "I Was Gonna Cancel", the third track on the album, came about when she "burst into tears" during a recording session with American producer Pharrell Williams; Williams then composed the track inspired by Minogue's moment. Musically, it is an electro-funk track that was compared to Minogue's work from Body Language (2003). "Sexy Love" was the first of three tracks on the album to represent sex, a recurring theme on the album; it is a disco-pop anthem that was compared to Minogue's 2008 single "Wow". "Sexercize", the album's fifth track, was another sex-inspired track that was noted for its influences of dubstep and brostep. The sixth track, "Feels So Good", is a cover song adapted from Tom Aspaul's demo track "Indiana", which is a mid-tempo electro number.

The seventh track on the album, "If Only", was noted as an R&B track with synths, handclaps, and a marching rhythm. The eighth song, "Les Sex", was described as a campy electro track that Minogue named her personal favourite from the album. The title track is a midtempo 1980s-inspired pop song that was praised for highlighting Minogue's more "romantic" side. The tenth song on the album is "Beautiful", a duet with Enrique Iglesias; it was recorded in Paris without Minogue having met Iglesias. "Beautiful", the album's only ballad, features an overuse of auto-tune and vocoder throughout both artists' vocal deliveries. The standard album concludes with "Fine", Minogue's only co-written song. "Fine" is described as an empowering anthem that incorporates electro and house music elements throughout its composition. The album's bonus tracks, "Mr. President" and "Sleeping with the Enemy", were described as electro entries; the former, co-written by Minogue, was described as "silly fun", with samples of Marilyn Monroe's "Happy Birthday, Mr. President" speech, and the latter as "dreamy" and "lush".

== Packaging and release ==
The album artwork for Kiss Me Once was shot by English fashion stylist William Baker. Minogue revealed the album title and cover artwork on 24 January 2014, after a week of teasing on social media. Minogue closes her eyes and purses her red lips for a kiss in the artwork, and was photographed close-up behind a sheet of wet glass. In a 2014 Reddit AMA, Minogue says the "water represents tears, tears of joy, tears of happiness" and says "the album is so much about new beginnings." Robbie Daw of Idolator described it as "warm, colourful, and perfectly pop, while Mike Was off the same publication felt it leaves a strong visual impression and indicates Minogue has "really brought her inner-sex kitten" for the album. Seamus Duff of Metro viewed the artwork as a "silent plea to America to open the window and let her in".

Kiss Me Once was made available for streaming in full on The Guardian's official website on March 10, a week before its UK release. Warner Music Group released the album for the first time on 14 March in Australia, New Zealand, and Germany. Three days later, the album was released in Europe and the United Kingdom in two versions: an 11-track standard version and a deluxe version with two bonus tracks, "Mr. President" and "Sleeping with the Enemy". Kiss Me Once was released in North America on 18 March, and in Japan a day later, with two bonus tracks: "Sparks" and a remix of "Into the Blue" by Japanese musician Yasutaka Nakata.

On 17 May, a special double-12-inch vinyl was released in Europe, complete with a bonus digital download code. Minogue's website also packaged a limited edition box set that included each physical format, a large cover art print, additional visual prints, a transparent glass screen that resembled the album cover, and stickers. On 8 December 2014, Parlophone and Warner Music Group re-released the album on the iTunes Store, including several live performances featuring Minogue at the iTunes Festival. In South Africa, "Sexy Love" is renamed "Love", "Sexercize" is renamed "Exercize", and "Les Sex" is renamed "We Could Call It".

== Promotion ==
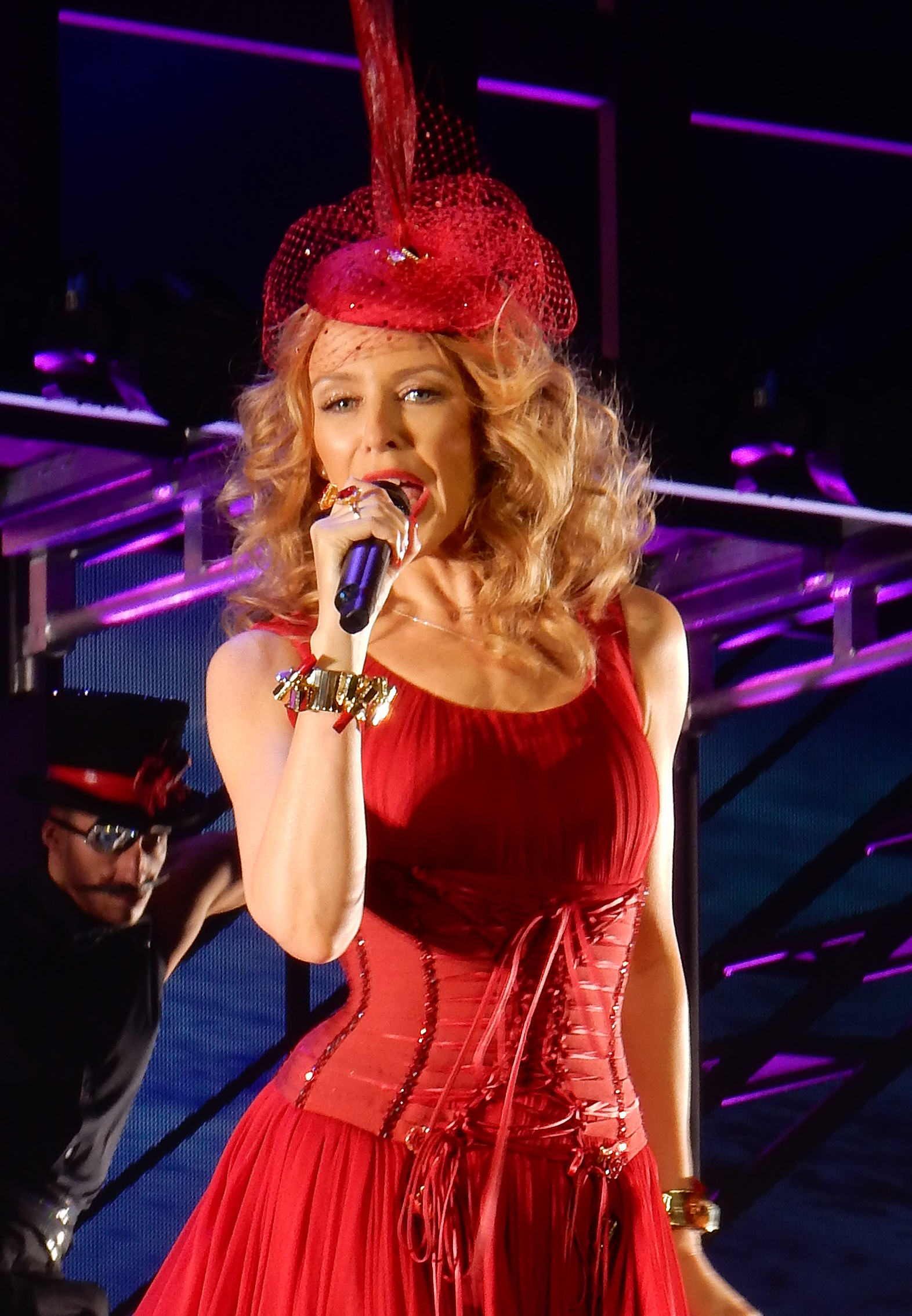
Minogue performing "Timebomb" during the Kiss Me Once Tour in 2014

On 13 February 2014, Minogue gave a surprise live performance of "Into the Blue" and "Les Sex" at the Old Blue Last Pub in Shoreditch. Four days later, she released an album-sampler video of 11 standard tracks on YouTube, featuring 50-second snippets of each song. In March, she performed "Into the Blue" on several television programs in the UK, including the semi-final episode of The Voice UK and the fundraising event Sport Relief 2014. Two intimate concert shows were held in London (18 March) and Melbourne (25 April), where Minogue performed several tracks from Kiss Me Once. She went on to perform "I Was Gonna Cancel" at the 2014 Logie Awards, her first appearance at the award show in 25 years. Minogue was accused of lip-syncing to the performance, which she later denied a day later.

In August, Minogue performed a seven-song set at the 2014 Commonwealth Games closing ceremony, among them were "Into the Blue" and "Beautiful". The ceremony was watched by an average of 6.8 million viewers. Streaming platform Amazon Music reported a 669% sales increase for Kiss Me Once within 24 hours after the show. She embarked the Kiss Me Once Tour in Liverpool in September 2014. The concert tour travelled through the United Kingdom, Europe and Australia. The staging of the tour was inspired by detailed geometry and Bauhaus aesthetics. The concert tour achieved $17 million throughout ticket sales in Europe, and an additional $4 million throughout Australia. An accompanying live album and concert DVD was released on 23 March 2015, which was shot in Glasgow, Scotland in November 2014. Minogue's performance on 27 September, as a part of 2014 iTunes Festival, was streamed live and made available on the iTunes Store for a limited time.

=== Singles ===
The first commercial release was "Into The Blue", which was released on 27 January 2014 by Parlophone. The album's bonus track "Sparks" was included on the physical formats. The song received positive reviews from critics who praised the track's production standards and songwriting but were split on whether it was the best choice for a single release. The single peaked at 46 in Australia and 14 in the United Kingdom. It performed moderately elsewhere, peaking in the top ten in countries such as Japan, Ireland, Hungary, and Scotland, while topping the Hot Dance Club Songs chart in the United States. Dawn Shadforth directed the "Into the Blue" music video, which starred French actor Clément Sibony as Minogue's love interest.

"I Was Gonna Cancel" was selected as the album's second and final single, which was released on 12 May 2014. It received positive feedback for its unique sound upon release, but critics felt it lacked Minogue's personality and criticised the songwriting. Commercially, it charted only in Belgium, Scotland, the United Kingdom, and the Hot Dance Club Songs chart in the United States. The video, which shows Minogue standing in the middle of a crowded street, sparked controversy after several dancers claimed they were not paid for the 11-hour shoot; Minogue and video director Dimitri Basil later denied these claims.

"Sexercize" was the album's only promotional track, released alongside the album. Music critics were divided on the track; some praised Minogue's attempt at another sound, while others were ambivalent about the track's production, sound, and songwriting. Some critics even considered it to be among Minogue's worst work. The single's music video, which features Minogue in a gymnasium performing the song, also received mixed commentary for its sexual nature.

Three of the album's songs, "Sexy Love", "Million Miles", and "Beautiful", were served as radio singles in various regions. "Sexy Love" was released as a promotional track in Australia in June 2014, "Million Miles" was served to Italian radio formats, and "Beautiful" was released via airplay on 15 February 2014 in the UK, and later received a separate digital release on 14 March that same year.

=== Additional releases ===
Other songs released throughout the campaign for Kiss Me Once were considered for the album but were later dropped. Minogue released "Skirt" on her SoundCloud on 28 May 2013. She revealed it to be a buzz single after its release, and it did not appear on any edition of Kiss Me Once. It was re-released as a digital EP on the iTunes Store in June. That month, Nowness released an accompanying lyric video with over 1,000 still photos of Minogue posing in a hotel room. "Crystallize", another track did not make the final track listing, was released as a charity single for the fundraising campaign One Note For Cancer on 26 May 2014. Originally intended to be included on the Japanese edition of Kiss Me Once, "Golden Boy" was released exclusively on 7" vinyl on 19 April 2014 for Record Store Day.

== Critical reception ==
Professional ratings
Aggregate scores
Source	Rating
AnyDecentMusic?	6.5/10
Metacritic	66/100
Review scores
Source	Rating
AllMusic	3/5 stars
The A.V. Club	C−
Consequence of Sound	C+
The Guardian	3/5 stars
New Zealand Herald	3/5 stars
NME	7/10
PopMatters	7/10
Rolling Stone	3/5 stars
Slant Magazine	4/5 stars
Spin	7/10

Kiss Me Once received mixed-to-positive reviews from music critics. At Metacritic, which assigns a weighted mean rating out of 100 to reviews by music critics, the album received an average score of 66, based on 19 reviews, which indicates "generally favorable reviews". At AnyDecentMusic?, which assigns a weighted mean rating out of 10 to reviews by music critics, the album received an average score of 6.5, based on 27 reviews.

Most critics praised Minogue's charisma and charm throughout the album, with many praising her return to modern pop music. Digital Spy's Robert Copsey called the album a "triumph", labelling it as "among the best albums of her career". The Music's Mac McNaughton described it as "an unabashed shimmering life-raft of sexy fabulousness". Joe Sweeney of Slant Magazine called it "ruthlessly addictive dance music", while Ryan Latham of PopMatters said, "Kiss Me Once isn't a game-changing album, but it should churn out enough hits to keep her on the pop culture radar until her next offering." Tim Sendra wrote for AllMusic that Kiss Me Once is a "glittering, fun, and surprisingly powerful album that's classic Kylie through and through". Ben Cardew of NME said the album proved that "after 26 years in the business, Kylie can still pull off a very modern pop album".

Some critics had mixed feelings about the album's production and sound quality. According to Chris Bosman of Consequence of Sound, the album's second half "is less boisterous, and while it maintains the entrepreneurial spirit, it loses its momentum." Despite describing Minogue's album effort as "playful" and "direct", The A.V. Club editor Annie Zalenski criticised its sound as "unfortunate", and felt it "drained" Minogue's personality and vocals. She later referred to the album as a "disappointing record that tries too hard to mould Minogue into something she's not." The Financial Times' Ludovic Hunter-Tilney concluded, "It's solid and unspectacular, a necessary pretext for a new world tour, where the real action lies for Minogue now." Spin magazine editor Brittany Spanos noted that the album lacked cohesion, but stated "Therein lies the strength of Kiss Me Once: Minogue's ability to turn any contrived situation into something positive, magical, and utterly her own."

Other reviews panned certain album content and Minogue's lack of technical input. Fact magazine's Joe Muggs felt the majority of the album contained too many fillers, citing the songs "Les Sex", "I Was Gonna Cancel", and "Sexercize", but praised the record's production standards. Similarly, Entertainment Weekly writer Adam Markovitz gave it a B rating, but criticised the "sex" tracks. Lydia Jenkins of the New Zealand Herald felt the majority of the content was unoriginal, highlighting "Into the Blue" as "half-decent", "Million Miles" and "Fine" as "club fillers", and "Sexy Love" as a rip-off of the song "California Gurls" by American singer Katy Perry. Kevin Ritchie of Now Toronto labelled the album "bad", criticising the second half of the record. Neil McCormick from The Telegraph complimented Minogue's charm and overall sound, but criticised her lack of innovation through the production and songwriting field. MusicOMH's Philip Matusavage gave it a negative review, saying "It's crushingly disappointing, then, to find that Kiss Me Once is perhaps her most anonymous offering to date."

Based on the average shares and reactions on Metacritic, Kiss Me Once was ranked as the 47th most discussed album of 2014. Similarly, it appeared at number 6 on American website Idolator's Best Album of 2014 reader's poll. According to the editor Eduardo Lima, he said "Kylie. Kiss Me Once. The best pop album. I just can´t get enough of it."

== Commercial performance ==
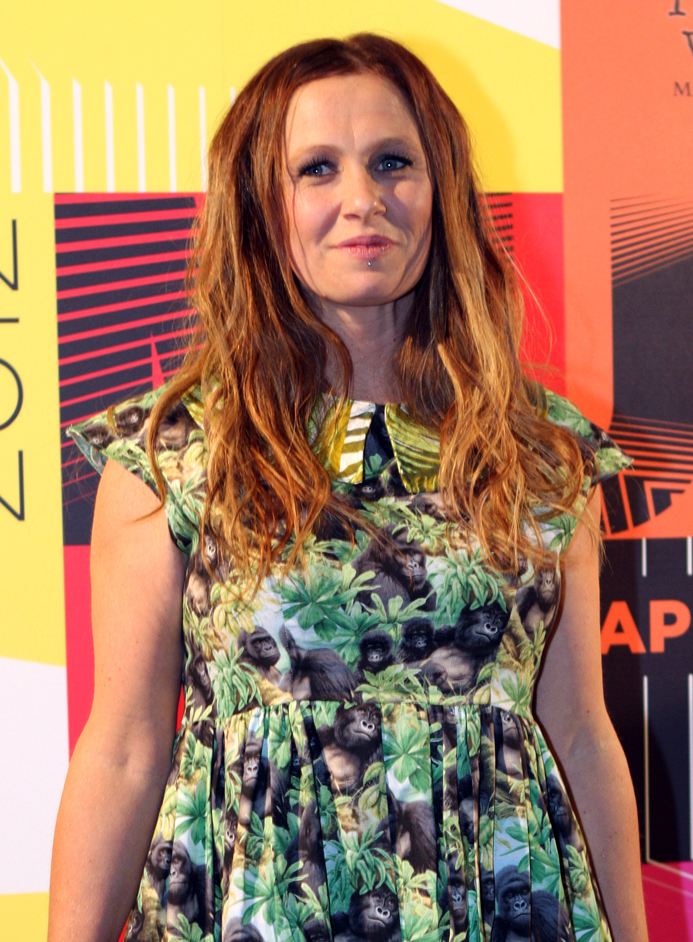
In Australia, Minogue tied with Kasey Chambers for the most number-one albums among female Australian artists.

Kiss Me Once debuted atop of the Australian Albums Chart with 8,166 copies sold. It was Minogue's first number-one album since X (2007) and her fourth overall, tying with country musician Kasey Chambers for the most number-one albums achieved by a female Australian artist. The album slipped to number six the following week with 2,261 units sold, bringing the two week total to 10,247 copies. After falling for five weeks, the album rose to number 27 in its sixth and final charting week, Minogue's shortest run for a studio album since Let's Get to It (1991). The album sold approximately 15,000 copies in Australia by May 2014. In New Zealand, it spent a sole week at number 13, marking Minogue's sixth top 20 entry on the New Zealand Albums Chart.

In the UK, the album faced competition against George Michael's live album Symphonica for the top position. On the chart published on 23 March, Kiss Me Once opened at number two on the UK Albums Chart with 29,251 copies sold, marking Minogue's eleventh top five entry. The album slipped to number eight the following week, before falling out of the top 10 in the third week. Kiss Me Once spent a total of 12 weeks inside the top 100 chart, and placed at number 93 on the UK album year-end chart in 2014. It was certified silver by the British Phonographic Industry (BPI) on 23 May 2014 for sales exceeding 60,000 units, shifting 90,884 units in the UK by October 2020. Kiss Me Once also peaked on two other regional music charts compiled by the Official Charts Company, the Scottish Albums Chart and the Irish Albums Chart, at number three and number four, respectively.

In the United States, the album opened modestly at number 31 on the Billboard 200 with first-week sales of 12,000 copies. That week, Kiss Me Once also debuted at number three on the US Dance/Electronic Albums and at number 26 on the Tastemaker Albums chart. The album peaked at number 15 on the Canadian Albums Chart, Minogue's third album to chart in the territory. In Japan, it debuted at number 40 on the Oricon Albums Chart, selling 3,088 units in its first week and marking her eighth top 40 entry. The album stayed on the chart for a total of 8 weeks. In South Korea, the album peaked at number 96 on the Gaon Album Chart, and on the International Albums Chart at number 24. Kiss Me Once debuted at the top of the Hungarian Albums Chart and stayed there for three weeks. It later became the 36th best-selling album in Hungary of 2016. In France, the album peaked at number 10 on the albums chart, Minogue's last top-ten entry in the 2010s, and sold 15,000 copies as of July 2014. The album also peaked within the top 10 in the Czech Republic, Croatia, Switzerland, Germany, Slovenia, the Netherlands, and Spain. In Belgium, the album appeared on both regional charts: it peaked at number 10 on the Ultratop Flanders chart, and number 13 on the Wallonia chart. In Italy, Denmark, Austria, and Finland, the album peaked inside the top 20. By early June 2014, Kiss Me Once had sold roughly 200,000 units worldwide.

== Aftermath ==
After the album's release, several publications deemed the commercial value of the album as a flop. In retrospect, Minogue commented; "Maybe it didn't do as well because it wasn't good enough or it didn't deserve more, who knows?" She further exclaimed, "Even in retrospect it's hard to say why something works or it doesn't. It's dependent on what else is out there, the way it's promoted... The tour has been the most successful part of that album campaign for me. The album did give me some freedom." In June 2015, publications reported Minogue's departure from Parlophone was due to the performance of Kiss Me Once, which she first denied. However, she later confirmed she had parted with the label in December 2015 and would stay permanently with Warner Music Australia; she announced her album Kylie Christmas that same month, which would be her final overall release with Parlophone.

== Track listing ==
Kiss Me Once – standard version track listing
No.	Title	Writer(s)	Producer(s)	Length
1.	"Into the Blue"	Kelly "Madame Buttons" Sheehan; Mike Del Rio; Jacob Kasher Hindlin	Del Rio; Sheehan^{[a]}	4:08
2.	"Million Miles"	Chelcee Grimes; Daniel Davidsen; Peter Wallevik; Mich Hansen	Wallevik; Davidsen; Cutfather	3:28
3.	"I Was Gonna Cancel"	Pharrell Williams	Williams; Sheehan^{[a]}	3:32
4.	"Sexy Love"	Wayne Hector; Autumn Rowe; Wallevik; Davidsen; Hansen	Davidsen; Wallevik; Cutfather	3:31
5.	"Sexercize"	Sia Furler; Marcus Lomax; Jordan Johnson; Stefan Johnson; Clarence Coffee, Jr.; Nella Tahrini	The Monsters & the Strangerz; Sheehan^{[a]}	2:47
6.	"Feels So Good"	Tom Aspaul	MNEK; Wayne Wilkins^{[a]}	3:37
7.	"If Only"	Ariel Rechtshaid; Justin Raisen; Dan Nigro	Rechtshaid	3:21
8.	"Les Sex"	Amanda Warner; Peter Wade Keusch; Joshua "J.D." Walker; William Rappaport; Henri Lanz	Walker; GoodWill & MGI	3:47
9.	"Kiss Me Once"	Anne Judith Wik; Ronny Svendsen; Nermin Harambašić; Furler	Jesse Shatkin	3:17
10.	"Beautiful" (with Enrique Iglesias)	Iglesias; Mark Taylor; Alex Smith; Samuel Preston	Taylor; Smith^{[b]}	3:24
11.	"Fine"	Karen Poole; Chris Loco; Kylie Minogue	Loco	3:36
Total length:				38:46

Kiss Me Once – special edition bonus tracks
No.	Title	Writer(s)	Producer(s)	Length
12.	"Mr. President"	Sheehan; Hindlin; Minogue	Thomas Olsen; Sheehan^{[a]}	4:11
13.	"Sleeping with the Enemy"	Claude Kelly; Greg Kurstin	Kurstin; Joe Kearns^{[c]}	3:54
Total length:				46:52

Kiss Me Once – special edition bonus DVD
No.	Title	Length
1.	"Into the Blue" (music video)	4:26
2.	"Making of "Into the Blue" Video"	6:34
3.	"Into the Blue (Trailer)"	0:17
4.	"Behind the Scenes of Kiss Me Once Photo Shoot"	3:32
5.	"Kylie on Kiss Me Once"	12:59

Kiss Me Once – Japanese standard edition bonus tracks
No.	Title	Writer(s)	Producer(s)	Length
12.	"Sparks"	Poole; Matt Schwartz	Schwartz; Poole^{[a]}	3:32
13.	"Into the Blue" (Yasutaka Nakata (Capsule) Remix)	Sheehan; Del Rio; Hindlin	Del Rio; Sheehan^{[a]}; Nakata^{[d]}	6:36
Total length:				48:38

Kiss Me Once – Japanese special edition bonus tracks
No.	Title	Writer(s)	Producer(s)	Length
12.	"Mr. President"	Sheehan; Hindlin; Minogue	Olsen; Sheehan^{[a]}	4:11
13.	"Sleeping with the Enemy"	Kelly; Kurstin	Kurstin; Kearns^{[c]}	3:54
14.	"Sparks"	Poole; Schwartz	Schwartz; Poole^{[a]}	3:32
Total length:				50:25

Kiss Me Once – HMV Digital bonus track
No.	Title	Writer(s)	Producer(s)	Length
12.	"Golden Boy"	Rechtshaid; Raisen; Nigro	Rechtshaid	3:38
Total length:				42:20

Kiss Me Once – iTunes Festival deluxe edition
No.	Title	Writer(s)	Director(s)	Length
14.	"Kiss Me Once" (live at the iTunes Festival)	Anne Judith Wik, Ronny Svendsen, Nermin Harambašić, Furler		3:49
15.	"On a Night Like This" (live at the iTunes Festival)	Steve Torch; Graham Stack; Taylor; Brian Rawling		3:36
16.	"Beautiful" (live at the iTunes Festival)	Iglesias; Taylor; Smith; Preston		3:46
17.	"Love at First Sight" (live at the iTunes Festival)	Minogue; Richard Stannard; Julian Gallagher; Ash Howes; Martin Harrington		4:44
18.	"Step Back in Time" and "Spinning Around" (live at the iTunes Festival)	Mike Stock; Matt Aitken; Pete Waterman; Ira Shickman; Osborne Bingham; Kara DioGuardi; Paula Abdul		8:28
19.	"Locomotion" (live at the iTunes Festival)	Gerry Goffin; Carole King		4:23
20.	"Into the Blue" (music video)		Dawn Shadforth	4:26
21.	"Making of "Into the Blue" Video" (video)			6:34
22.	"Into the Blue (Trailer)" (video)			0:17
23.	"Behind the Scenes of Kiss Me Once Photo Shoot" (video)			3:32
24.	"Kylie on Kiss Me Once" (video)			12:59

Notes

- ^{^[a]} signifies a vocal producer
- ^{^[b]} signifies a co-producer
- ^{^[c]} signifies a vocal co-producer
- ^{^[d]} signifies a remixer
- "Feels So Good" is a cover of "Indiana" written and recorded by Tom Aspaul.
- On censored versions of the album, "Sexy Love" is titled "Love", "Sexercize" is titled "Exercize" and "Les Sex" is retitled "We Could Call It".

== Personnel ==
Credits adapted from the liner notes of the special edition of Kiss Me Once.

=== Recording locations ===
- Westlake, Santa Monica, California (track 12; vocals on tracks 1 and 7)
- Cutfather, Copenhagen (tracks 2 and 4)
- Metropolis, London (vocals on tracks 2, 4 and 6; engineering on track 13)
- Glenwood, Burbank, California (track 3)
- Pulse, Los Angeles (track 5)
- Serenity West Recording, Los Angeles (vocals on track 5)
- Conway, Los Angeles (tracks 8 and 9; vocals on track 5)
- Heavy Duty, Los Angeles (track 7)
- Rinse, London (track 7)
- Metrophonic, London (track 10)
- South Point, Miami (vocals on track 10)
- Subcoustic, London (track 11)
- The Chocolate Factory, London (track 11)
- Echo, Los Angeles (engineering on track 13)

=== Musicians ===
- Kylie Minogue – lead vocals
- Mike Del Rio – programming (track 1)
- Kelly "Madame Buttons" Sheehan – backing vocals (tracks 1, 5, 12)
- Marco Lisboa – additional programming (track 1)
- Daniel Davidsen – guitars (tracks 2, 4); bass (track 4)
- Chelcee Grimes – backing vocals (track 2)
- Mich Hansen – percussion (tracks 2, 4)
- Peter Wallevik – all other instruments (tracks 2, 4)
- Wayne Hector – backing vocals (track 4)
- Autumn Rowe – backing vocals (track 4)
- Eliel Lazo – percussion (track 4)
- Johny Sårde – percussion (track 4)
- Oliver McEwan – additional bass (track 4)
- Tom Aspaul – backing vocals (track 6)
- MNEK – drums (track 6)
- Tommy King – additional keys (track 7)
- Jamie Muhoberac – additional keys (track 7)
- Jesse Shatkin – bass, guitars, keyboards, piano, programming (track 9)
- Erick Serna – guitars (track 9)
- Enrique Iglesias – vocals (track 10)
- Andy Wallace – piano (track 10)
- Alex Smith – keyboards, programming (track 10)
- Mark Taylor – keyboards, programming (track 10)
- Sam Preston – guitar (track 10)
- Karen Poole – backing vocals (track 11)
- Greg Kurstin – bass, keyboards, piano, programming (track 13)

=== Technical ===
- Mike Del Rio – production (track 1)
- Kelly "Madame Buttons" Sheehan – vocal production (tracks 1, 3, 5, 12)
- Peter Wallevik – production (tracks 2, 4)
- Daniel Davidsen – production (tracks 2, 4)
- Cutfather – production (tracks 2, 4)
- Joe Kearns – vocal engineering (tracks 2, 4); vocal co-production, additional engineering (track 13)
- Pharrell Williams – production (track 3)
- The Monsters & the Strangerz – production (track 5)
- Wayne Wilkins – vocal production (track 6)
- MNEK – vocal production (track 6)
- Ariel Rechtshaid – production (track 7)
- J.D. Walker – production (track 8)
- GoodWill & MGI – production (track 8)
- Jesse Shatkin – production (track 9)
- Rob Kleiner – engineering (track 9)
- Mark Taylor – production (track 10)
- Alex Smith – co-production (track 10)
- Ren Swan – mixing, recording (track 10)
- Carlos Paucar – vocal recording (track 10)
- Chris Loco – production, recording (track 11)
- Thomas Olsen – production (track 12)
- Greg Kurstin – production, vocal production (track 13)
- Alex Pasco – additional engineering (track 13)
- Aaron Ahmad – additional engineering assistance (track 13)
- Kylie Minogue – executive production
- Sia – executive production
- Phil Tan – mixing (tracks 1–9, 11–13)
- Daniela Rivera – mixing assistance (tracks 1–9, 11–13)
- Geoff Pesche – mastering (tracks 1–9, 11–13)
- Tom Coyne – mastering (track 10)
- Aya Merrill – mastering (track 10)

=== Artwork ===
- Adjective Noun – design
- William Baker – photography

== Charts ==
=== Weekly charts ===
Weekly chart performance for Kiss Me Once
Chart (2014)	Peak position
Australian Albums (ARIA)	1
Austrian Albums (Ö3 Austria)	16
Belgian Albums (Ultratop Flanders)	10
Belgian Albums (Ultratop Wallonia)	13
Canadian Albums (Billboard)	15
Croatian International Albums (HDU)	10
Czech Albums (ČNS IFPI)	6
Danish Albums (Hitlisten)	20
Dutch Albums (Album Top 100)	10
Finnish Albums (Suomen virallinen lista)	24
French Albums (SNEP)	10
German Albums (Offizielle Top 100)	9
Hungarian Albums (MAHASZ)	1
Irish Albums (IRMA)	4
Italian Albums (FIMI)	13
Japanese Albums (Oricon)	40
Mexican Albums (Top 100 Mexico)	20
New Zealand Albums (RMNZ)	13
Polish Albums (ZPAV)	25
Scottish Albums (Official Charts)	3
Slovenian Albums (Slo Top 30)	9
South Korean Albums (Circle)	96
South Korean International Albums (Circle)	24
Spanish Albums (Promusicae)	9
Swiss Albums (Schweizer Hitparade)	8
Swiss Albums (Les charts Romandy)	8
UK Albums (Official Charts)	2
US Billboard 200	31
US Top Dance Albums (Billboard)	3
US Indie Store Album Sales (Billboard)	23

=== Year-end charts ===
2014 year-end chart performance for Kiss Me Once
Chart (2014)	Position
Australian Artist Albums (ARIA)	34
Belgian Albums (Ultratop Flanders)	199
Belgian Albums (Ultratop Wallonia)	173
Hungarian Albums (MAHASZ)	36
UK Albums (OCC)	93

== Certification and sales ==
Certification and sales for Kiss Me Once
Region	Certification	Certified units/sales
Australia	—	15,000
France	—	15,000
United Kingdom (BPI)	Silver	90,884

== Release history ==
Release dates and formats for Kiss Me Once
Region	Date	Format(s)	Label	Ref(s).
Australia	14 March 2014	CD; CD + DVD; digital download; box set; LP	Warner Music Australia	
Germany	14 March 2014	CD; CD + DVD; digital download; box set; LP	Warner Music Germany	
United Kingdom	17 March 2014	CD; CD + DVD; digital download; box set; LP	Parlophone	
United States	18 March 2014	CD; CD + DVD; digital download; box set; LP	Warner Bros.	
Japan	19 March 2014	CD; CD + DVD; digital download; box set; LP	Warner Music	
Various	7 August 2026	LP record (2026 reissue)	Parlophone	

== See also ==
- List of number-one albums of 2014 (Australia)
- List of UK top-ten albums in 2014
