= Crystallize (Kylie Minogue song) =

2014 single by Kylie Minogue

Single by Kylie Minogue
- Released: 9 June 2014
- Genre: Disco; pop
- Length: 3:10
- Label: Parlophone
- Songwriters: Kylie Minogue; Devonté Hynes; Scott Hoffman
- Producer: Babydaddy

Kylie Minogue singles chronology
"I Was Gonna Cancel" (2014)	"Crystallize" (2014)	"Right Here, Right Now" (2015)

Music video
- "Crystallize" on YouTube

"Crystallize" is a song by Australian recording artist Kylie Minogue. It was written by Minogue, Dev Hynes and Scott Hoffman. The song was originally recorded for Minogue's 2014 album, Kiss Me Once, but did not make the final cut. "Crystallize" was released as a charity single for the fundraising campaign One Note For Cancer on 26 May 2014.

== Chart performance ==
In the United Kingdom, "Crystallize" debuted and peaked at number 60 selling 3,278 copies, but fell out of the top 100 the following week. The song managed to chart within the top 40 in Flanders and Wallonia. In Spain, the song charted inside the top 50 at number 44. In Ireland and France, the song was less successful, charting at number 88 and 139 respectively.

== Charts ==
Chart (2014)	Peak position
Belgium (Ultratip Bubbling Under Flanders)	38
Belgium (Ultratip Bubbling Under Wallonia)	34
France (SNEP)	139
Ireland (IRMA)	88
Scotland Singles (OCC)	65
Spain (Promusicae)	44
UK Singles (OCC)	60

== Release history ==
Region	Date	Format	Label
Worldwide	9 June 2014	Digital download	Parlophone
Australia	13 June 2014	Digital download	Warner Music Australia
