= I Was Gonna Cancel =

2014 single by Kylie Minogue

Single by Kylie Minogue

from the album Kiss Me Once
- Released: 12 May 2014
- Studio: Glenwood Place Studios (Burbank, CA)
- Genre: Disco; funk; dance-pop
- Length: 3:34
- Label: Parlophone
- Songwriter: Pharrell Williams
- Producer: Pharrell Williams

Kylie Minogue singles chronology
"Into the Blue" (2014)	"I Was Gonna Cancel" (2014)	"Crystallize" (2014)

Music video
- "I Was Gonna Cancel" on YouTube

"I Was Gonna Cancel" is a song by Australian singer Kylie Minogue, released as the second and final single from her twelfth studio album Kiss Me Once. The track was written and produced by American singer-songwriter and producer Pharrell Williams who she met while in Los Angeles, California. It was released in the United Kingdom on 11 May 2014 and a day later in the United States.

Musically, the song is influenced by disco and funk, which noted similarities from Williams' previous work and Daft Punk. Lyrically, the song was based on Minogue's conception of having a bad day. "I Was Gonna Cancel" received positive reviews from music critics, many recognizing it as the most "interesting" song on the record and praised Williams's production.

== Background ==
Following the release of The Abbey Road Sessions (2012), Minogue split ways with her long-term manager, Terry Blamey and signed a new management deal with rapper Jay-Z's imprint Roc Nation. Following this new deal, Minogue continued work on her twelfth studio album throughout 2013, with reports emerging in February 2013 that Minogue had been working with singer-songwriter Sia. In an interview with Billboard, Minogue expressed that she had an epiphany during her "Kylie 25" campaign in 2012, stating, "I felt like I needed a new landscape, and once you've got your feet on the ground you're raring to go. [...] So far the support has been great, and it's just another part of this amalgamation of 'new' that I had wished for and was struck by."

== Conception ==
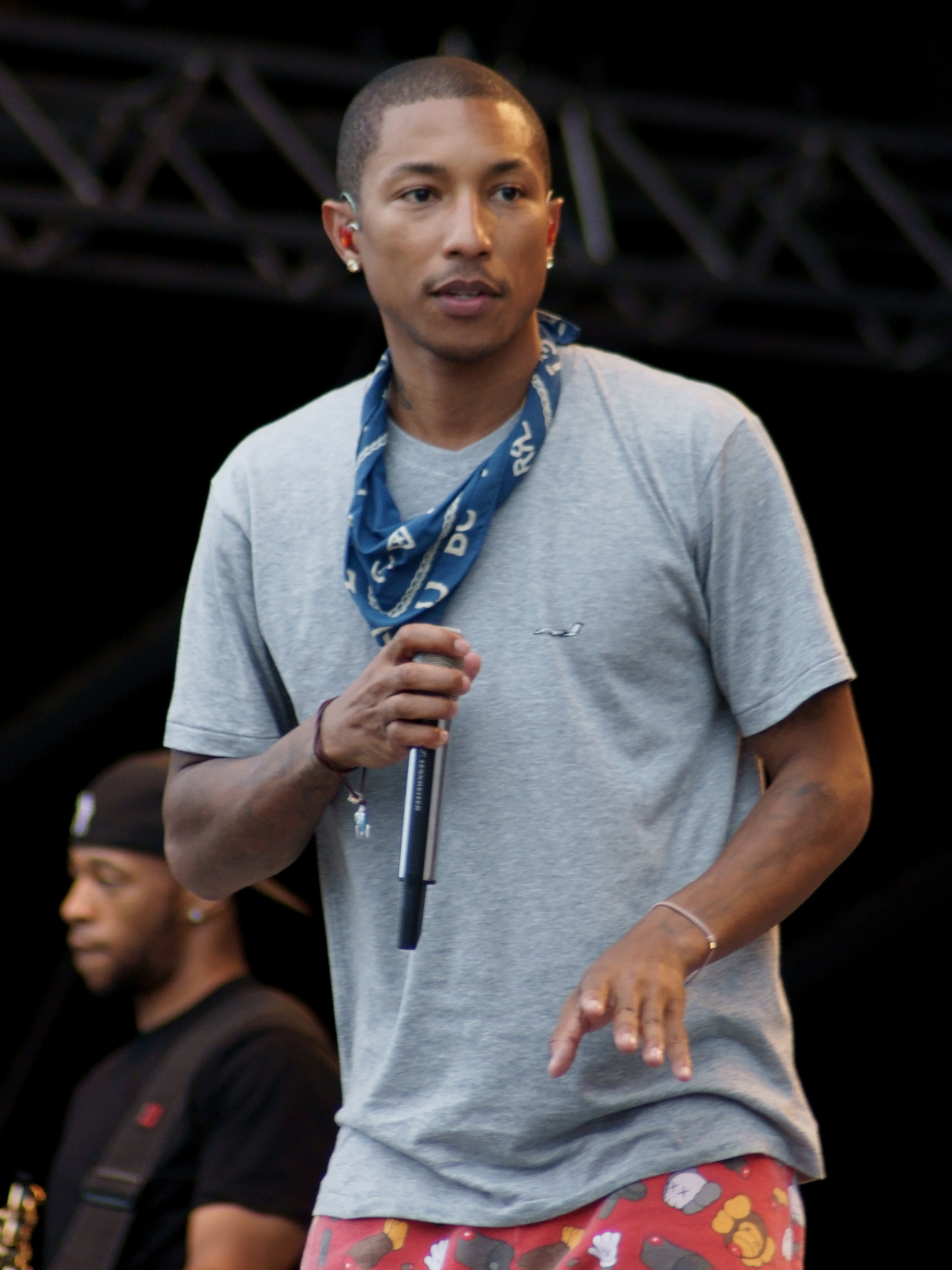
American singer and producer Pharrell Williams wrote and produced the song.

During the recording process of Kiss Me Once, Roc Nation contacted Pharrell Williams to co-produce with Minogue. Eventually, Minogue had met Williams in Los Angeles, California, to produce music with her. According to Minogue, she revealed that she had two days to produce only two songs with Williams, these being "I Was Gonna Cancel" and "The Winners" and stated that the first day she met him she started crying due to an overwhelming day. In an interview with Standard.co.uk, she said;

"It was a dream come true because I've wanted to work with him for a long time. I had two days with him and did two songs, one of which is on my album and it's called I Was Gonna Cancel – because I was having the worst day. Everything was too much. So my second day going in I was literally talking to myself saying, 'Keep it together, this is a very important day, it's Pharrell.' And I burst into tears as soon as I got there. That's why he wrote 'I Was Gonna Cancel' as I didn't feel like going, but had to."

In an aftermath interview, she said about her collaboration: "I had two days in the studio with Pharrell, which was a dream come true. On the second day, I was having a bad day and was thinking of cancelling [...] He turned my bad day into something amazing by writing the song... but I was patchy and didn't sing very well. It was honest and embarrassing."

== Composition ==
Musically, "I Was Gonna Cancel" is a disco and R&B song. Tim Sendra said that the song is "a heartwarming affirmation of how awesome she is that sounds like a continuation of his work with Daft Punk on "Get Lucky". Ryan Lathan said "squelchy Stevie-Wonderesque electric keyboard flourishes, and overly-processed, pseudo-operatic background vocals, there's little here in this R&B-electro brew, worth throwing back or bothering to revisit. It should have been relegated to a single B-side and replaced with last year's superior 'Skirt'." Ben Cardew from NME had also compared the song to Daft Punk's single "Get Lucky", calling it "disco-ish." Andy Gill declared "I Was Gonna Cancel" as a "typically light, frothy pop syllabub in Pharrell's signature style[;] It sprinkles chimes over staccato synth burbles that hark back to the Commodores."

== Critical reception ==
"I Was Gonna Cancel" received favorable reviews from most music critics. Tim Sendra from Allmusic highlighted the song as an album standout, labeling it as "amazingly catchy." Brittany Spanos from Spin said the song was familiar but "refreshed disco territory with 'I Was Gonna Cancel', a Pharrell track that carries some serious "Get Lucky" vibes thanks to a Chic-inspired bass line underpinning a pulsating house beat." Kitty Empire from The Observer felt the song was a "perfect fit" for Minogue and called Williams a "pro", saying that "I Was Gonna Cancel" brings the best out of Pharrell Williams' aerated funk-pop and slots in Kylie's effortless disco vocal."

Joe Muggs from Fact magazine was less impressed, saying "the fidgety 'I was Gonna Cancel', with its scampering clavinet funk, Gloria Estefan-tinged song and whizzy trance chords and it's clear that this stuff hasn't just been picked off the peg." Ryan Lathan was less impressed as well, saying "Pharrell was recruited to liven up the proceedings, but his work on Madonna's Hard Candy was more inspired six years ago." He also criticized the lyrical content by saying "The song isn't particularly cutting edge and lyrical gems such as "everything is clearer, than a mirror is to woman, just as safe as a dog is to man", only serve as fodder for critical mocking." A reviewer from the publication musicOMH said "the similarly ubiquitous Pharrell Williams fares better with I Was Gonna Cancel, the kind of effortlessly catchy dance floor filler he specialises in, though the bizarre borrowing of the hook from Beyoncé's 'Green Light' only serves to remind that there are artists who are currently doing this much better." Pop Reviewer was less favorable, giving the single a 2 star rating stating "There is no essence of classic Kylie to be found here, just an abundance of emotionless singing"

== Chart performance ==
In the United Kingdom, "I Was Gonna Cancel" debuted at 59 selling 3,989 copies. The next week the song fell out of the top 100. The song is one of Minogue's lowest chart performances since that of previous singles "Put Your Hands Up" and "Flower". In Wallonia the song debuted at 41 before eventually peaking at 25. In the US, the song peaked at number five on the Hot Dance Club Songs.

== Music video ==
Prior to releasing the music video for "I Was Gonna Cancel" Minogue released a lyrics video which has garnered over 570,000 views on YouTube.

The accompanying music video was shot by Dimitri Basil and choreographed by Rafael Bonachela in Melbourne while Minogue was attending the Logie Awards of 2014. The video was released on 17 May on her YouTube channel. Originally, the plans were to include many people into the video so they can dance and play along to the song, but were not to be paid for this. This courted controversy through media industries, criticizing the choice to not pay the dancers. Some reports said that some dancers were then offered for their work after the producers received complaints about the lack of pay. Bonachela eventually told publications that he was pleased that they were going to be paid, stating "I understand things have been resolved now so it's great to know that people can have a voice, people can speak and mistakes can be resolved. That's a very positive thing,"

According to Minogue, the synopsis is about pedestrian life and how it was similar to the day she recorded the song; "It's an abstract look at pedestrian life and how we're all just trying to get through and rise above everyday challenges. Although the song talks about a real-life event that happened the day I recorded the song with Pharrell, the video has a more conceptual approach and I love how surreal it looks."

The music video has 3 million views on Minogue's official YouTube channel as of November 2020.

=== Reception ===
Critical reaction towards the video has been mixed. Michael Wass from website Idolator wrote: "Kylie Minogue has delivered some of the most memorable and innovative videos in the history of popular music but "I Was Gonna Cancel" is not one of them." Mandi Salerno from PopCrush called the video concept "simple" and that even though the song was no "Sexercize", it was very interesting and thoughtful, referring to the concept as "funky." However, Daniel Welsh from The Huffington Post was less positive, believing that although the song was appealing, he felt Minogue didn't stand out from the crowd "literally."

== Live performances ==
In April 2014, Minogue performed "I Was Gonna Cancel" at the Logie Awards of 2014. In May 2014, she performed the song on The Voice of Italy, Alan Carr: Chatty Man and in Cannes for Le Grand Journal (Canal+). Minogue also performed the single on The Voice: la plus belle voix along with "Into the Blue", "All the Lovers" and "Can't Get You Out of My Head" with the finalists in April 2014. Unfortunately, the song was not included in the set list for the Kiss Me Once Tour, despite being released as a single.

== In other media ==
"I Was Gonna Cancel" was featured on the seventh season of RuPaul's Drag Race, during a lip-sync battle between contestants Jasmine Masters and Kennedy Davenport; it resulted in Masters being eliminated from the competition.

== Formats and track listings ==
Australian digital download; UK and European store exclusive 7-inch picture disc

1. "I Was Gonna Cancel" – 3:33

UK and European store exclusive 2-track CD single

1. "I Was Gonna Cancel" – 3:33
2. "I Was Gonna Cancel" (The Presets Remix) – 5:43

Australian 7-inch vinyl

1. "I Was Gonna Cancel" – 3:33
2. "Into the Blue" (Patrick Hagenaar Colour Code Radio Edit) – 3:22

International remix EP (Remixes)

1. "I Was Gonna Cancel" (The Presets Remix) – 5:43
2. "I Was Gonna Cancel" (Maze & Masters Remix) - 6:01
3. "I Was Gonna Cancel" (Moto Blanco Remix) (Radio Edit) - 3:21
4. "I Was Gonna Cancel" (KDA Remix) - 7:05

== Remixes ==
Moto Blanco Mixes

- "I Was Gonna Cancel (Moto Blanco Club Mix)" – 6:25
- "I Was Gonna Cancel (Moto Blanco Radio Remix)" – 3:22
- "I Was Gonna Cancel (Moto Blanco Dub)" – 6:25

The Presets Mixes

- "I Was Gonna Cancel (The Presets Remix)" – 5:43
- "I Was Gonna Cancel (The Presets Instrumental)" – 5:43

KDA Mix

- "I Was Gonna Cancel (KDA Remix)" – 7:05

Maze & Masters Mix

- "I Was Gonna Cancel (Maze & Masters Remix)" – 6:01

Rene Amesz Mix

- "I Was Gonna Cancel (Rene Amesz Remix)" – 5:31

Steph Seroussi Mix

- "I Was Gonna Cancel (Steph Seroussi Family Remix)" – 3:32

Guy Scheiman Mix

- "I Was Gonna Cancel (Guy Scheiman Remix)" – 7:38

== Charts ==
Weekly chart performance for "I Was Gonna Cancel"
Chart (2014)	Peak position
Belgium (Ultratip Bubbling Under Wallonia)	25
Scottish Singles Sales (Official Charts)	84
UK Singles (Official Charts)	59
US Dance Club Songs (Billboard)	5

== Release history ==
Release dates and formats for "I Was Gonna Cancel"
Region	Date	Format(s)	Label(s)	Ref.
Australia	22 April 2014	Digital download	Warner Music Australasia	
New Zealand	22 April 2014	Digital download	Warner Music Australasia	
Italy	5 May 2014	Contemporary hit radio	Warner Music	
United Kingdom	9 May 2014	Digital download (Remix EP)	Parlophone	
United States	9 May 2014	Digital download (Remix EP)	Warner Bros.	
Australia	16 May 2014	Digital download (Remix EP)	Warner Music Australasia	
