= Into the Blue (Kylie Minogue song) =

2014 single by Kylie Minogue

Single by Kylie Minogue

from the album Kiss Me Once
- B-side: "Sparks"
- Released: 27 January 2014
- Recorded: 28 May 2013
- Studio: Westlake Recording Studios (Santa Monica, CA)
- Genre: EDM; Pop
- Length: 4:08
- Label: Parlophone
- Songwriters: Kelly Sheehan; Mike Del Rio; Jacob Kasher Hindlin
- Producer: Mike Del Rio

Kylie Minogue singles chronology
| "Limpido" (2013) | "Into the Blue" (2014) | "I Was Gonna Cancel" (2014) |

Music video
- "Into the Blue" on YouTube

"Into the Blue" is a song by Australian singer Kylie Minogue. It was written by Kelly Sheehan, Jacob Kasher, and Mike Del Rio and produced by the latter for Minogue's twelfth studio album, Kiss Me Once (2014). The song was recorded in London, England on Minogue's 45th birthday in May 2013 and premiered as the album's first single on BBC Radio 2's Ken Bruce show on 27 January 2014. Musically, "Into the Blue" features instrumentation of synthesizers, keyboards and strings. The lyrical content talks about being independent, free and happy.

Upon its release, "Into the Blue" received critical acclaim from music critics, some of whom compared it to her 2010 single "All the Lovers". Many likened the lyrical content's uplifting theme and praised the composition, vocals and production, while critics noted Minogue retaining her classic image. Compared to the lead singles from Minogue's previous albums, it became a moderate commercial success on the charts, reaching the top ten in Ireland and Japan, and component charts in Australia, Belgium, the United Kingdom, and the United States.

The accompanying music video for "Into the Blue" was directed by Dawn Shadforth and features Minogue partying and walking down the streets of London while spending time with her on-screen boyfriend. It was released on 2 February 2014 on Minogue's YouTube account and received universal acclaim from music commentators.

== Background and composition ==
In 2012, Minogue began a year-long celebration for her 25 years in the music industry, which was often known as "K25". The anniversary started with her embarking on the Anti Tour, which featured b-sides, demos and rarities from her music catalogue. Minogue released the compilation album, The Abbey Road Sessions in October 2012. The album contained reworked and orchestral versions of her previous songs which were recorded at London's Abbey Road Studios. The album received favourable reviews from music critics and it debuted at number two in the United Kingdom.

In January 2014, Minogue uploaded a picture on her Instagram account saying "Happy New Year #Lovers....I wish you all the best and can't wait to share new music with you in #KM2014 ❤️💋❤️#IntoTheBlue". The hashtag #IntoTheBlue was then rumored to be the title of the upcoming Minogue single or album. "Into the Blue" was slated to be premiered on Minogue's website on 27 January, however, a Spanish Tumblr page had leaked a 30-second recording on 19 January 2014. Minogue premiered "Into the Blue" on BBC Radio 2's Ken Bruce Show on 27 January 2014. The song's artwork was unveiled the same day, featuring Minogue wearing a see-through like dress with the title overlapping her.

"Into the Blue" is set in common time with a moderate tempo of 116 beats per minute, and is written in the key of A major. Minogue's vocals span from the low note of A^{3} to the high note of A^{5}.

== Critical reception ==
"Into the Blue" received critical acclaim upon its release. Christina Lee from Idolator said "While launched by piano chords and a wash of strings, "Into the Blue" truly takes off at the seismic hook, where Minogue's crystalline voice soars over an arena-ready dance breakdown. She sounds optimistic, if not in total bliss." A reviewer from The Huffington Post gave it eight reasons why "Kylie's New Release is the Best Pop Single You'll Hear All Year". The publication praised her for trying something modern yet "classy" and said "a bona-fide [that] smack you between the eyes, instant pop classic but it manages the rare feat of getting better with every listen [...]" Perez Hilton said that, along with the video; "The songstress has done it again with this AH-Mazing hit of a song and fantabulous music video!!" Consequence of Sound was positive towards the song, saying that it is "an alluring and life-affirming pop song filled with uplifting lyrics: "When I got my back up against the wall, don't need no one to rescue me/'Cause I ain't waiting up for no miracle, yeah tonight I'm running free!"

Bernard Zuel from The Sydney Morning Herald was positive calling "Into The Blue" "a winner of a pop song which has a damn catchy, lightly brushed with electronic dance music sound that deep down is pretty much a classic Kylie Minogue pop tune." However, he also stated that while it is a solid comeback single, "it also feels a bit too safe to make much of an impact in the singles chart." Lewis Corner from Digital Spy gave a positive review of the song ahead of the UK release, saying that the song was "a move that has only served to enhance what she already does very well" and that he wants "Kylie doing more of this for a while longer yet."

== Chart performance ==
"Into the Blue" debuted on both Ultratip charts in Flanders and Wallonia at number fifty-seven and twenty-three, respectively. In Wallonia, the song rose to number ten, Minogue's first Ultratip top ten entry since her 2010 single "Get Outta My Way". The song then followed in Finland, where it debuted at number twenty-two and eventually debuted at number sixteen in Spain. The song debuted at number seventy on the French Singles Chart, number nineteen in Hungary and number 243 on Russia's TopHit airplay chart. The song peaked inside the top ten in both Belgium charts, along with peaking inside the top five in Croatia, reaching number four.

In her native Australia, "Into the Blue" debuted at number forty-six with 2,648 sales, making it Minogue's first lead single not to debut within the top forty. The song slipped to number 96 with 1,184 sales, bringing total sales to 3,832, after two full weeks on sale, making it her most unsuccessful lead single. However, the song debuted at number 7 on the Australian Domestic Charts, until falling to number twenty in its following week. The song debuted at number sixty-six on the Japan Hot 100, rising to number sixteen the following week. On April 4, the song rose back up from number 33 and reached its peak inside the top 10 at number 8. The song debuted at number 182 on the South Korea International Digital Chart, with sales of 1,537. In the United Kingdom, the song entered the singles chart at number-twelve.

The song was released in the United States and Canada on 28 January. Following its first week sales of 4,000 digital downloads, the song debuted at number thirty-nine and forty-one on the US Dance/Electronic Digital Songs and Dance/Electronic Songs charts respectively. The song made its official debut at number fifty-two on the US Hot Dance Club Songs. In its fifth week on the chart, the song has risen to number one.

== Music video ==
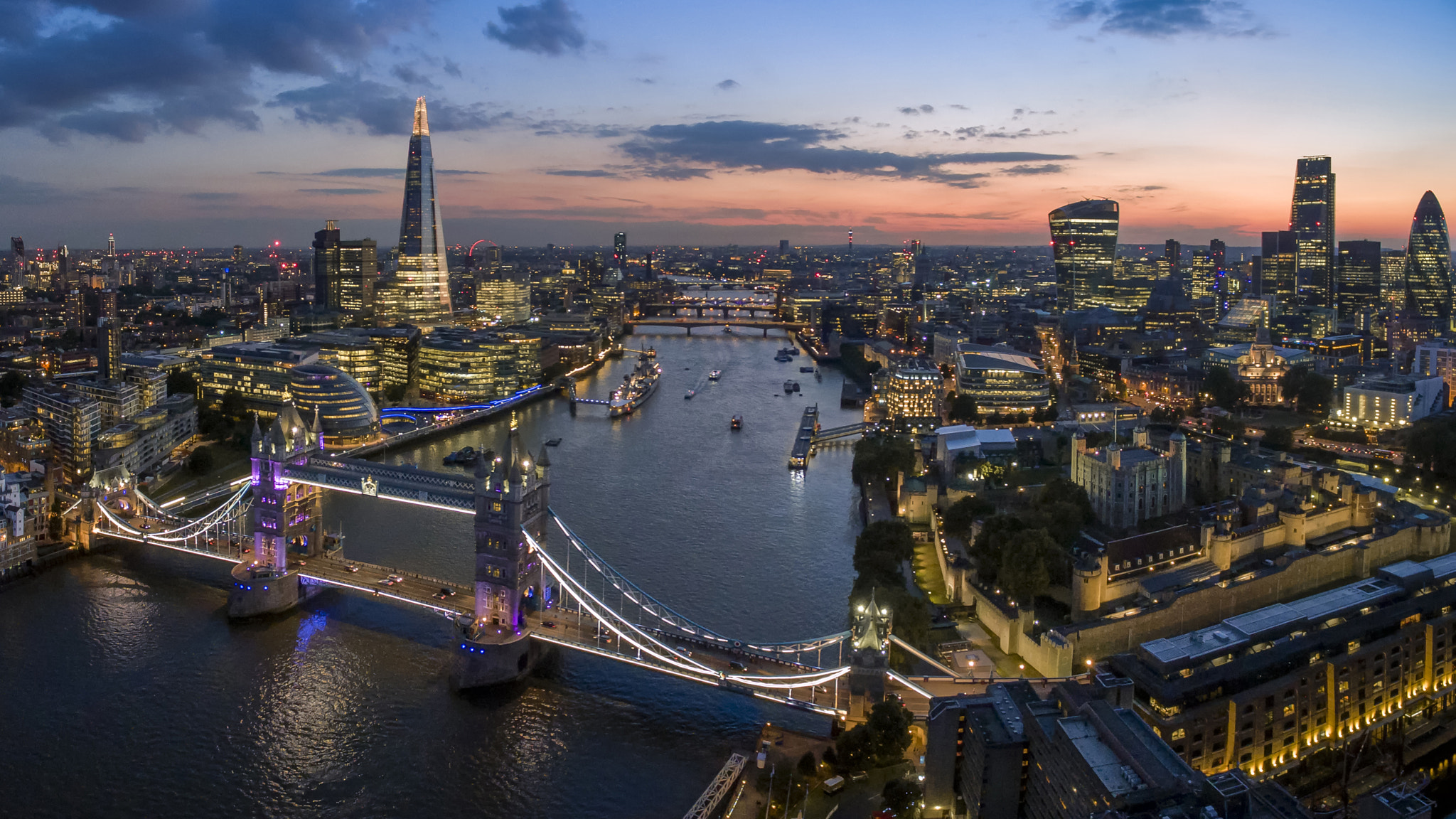
The music video for "Into the Blue" was filmed in various locations throughout London.

Directed by frequent collaborator Dawn Shadforth, a music video for "Into the Blue" was filmed in London in January 2014. Co-starring French actor Clément Sibony as Minogue's love interest, it tells the "story of glimpses into the world of a man and woman, a lost weekend, scenes from a film where the context is not quite clear." Shadforth was "inspired stylistically by some early John Cassavetes films" and wanted to make "something with an improvisational style, a fluid camera, and with quite a pure and simple theme about love". He further elaborated on the video in an interview with Videostatic: "All our previous videos together had been performance led, and I had wanted, for ages, to do something with Kylie that was less about dancing and performance, more about acting and emotion. I wrote the treatment for "Into the Blue" this way and Kylie really responded". The visuals were shot on three cameras, including a Black and White Alexa, a colour Alexa and a 16mm Bolex second camera, by Richard Stewart and Mark Adcock. Saint Laurent dressed Minogue who was styled by Cathy Edwards with sunglasses by Bulgari.

Released on 3 February 2014, the music video for "Into the Blue" was well-received from music critics and publications. Jason Lipshutz from Billboard labeled it "dreamy" and said that "Minogue's latest visual in unapologetically glamorous, with the pop star and her on-screen boyfriend mixing lavish party life with bedroom-bound alone time and technicolor with black-and-white. There is some drama that requires Minogue's beau to run after her down a deserted sidewalk, but more importantly, Minogue does a killer robot dance move at the 1:16 mark, which is not to be missed." A reviewer from the magazine OK! Magazine labeled the video "sexy" saying "Rolling around on a bed, 45-year-old Kylie sexily flaunts her enviable figure - including her toned pins - and locks lips with the topless hunk in some rather racy scenes [...]"

== Live performances ==
In March 2014, Minogue performed "Into the Blue" on the Sport Relief 2014 television special, The Voice UK and Echo Awards 2014. In April 2014, she performed the song on Amici di Maria De Filippi in Italy and on The Graham Norton Show. "Into the Blue" was used to close Minogue's Kiss Me Once Tour and Kylie Summer 2015 Tour.

In addition, it was one of the seven songs that Kylie performed during the Closing Ceremony of 2014 Commonwealth Games.

== Track listing ==
7" single
| No. | Title | Writer(s) | Producer(s) | Length |
|---|---|---|---|---|
| 1. | "Into the Blue" | Kelly "Madame Buttons" Sheehan; Mike Del Rio; Jacob Kasher Hindlin | Del Rio; Sheehan^{[a]} | 4:08 |
| 2. | "Sparks" | Poole; Matt Schwartz | Schwartz; Poole^{[a]} | 3:32 |

CD single
| No. | Title | Writer(s) | Producer(s) | Length |
|---|---|---|---|---|
| 1. | "Into the Blue" (album version) | Sheehan; Del Rio; Hindlin | Del Rio; Sheehan^{[a]} | 4:08 |
| 2. | "Into the Blue" (S-Man Deep Blue remix) | Sheehan; Del Rio; Hindlin | Del Rio; Sheehan^{[a]}; S-Man^{[b]} | 7:35 |
| 3. | "Into the Blue" (Patrick Hagenaar Colour Code Remix) | Sheehan; Del Rio; Hindlin | Del Rio; Sheehan^{[a]}; Patrick Hagenaar^{[b]} | 6:22 |
| 4. | "Into the Blue" (Vanilla Ace remix) | Sheehan; Del Rio; Hindlin | Del Rio; Sheehan^{[a]}; Vanilla Ace^{[b]} | 6:22 |

Notes

- ^{^[a]} signifies vocal producer(s)
- ^{^[b]} signifies additional producer(s)

== Remixes ==
Roger Sanchez Mixes

- "Into the Blue (S-Man Deep Blue Remix)" — 7:35
- "Into the Blue (S-Man Instrumental)" — 7:35

Patrick Hagenaar Mix

- "Into the Blue (Patrick Hagenaar Colour Code Remix)" — 6:22
- "Into the Blue (Patrick Hagenaar Colour Code Dub)" — 6:22

Tracy Young Mixes

- "Into the Blue (Tracy Young Ferosh Reconstruction Club)" — 6:55
- "Into the Blue (Tracy Young Ferosh Reconstruction Dub)" — 6:55

Country Club Martini Crew Mixes

- "Into the Blue (Country Club Martini Crew Remix)" — 5:55

Vanilla Ace Mix

- "Into the Blue (Vanilla Ace Remix)" — 6:22

Morlando Mix

- "Into the Blue (Morlando Remix)" — 6:30

Yasutaka Nakata Mix

- "Into the Blue (Yasutaka Nakata Capsule Remix)" — 6:36

== Charts ==
=== Weekly charts ===
Weekly chart performance for "Into the Blue"
| Chart (2014) | Peak position |
|---|---|
| Australia (ARIA) | 46 |
| Austria (Ö3 Austria Top 40) | 37 |
| Belgium (Ultratip Bubbling Under Flanders) | 6 |
| Belgium (Ultratip Bubbling Under Wallonia) | 3 |
| CIS Airplay (TopHit) | 146 |
| Finland Download (Latauslista) | 22 |
| France (SNEP) | 47 |
| Germany (GfK) | 31 |
| Ireland (IRMA) | 9 |
| Italy (FIMI) | 69 |
| Hungary (Rádiós Top 40) | 9 |
| Hungary (Single Top 40) | 19 |
| Japan (Billboard Japan Hot 100) | 8 |
| Japan Hot Overseas (Billboard) | 3 |
| Luxembourg (Radio Luxembourg) | 40 |
| Scottish Singles Sales (Official Charts) | 10 |
| Spain (Promusicae) | 16 |
| Switzerland (Schweizer Hitparade) | 32 |
| UK Singles (Official Charts) | 12 |
| US Dance Club Songs (Billboard) | 1 |
| US Hot Dance/Electronic Songs (Billboard) | 24 |

=== Year-end charts ===
Year-end chart performance for "Into the Blue"
| Chart (2014) | Position |
|---|---|
| Hungary (Rádiós Top 40) | 60 |
| Japan Adult Contemporary (Billboard) | 19 |
| Japan Hot Overseas (Billboard Japan) | 13 |
| Japan Radio Songs (Billboard Japan) | 11 |
| US Dance Club Songs (Billboard) | 39 |
| US Hot Dance/Electronic Songs (Billboard) | 91 |

== Release history ==
Release dates and formats for "Into the Blue"
| Country | Date | Format | Label |
|---|---|---|---|
| Australia | 27 January 2014 | Digital download | Warner Music Australasia |
| New Zealand | 27 January 2014 | Digital download | Warner Music Australasia |
| Europe | 28 January 2014 | Digital download | Warner Music |
| United States | 28 January 2014 | Digital download | Warner Bros. |
| Canada | 28 January 2014 | Digital download | Warner Music |
| Italy | 31 January 2014 | Contemporary hit radio | Warner Music |
| Australia | 14 February 2014 | Digital download (Remix EP) | Warner Music Australasia |
| United States | 25 February 2014 | Digital download (Remix EP) | Warner Bros. |
| Germany | 7 March 2014 | CD single; digital download | Warner Music |
| Austria | 7 March 2014 | CD single; digital download | Warner Music |
| Switzerland | 7 March 2014 | CD single; digital download | Warner Music |
| Ireland | 7 March 2014 | CD single; digital download | Warner Music |
| United Kingdom | 9 March 2014 | CD single; digital download | Parlophone |

== See also ==
- List of number-one dance singles of 2014 (U.S.)
