= Sport Relief 2014 =

- Genre: Telethon
- Presented by: Main telethon: Gary Lineker; David Walliams; Davina McCall; Claudia Winkleman; Jack Whitehall; Fearne Cotton
- Country of origin: United Kingdom
- Original language: English

Production
- Executive producer: Richard Curtis
- Production location: Queen Elizabeth Olympic Park from Copper Box
- Camera setup: Multiple

Original release
- Network: BBC One, BBC Two
- Release: 21 March – 22 March 2014

Related
- Sport Relief 2012; Sport Relief 2016

Sport Relief 2014 was a fundraising event organised by Sport Relief. A number of run-up events took place and the main event consisted of a live telethon broadcast on BBC One and BBC Two from the evening of Friday 21 March 2014 to early the following morning. Due to the closure of BBC Television Centre, the live studio event is now broadcast from the Queen Elizabeth Olympic Park in London.

== Main event ==
The live telethon was broadcast on BBC One and BBC Two from the evening of Friday 21 March 2014 to early the following morning as well as a number of run-up events and was presented by Gary Lineker, Davina McCall, David Walliams, Claudia Winkleman, Jack Whitehall, Fearne Cotton, Clare Balding and Gabby Logan.

=== Presenters ===
Times (approx)	Presenters
19:00–20:30	Gary Lineker & David Walliams
20:30–22:00	Gary Lineker, Davina McCall & David Walliams
22:00–22:40	Claudia Winkleman & Jack Whitehall (BBC Two)
22:40–00:00	Claudia Winkleman & Jack Whitehall
00:00–01:00	Gary Lineker & Fearne Cotton

=== Appeal film presenters ===
Stars including Davina McCall, David Tennant, Alex Jones, Gary Lineker, David Beckham, Little Mix and Kelly Hoppen presented appeal films.

=== Official single ===
Little Mix recorded the official single "Word Up!" for this Sport Relief.

=== Sketches and features ===
Title	Brief Description	Starring
Clash of the Titans	John Bishop and Sebastian Coe lead two teams of celebrities into battle, across an array of Olympic Events live from the Olympic Park including: Men's Elimination Cycling, Women's Track Cycling, Rhythmic Gymnastics, Synchronised Swimming and Swimming Relay	John Bishop, Sebastian Coe, Olly Murs, Nicola Adams, Freddie Flintoff, Helen Skelton, Richard Bacon, Nick Grimshaw, Sally Phillips, Greg James, Amy Williams, Patrick Kielty with Clare Balding and Gabby Logan
Miranda	Miranda leads the nation in a Sport Relief warm up	Miranda Hart, David Haye and David Ginola, with the Clash of The Titans teams, Gary Lineker and David Walliams
Strictly Come Dancing: Paralympian Special	4 Paralympians take to the dance floor for a special performance	Tess Daly, Len Goodman, Darcey Bussell, Bruno Tonioli, Lee Pearson, David Clarke, Hannah Cockroft, Nathan Stephens and Martine Wright
Only Fools and Horses	Del Boy and Rodney spot a football legend at the local market in Peckham	David Jason, Nicholas Lyndhurst and David Beckham
When Beckham met Peckham	A look behind the scenes at the return of Only Fools and Horses after 11 years away	David Jason, Nicholas Lyndhurst and David Beckham
Mock the Week	Mock the Week team pick on Andy Murray for jokes	Dara Ó Briain, Hugh Dennis, Andy Parsons, Holly Walsh, Ed Byrne, Milton Jones and Andy Murray
Especially For You	Kylie Minogue performs the classic "Especially for You" with a very special guest	Kylie Minogue, David Walliams and Jason Donovan
W1A	Ian Fletcher returns to talk about his new position at the BBC as Head of Values	Hugh Bonneville
Sport Relief World Cup Single	Gary Barlow collects a group of singers and ageing sports stars to create a new song for the 2014 World Cup	Gary Barlow, Melanie C, Gary Lineker, Katy B, Kimberley Walsh, Emma Bunton, Pixie Lott, Conor Maynard and David Seaman
Footballers Mastermind	David Walliams quizzes three footballers	David Walliams, Scott Parker, Michael Dawson, and Jack Wilshere

=== Musical performances ===
Artist	Song	Notes
Little Mix	"Word Up!"	The official Sport Relief song for this year.
Kylie Minogue	"Especially for You"	
Coldplay	"Magic"	(pre-recorded)
Boyzone	"Everything I Own"	
Kylie Minogue	"Into the Blue"	
Katy B	"Crying for No Reason"	

== Within other shows ==
TV programmes that led up to the main event included:

- The Great Comic Relief Bake Off
- Comic Relief Does Glee Club
- Sport Relief's Top Dog
- Famous, Rich and Hungry
- Davina Beyond Breaking Point for Sport Relief
- Pointless Celebrities
- The Sport Relief Games Show
- Alex Against the Rock for Sport Relief

== Donation progress ==
Time	Amount	Large donations
20:44 GMT	£17,876,931	Davina Beyond Breaking Point (£2,239,931)
21:58 GMT	£31,015,948	
23:54 GMT	£45,000,113	
00:45?	£51,242,186	
