= Sikulu =

Unpitched percussion instrument

The Sikulu is a tall, narrow, single-unit drum commonly found in Bas-Congo province in the Democratic Republic of the Congo. It is an essential instrument played in festivities and ritual ceremonies. Variants of Sikulu (designated under different names) are also found among some tribes in Angola and the Republic of Congo. The same instrument passed, by slaves, to the other side of the Atlantic has become the conga, so productive in Cuban/Puerto-Rican salsa music.
