= Eliel Lazo =

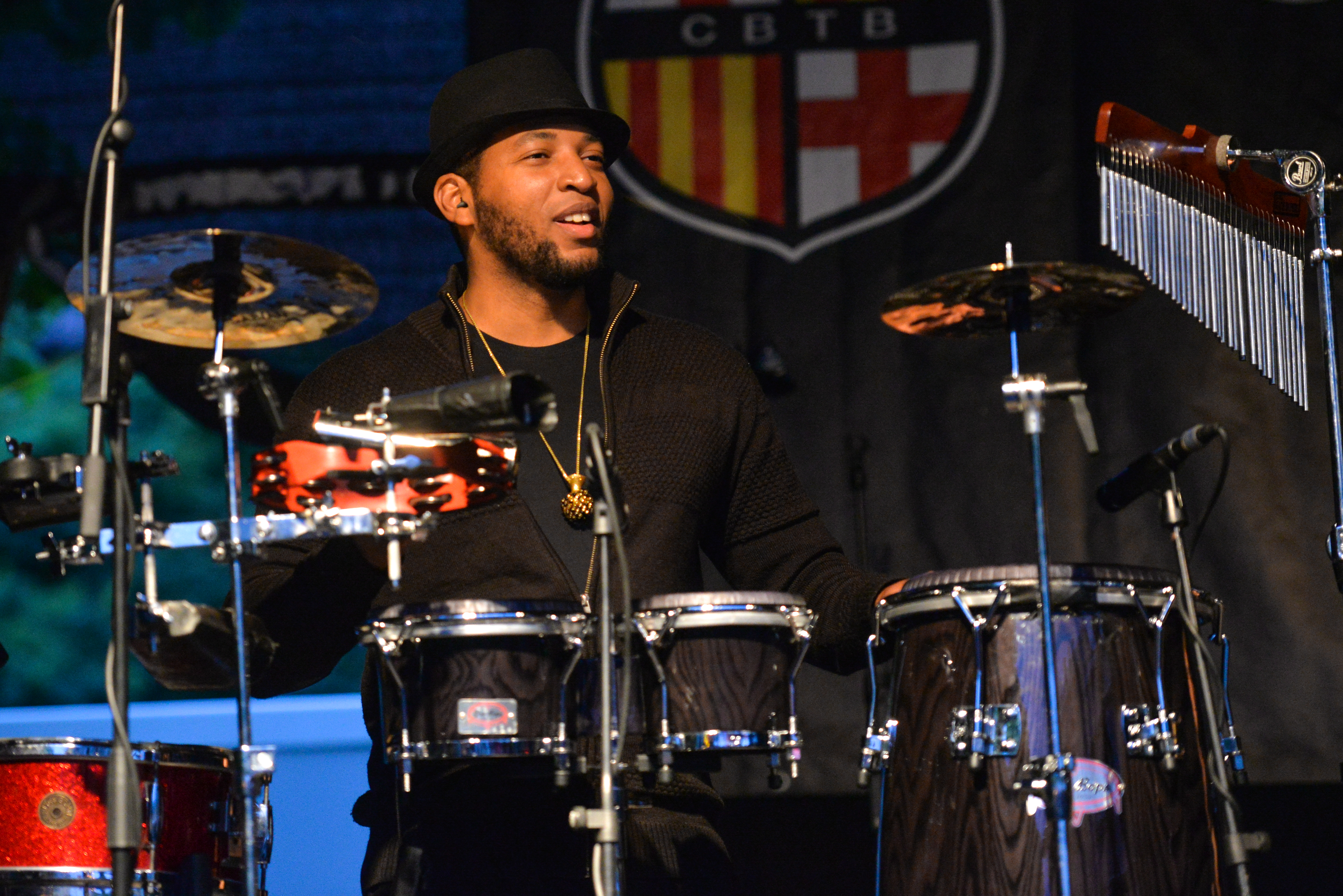

Background information
- Born: November 1, 1983 (age 42); Marianao, Havana, Cuba
- Genres: Afro-Cuban; jazz; rock; soul; pop; funk
- Occupations: Percussionist; singer-songwriter; producer; composer
- Instruments: Percussion; vocals
- Labels: Commodo Depots Japan; Sony BMG; Stunt Records
- Website: https://www.eliellazo.com

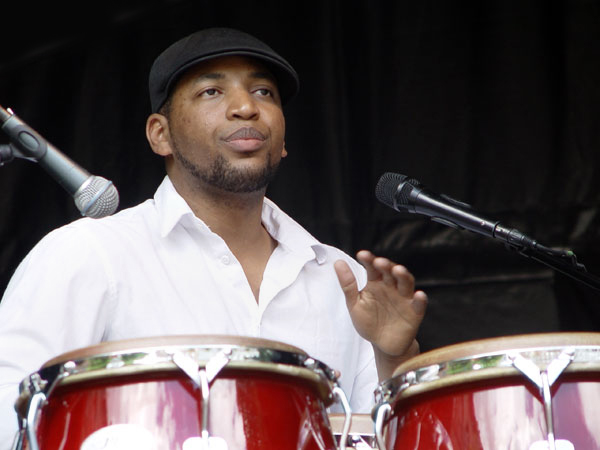
Eliel Lazo at Aarhus Jazz Festival, Denmark 2011

Eliel Williams Lazo Linares (known as Eliel Lazo or Gods Hands) (born 1 November 1983 in Havana) is a Cuban percussionist, songwriter, composer, producer, jazz, rock, Latin and pop musician living in Denmark. Eliel is one of the most unique percussionists in recent times. In 2011, he received the Danish Music Awards (DMA World) for his album "El Conguero" (Stunt Records). He won also the "International Percussion Percuba Prize". During his career, he collaborated with musicians such as Oscar Valdes, Chucho Valdes, Herbie Hancock, Bob Mintzer, Wayne Shorter, Michel Camilo and more, and bands such as Diakara, Habana Ensemble, DR Big Band, WDR Big Band, BBC Big Band, The Savage Rose, The Antonelli Orchestra, Mikkel Nordsø Band and others. In 2008, the newspaper Havana Times labelled him "one of Cuba's top percussionists".

== Career ==
Eliel Lazo began playing at an early age, egged on by his family. He studied at Oscar Valdes’ school of percussion (former singer and percussionist, of Irakere). In 2003, at the age of 19, Eliel won the PERCUBA International Percussion Prize. Lazo first visited Denmark in 2004 on an invitation from the Danish Radio Big Band. Other invitations followed. Soon, Denmark became a base on his travels around the world, and in 2007, he made Copenhagen his home. He has played with musicians such as Michel Camilo, Chucho Valdes, Changuito, Tata Güines, Herbie Hancock, Bob Mintzer, Oscar Valdes, Carlos del Puerto, and Airto Moreira. He has also played with Cuban bands, such as Diakara, Klimax and Habana Ensemble. He has also worked with the Danish Radio Big Band, The Savage Rose, The Antonellie Orchestra, Blanco Y Negro, Mikkel Nordsø Band, Aarhus Jazz Orchestra, Tip Toe Big Band, WDR Big Band from Germany, and BBC Big Band from The UK. In 2004, Lazo recorded his first album Art Ensemble of Habana with Commodo Depots records from Japan. He then released his first recording with Stunt Records, Blanco Y Negro, which was done in Cuba. His third album El Conguero, also with Stunt Records, was awarded the Danish Music award best album of the year in the World Music category. Lazo played on Mikkel Nordsø's 7 Steps to Heaven and Diving in Space for 3 Decades - Hanne Boel's The Shining of Sings, the Danish Radio Big Band's Cuban Flavor and Spirituals, where he is featured as percussionist and vocalist. His playing is also featured on the Cubadisco CD Andante, and Cesar Lopez Y Habana Ensemble and Kylie Minogue's Kiss Me Once. He performed in the American movie Music Under the Radar. He has taught at conservatories in Cuba, Denmark, Finland, Norway, Switzerland, Germany and Sweden. Eliel's last CD is Eliel Lazo and the Cuban Funk Machine featuring American tenor saxophonist Bob Mintzer and a lineup of Cuban, Danish and Swedish musicians. This CD is a tribute to 70s funk and Cuban songo. His inspiration came from bands such as Irakere, The Headhunters, The Meters and especially Los Van Van. The CD was nominated to the 2015 Cuban Grammys Cubadisco and was nominated for two Danish Grammys (Danish Music Awards) World and Jazz. The CD was dedicated to master Jose Luis Quintana, better known as Changuito (January 18th, 1948 - June 6th, 2025), and Juan Formell (August 2, 1942 - May 1, 2014).

In 2019, Lazo released the single "Headlines", featuring Danish guitarist and multi-instrumentalist Zac Celinder, who was credited as Zacharias Williams Celinder. Their collaboration developed into the Eliel Lazo Trio, comprising Lazo on percussion and vocals, Zac Celinder on guitar and Kjeld Lauritsen on Hammond organ. In 2021, the trio released the ten-track album AfroCuban Chill Out, featuring Zac Celinder on guitar.

Lazo and Zac Celinder continued their collaboration in several live configurations. In 2024, Zac Celinder played guitar in Lazo's Cuban Quintet during Vinterjazz. During Vinterjazz 2025, Zac Celinder played guitar and sang in an Eliel Lazo ensemble featuring singer Stine Hjelm and organist Martin Schack. On 12 July 2026, Zac Celinder played guitar in Lazo's ensemble featuring American singer Myra Washington at the closing event of the Copenhagen Jazz Festival.

== Discography ==
- Art Ensemble of Havana (2004)
- Blanco Y Negro (2005)
- Eliel Lazo - El Conguero (2010)
- Eliel Lazo's Copenhagen Social Club (2014)
- Eliel Lazo & The Cuban Funk Machine (2014)
- AfroCuban Chill Out (2021), with Kjeld Lauritsen and Zac Celinder

== Educator ==
- 2004 Danish Jazz Federation, Vallekilde Højskole Summer Jazz Session (DK)
- 2005 Danish Jazz Federation, Vallekilde Højskole Summer Jazz Session (DK)
- 2004 - 2015 Rhythmic Music Conservatory Copenhagen, Aarhus, Aalborg and Odense Conservatorium (DK)
- Turku (FI)
- Amadeo Roldan and Cuban National Art Schools - ENA (CU)
- Zürich University of Arts (ZHDK)
- Luzern University Jazz Department (SWI)
- Stockholm Royal College of Music (SE)

== Recordings ==
- Danish Radio Big Band: ''Cuban Flavour'' (2004)
- Havana Ensemble: ''Andante'' (2005)
- Mikkel Nordsø: 7 Steps to Heaven (2007)
- Marvin Diz: ''Habla el tambor'' (2008)
- Hanne Boel: ''The Shining of things'' (2011)
- Danish Radio Big Band: ''Spirituals'' (2014)
- Kylie Minogue: ''Kiss Me Once'' (2014)
- Yasser Pino & The Latin Syndicate: ''Natura'' (2014)
- Mikkel Nordsø: "Diving in Space for 3 Decades" (2015)
- Michael Bladt: ''Next Step'' (Gateway Music)
- Gerard Presencer and DR Big Band: ''Groove Travels'' (2016)
- Michel Camilo Big Band: ''ESSENCE'' (2019)

== Endorsements ==
- Gon Bops Percussion
- Innovative Percussion
- Sabian Cymbals
- Remo Heads
- Yamaha Drums and Hardware

== Personal life ==
Eliel Lazo loves practicing sports, especially baseball, basketball and boxing. He also loves watching Mixed Martial Arts (MMA).

As a kid, Eliel was a Greco-Roman wrestler from his hometown team in Marianao, Havana.

He also has a technical career degree in economies.
