= Bob Malone discography =

Bob Malone is an American musician who has recorded both solo and as a session musician for several notable artists, including Ringo Starr and John Fogerty, with whom he has toured and recorded since 2011.

Malone has released eight studio albums, beginning with 1996's The Darkest Part of the Night.

== Albums ==
=== Studio albums ===
Year	Album	Label
1996	The Darkest Part of the Night	Chartmaker
1998	Bob Malone	Chartmaker
2001	Like It or Not	CDFreedom
2005	Born Too Late	Delta Moon/Burnside
2008	Ain’t What You Know	Delta Moon/Burnside
2015	Mojo Deluxe	Delta Moon/Burnside
2018	The Christmas Collection	Delta Moon/Burnside
2021	Good People	Delta Moon/Burnside

=== Live albums ===
Year	Album	Label
2003	Malone Alone	Delta Moon/Burnside
2015	Mojo Live: Live at the Grand Annex	Appaloosa Records

=== Live video albums ===
Year	Album	Label
2015	Mojo Live	Delta Moon/Burnside

=== Compilations ===
Year	Album	Label
1996	He’s Alright: A Tribute to Loudon Wainwright III	
1996	Acoustic Alliance, Vol. 3	Lyric Moon
1997	The Performing Songwriter Editor's Choice Top 12 DIY's, Vol. 4	The Performing Songwriter
2000	WDIY FM Studio Sessions, Vol. 1	Bummer Tent Productions
2012	No Cover Charge — WWOZ on CD	Friends of WWOZ, Inc.

== Singles ==
=== Solo singles ===
Year	Single	Album	Label
2001	"I Know He’s Your Husband"/"Goodbye L.A."	The Darkest Part of the Night	Delta Moon
2004	"You’re A Mean One, Mr Grinch"/"The After Christmas Song"	The Christmas Collection	Delta Moon
2007	"Halloween"	N/A	Delta Moon/Burnside
2018	"Memory Motel" (with Shaun Murphy)	N/A	Snapped River Records
2019	"Good People"	N/A	Delta Moon/Burnside
2021	"My Friends and I"	Good People	Delta Moon/Burnside
2021	"Tangled Up in Blue"	Good People	Delta Moon/Burnside
2021	"The River Gives"	Good People	Delta Moon/Burnside

== As sideman or guest ==
=== Albums ===
Year	Artist	Album	Label
1999	Mary Gauthier	Drag Queens in Limousines	In The Black Records
1999	Darryl Purpose	Traveler’s Code	Tangible Music
2000	Barbara Kessler	Barbara Kessler	Purple Turtle
2002	Todd Thibaud	Squash	Tone Cool
2005	The Bobs	Rhapsody in Bob	The Bobs
2005	Dave’s True Story	Nature	Bebop
2007	Jonny Blu	In Just That Kind of a Mood	Dao Feng
2008	Jonny Blu	In a Groove	Dao Feng
2009	Jonny Blu	Taboo!	Peer Music Publishing
2013	John Fogerty	Wrote a Song for Everyone	Vanguard Records
2014	Dan Navarro	Shed My Skin	Red Hen Records
2017	Ringo Starr	Give More Love	UME
2019	John Fogerty	50 Year Trip Live at Red Rocks	BMG Rights Management
2019	Bobby Messano feat. Bob Malone	Lemonade	Fishhead Records
2019	Wanda’s World	Wanda's World — Studio Cast Recording	Broadway Records

=== Singles ===
Year	Artist	Song	Label
2010	Jonny Blu	"Holiday for Two"	Dao Feng
2017	Avril Lavigne feat. Jonny Blu	"Baby, It’s Cold Outside"	[Unknown]
