= The Ukulele Experience, Volume One =

The Ukulele Experience, Vol. One

Studio album by Jonny Blu
- Released: July 20, 2012 (U.S.)
- Recorded: 2012; Dao Feng Music Studios (Toluca Lake, California, USA)
- Genre: Pop, Folk, ukulele, Standards
- Length: 37:12
- Label: Dao Feng Music/Jonny Blu Music
- Producer: Jonny Blu, Myke Aaron

Jonny Blu chronology
Taboo! (2009)	The Ukulele Experience, Vol. One (2012)

The Ukulele Experience, Vol. One is the fourth studio album (in the U.S) by singer-songwriter Jonny Blu, released in the United States on July 20, 2012, by Dao Feng Music. It is Jonny Blu's first album of ukulele based folk and pop music and contains a mix of original songs by Jonny Blu and some pop standards. The album was recorded in 2012 at Dao Feng Studios in Toluca Lake, California and was mixed and mastered by Myke Aaron at Soundcubed Studios in Hollywood, CA.

== Track listing ==
1. "You Feel Right" – 2:43
2. "You Belong to Me" – 3:11
3. "Because" – 2:45
4. "Be My Valentine" – 3:04
5. "We Belong Together (feat. Kate Micucci)" – 3:23
6. "Hey Jonny, Open Your Eyes (feat. Kate Micucci)" – 0:22
7. "Someone Like You" – 3:49
8. "Happy Go Lucky Guy" – 3:18
9. "Ooh Wee (Ukulele Version)" – 2:54
10. "Over the Rainbow" – 3:13
11. "THGTC (Things Have Got to Change)" – 3:16
12. "Always Look on the Bright Side of Life" – 3:11
13. "Your Birthday Song (Ukulele Version)" – 2:10

== Personnel ==
=== Musicians ===
- Jonny Blu – vocals, ukulele, music arrangements, background vocals, chromatic harmonica, percussion, bongo drums, kazoo
- Ryan Roberts – bass
- Kate Micucci – vocals, ukulele
- Skip Stellrecht – ukulele, background vocals
- Bob Malone – accordion
- Jacqueline Piñol – background vocals

=== Production ===
- Myke Aaron – producer, engineer, mixing
- Jonny Blu – producer, engineer, mixing
- Jonny Blu – artwork, photography, album package design
