= In the Groove =

In the Groove may refer to:

== Music ==
- "In the Groove" (composition), a classic jazz composition by Mary Lou Williams
- In the Groove (Marvin Gaye album), 1968
- In the Groove (Planet Drum album), 2022
- In the Groove, album by Jim Messina, 2017
- In the Groove, album by Barry Goldberg, 2018
- "In the Groove", song by Enuff Z'Nuff from Enuff Z'nuff, 1989

== Other uses ==
- In the Groove (video game), a music video game produced by Roxor
  - In the Groove 2, the sequel
- In the Groove (horse) (foaled 1987), a British Thoroughbred racehorse

== See also ==
- In a Groove, a 2008 album by Jonny Blu
- Down in the Groove, a 1988 album by Bob Dylan
- "Into the Groove", a song by Madonna
