= List of South Korean films of 1949 =

This is a list of films produced in South Korea in 1949.

Released	English title	Korean title	Director	Cast	Genre	Notes
1949
February 9	A Hometown in Heart	마음의 고향	Yun Yong-gyu		Drama	
March 21	Motherland	조국의 어머니	Yun Dae-ryong		Drama	
April 9	A Diary of Woman	여성일기	Hong Seong-ki		Drama	
April 30	The Spirit of Goguryeo	고구려의 혼	Yim Woon-hak		Historical	
May 10	Documentary of Baek Beom's Public Funeral	백범 국민장 실기	Yun Bong-chun		Documentary	
June 7	A Patriot's Son	애국자의 아들	Yun Bong-chun		Drama	
June 25	The Son of the Earth	대지의 아들	Shin Kyeong-gyun		Melodrama	
July 1	Wind and Waves	풍랑	Woo Hyun		Melodrama	
August 5	A Fellow Soldier	전우	Hong Gae-myeong		Anticommunism	
August 13	A Journey of Youth	청춘행로	Jang Hwang-yeon		Melodrama	
August 15	The Blue Hill	푸른 언덕	Yu Dong-il		Musical	
September 24	Pilot An Chang-Nam	안창남 비행사	No Pil		Biographical	
October 4	Breaking the Wall	성벽을 뚫고	Han Hyung-mo		Anticommunism	
October 5	For the Country	나라를 위하여	Ahn Jong-hwa		Anticommunism	
October 12	The reality of the North Korea	북한의 실정	Lee Chang-chun		Documentary	
November 1	A Mother	돌아온 어머니	Lee Gye-ha		Drama	
November 15	Pasi	파시	Choi In-kyu		Drama	
December 10	The Collapsed 38th Parallel	무너진 삼팔선	Yun Bong-chun		Documentary	
	A Herd boy and a Golden Watch	목동과 금시계	Lee Yong-min		Drama	
	A Judge	심판자	Kim Seong-min		Drama	
	An Old Clown	늙은 광대	Gang Mun-su			
	The Korean Textile Co.	고려방직	Bang Ui-seok		Documentary	
