= Dump truck (disambiguation) =

A dump truck is a truck used for hauling loose material.

Dump truck may also refer to:

- Dumptruck (band) for the 80s indie band
- Dump truck, slang for large buttocks
- Dump Truck, a song by Blind Melon on their album Soup
- The Dump Truck, a nickname of sumo wrestler Konishiki Yasokichi
- "Dumptruck" Song by hip-hop group: Kinfolk Thugs
