= Glimmer (album) =

Studio album by Kevin Salem
- Released: 1996
- Genre: Rock
- Label: Roadrunner
- Producer: Niko Bolas

Kevin Salem chronology
Soma City (1994)	Glimmer (1996)	Ecstatic (2001)

Glimmer is an album by the American musician Kevin Salem, released in 1996. Salem supported the album by opening for the Connells on a North American tour.

== Production ==
The album was produced by Niko Bolas. Frank Sampedro played guitar on several tracks; David Mansfield played steel guitar on "Trouble". Todd Thibaud also contributed to Glimmer. Salem was attracted to depressing subject matter and strove to capture a "sloppy" sound in the studio.

== Critical reception ==
Professional ratings
Review scores
Source	Rating
AllMusic	4.5/5 stars
Boston Herald	3/4 stars
The Encyclopedia of Popular Music	3/5 stars
Orlando Sentinel	4/5 stars
The Tampa Tribune	3/4 stars

The Washington City Paper thought that "the scrupulously tailored verse-chorus cadence of Glimmer's anthems feels so immediately familiar that Salem could probably make a mint ghost-writing for Tom Petty." The Austin Chronicle stated that "Glimmer is loaded with big guitars—chunky, Seventies-style arena-rock rhythms (think Joe Perry sans high-dollar production) with indie tones and guitar-noodling solos." The Tampa Tribune wrote: "Tom Petty with indie credibility for those hipsters who are too embarrassed to admit that Damn the Torpedoes rocks."

Stewart Lee, of The Sunday Times, declared that "beautiful, compelling, nerve-shattering lead-guitar lines snake and spiral over clean and uncluttered rhythm parts, never resorting to simple effects-pedal overload"; Lee later listed Glimmer as the best album of 1996. The St. Paul Pioneer Press thought that "Salem's tough/tender tunes, guitar wizardry and no-frills, all-thrills band just might set you on an endless road trip." The Boston Herald deemed it "a screamer of an album that works the intersection of heartland rock 'n' roll and guitar-driven alternative rock." The Press-Telegram considered Glimmer to be the fifth best album of 1996.

AllMusic wrote that Salem's "serious but not humorless lyrics have an almost novelistic detail to them, especially on the haunting 'Chemical Night Train', and the band ... rocks throughout."

== Track listing ==
No.	Title	Length
1.	"Run Run Run"
2.	"Innocence"
3.	"Pray for Rain"
4.	"Chemical Night Train"
5.	"Underneath"
6.	"Sleep"
7.	"Number Seven"
8.	"All on Trial"
9.	"Always"
10.	"Damned"
11.	"Trouble"
12.	"Destructible"
