= For the Country =

Studio album by Dumptruck
- Released: 1987
- Genre: Guitar pop, folk rock, country rock
- Label: Big Time
- Producer: Hugh Jones

Dumptruck chronology
Positively Dumptruck (1986)	For the Country (1987)	Days of Fear (1994)

For the Country is the third album by the American band Dumptruck, released in 1987. The first single was "Going Nowhere". The band supported the album with North American and European tours. It sold around 35,000 copies in its initial release, prior to Dumptruck's lawsuit against Big Time Records. For the Country was reissued in 2003.

== Production ==
Produced by Hugh Jones, the album was recorded in Wales. The band lost two members prior to the recording sessions, with Kevin Salem and Tom Shad joining on guitar and bass, respectively. Salem was attracted to the band because they encouraged an expansive Neil Young-sprawl to his playing. Singer and guitar player Seth Tiven, who was influenced primarily by the songwriting of Phil Ochs and the Stooges, wrote most of the songs, and felt that the band was more open to trying new things in the studio. Tiven thought that he wrote more when he was depressed. B. J. Cole contributed on pedal steel.

== Critical reception ==
Professional ratings
Review scores
Source	Rating
AllMusic	4.5/5 stars
Alternative Rock	5/10
The Baltimore Sun	2.5/5 stars
Boston Herald	3/4 stars
Hartford Advocate	4.5/5 stars
Omaha World-Herald	4.5/5 stars
Rolling Stone	3/5 stars

The Boston Globe noted that "at times [the album] evokes the spirit of the Byrds' late-60's psychedelic classic, Notorious Byrd Brothers." The St. Petersburg Times concluded that the band "does English guitar pop better than most of its counterparts across the Atlantic." The Vancouver Sun labeled For the Country "a guitar-drenched dream, with soft, languid vocals and oodles of ringing guitar sounds." The Baltimore Sun lamented the absence of cofounder Kirk Swan.

The Toronto Star praised the "electric country-rock with definite psychedelic overtones." The Gazette stated, "For the Country is virtually alone among recent rock releases in any sub-genre, a collection of songs that derives its power from thematic unification and quiet energy." Mark Jenkins, of The Washington Post, listed the album among the ten best of 1987, calling it "spare, bittersweet but tuneful folk-rock".

The Trouser Press Record Guide called For the Country "involving and unsettling". In 2004, the Evansville Courier & Press opined that the album contained "the seeds of both the Gin Blossoms' jangle-pop and the Jayhawks' alternative country rock."

== Track listing ==
No.	Title	Length
1.	"Island"
2.	"50 Miles"
3.	"Friends"
4.	"Carefree"
5.	"Brush Me Back"
6.	"Hung Out on a Line"
7.	"Going Nowhere"
8.	"For the Country"
9.	"Dead Weight"
10.	"Wire"
11.	"Barking Up the Wrong Tree"
