= Bob Malone =

American songwriter

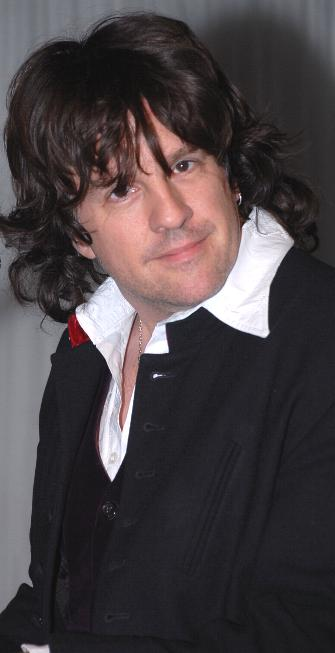
- Bob Malone in 2007

Background information
- Born: Robert Maurice Meloon; December 2, 1965 (age 60)
- Origin: Milton, New Jersey, United States
- Genres: Blues; rock
- Occupation: Singer-songwriter
- Instruments: Keyboards; vocals
- Years active: 1990–present
- Label: Delta Moon Records
- Website: www.bobmalone.com

Robert Maurice Malone (born as Meloon on December 2, 1965) is an American keyboardist, singer, and songwriter. He has toured extensively as a solo artist as well as with former Creedence Clearwater Revival frontman John Fogerty, and has recorded with such artists as Fogerty, Ringo Starr, and Avril Lavigne. His version of "You’re a Mean One, Mr. Grinch" was used in the promotion of the 2018 film The Grinch.

== Early life ==
Malone was born in Irvington, New Jersey, and grew up in the Milton section of Jefferson Township, New Jersey, after being adopted in 1966. He began playing piano at age 9 and, as a teenager, studied with Ashley Miller, best known for his recordings as the house organist at Radio City Music Hall. At 14, he was drawn to rock and roll after hearing Billy Joel’s ‘’Scenes from an Italian Restaurant’’ and The Beatles’ Sgt. Pepper's Lonely Hearts Club Band.

Malone played bassoon in the school orchestra and, while still in middle school, taught himself to play tuba, eventually performing with the high school marching band. He formed his first band, High Altitude, in his sophomore year of high school, along with friend Paul (Buzz) Burrowes.

After graduating from Jefferson Township High School, he and Burrowes moved to Boston in 1984 to attend Berklee College of Music. They continued to play gigs in New Jersey, flying home every weekend. In 1986, Malone was the winner of the Berklee Singer/Songwriter Showcase. While still at Berklee, Malone formed the band Bob Meloon and the Big Argument with fellow Berklee classmates Phil Antoniades (who later went on to start the company Nimbit) and Gene Shimosato. Starting with a 1987 debut show at The Channel in Boston, the band developed a following in the city's rock scene and toured the New England rock-club circuit. The band was noted in the press for having a multi-racial, multinational makeup. Their 1988 release, First Flash of Success, was favorably received by critics and received airplay around New England. Songs from the CD won the KISS 108 FM Local Music Spotlight twice and received airplay on Boston rock station WBCN.

== Career ==
=== 1989-1990 ===
In 1989, Bob Meloon & the Big Argument was invited to play the song "Nobody’s Child," which Malone wrote based on his experience being adopted, at the Massachusetts State House for then-governor Michael Dukakis and members of the state legislature for a ceremony commemorating State Adoption Week.

One of the band's final shows before breaking up was a benefit concert in 1990 to raise money for the installation of a recording studio at Malone's alma mater, Jefferson Township High School in New Jersey.

The band broke up in 1990 and Malone moved to Los Angeles that same year.

=== 1991-2000 ===
Around the time Malone moved to Los Angeles, he began performing as Bob Malone. He moved away from the pop-rock sound of his former band and developed a style that combined blues, New Orleans piano, and singer-songwriter craftsmanship. He initially supporting himself in bars and restaurants, playing covers and top-40.

He was named to Music Connection’s Best Unsigned Artists list for five years in a row before securing a deal with Criterion Music Publishing in 1992. It was at Criterion that Malone began his long association with Florida State University Poet in Residence Michael Rothenberg, with whom he has co-written songs that have appeared on three of Malone’s albums. The two performed live together numerous times, including on the Rockpile on the Road tour with legendary beat poet David Meltzer.

In 1993, Malone joined Freddy Fender’s band for a short tour.

In 1996, he released his first solo album, The Darkest Part Of The Night, with Chartmaker Records. The album, which was recorded live in one day with his band at 3rd Encore Studios in Los Angeles, received positive reviews and placement in several critics’ top-10 lists. Songs from the album were featured on NPR’s Car Talk and Acoustic Café.

After the release of The Darkest Part Of The Night, Malone began to tour as a solo performer, first as an opening act and later as a headliner. He went on to win the Boston Acoustic Underground Award for best male performer in 1995 and Falcon Ridge Folk Festival New Artist Competition in 1996, and placed as a finalist at Kerrville Folk Festival in 1995 and 1996. Also during this time, he played his first show with a major act, opening for Boz Scaggs in San Diego before a crowd of 10,000.

The year 1998 saw the release of Malone's second Chartmaker release, Bob Malone, followed by tour dates opening for the Neville Brothers, Average White Band, Vonda Shepard, The Manhattan Transfer, and Al Green, as well as his first solo tours in Italy and Japan.

=== 2001-2010 ===
Malone spent portions of the year 2000 living in New York City and 2001 living in New Orleans. By this time, he was touring extensively as a headliner. His 2001 album, Like It Or Not, enjoyed positive reviews.

In 2002, Malone contributed an essay about life as an independent musician to the book Working Musicians: Defining Moments from the Road, the Studio, and the Stage, published by HarperCollins and featuring contributions by musicians such as Harry Connick Jr., Jerry Garcia, Paul Simon, John Lee Hooker, Keith Richards, Carole King, Randy Newman and Leonard Cohen. That same year, he opened for Arlo Guthrie.

In 2003, he released his fourth album, the live solo Malone Alone. Recorded live at concerts in Santa Cruz, California; Boston; Atlanta; Bethlehem, Pennsylvania; and New Paltz, New York; the album was his first to appear on radio play charts, appearing on the Living Blues and Roots Music Report charts.

Malone's fifth album, Born Too Late, was released in December 2005, and featured Blues Music Awards winners Paul Rishell and Annie Raines. It was a critical success, with American Songwriter calling it "one for the ages" and Malone himself "a pianist’s pianist." Music Connection called him "an insightful lyricist who deserves a larger audience." That same year, Malone played piano on the album Rhapsody in Bob by Grammy-nominated a capella group The Bobs and joined them on tour.

His 2009 album, Ain’t What You Know, was his first to use prominent Los Angeles session musicians, including drummer Mike Baird and bassist Leland Sklar.

Malone played piano on Jonny Blu albums In Just That Kind of a Mood and In a Groove, and was pianist and arranger on Taboo!, produced by Peermusic. Malone and Blu co-wrote the 2010 single "Holiday for Two," which was featured in several television and film soundtracks.

Between 2000 and 2010, Malone's songs were featured on JAG, The Young and the Restless, All My Children, Cupid, and the Travel Channel. He has composed instrumental music for Dr. Phil, Rachael Ray, and Entertainment Tonight and performed live twice on The Price Is Right.

=== 2011-present ===
In 2011, Malone was invited to join John Fogerty's band and has performed and toured with him ever since. Since then, Malone has continued to maintain his solo tour schedule in addition to his duties playing keyboards with Fogerty. As a solo artist, he has played WWOZ Piano Night during the New Orleans Jazz & Heritage Festival; Musikfest in Bethlehem, Pennsylvania; Cincy Blues Fest, Glastonbury Festival, Long Beach Bayou Festival, Umbria Jazz Festival, HB Town Music Festival in China, and Australia's Blue Mountains Music Festival and Narooma Blues Festival. As a member of Fogerty's band, he has played a set in Hyde Park, London, where Bruce Springsteen joined the band in front of a crowd of 75,000 people. He is featured on Fogerty's 2019 live DVD/album 50 Year Trip: Live at Red Rocks and has appeared with Fogerty's band on Good Morning America, The View, and The Late Show With David Letterman.

In 2015, Malone released his eighth album, Mojo Deluxe, to positive reviews. American Songwriter called it "a new masterpiece" while the Myrtle Beach Sun News named it the best blues album of the year. The album saw Malone introduce the stomp box into his sound and, as on his previous album, use prominent session musicians, including bassist Tim Lefebvre and drummer Kenny Aronoff. The album went to #1 on the Independent British Blues Broadcasters (IBBA) radio chart, was one of the top 100 most-played records of 2015 on the Roots Music Report radio charts, and was top 15 on the Jambands/Relix charts.

In 2018, Malone's recording of "You’re a Mean One, Mr. Grinch" was used in the trailers for the Universal Pictures/Illumination movie The Grinch and was featured on his holiday album, The Christmas Collection, which made the Roots Music Report 2019 Top Holiday Albums chart.

Malone's recording activity since 2011 has included keyboard work on John Fogerty's Wrote a Song for Everyone, Ringo Starr's Give More Love, the Netflix series Lucifer, and Avril Lavigne and Jonny Blu's recording of "Baby, It’s Cold Outside" for the soundtrack of the Hallmark Channel movie Switched for Christmas, on which he played piano and wrote the orchestra and big band arrangement.

Malone's 2021 release, Good People, went to No. 1 (Soft Rock), No. 1 (New Jersey), and No. 11 (Rock) on the Roots Music Report radio charts and debuted at No. 15 on the IBBA charts. Elmore Magazine wrote: "Bob Malone is a soulful songwriter, passionate singer, exuberant piano player and ecstatic performer whose astounding, abounding talents are immediately evident throughout 11 inspired and inspiring songs on his glorious ninth album, Good People." In its review of the album, American Songwriter said: "From complex turbo-charged polyrhythmic soul-jazz excursions to the most fundamental folk-rock anthems, Malone knows how to light it on fire."

== Awards ==
- 1995 Boston Acoustic Underground Award (Best Male Performer)
- 1996 Falcon Ridge Folk Festival (New Artist Competition)
- 1995 Kerrville Folk Festival (finalist)
- 1996 Kerrville Folk Festival (finalist)
- 1996 Napa Valley Folk Festival (finalist, New Artist)
- 1997 Great American Love Song Competition ("Where My Heart Will Be Found")

== Personal life ==
On June 1, 2003, Malone married singer-songwriter-turned-L.A. County deputy public defender Karen Nash, who also performs background vocals on some of his songs. He wrote the song "Good People" for her.
