= Cincy Blues Fest =

Music festival in Cincinnati, Ohio, US

- Formation: 1992
- Type: 501(c)3
- Legal status: Annual Event
- Purpose: Education/Entertainment
- Location: Cincinnati, Ohio, United States
- Region served: Midwest
- Director: Joy (Henderson) Dziech
- Parent organization: Cincy Blues Society
- Affiliations: The Blues Foundation
- Staff: 40+ (volunteer)
- Volunteers: 530+
- Website: Cincy Blues Fest

Cincy Blues Fest is an annual blues music festival, held on the banks of the Ohio River in Cincinnati, Ohio, United States. It is believed to be the largest all-volunteer blues festival in the U.S. Over the years it has showcased such acts as Lonnie Mack, Otis Rush, Clarence Gatemouth Brown, Lil' Ed & the Blues Imperials, Bobby Rush, Reverend Peyton's Big Damn Band, Watermelon Slim & the Workers, Slick Ballinger, the Chicago Allstars, Bob Seeley, Big Joe Duskin, Ricky Nye, and Sonny Moorman.

The festival was originally called the Queen City Blues Fest, when the parent organization was called the Queen City Blues Society. These names changed in 1993 to Cincy Blues Fest and Cincy Blues Society, respectively. These changes were in name only, the organization remained the same. The festival is also often erroneously referred to as the Cincinnati Blues Festival, Cincinnati, Blues Fest, Cincy Blues Festival, and/or the Cincinnati Queen City Blues Festival.

== Festival details ==
Cincy Blues Fest is held every summer at Sawyer Point Park, on the banks of the Ohio River, in Cincinnati. On Friday, the festival gates usually open at 5:00pm and the music starts at 5:30pm. On Saturday the doors open at 2:30pm, and the music starts at 3:15pm. Music continues until midnight, both nights.

The festival usually consists of three to four stages running simultaneously in different parts of the park. On Friday, there is the Main Stage at the P&G Pavilion, the "themed" Stage (each year a different theme is chosen) under the arches of the Purple People Bridge, and the Local Stage in the lawn east of the Daniel Carter Beard/I-471 Bridge. On Saturday there is the Main Stage, Arches Boogie Woogie Piano Stage, and the Local Stage.

The 'Main Stage' is populated with national and regional blues acts, as well as two local acts that are the winners of that year's 'Cincy Blues Challenge'. The 'St. Vincent De Paul Local Stage' is made up of the runners-up of that year's challenge, as well as a local all-star jam session at the end of the night on Saturday.

The 'Arches Boogie Woogie Piano Stage' host boogie woogie piano players from around the world, and is also the venue for the 'International Boogie Woogie Hall of Fame' awards, with a new member inducted each year on that stage.

On Friday, the "Arches Stage" is a themed stage featuring a different theme for each festival year. In 2007, the festival stage was named, the 'King Records Tribute Stage,' so as to feature many surviving artists that recorded on the Cincinnati-based King Records label. In 2008, the stage's theme was the 'AlternaBlues Stage', a showcase of regional and national Americana and blues-rock acts that were influenced by the blues. And in 2009, the stage will be called 'The 2009 International Blues Challenge Stage', as all the bands that will perform competed at the International Blues Challenge in Memphis.

== Latest festival ==
The 2025 festival was held on Saturday July 12 and Sunday July 13 in the Village Green Park. It was the 31st annual Cincy Blues Festival according to the festival organizing site.

== Recent festivals ==
- No event was held in 2020. The 2020 event was deferred to 2021.
- The 2008 event "Sweet Sixteen" was held on August 1–2 at Sawyer Point in Cincinnati.
- The 2007 event "Once in a Blues Moon" was held on August 3–4 at Sawyer Point in Cincinnati.
- The 2006 event was held July 28–29 at Sawyer Point in Cincinnati.
