= Kevin Salem =

American singer-songwriter and record producer

Kevin Salem is an American singer-songwriter, guitarist, and record producer. He began his career as a member of Dumptruck, and subsequently played with multiple artists on tour, including Yo La Tengo and Freedy Johnston, before beginning his solo career.

== Biography ==
Salem grew up in Johnstown, Pennsylvania, where he decided he wanted to be a successful guitarist. Most of the bands in his hometown were cover bands, but he became interested in other types of music after traveling to New York City, where he saw Hüsker Dü, Tommy Keene, and The Replacements. His musical career began when he joined Dumptruck in 1986, after which he performed on their 1987 album For the Country (though not on any of their other albums). During the early 1990s, he became a touring and session guitarist who played for numerous artists, including Yo La Tengo, Freedy Johnston, and Chris Harford. He has also done session work for the Pooh Sticks, and produced albums by Giant Sand, Chocolate Genius, and Madder Rose.

=== Solo career ===
Salem released his first solo album, Soma City, on Roadrunner Records in 1994. It was followed two years later by Glimmer, which was also released on Roadrunner Records. He released his third solo album, Ecstatic, in 2001. Artists who made cameos on Ecstatic included Vicki Peterson, Donovan, and Alice Temple.

== Critical reception ==
Peter Margasak, of Chicago Reader, wrote that Soma City was "impressive", writing of Salem, "While he offers nothing especially new, his emotion-drenched work is pretty darn close to impeccable. Among endless waves of novelty, this kind of solidity can be a blessing." Patrick Kampert gave the album 3 out or 4 stars, describing it as "a strong outing, similar in texture to the Sand Rubies' stellar debut". The album appeared on multiple critics' year-end lists for 1994, and Salem tied for first place in Rolling Stone's "Best New Male Singer" poll that year.

== Discography ==
- Soma City (Roadrunner, 1994)
- Glimmer (Roadrunner, 1996)
- Ecstatic (Future Farmer, 2001)
