= Jonny Blu =

Jonny Blu 藍強 (Lan Qiang)
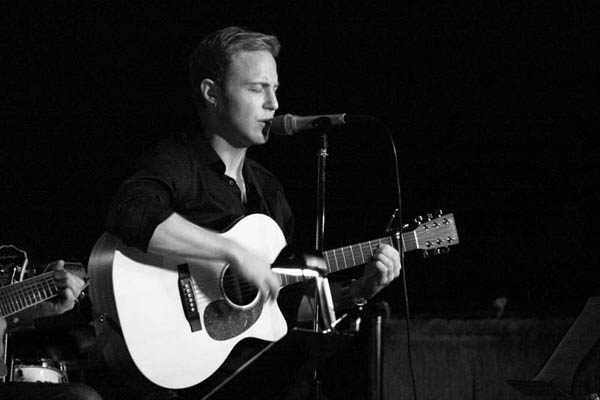
- Jonny Blu performing at Catalina Jazz Club in Hollywood, December 2007

Background information
- Born: Jonathan Scott Blu Klamer; Los Angeles, California, U.S.
- Genres: Pop, rock, jazz, folk, world music
- Occupations: Singer, songwriter, record producer
- Years active: 2001–present
- Labels: Dao Feng Music/Jonny Blu Music (US); See Music/漢星音樂 (China-Hong Kong)
- Website: jonnyblu.com

Jonny Blu is an American singer, songwriter and record producer who was born and raised in Los Angeles but made his professional debut in China. He entered the music scene in Hong Kong and became the first Caucasian pop star in the Chinese music world.

From his first Mandarin Chinese Pop album Jonny Blu-On the Edge|藍強-刀鋒, his songs "On The Edge|刀鋒", "Crossroads|十子路口", and "The Apology|對不起妳" were Top Ten hits in the Chinese Music and Music Video charts. With a style similar to that of Michael Bublé, Harry Connick Jr. and Jamie Cullum, in December 2006, he released his debut swing/pop album In Just That Kind of a Mood.

In June 2008, he released an EP titled In a Groove, co-produced with Myke Aaron. On September 8, 2009, Blu released his album Taboo!, produced by Peer Music, with arrangements by Bob Malone.

== Early life and musical beginnings ==
Blu was raised by his mother in Los Angeles. His father, Reuben Klamer (known for creating The Game of Life), lived in Marina Del Rey. When he was three years old, his parents divorced. He attended Sinai Academy in Beverly Hills, California. He displayed musical talent at an early age, having been in select vocals groups in early schooling. His mother, Shary Klamer, an actress and trained singer, taught him his basics of singing and piano. At age 10 he attended El Rodeo public school in Beverly Hills and began attending Beverly Hills High School at age 13. He began studying martial arts at age six. His musical influences came from Harry Connick Jr., Sting, Billy Joel, Elton John, and George Michael. He enjoyed entertaining whoever was around with his renditions of songs such as "We Are In Love", "Faith" and "Your Song".

== After college ==
President Bill Clinton was on a visit to China when Blu was at Peking University. A White House official contacted the EAP Program to ask about hiring non-Chinese Americans as translators. Blu and a friend, the only non-Chinese Americans who were fluent in Chinese, were chosen. After returning to the US, Blu worked part-time for the Office of White House Advance, organizing events and motorcade for President Clinton and Vice President Al Gore. He also worked for Soviet Union President Mikhail Gorbachev as a personal escort for three days at a Global Green USA Convention in 2000.

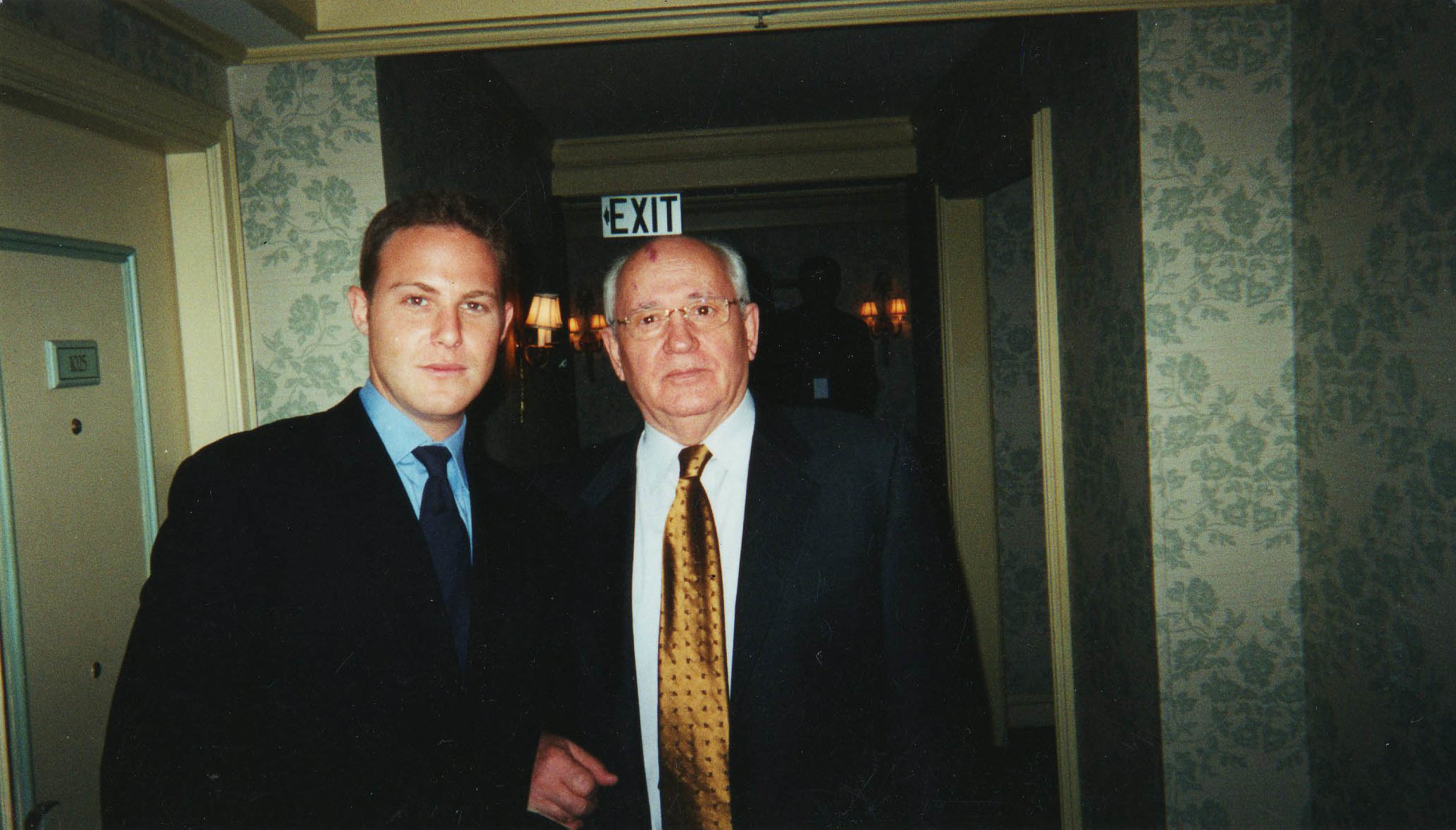
Jonny Blu and Mikhail Gorbachev - 2000

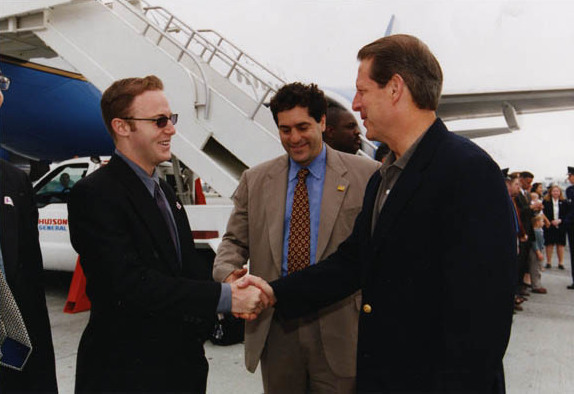
Jonny Blu and Al Gore - 1999

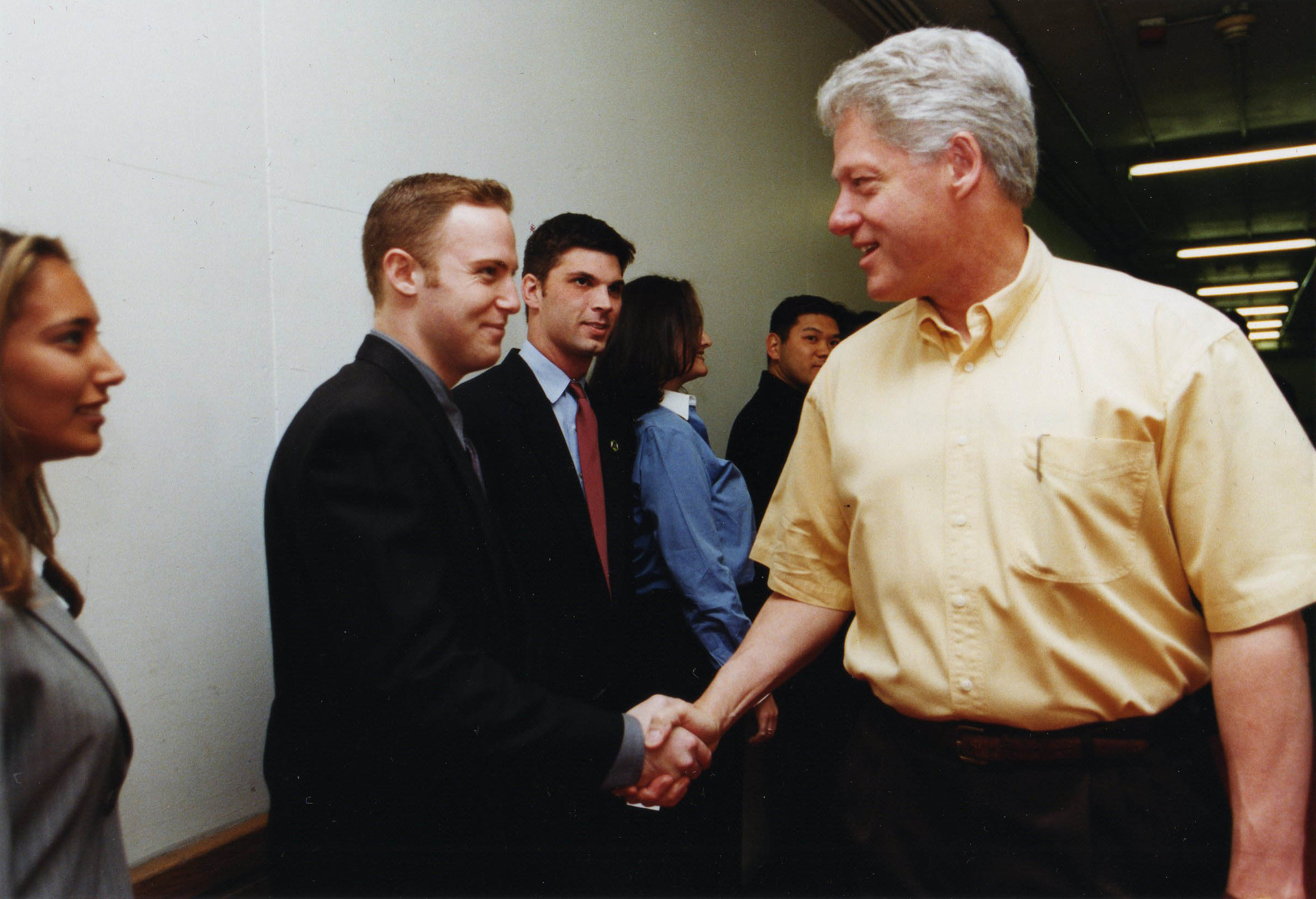
Jonny Blu and Bill Clinton - 1999

== Music career ==
=== The China pop years ===
==== The Chinese Singing Competition ====
In 2000, after returning from studying in China and graduating from UCLA, Blu was in a Monterey Park, California, music store buying Chinese pop music. On a whim, he noticed a sign-up sheet for a Chinese singing competition and he filled out the form (in Chinese) and returned it to the store manager. As the only non-Chinese contestant, Blu stunned the audience and judges with his rendition of the hit Chinese pop song "Xin Tai Ruan (心太軟)". He won and was approached afterward by an executive at the Taiwanese Television network ETTV America (part of Dong Sen Television Network, Taiwan). Through ETTV, Blu entered several other Chinese singing competitions and was a finalist in the International Finals of the CCTV Singing Competition, which took place in Arcadia, California, at The Arboretum.

==== Hong Kong ====
In 2001, intending to work with music manager Clarence Hui (許愿), Blu moved to Hong Kong. He used the Chinese name 藍強 (pronounced "Lan Qiang", meaning "Blue Strength"). After struggling for over two years performing in bars and clubs around Hong Kong and getting a couple small television commercials, he went to a meeting with Richard Denekamp, the head of Sony Music Asia. Denekamp was impressed by Blu and his preliminary recordings of his original Mandarin Chinese pop songs, and he was ready to sign Blu to a Sony Asia contract.

==== The first Caucasian Chinese pop star ====
In 2003, after signing with See Music|漢星音樂 (a subsidiary of See Corporation, Hong Kong) his career took off. He signed a five-year contract with See Music. In Hong Kong, Blu is affectionately referred to as Xiao Lan (小藍 literally meaning Little Blue). He has had two more follow up songs "Crossroads" (十子路口) and "The Apology" (對不起妳), which have reached the Top Ten in most Chinese Music charts.

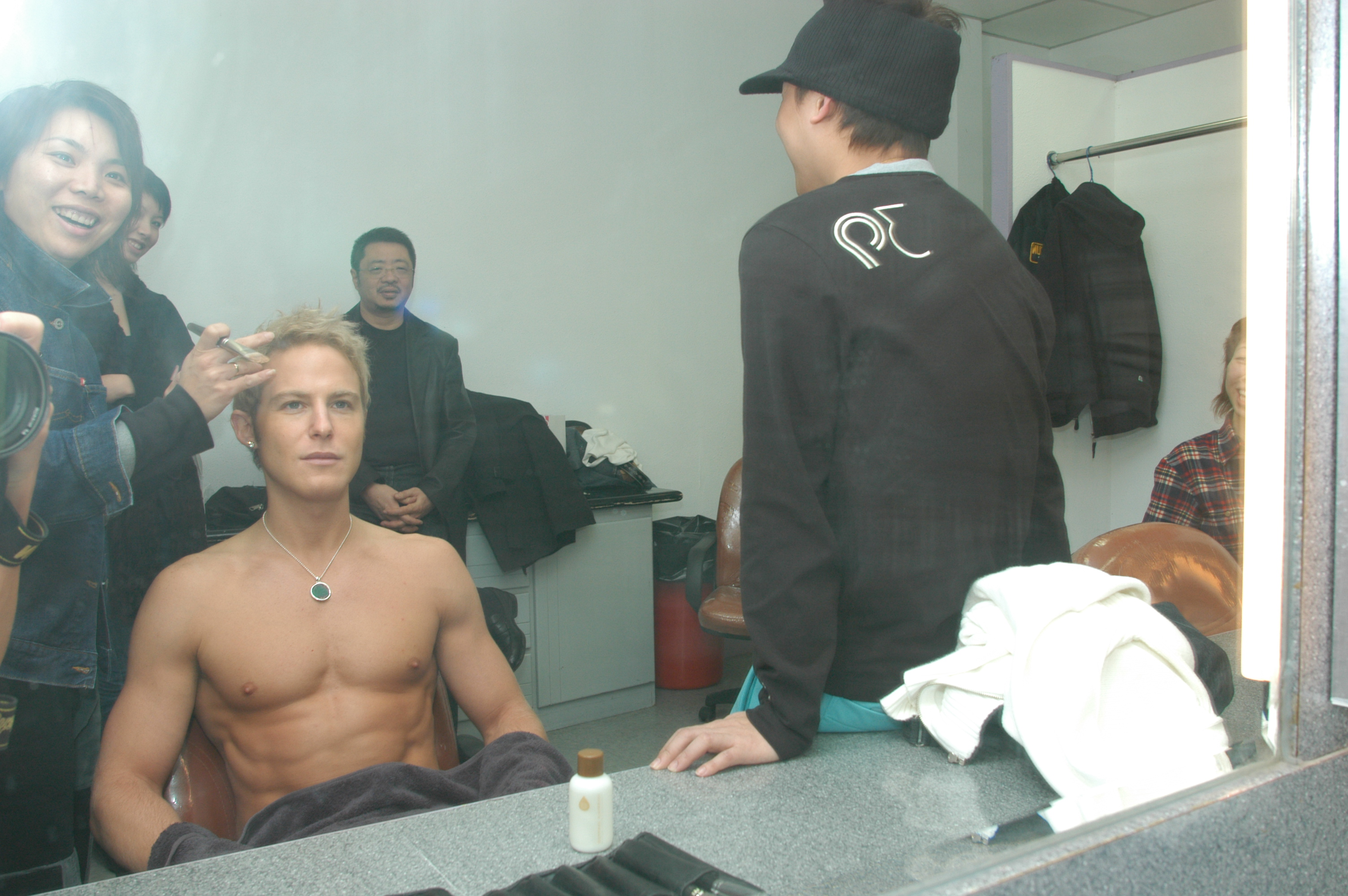
Jonny Blu music video-Hong Kong - December 2003

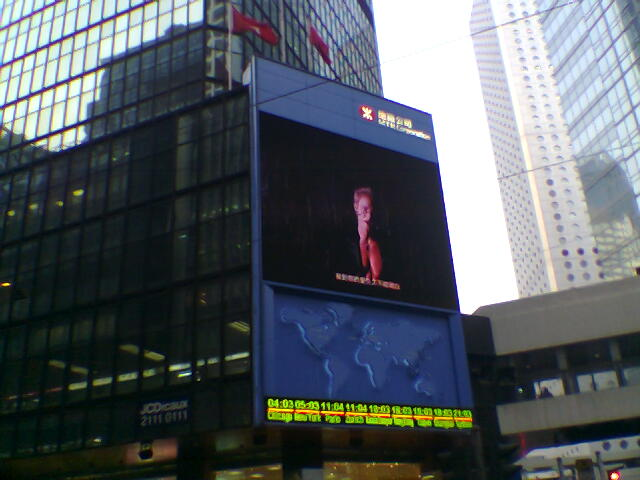
Jonny Blu on big screen-Hong Kong - February 2004

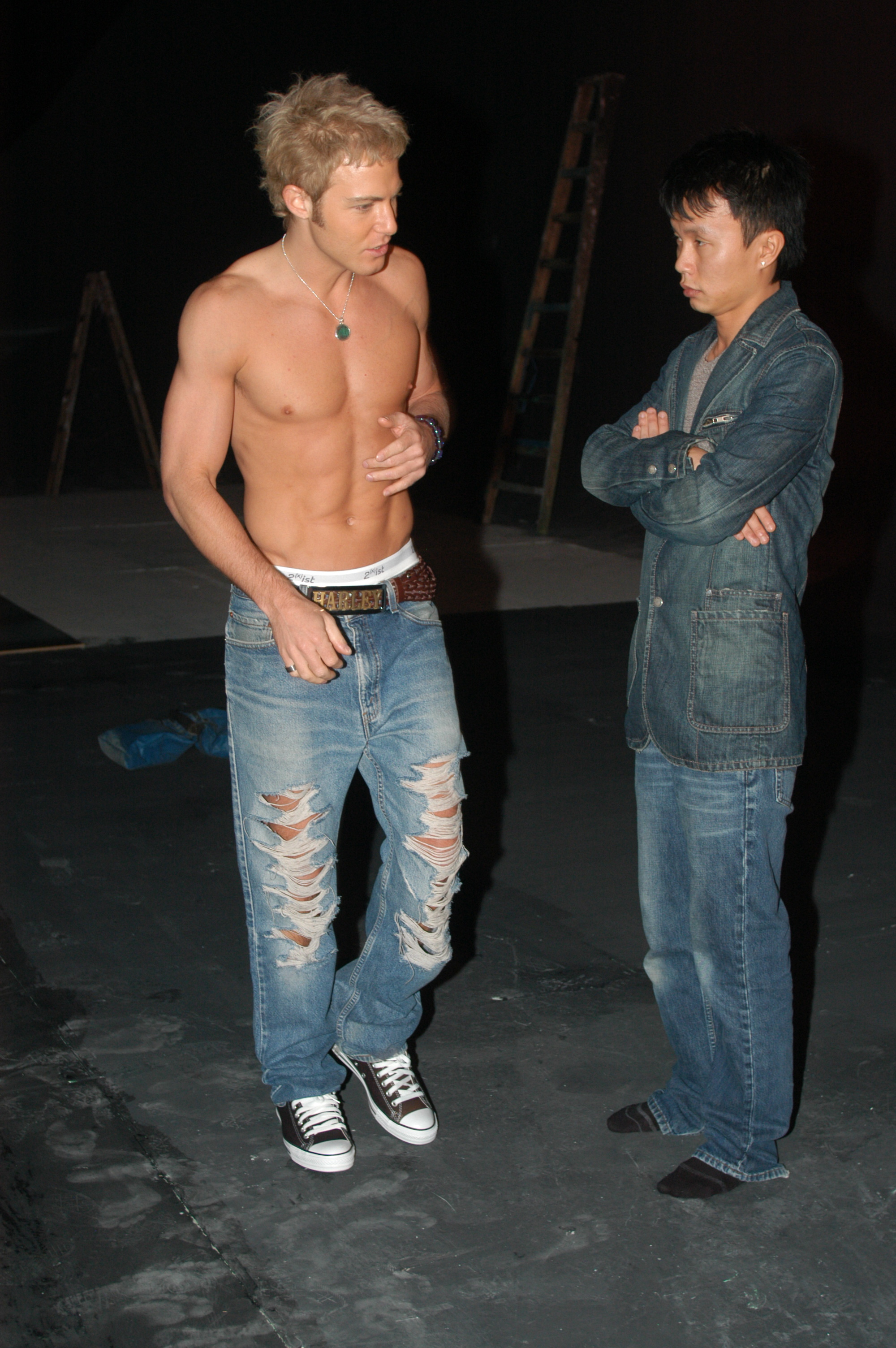
Jonny Blu music video with Director - Hong Kong - December 2003

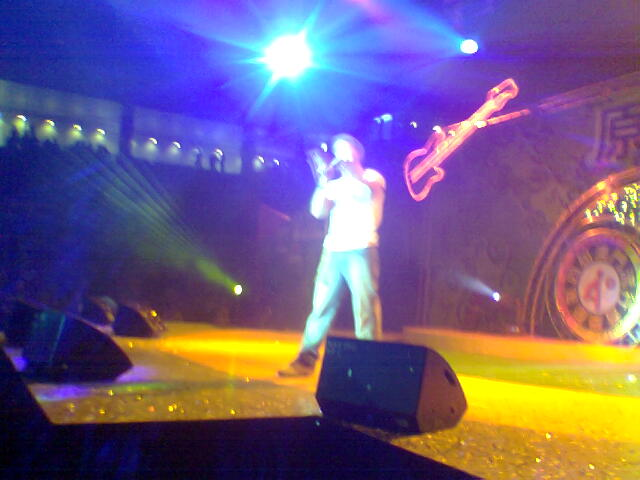
Jonny Blu performing in Macau - May 2004

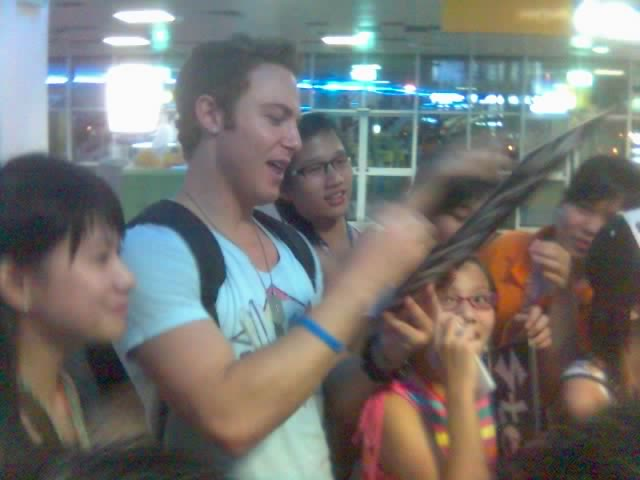
Jonny Blu signing autographs in Macau - May 2004

==== Princess Diaries 2 ====
During a holiday in Oahu, Hawaii, he met film director Garry Marshall. After discussion about a role in an upcoming film, he and Marshall met a few months later at Henderson Productions in Toluca Lake, California. Blu appeared as himself in the garden party scene of The Princess Diaries 2: Royal Engagement, singing a Mandarin Chinese version of the song "Miracles Happen" (originally sung in English by Myra in the film The Princess Diaries). Marshall and the music supervisor for the film, Dawn Soler, liked Blu's song so much that it ended up on The Princess Diaries 2 soundtrack and earned Blu a RIAA Certified Gold Record, with over 700,000 units sold.

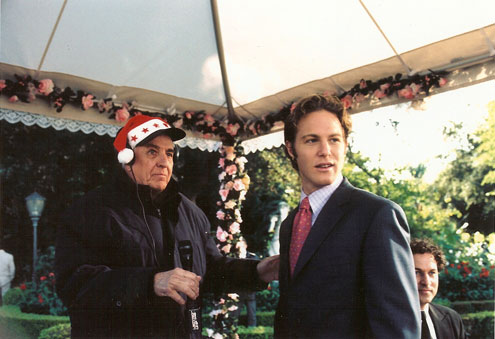
Jonny Blu and Director Garry Marshall on the set of Princess Diaries 2

=== Jazz ===
In 2005, Blu began work on an album in Los Angeles, recording swing and jazz songs that he had written, along with some classic standards that were favorites of his. Influenced by Harry Connick Jr. in his early life (and Elvis Presley, Dean Martin and Brian Setzer), Blu recorded his In Just That Kind of a Mood. After finding licensing for some of his songs, including "In Just That Kind of a Mood" and "Ooh-Wee" which were heard on The Young and the Restless in 2007 and 2008, he moved back to the United States. His album was released in Eastern Europe by Universal Music Group (2008). He released the EP In a Groove (2008).

Blu has performed at the Catalina Jazz Club in Hollywood, Vibrato Jazz Club in Bel Air, California; Iridium Jazz Club in New York, Anthology and Tango Del Rey in San Diego, The Skokie Theater in Chicago, and SoHo Music Club in Santa Barbara, California. His album Taboo! was released in October 2009. His first promotional shows were in New York on September 12, 2009, at Iridium Jazz Club in New York City and on December 15, 2009, at Herb Alpert's Vibrato Jazz Club in Los Angeles.

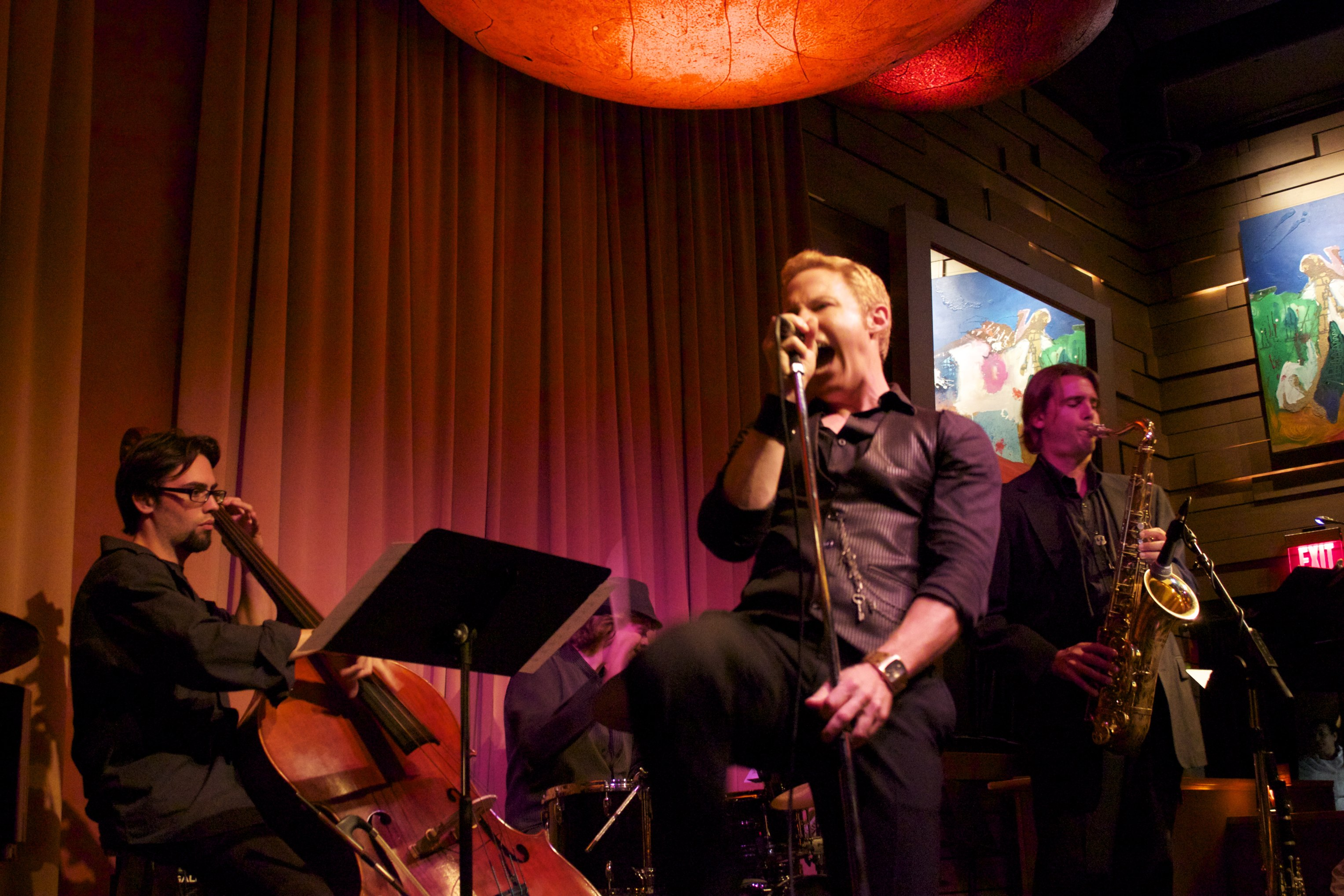
Jonny Blu at Vibrato Jazz Club - 2010

Jonny Blu live at Iridium Jazz Club - 2010

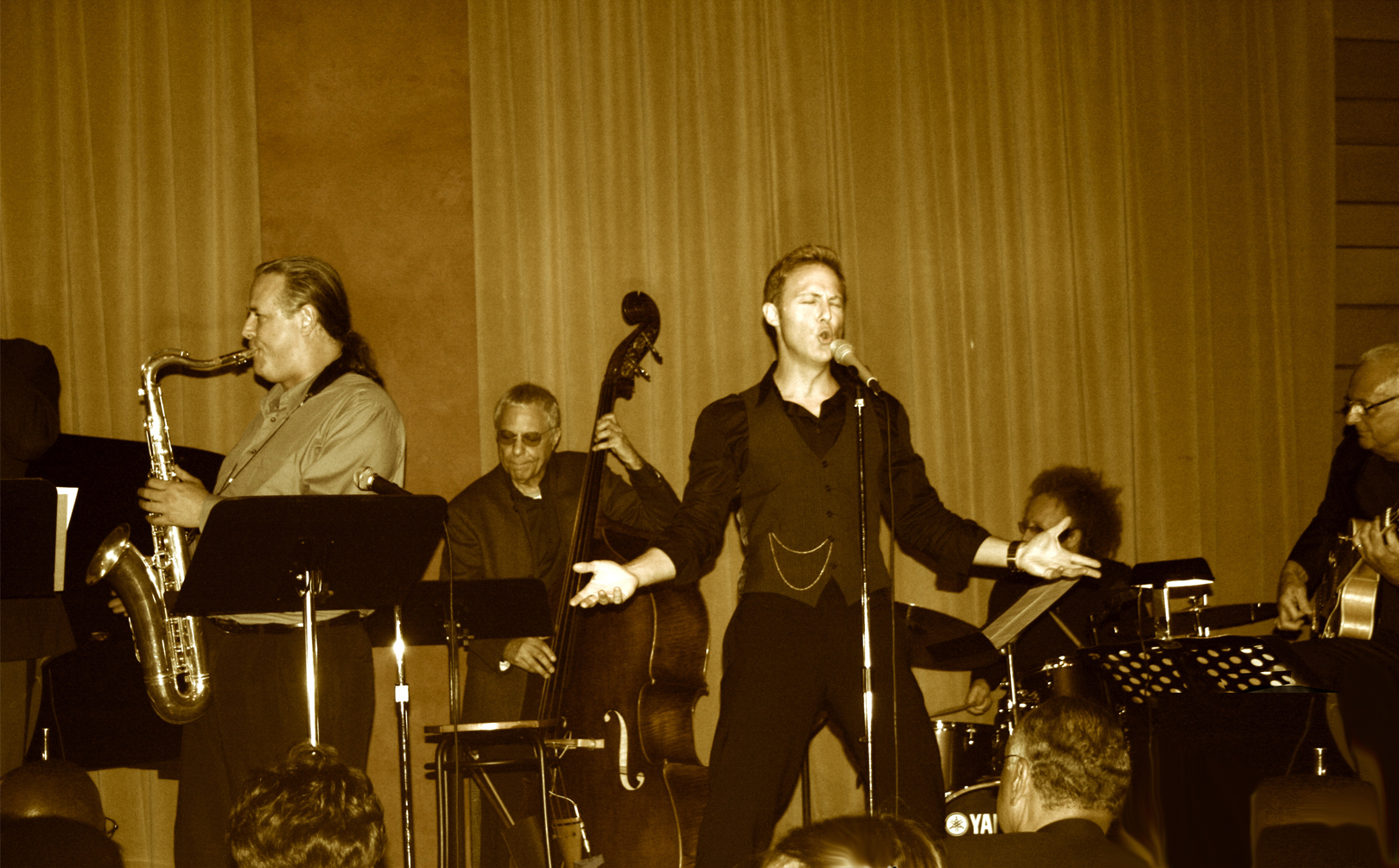
Jonny Blu at Vibrato Jazz Club - 2009

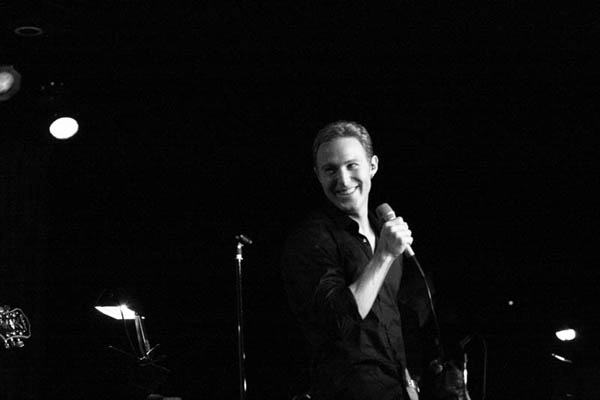
Jonny Blu at Catalina Jazz Club - 2007

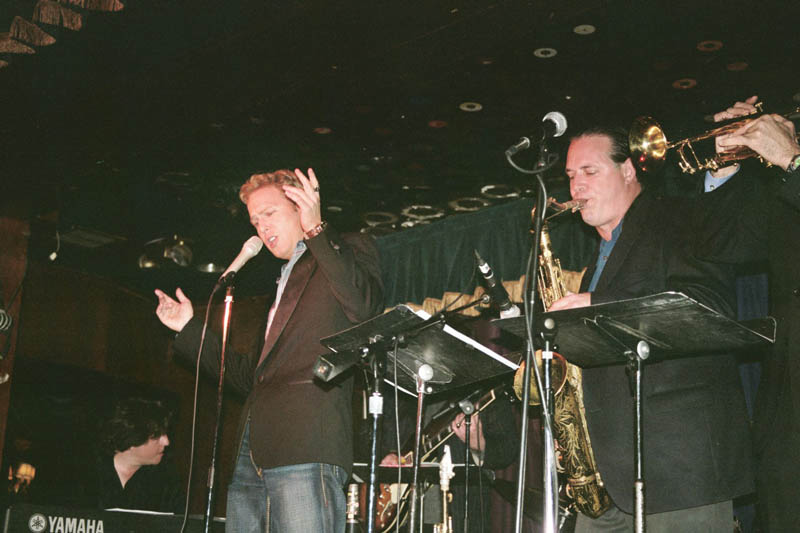
Jonny Blu performs at The Mint - 2007

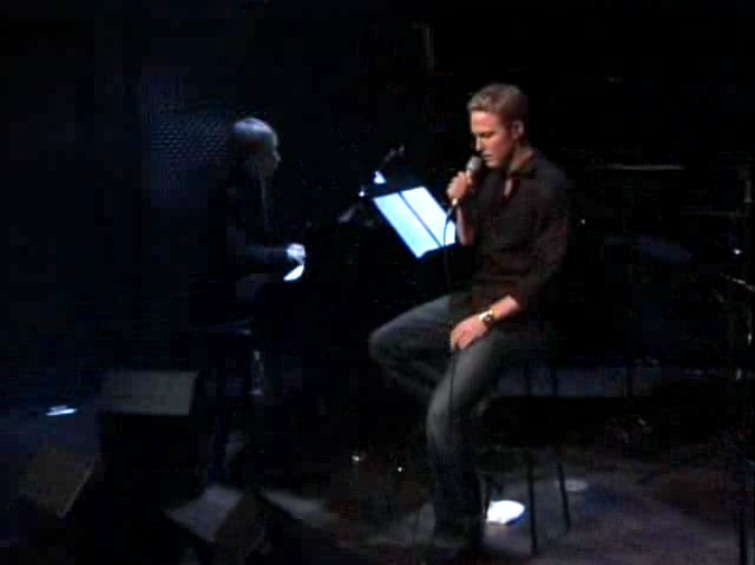
Jonny Blu performs at Anthology - 2007

== Discography ==
=== Albums ===
Year	Title	Genre	Label
2012	The Ukulele Experience, Vol. One	Folk/pop	Dao Feng
2010	"Holiday for Two" (single)	Swing/Christmas/pop	Dao Feng/Born Too Late
2009	Taboo!	Swing/smooth jazz/Latin jazz	Peer/Dao Feng
2008	In a Groove	Swing/smooth jazz/pop	Dao Feng/Jonny Blu
2007	In Just That Kind of a Mood	Smooth jazz/pop	Dao Feng/Jonny Blu
2005	On the Edge-刀鋒	Chinese pop/world/pop	Dao Feng Music/See Music

== Filmography ==
Year	Film	Role	Director	Studio
2004	Princess Diaries 2	Miracles Singer/Jonny Blu	Garry Marshall	Disney

== Awards ==
Year	Venue	Award	Category	Result
2005	Metro Music Awards – China /)		Pop	Won

=== Charts ===
Chart (2004)	Peak position	Certification	Album/CD	Song title
U.S. Billboard 200	15	Gold	The Princess Diaries 2: Royal Engagement (Soundtrack)	Miracles Happen
U.S. Top Soundtracks	1	Gold	The Princess Diaries 2: Royal Engagement (Soundtrack)	Miracles Happen
