= Todd Thibaud =

American singer-songwriter

- Origin: Burlington, Vermont, US
- Genres: Modern rock Power pop
- Labels: Doolittle Records; 95 North; Wicked Disc; Blue Rose Records
- Website: toddthibaud.com

Todd Thibaud is a singer-songwriter based in Boston, Massachusetts, USA. He was a co-founder of the group Courage Brothers, a power pop group of the early 1990s, before establishing himself as a solo musician in the late 1990s and 2000s.

== Biography ==
Thibaud was raised in Burlington, Vermont, and moved to Boston in 1987 to pursue a career in music. The Courage Brothers, whom Thibaud fronted, released two albums independently in 1993 and 1994, and the group was nearing a deal with a major label Relativity Records when the group broke up. Thibaud retained the band name and continued work on the major-label release, but was eventually dropped when Relativity switched formats from rock to hip hop and R&B. Thibaud then embarked on a solo career, garnering critical acclaim for his first release, 1997's Favorite Waste of Time. The album was produced by Dumptruck founder Kevin Salem. Songs from Favorite Waste of Time were used on the television series Melrose Place, 7th Heaven and Smallville, and Thibaud appeared on HBO's show, Reverb. The album Little Mystery followed in 1999, as did Squash in 2002; both met with critical success. Thibaud then was involved in Hardpan, a collaboration between Singer-Songwriters in 2002, including Thibaud, Chris Borrouhgs, Terry Lee Hale and Joseph Parsons. Thibaud also wrote the theme song to the 2000 Big East basketball championship for ESPN, a song entitled "In the City Tonight". Thibaud did two Records until now with Joseph Parsons (Blue Rose Records 2007 and 2011). Thibaud has toured the US numerous times but now performs mostly in the Boston area, continuing to release music independently; many of the albums he released in the 2000s have been on Blue Rose Records, a German imprint. His 2009 release Broken was released in single-CD and double-CD formats, the latter containing a full-length acoustic bonus disc.

== Discography ==
With the Courage Brothers

- Something Strong (Eastern Front Records, 1993)
- Wood (Eastern Front, 1994)

As a solo artist

- Favorite Waste of Time (Doolittle Records, 1997)
- Little Mystery (Doolittle, 1999)
- Dead Flowers (Blue Rose Rec. 2000)
- Church Street Live (Blue Rose Records, 2001)
- Hot FM Sessions (Blue Rose, 2001)
- Squash (Tone Cool, 2002)
- Northern Skies (95 North, 2005)
- Best of Todd Thibaud (Blue Rose, 2006)
- Live (Blue Rose, 2006)
- Broken (Blue Rose, 2009)
- Lakewest Sessions (Blue Rose Rec. 2009)
- Live at the Rockpalast – Crossroads Festival (BlueRose Rec. DCD + DVD 2011)
- Waterfall (Blue Rose Rec. 2013)
- Hill West (Blue Rose Rec. 2019)

With Joseph Parsons

- Joseph Parsons & Todd Thibaud (Blue Rose Rec. 2007)
- Transcontinental Voices (Blue Rose Rec. 2011)

With Sean Staples

- Music Star, Live in April (Blue Rose Rec. 2012)

With Hardpan

- Hardpan (Blue Rose Rec. 2002)
