= In a Groove =

EP by Jonny Blu
- Released: 21 July 2008 (US)
- Recorded: 2005–2006
- Studio: Sound Cubed (Hollywood, USA)
- Genre: Pop, Swing, jazz, Standardsvocal pop, big band
- Length: 68:20
- Label: Dao Feng Music/Jonny Blu Music
- Producer: Myke Aaron, Jonny Blu

Jonny Blu chronology
In Just That Kind of a Mood (2008)	In a Groove (2008)	Taboo! (2009)

In a Groove is the second studio album (in the US) by singer/songwriter Jonny Blu, released in the United States on 21 July 2008 by Dao Feng Music and Sound Cubed Studios. It is an EP of original compositions by Jonny Blu.

== Track listing ==
1. "Always Something There" – 3:45
2. "In a Groove" – 3:45
3. "Sweet Lovin' in the Afternoon" – 3:45
4. "Smilin' Eyes (Ain't Always Nice)" – 2:53
5. "Ooh-Wee" – 3:45

== Personnel ==
=== Musicians ===
- Jonny Blu – vocals, music arrangements
- Myke Aaron – piano, music arrangements
- Bob Malone – piano
- John Chiodini – guitar
- Chris Conner – bass guitar
- Lee Thornberg – trumpet
- – trombone
- Doug Webb – saxophone, woodwind, clarinet, flute
- John Stuart – drums, percussion
- Bob Malone – violin

=== Production ===
- Myke Aaron – producer, engineer, mixing
- Jonny Blu – producer, arranger
- Myke Aaron – mixing, mastering
