= In the Groove (Planet Drum album) =

Studio album by Planet Drum
- Released: August 5, 2022
- Studio: Studio X, Sebastopol, California
- Genre: World music
- Length: 37:05
- Label: Valley Entertainment
- Producer: Mickey Hart, Zakir Hussain

Mickey Hart chronology
RAMU (2017)	In the Groove (2022)

In the Groove is an album by Planet Drum, a percussion-based world music ensemble led by Mickey Hart, Zakir Hussain, Sikiru Adepoju, and Giovanni Hidalgo. It was released on August 5, 2022.

According to music journalist Michael Broerman, "With Hart from the United States, Hussain from India, Hidalgo from Puerto Rico, and Adepoju from Nigeria, they represent a consortium of the top percussionists from around the globe, united by a common language of rhythm."

In the Groove is the fifth album by Planet Drum, following At the Edge (1990), Planet Drum (1991), Supralingua (1998), and Global Drum Project (2007).

== Critical reception ==
In Americana Highways David Nowels wrote, "The album continues Planet Drum's hypnotic trance-like exploration of music at its most primal. The Planet Drum ensemble have created an atmospheric sonic experience that is both uniquely organic and electronic."

Bill Meredith of JazzTimes noted that Hart wanted the album "to live up to its name by being more danceable," and remarked: "Mission accomplished... what a percussive web they all weave." He singled out Hidalgo's playing for praise, commenting: "When the great conguero's battle with diabetes threatened his career through finger amputations, he crafted the new stick-and-hand technique that makes the closing 'Gadago Gadago' dance."

Riff Magazine's Tony Hicks stated that "the playing and arranging" on the album are "both first-rate," and suggested that it will appeal to listeners who are "into the premise of regional, ethnic drumming, getting to the intricacies of the rhythms, where they come from, how each percussive sidebar takes certain paths and how they all come together again."

== Track listing ==
1. "King Clave"
2. "Storm Drum"
3. "Tides"
4. "Drops"
5. "Phil Da Glass"
6. "Gadago Gadago"

== Personnel ==
Planet Drum

- Mickey Hart – beats, bass beams (monochord), RAMU (Random Access Musical Universe), the beast (large cylinder drums), piccolo drums, V-Drums, MalletKAT, gamelan, glass bowls, thumb piano, conch, metal
- Zakir Hussain – tabla, shakers, madal, dholak, balafon, vocals
- Sikiru Adepoju – apala (talking drum)
- Giovanni Hidalgo – congas, bahia, timbales, vocals

Additional musicians

- Isaac Eady – drum set
- Mañengue Hidalgo – congas
- Melissa Hie – vocals, balafon, doum, djembe, metal, shekere, claps
- Ophelia Hie – vocals, balafon, metal, shekere, claps
- Edgardo "Kako" Maldanado – guiro
- Baba Olatunje – vocals
- Noel Rosado – bells
- Jatinder Singh – Rajasthani folk vocals
- India sessions – bass drum, duff, bottles and hi percussion, buckets, Pune dhol, vocal shouts, tabla, tasha, trash percussion, dimdi, ghumka, halgi, sambhal, sleigh bell, zanj, chondka, Nashik dhol, chenda, dholak, metal percussion, big ghungru, chimpta, dhol, matka, padhant, UduPune dhol, udu

Production

- Produced by Mickey Hart, Zakir Hussain
- Associate producer: Reya Hart
- Mixing: Mickey Hart, Tom Lattanand, Zakir Hussain
- Arrangements: Zakir Hussain, Mickey Hart, Tom Lattanand, Adam Tenenbaum
- Recording engineers: Tom Lattanand, Moldover, Adam Tenenbaum, Michal Menert, Cherron Arens, Jerome Forney, Jonathan Koh, Bill Wolter, Jason Reed
- Mastering: Michael Romanowski
- Album art: Tim Bremner
