= Dumptruck (band) =

American rock band

- Origin: Boston, Massachusetts, U.S.
- Genres: Indie rock, garage rock
- Years active: 1983–1991, 1994–present
- Labels: Big Time Records, Rykodisc
- Members: Seth Tiven; Alan Durham; Andrew Duplantis; Mark Patterson
- Past members: Kirk Swan; Steve Michener; Shawn Devlin; Kevin Salem; Tom Shad; George Duron; Tim McMaster; Tommy Roalson; Spike Priggen; Brian Dunton

Dumptruck is an American band formed in Boston, Massachusetts, in 1983 by composers, guitarists, and singers Seth Tiven and Kirk Swan.

== History ==
The principal songwriter and sole continuous member of Dumptruck is Seth Tiven. Born and raised in Connecticut, Tiven received his Bachelor of Arts in music in 1980 from Wesleyan University in Middletown. In 1981 he moved to Boston, where he performed in several local bands with Swan and drummer Mark Mulcahy.

In 1983, Swan and Tiven formed Dumptruck and began writing songs. The duo recorded six songs with Mulcahy at a local studio. "[They were] demos, really, more than anything else," Swan recalled on the liner notes to the 2004 reissue. "Seth and I played bass on each other's songs... which is how we would tackle the songs live in this incarnation of the band." Pleased with the results, the duo recorded six additional songs with drummer James Clement and released D is for Dumptruck on Incas records in 1983.

The record was well-received "The dozen songs fall somewhere between Joy Division and the dB's", said The New Trouser Press Record Guide. Robert Christgau awarded the record an "A−" in his Village Voice review. The duo added Shawn Devlin on drums and Steve Michener on bass for live performances and signed with Big Time Records.

Their second album, Positively Dumptruck was recorded at Mitch Easter's Drive In studio in Winston-Salem, North Carolina with Don Dixon producing. The record was played heavily on college radio and Dumptruck won the Best Independent Album Award at the Boston Music Awards.

"By the end of 1986, a year and a half of pretty constant touring had taken its toll on the band," Tiven remembered. "Steve Michener had quit the band shortly after Positively had been released ... When we returned home from a particularly grueling 3-month tour just before Christmas, Kirk [replacement bassist Michael 'Spike' Priggen] made a decision to leave the band."

When Tiven and Devlin were uncertain about continuing the band, the label urged them to move forward, offering them a chance to record their next album in Rockfield Studios in Wales with producer Hugh Jones. Tiven and Devlin recruited Kevin Salem (guitar, backing vocals) and Tom Shad (bass) and began rehearsing Tiven's new songs.

== Lawsuit ==
For the Country was released in September, 1987, to highly positive reviews. In a retrospective review, the All-Music Guide gave the album four and one-half stars, saying "these are [Tiven's] strongest and most well-crafted songs yet... without coming across as slick or overprocessed... Highly recommended."

During the tour to support the album, the band discovered that Big Time Records was in financial difficulties, when checks issued by the label bounced. During a meeting with label owner Fred Bestall, the band learned that the label had failed to renew the band's contract prior to its expiration date.

In early 1988, the band learned that Big Time was negotiating to sell Dumptruck's contract to Phonogram Records. The band's lawyer sent Phonogram a copy of the expired contract with a letter instructing the label to negotiate directly with them.

When Big Time discovered that the band was attempting to negotiate directly with Phonogram, the label sued Dumptruck for breach of contract, requesting $5 million in damages, and threatening the other label with a $10 million lawsuit for tortious interference. Phonogram (and subsequently, other labels) declined to sign a contract with the band until the suit was resolved, leaving the band with no way to release new material.

After almost three years (and $40,000 in legal fees) Dumptruck received a default judgment against Big Time Records when the label's attorneys failed to appear in court for a hearing. The band (which had filed a countersuit) was awarded $240,000 (very little of which it received from the now-bankrupt label) and the rights to its Big Time recordings.

After one of the creditors of Big Time Records filed a lien for rights to Dumptruck's master recordings, the band broke up in 1991, and Tiven moved to Austin Texas.

== Later recordings ==
After relocating, Tiven worked as a computer programmer. Songs recorded by the band between 1988-91 were eventually released as Days of Fear in 1994, on Unclean Records. At this time, Tiven was approached by guitarist Alan Durham about reforming Dumptruck with Austin musicians. Tiven was open to the idea and soon they were joined by drummer George Duron and a cast of bass players. Tiven and Durham still make up the core of Dumptruck, playing in Austin TX and occasionally doing shows in the Northeast with original members. Since relocating to Austin, Dumptruck has issued records: Terminal (1998) and Lemmings Travel to the Sea (2001), both on Devil In The Woods Records, and most recent "Wrecked" (2018)Schoolkids Records

Salem has released six solo recordings and worked as a guitarist, vocalist, producer or engineer with artists including Emmylou Harris, Yo La Tengo, Mercury Rev and Mooney Suzuki.

In 1999, Swan released a solo album, entitled It's About Time. In 2009, he released a second album, It's Only Me.

In 2003, Rykodisc reissued the band's first three albums with additional tracks. In 2006, the label released a compilation CD, "Haul of Fame."

In 2007, Tiven released a solo recording, entitled "Solitude". Dumptruck continues to perform occasional shows in the Austin area.

== Discography ==
- D Is For Dumptruck (1983)
- Positively Dumptruck (1986)
- For the Country (1987)
- Days Of Fear (1994)
- Terminal (1998)
- Lemmings Travel To The Sea (2001)
- Haul of Fame (2006)
- Wrecked (2018)
