= In Just That Kind of a Mood =

Studio album by Jonny Blu
- Released: 6 November 2006 (U.S.)
- Recorded: 2005–2006; Sound Cubed Studios (Hollywood, USA)
- Genre: Pop, Swing, jazz, Standards, vocal pop, big band
- Length: 34:27
- Label: Dao Feng Music/Jonny Blu Music/Sound Cubed Music
- Producer: Myke Aaron, Jonny Blu

Jonny Blu chronology
On the Edge (刀鋒) (2005)	In Just That Kind of a Mood (2006)

In Just That Kind of a Mood was the first studio album (in the U.S) by singer/songwriter Jonny Blu, released in the United States on November 6, 2006 by Dao Feng Music and Sound Cubed Studios. It is a mix of original Swing, Big Band and Vocal Jazz/Pop compositions by Jonny Blu and some classic American songbook standards.

== Track listing ==
1. "Smilin' Eyes (Ain't Always Nice)" – 2:53
2. "The Girl from Ipanema" – 2:52
3. "How Can I" – 3:35
4. "I Need Love" – 3:58
5. "Ooh-Wee" – 3:45
6. "In Just That Kind of a Mood" – 3:56
7. "King of the Road" – 3:03
8. "Always, Forever You and Me" – 2:40
9. "Are You Lonesome Tonight?" – 2:15
10. "I Get No Kick from Champagne" – 3:07
11. "Your Birthday Song (Aka The Birthday Song)" – 2:04

== Personnel ==
=== Musicians ===
- Jonny Blu – vocals, music arrangements
- Myke Aaron – piano, music arrangements
- Bob Malone – piano
- Mark Miller – guitar
- Ricky Zahariades – guitar
- Chris Golden – bass
- Chris Tedesco – trumpet
- Martin Blasick– trombone
- Doug Webb – saxophone, woodwind, clarinet, flute
- Jimmy Paxson – drums, percussion

=== Production ===
- Myke Aaron – producer, engineer, mixing
- Jonny Blu – producer, arranger
- Myke Aaron – mixing, mastering

== International album variations ==
Jonny Blu-In Just That Kind Of A Mood-South Korea-Musicmine Records/Loen Ent.-March 2010

Jonny Blu-In Just That Kind Of A Mood-Eastern Europe-QL Music/Universal Music Group-2009
