= Taboo! =

Studio album by Jonny Blu
- Released: 6 October 2009 (U.S.)
- Recorded: 2007–2009; Peer Music Studios (Hollywood, USA)
- Genre: Pop, Swing, jazz, Standards Latin Jazz,
- Length: 68:20
- Label: Peer Music
- Producer: Bob Malone, Todd Herfindal, Louis White, Brady Benton, Jonny Blu

Jonny Blu chronology
In A Groove (EP) (2008)	Taboo! (2009)

Taboo! is the 3rd studio album (in the U.S) by singer/songwriter Jonny Blu, released in the United States on 6 October 2009 by Peer Music and Dao Feng Music. It is a compilation of classic Latin Standards from the Peer Music catalog.

== Track listing ==
1. "Taboo" ("Tabú") – 3:12
2. "Be True to Me" ("Sabor A Mí") – 3:02
3. "Frenesí" – 2:25
4. "Perhaps Perhaps Perhaps" ("Quizas quizas quizas") – 2:42
5. "Say No More" ("Mais que Nada") – 4:20
6. "Adiós" – 3:54
7. "Bésame Mucho" – 3:14
8. "Time Was" ("Duerme") – 2:24
9. "Babaloo" ("Babalú") – 2:31
10. "Amor" – 3:48
11. "Sabor A Mí" (en Español) – 3:02
12. "Bésame Mucho (en Español)" – 3:14
13. "Perhaps Perhaps Perhaps" (Duet with Juanita Rosa) – 2:43
  - Also contains full instrumentals for the first ten songs

== Personnel ==
=== Musicians ===
- Jonny Blu – vocals
- Bob Malone – piano, music arrangements
- John Chiodini – guitar, 12 string guitar
- Chris Conner – bass
- Lee Thornburg – trumpet
- Nick Lanel – trombone
- Doug Webb – saxophone, woodwind, clarinet, flute
- Jimmy Paxson – drums, percussion
- John Acosta – cello
- Candy Girard – violin
- Sai-Ly – violin
- Alex Shlifer – violin
- Tom Tally – violin
- Todd Herfindal – percussion
- Brady L. Benton – percussion
- Bob Malone – orchestra leader

=== Production ===
- Todd Herfindal – producer, engineer, mixing
- Louis White – producer, engineer, mixing
- Bob Malone – arranger, producer
- Brady L. Benton – producer
- Jonny Blu – producer
- Stephen Marsh – mixing, mastering
- Yvonne Gomez – executive producer for Peer-Southern Productions, Inc./Peer Music
- Kathy Spanberger – executive producer for Peer-Southern Productions, Inc/Peer Music
- Paul Gonzales – artwork, album package design
- Rebecca Sapp – front cover photography
- Gisela Prishker – inside and back cover photography
