= Collegium Musicum (disambiguation) =

Collegium Musicum was one of several types of musical societies in German and German-Swiss cities and towns.

Collegium Musicum may also refer to:

- Collegium Musicum (band), a Slovak art rock band
- Collegium Musicum de Caracas, a Venezuelan musical group (1964-1976)
- Collegium Musicum 90, an English baroque orchestra
- Collegium Musicum Den Haag, a baroque orchestra
- Collegium Musicum de Paris, a chamber orchestra founded by Roland Douatte
- Harvard–Radcliffe Collegium Musicum, a mixed chorus at Harvard University
