= Nonesuch Records =

American record label (founded 1964)

- Parent company: Warner Music Group
- Founded: 1964
- Founder: Jac Holzman
- Distributors: Warner Records (In the US); Warner Music Group (Outside of the US)
- Genre: Various
- Country of origin: US
- Location: New York City
- Official website: nonesuch.com

Nonesuch Records is an American record company and label owned by Warner Music Group, distributed by Warner Records (formerly Warner Bros. Records), and based in New York City. Founded by Jac Holzman in 1964 as a budget classical label, Nonesuch has developed into a label that records a wide range of music genres. Robert Hurwitz was president of the company from 1984 to 2017.

== History ==
=== Founding ===
Nonesuch was founded in early 1964 by Jac Holzman to produce "fine records at the same price as a trade paperback", which would be half the price of a normal LP. To achieve this, he licensed European recordings of classical music as it would be too expensive to record new material. Originally the label concentrated heavily on chamber and baroque music, often with (then) unique repertory, and typically sold at less-than-premium prices. Upon its formation, Nonesuch operated as a subsidiary label of Elektra Records, which Holzman had launched in 1950. In 1970, Holzman sold Elektra and Nonesuch to Kinney National Company, which became Warner Communications and later part of Time Warner's Warner Music Group. In 2004, Warner Music Group became an independently owned, publicly traded company.

The 1968 catalogue already listed over 200 albums. During the first years, the focus was clearly set on early music, i.e. music that was composed before 1800. Some artists appeared frequently:

- Karl Ristenpart with his Chamber Orchestra of the Saar with different works by Johann Sebastian Bach and other baroque composers.
- Leslie Jones with The Little Orchestra of London recorded many symphonies by Joseph Haydn, as well as other works from the same period.
- The French violinist and conductor Roland Douatte, together with his Collegium Musicum de Paris, recorded several works by Johann Sebastian Bach, Georg Philipp Telemann, and Antonio Vivaldi.
- The Danish organist Jørgen Ernst Hansen recorded works by Dietrich Buxtehude and Johann Pachelbel, and started the series "Master Works for Organ" which included works by baroque masters, played at different organs in Europe. The series subsequently counted eleven volumes (not all played by Hansen though).

There was some later music as well. Günter Wand conducted Ludwig van Beethoven's Missa solemnis, Carl Schuricht conducted Anton Bruckners 7th Symphony, and Pierre Boulez with Orchestre National de la R.T.F played The Rite of Spring.

=== 1965–1979: Teresa Sterne ===
Teresa Sterne led Nonesuch Records from 1965 until 1979; she was responsible not only for all of the artists & repertory decisions but also for overseeing the increasingly distinctive look of the record jackets. Sterne oversaw several firsts for the label, including early electronic releases. Nonesuch commissioned Morton Subotnick's 1967 album Silver Apples of the Moon (made on the Buchla 100), and in 1966 released a 2-LP set of Moog sounds with 16-page booklet called The Nonesuch Guide to Electronic Music by Beaver & Krause (which spent 26 weeks in Billboard's Top 100 chart).

Among the most notable achievements of Sterne's time at the label were the release of George Crumb's Ancient Voices of Children, inspired by the poems of Federico García Lorca, which sold more than 70,000 units; the recording of new works by Elliott Carter, including his first and second string quartets; and the commissioning and release of Charles Wuorinen's Time's Encomium, which became the first electronic work to win the Pulitzer Prize for Music in 1970. Under Sterne, Nonesuch helped spark a ragtime revival in the United States with the release of a series of Scott Joplin piano rags performed by Joshua Rifkin. Sterne also launched the groundbreaking Explorer Series, building the foundation for the field of world music.

Sterne's abrupt termination in December 1979 prompted some two dozen Nonesuch artists to write a letter to the editor of the New York Times speaking out against the decision; several noteworthy composers, Elliott Carter and Aaron Copland among them, sent a letter to the vice president of the parent company, Warner Communications, in protest.

Sterne was replaced by the founder's younger brother, Keith Holzman, a production chief who, for the next five years, operated the label from Los Angeles.

=== 1984–2016: Robert Hurwitz ===
Former Blue Thumb Records founder Bob Krasnow, who assumed the chairmanship of Elektra Records in 1983, brought in the 34-year-old Bob Hurwitz in 1984, at the time the head of the US division of the Warner Bros. Records-distributed jazz label ECM Records, to run Nonesuch Records.

Within the first two years under Hurwitz's leadership, Nonesuch released albums by such "new music" pioneers as Steve Reich (The Desert Music, 1985), John Adams (Harmonielehre, 1986), Philip Glass (Mishima, 1985), John Zorn (The Big Gundown, 1985), and Kronos Quartet (Kronos Quartet, 1986). (Kronos Quartet's 1992 album Pieces of Africa topped both the Billboard classical and world music charts.) Hurwitz established a jazz roster at the label, which included Zorn, Wayne Horvitz, and the World Saxophone Quartet. He built upon the world music reputation of Nonesuch, represented up to that point by the Explorer Series, with his signing of Brazilian singer and composer Caetano Veloso, who, like Reich and Adams, has maintained an ongoing relationship with the label for decades. Among Nonesuch world-music successes during the 1980s was the release of Le Mystère des Voix Bulgares, a recording of the Bulgarian State Television female choir, and the American debut of the Gipsy Kings, which was certified platinum with over one million in sales. Nonesuch enjoyed even greater success on the world music front in the late 1990s with the release of Buena Vista Social Club, which became the biggest-selling disc in the label's history and spawned many successful solo recordings from the stars of those original Ry Cooder-led sessions in Havana, Cuba.

In 1994, Hurwitz hired David Bither, the Senior Vice President and General Manager of Elektra Records, to head the international department at Nonesuch Records. But Bither quickly showed a far greater interest and talent in A&R (artists & repertoire) and, soon after coming to the label, made a number of important signings that expanded the company's musical landscape while holding to the same ideals that had been long established from the company's earliest days. Bither's first signing, Emmylou Harris, signaled a new direction for the label. Harris, previously signed to Warner Bros. Records and Elektra Records, whose 2000 album Red Dirt Girl garnered a Grammy Award for Best Contemporary Folk Album. Though she had long been a highly regarded interpreter of other writers' songs, her Nonesuch debut was distinguished by being her first album to primarily feature self-penned compositions. In the decade that followed, k.d. lang, Randy Newman, Shawn Colvin, and Ry Cooder joined the label as did the rock band Wilco, which released four studio albums on the label, starting with its breakthrough disc Yankee Hotel Foxtrot, which was released on Nonesuch after it was rejected by Reprise Records. Laurie Anderson has put out three discs with the label, and Nonesuch reissued her seminal Big Science album, an avant-garde project that became an unlikely pop hit in 1982. David Byrne released a solo album, Grown Backwards, on the label, as well as a live concert album with Caetano Veloso, Live at Carnegie Hall, and the original recording of his collaboration with Fatboy Slim, Here Lies Love. That recounting of the life and loves of former Filipino leader Imelda Marcos, was turned into an Off-Broadway musical at The Public Theater in the spring of 2013.

Among more recent Nonesuch signings, the most commercially successful has been The Black Keys, the former Akron, Ohio-based duo who parlayed cult status as no-frills blues rockers into an arena-sized following and received multiple Grammy Awards for their 2010 album Brothers and their 2012 release El Camino.

Forward-thinking traditional groups Carolina Chocolate Drops and Punch Brothers also joined the label, as well as iconoclastic folk interpreter Sam Amidon. The Chocolate Drops, a group exploring the African-American roots of old-time music, won a Grammy Award for Best Traditional Folk Album for its Nonesuch debut, Genuine Negro Jig. Mandolinist and composer Chris Thile of Punch Brothers was named a 2012 MacArthur Fellow, receiving one of 23 "genius" grant awards to extraordinary practitioners in a variety of creative fields. As a solo artist, he has also joined the classical ranks of the label, releasing the first of three discs of Bach's Sonatas and Partitas, written for the violin but transposed by Thile for mandolin.

Nonesuch has been building a catalog of Broadway cast recordings, including several works by multiple Tony and Grammy Award-winning composer/lyricist Stephen Sondheim. The label has released the cast recordings of several Broadway revivals of Sondheim's musicals. Among them are the 1998 production of Gypsy (music by Jule Styne, lyrics by Sondheim); 2002's Into the Woods; 2010's A Little Night Music; and Irish director John Doyle's reimaginings of Sweeney Todd (2006) and Company (2007). The label also released the soundtrack to Tim Burton's film adaptation of Sweeney Todd, starring Johnny Depp, in 2007. Nonesuch has also released recordings of less well-known Sondheim works like Saturday Night (his first) and The Frogs, as well as first recordings of his new musical Bounce and its later incarnation, Road Show.

From the next generation of composers, Adam Guettel has made three recordings for Nonesuch: the cast recording of his first musical, Floyd Collins (1996), the Original Cast Recording of his Tony Award-winning The Light in the Piazza; and his song cycle Myths and Hymns (earlier mounted off Broadway under the title Saturn Returns).

Among the champions of Adam Guettel's work is five-time Tony Award-winning singer and actress Audra McDonald, who has showcased his compositions, among the works of a number of other contemporary composers, on her 1998 Nonesuch solo debut album, Way Back to Paradise, and later recordings How Glory Goes (2000), Build a Bridge (2006), and Go Back Home (2013). Her 2002 album Happy Songs featured music of the 1930s and '40s by songwriters like Harold Arlen, Irving Berlin, and the Gershwins.

As with its catalog of Broadway cast recordings, Nonesuch has assembled an equally selective roster of movie soundtracks, chief among them the scores of Philip Glass. His first Nonesuch recording, the soundtrack to Paul Schrader's Mishima: A Life in Four Chapters in 1984, began a decades-long relationship with the label that would include several stand-out soundtracks, like those of Godfrey Reggio's wordless films Powaqqatsi and Koyaanisqatsi, the Errol Morris documentary The Thin Blue Line, Martin Scorsese's 1997 film Kundun, and The Hours, based on the book by Michael Cunningham. Mishima was also the first Nonesuch album from now longtime Nonesuch artists Kronos Quartet. Kronos went on to collaborate with British composer Clint Mansell on his scores for the Darren Aronofsky films Requiem for a Dream (2000), The Fountain (2006), and Noah (2014); the Requiem soundtrack included the piece "Lux Aeterna," which subsequently became a popular track for use in movie trailers and commercials. Nonesuch has also recorded the film work of Radiohead guitarist Jonny Greenwood, including writer-director Paul Thomas Anderson's Oscar-nominated There Will Be Blood (2007) and The Master (2012). Among other Nonesuch movie soundtrack offerings are Jon Brion's score for Anderson's 2002 film Punch-Drunk Love, Stephin Merritt's songs for Pieces of April (2003), Thomas Newman's score for the HBO mini-series Angels in America (2007), and Carter Burwell's score for the Coen brothers' True Grit (2010). The relationship with the Coens has continued with the 2013 release of the soundtrack to Inside Llewyn Davis, produced by T Bone Burnett and the Coen brothers.

In the late 1990s, after Elektra underwent restructuring at the executive level, Nonesuch was shifted under the umbrella of Warner Music International. In the early 2000s, Nonesuch briefly operated under Atlantic Records, and has operated under Warner Bros. Records since in 2004.

In September 2015, it was announced that Bob Hurwitz would step down as president of Nonesuch Records. After serving as co-president of the label with David Bither in 2016, Hurwitz became the chairman emeritus on January 1, 2017, when Bither became sole president.

=== 2017–present: David Bither ===
David Bither, who had served as senior vice president of Nonesuch for 20 years, became co-president of the label with Hurwitz in 2016 and sole president in 2017. Kris Chen, formerly of XL Recordings, was hired as senior vice president in September 2016. In March 2017, it was announced that the band Fleet Foxes would make its Nonesuch debut with the release of Crack-Up, its first album in six years, that June. On March 27, 2026, Red Hot Chili Peppers bassist Flea released his debut solo album Honora.

== Nonesuch Explorer Series ==
In the late 1960s, the Explorer Series made the label a pioneer in the field of world music before the term had even been coined. The series, which Nonesuch released from 1967 to 1984, consisted of field recordings made primarily in Asia, Africa, the Caribbean, Central and South America, and Eastern Europe.

For North American non-travelers, it was the first exposure to musical idioms such as music produced by a gamelan. In 1977, a few of the recordings were chosen for the Voyager Golden Record, and sent into outer space aboard the Voyager spacecraft. In 2008, one of the first Explorer Series albums, Music from the Morning of the World (1967), comprising early field recordings that the British musicologist David Lewiston had made in Bali in 1966, was added to the National Recording Registry by the Library of Congress.

Many of the original analog recordings of the Nonesuch Explorer Series albums were remastered during the 2000s and re-released, with new packaging, in CD format.
