= David Lewiston =

British collector of music

David Sidney George Lewiston (11 May 1929 – 29 May 2017) was a London-born collector of the world's traditional music. He is best known for his recordings initially released on LP on the Explorer Series of Nonesuch Records beginning in 1967.

== Biography ==
He earned a graduate degree in 1953 from Trinity College of Music in London, where he studied piano, conducting, orchestration, harmony, and counterpoint. He later studied composition in New York City with Thomas de Hartmann, who had been a devotee of G. I. Gurdjieff. For more than a decade he served as one of the musicians at the Gurdjieff Foundation, New York. Finding it difficult to make a living as a musician he worked as a journalist for more than a decade but abandoned it to return to music, travelling widely to record traditional music.

His first recordings were made in Bali in 1966, and the initial album from these recordings, Music from the Morning of the World, was released in 1967. He has made extensive recordings of Tibetan Buddhist rituals, most notably of the chordal chanting of Gyuto Tantric University (one of the great colleges of the Gelugpa, the Established Church of Tibetan Buddhism), and the Drukpa Kagyu rituals of Khampagar Gompa, as well as music from many other countries, including Bolivia, Brazil, Colombia, Ecuador, Peru, Guatemala and Mexico, India, Jammu and Kashmir, Ladakh and Lahul, Himachal Pradesh in India's West Himalaya, Gilgit and Hunza in Pakistan's North-West Frontier Province, Darjeeling and Sikkim in the East Himalaya, the Republic of Georgia, and Morocco.

His recordings of the '60s and '70s were made at a significant juncture, when lightweight portable recording equipment had matured sufficiently to allow excellent recordings to be made in remote places, and just before the traditional music of these places suffered the ravages of globalisation.

He lived in Maui, Hawaii, where he was working on archiving his recordings and other materials collected during his life's work. Lewiston died 29 May 2017, aged 88 at a hospice centre in Wailuku, Hawaii.

== Recordings ==
=== Releases ===
- Ladakh – Songs & Dances From The Highlands of Western Tibet (LP) Nonesuch, 1977.
- Tibetan Buddhism – Shartse College of Ganden Monastery (CD) Bridge, 1989
- Kecak: A Balinese Music Drama – Kecak Ganda Sari (CD) Bridge, 1990

=== Production ===
- Japan: Traditional Vocal & Instrumental Music – Shakuhachi, Biwa, Koto, Shamisen (LP) Nonesuch 1976.
- Japan: Kabuki & Other Traditional Music (LP) Nonesuch, 1980.
- Japan: Shakuhachi – The Japanese Flute (CD, Album, RE) Nonesuch, 1991.
- Trance 1: Sufi Dervish Rite / Tibetan Overtone Chant / Indian Dhrupad (CD, Har) Ellipsis Arts, 1995.
- Trance 2: Naqshbandi Sufis / Healing And Trance In Morocco / Balinese Temple Festival (CD, Har) Ellipsis Arts, 1995.

=== Appears On ===
- Music From The Morning Of The World: The Balinese Gamelan (LP) Nonesuch, 1967.
- Golden Rain – Balinese Gamelan Music And Ketjak: The Ramayana Monkey Dance (LP) Nonesuch, 1969.
- The Jasmine Isle: Javanese Gamelan Music (LP) Nonesuch, 1969.
- The Nonesuch Explorer – Music From Distant Corners Of The World – Treasures Of The Explorer Series (2xLP, Comp)
- Tibetan Buddhism – Tantras Of Gyütö: Mahakala (LP) Nonesuch, 1973.
- Ram Narayan, Master of the Sarangi – Classical Music of India (LP) Nonesuch, 1975.
- Tibetan Buddhism – Tantras of Gyütö: Sangwa Düpa (LP) Nonesuch, 1975.
- Japan: Traditional Vocal & Instrumental Music – Shakuhachi, Biwa, Koto, Shamisen (LP) Nonesuch, 1976.
- Tibetan Buddhism – The Ritual Orchestra And Chants (LP) Nonesuch, 1976.
- Japan: Kabuki & Other Traditional Music (LP) Nonesuch, 1980.
- China: Music Of The Pipa (CD, Album, RE) Nonesuch, 1991.
- Trance 1: Sufi Dervish Rite / Tibetan Overtone Chant / Indian Dhrupad (CD) Jigje Kyi Dagjug Chenm. Ellipsis Arts, 1995.
- Trance 2: Naqshbandi Sufis / Healing And Trance In Morocco / Balinese Temple Festival (CD) Ellipsis Arts, 1995.
- Music From The Morning Of The World – The Balinese Gamelan (CD, RE) WEA Japan, Nonesuch, 1996.
- Bali – Music From The Morning Of The World (CD, Album, RE) Nonesuch, 2003.
- South America – Black Music In Praise Of Oxalá And Other Gods (CD, Comp) Nonesuch, 2003.
- Kingdom Of The Sun – Peru's Inca Heritage (LP, Comp) Nonesuch.
