= Music of Tibet (album) =

Studio album by The Gyuto Monks
- Released: 1967 (LP) 2005 (CD)
- Recorded: 1967
- Genre: Ethnic
- Label: GemsTone
- Producer: Huston Smith

Music of Tibet is a historic recording, made by world religion scholar Huston Smith in 1967. While traveling in India, Smith was staying at the Gyuto Monastery. While listening to the monks chanting, he realized that each monk was producing multiple overtones for each note, creating a chord from a single voice. He made a recording of the chanting and had engineers at MIT confirm the phenomenon, which is known as overtone singing.

The recording was originally released as an LP on Anthology Records. In 2005 the master tapes were digitized for a CD on the GemsTone label. Royalties from sales of the CD go to the Gyuto Tantric University in India.

== Track listing ==
- 1 Drumbeat to Summon the Deities
- 2 Guhyasamaja Tantra (Excerpt)
- 3 A Prayer for Refuge
- 4 Invocation of mGon-po
- 5 Invocation of Mahakala
- 6 Prayer of Absolution and Purification
- 7 Selections from Guhyasamaja Tantra (Chapter 5)
- 8 Prayer to mGon-po (Mahakala)
- 9 Prayer to Hla-Mo
- 10 Prayer to Chos-Gyal (Dharmaraja or Yama)
- 11 Prayer for the Preservation of the Buddha Dharma
- 12 Invocation of Mahakala
- 13 Prayer to Mahakala

== Credits ==
- Mickey Hart - Technical Assistance
- Nick Morgan - Technical Assistance
- David Schonbrunn - Technical Assistance
- Romio Shrestha - Images
- Huston Smith - Engineer, Liner Notes
