= Gyuto Order =

Monastic institution of the Gelug order

Coordinates: 29.6586°N 91.1306°E

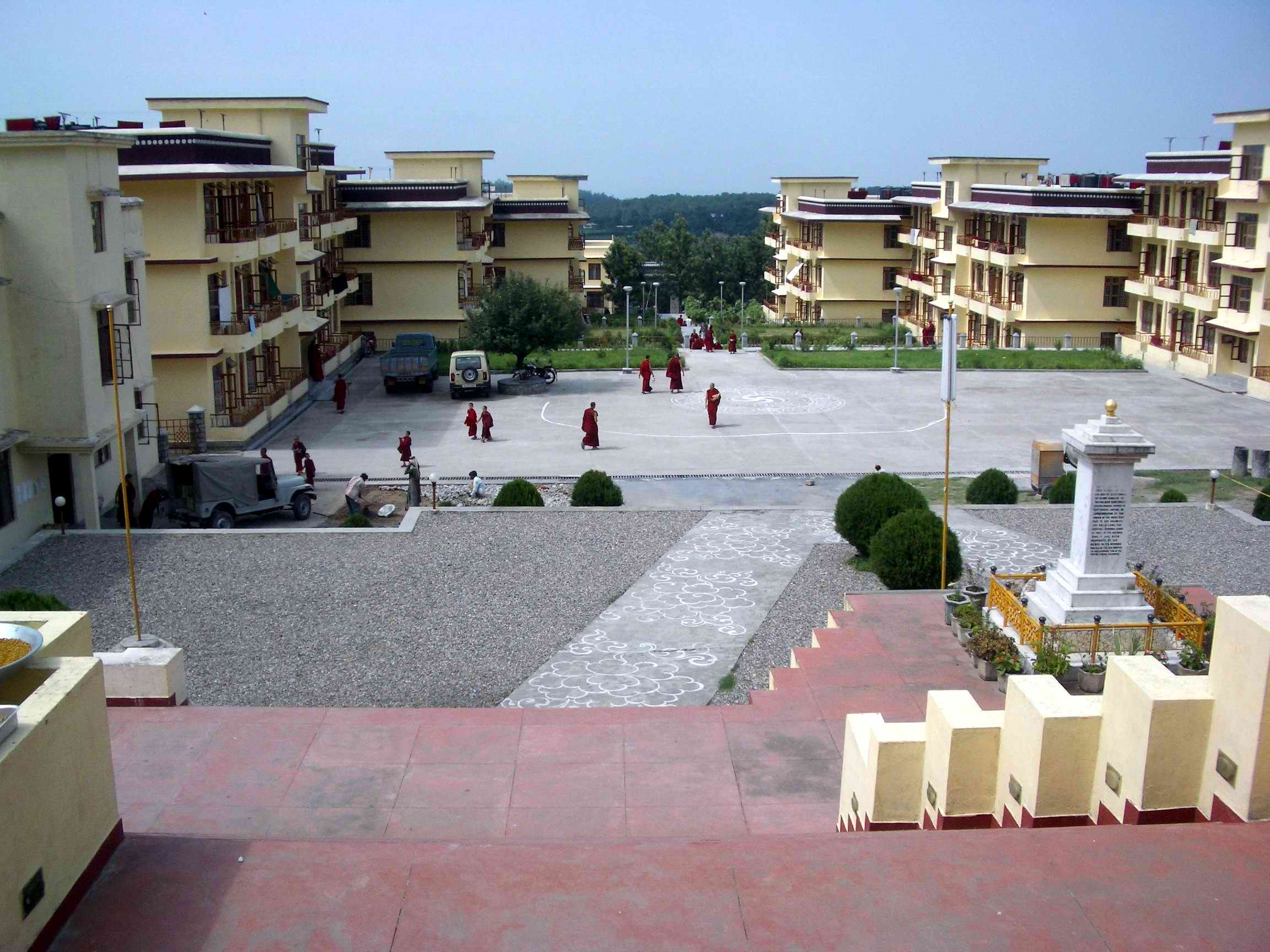
View of university buildings from Gyuto Gompa in India

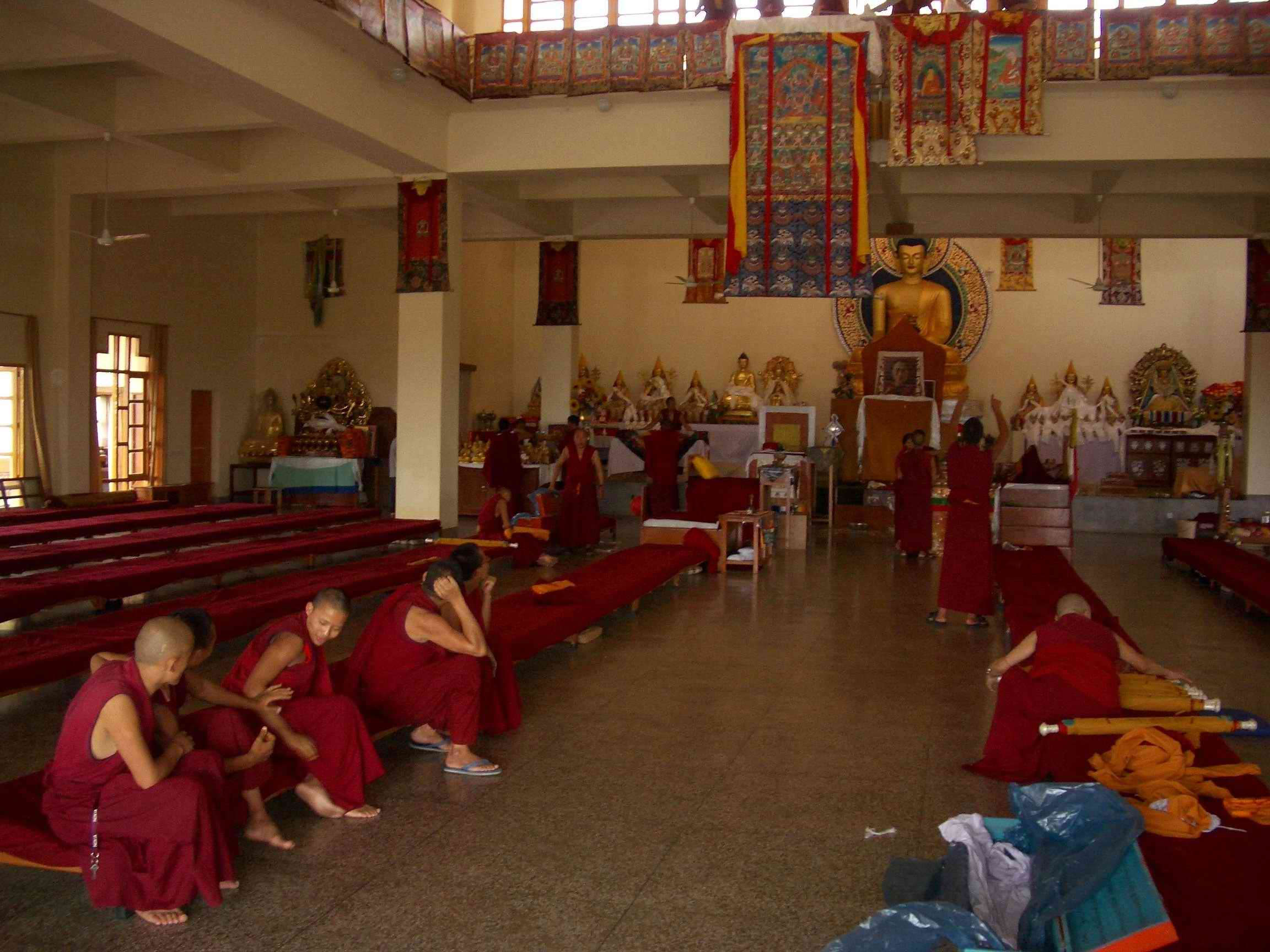
Inside main gompa (Gyuto, India)

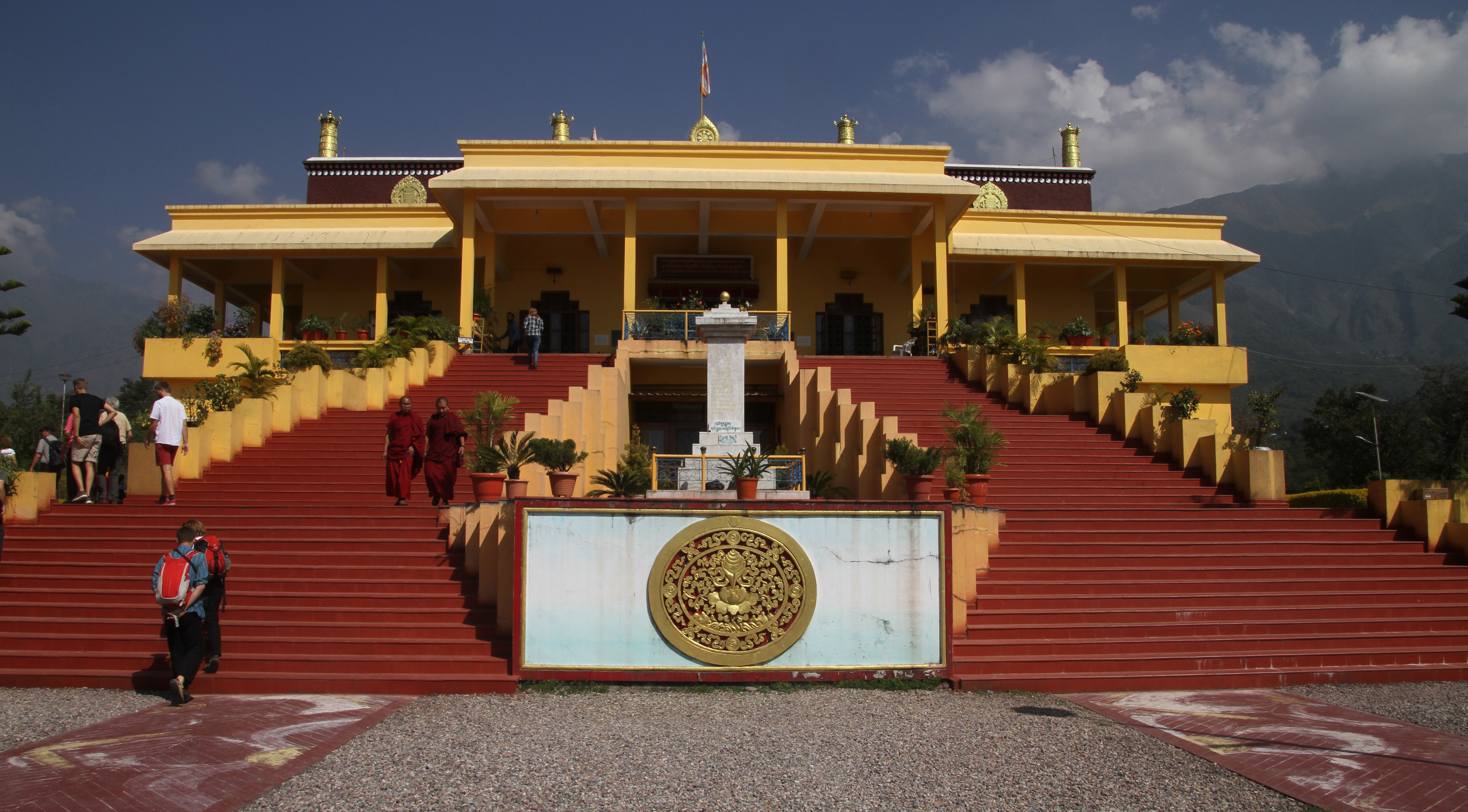
Gyuto Monastery in Dharamshala, India

Gyuto (also spelled Gyütö or Gyüto) Tantric University is one of the great monastic institutions of the Gelug Order.

== History ==
Gyuto (Tibetan: རྒྱུད་སྟོད།, Wylie: rgyud stod, THL: gyü-tö) was founded in 1475 by Jetsun Kunga Dhondup and is one of the main tantric colleges of the Gelug tradition. In Tibet, monks who had completed their geshe studies would be invited to join Gyuto or Gyume, another tantric institution, to receive a firm grounding in vajrayana practice. Both of these monasteries used to be in Lhasa, Tibet, but they have been re-established in India. At the time of the Chinese invasion in 1950, about 1000 monks were part of the monastery. On 21 March 1959, soon after the 14th Dalai Lama had left Lhasa for exile in India, Ramoche was a focus of military operations by the Chinese People's Liberation Army. "One especially valuable memoir is provided by the Fifth Yulo Rinpoche, a monk at Gyuto Upper Tantric College and organizer of defense of Ramoche Temple, who says that 'the Chinese Communists shot Tibetans indiscriminately, whether they had taken part in the resistance or not, and ambushed and killed many Tibetans who ran to Ngabo's house for sanctuary.' Another witness, Jampa Tenzin, has stated in a personal interview that he saw fleeing beggars and children slain near Ramoche Temple, a report corroborated in other Tibetan memoirs."

60 Gyuto monks fled to India in 1959. After initially gathering in Dalhousie, India, the monastery was established in Tenzing Gang, Arunachal Pradesh, India. The main monastery is now based in Sidhbari, near Dharamsala, India. Today, there are nearly 500 monks in the entire order. Ramoche Temple in Lhasa was located inside Gyuto Monastery.

The Gyuto monks are known for their tradition of overtone singing, also described as "chordal chanting" which is said to have been transmitted by their founder. It achieved renown in the West following the release of recordings made by David Lewiston in 1974 and in 1986 by Windham Hill Records.

In 1995, a group of Gyuto Monks travelled to the United States and performed during a series of concerts with the Grateful Dead. Under the name "Gyüto Monks Tantric Choir", they appeared on the Mickey Hart/Planet Drum album Supralingua, as well as the Van Halen album Balance.

== Gyuto monks in Australia ==
Since 1994 Gyuto monks have been visiting Australia taking part in cultural exchanges, tours, school visits and performances.

In 2003, a group of Gyuto monks performed at the wedding of Australian actress and singer Toni Collette.

In 2008, the monks assisted in the preparations for the five-day visit of the Dalai Lama at the Dome in Sydney Olympic Park. As tantric masters, the monks play a very specific role in the Gelug tradition of Tibetan Buddhism and thus were able to advise on, and carry out, the ritual requirements necessary for the Dalai Lama's program throughout the five days.

They created a full-size 2 metre sand mandala of Chenrezig (also known as Avalokiteśvara) in honour of the Dalai Lama, Buddha of Compassion himself and subject of the initiation ceremony.

In December 2008, the Gyuto Monks held their Happiness Tour of Australia at Bondi Beach Pavilion with a program of activities that included meditation, tantric art class and public talks.

In February 2009, the Gyuto monks performed a harmonic chanting ceremony at the Sydney premiere of the documentary Tibet: Murder in the Snow at Chauvel Cinema, Paddington, New South Wales.

In May 2009, the monks hosted early morning meditation sessions for attendees of the "Happiness and its Causes" conference in Sydney.

== Chants: The Spirit of Tibet (2013) ==
In June 2013, The Gyuto Monks of Tibet announced their signing to Universal Music, the world’s biggest record company. Their forthcoming album, ‘Chants: The Spirit of Tibet’, will be produced by Youth, the bassist for the post-punk rock band Killing Joke, whose production and remix credits include Primal Scream, U2, Paul McCartney, Depeche Mode and The Verve.

Youth said of the music "The Monks exemplify, in their mystical chants, the essence of Tibetan Tantric Wisdom and the profound philosophy of the Dalai Lama. This is a musical system intentionally designed to alter your consciousness towards an illuminated and enlightened state."

In addition to this, The Orb – widely known as the inventors of "ambient house" from the late 1980s – are remixing the famous Buddhist "chordal chanting" which has become the Buddhist musical trademark. The recording is co-produced and mixed by Tim Bran whose production and mixing credits include The Verve, La Roux and Scissor Sisters. Due for release on the Decca Records label, the album is being recorded at the monastery in Dharamsala, a remote former British hill station in the foothills of the Himalayas. It combines the Gyuto monks' distinctive chanting and the finest Tibetan musicians with the aim of transporting the listener to another world.

== Glastonbury 2013 ==
To mark the 100th anniversary of the Tibetan Declaration of Independence, the Gyuto Monks of Tibet performed at the 2013 Glastonbury Festival on 27 June 2013 in the Green Fields. They also created a ceremonial sand mandala, a Tibetan Buddhist tradition of building a symbolic picture of the universe out of coloured sand which, on completion, is dissolved and returned to the waters of the earth.

Thupten Phuntsok of the Gyuto monks said: "We are honoured to be invited to take part in the world’s premiere music and performing arts festival, at the spiritual centre of the site."

== Gallery ==
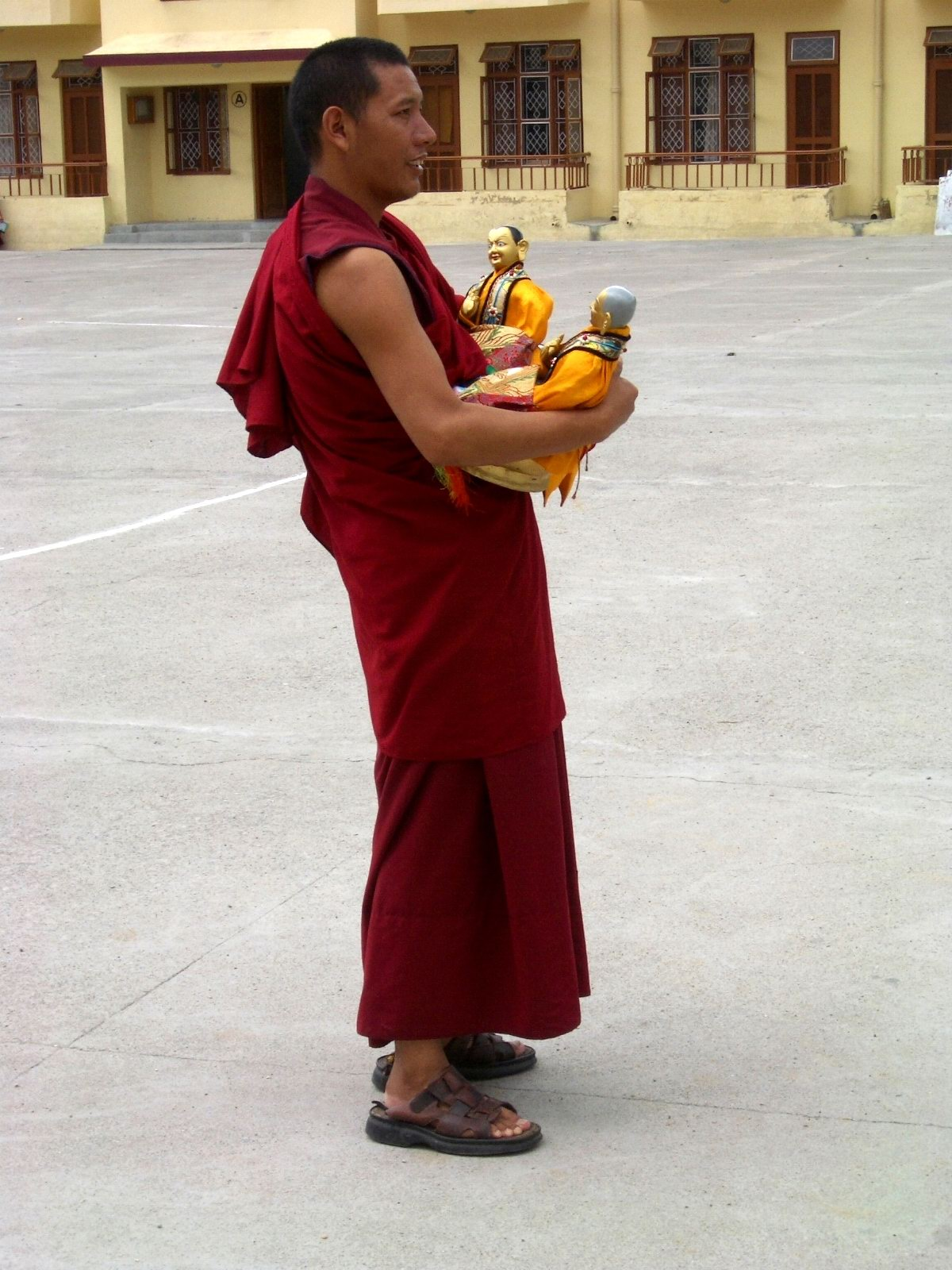
Gyuto monk carrying images

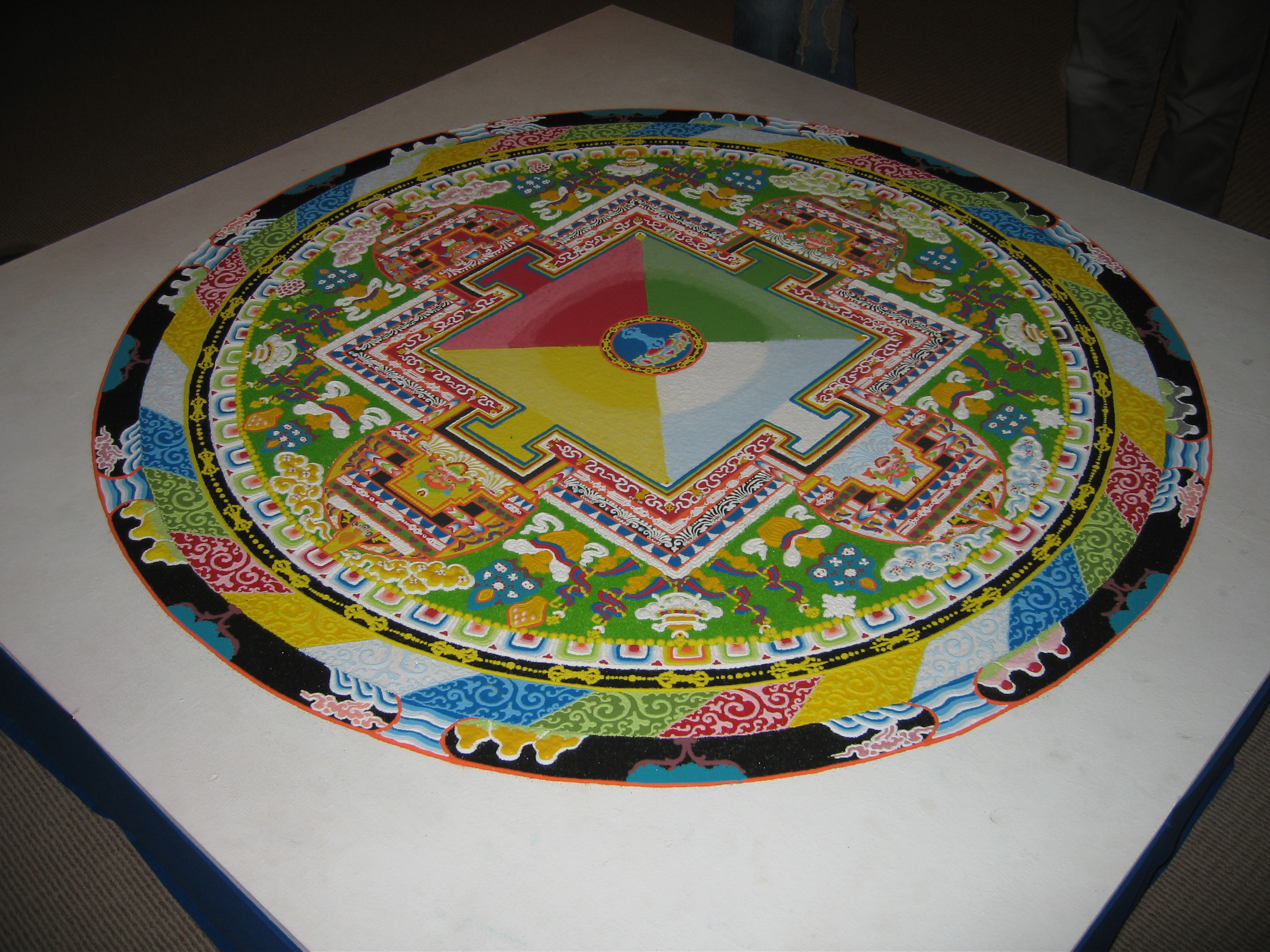
Gyuto mandala

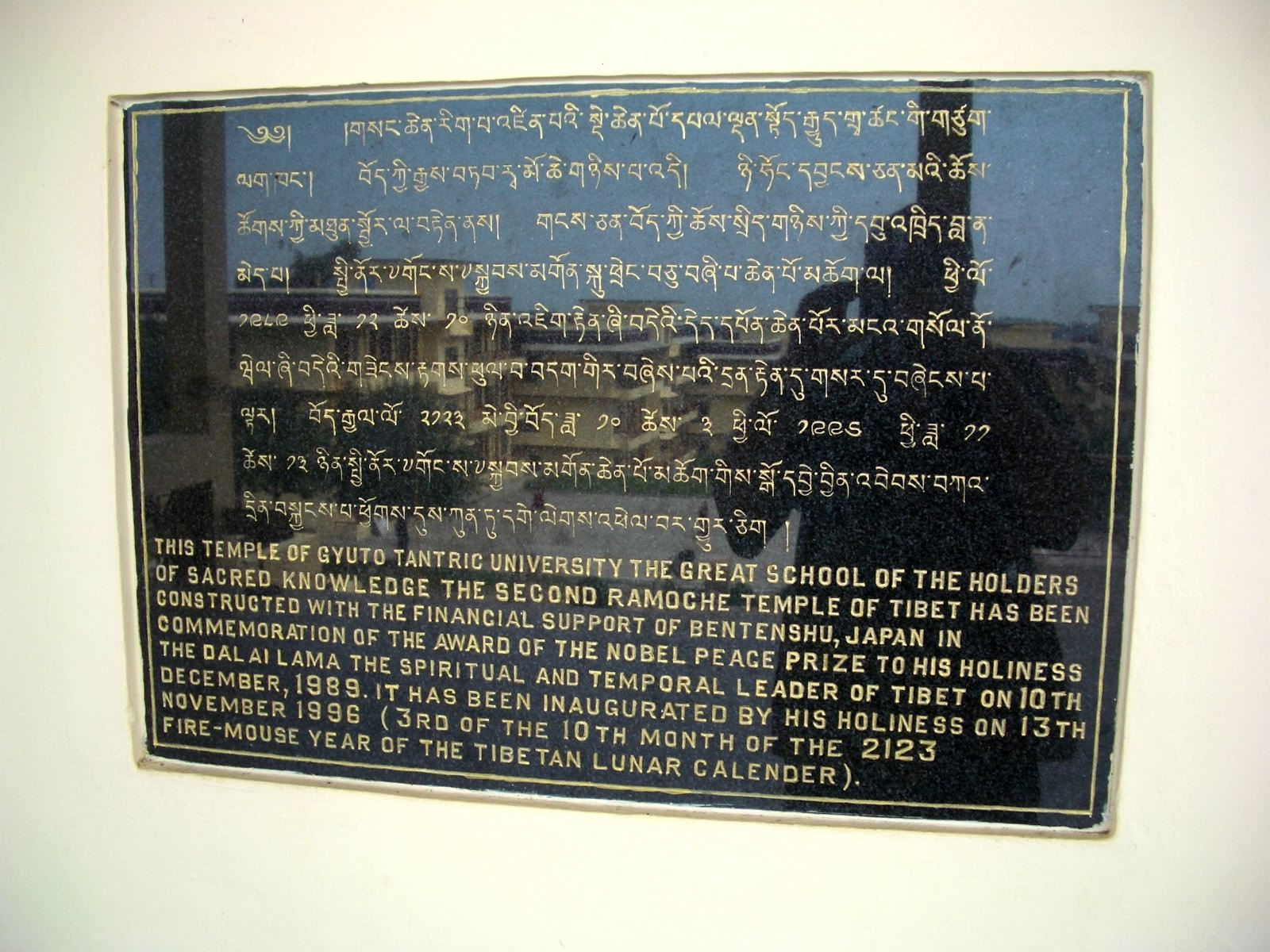
Dedication stone

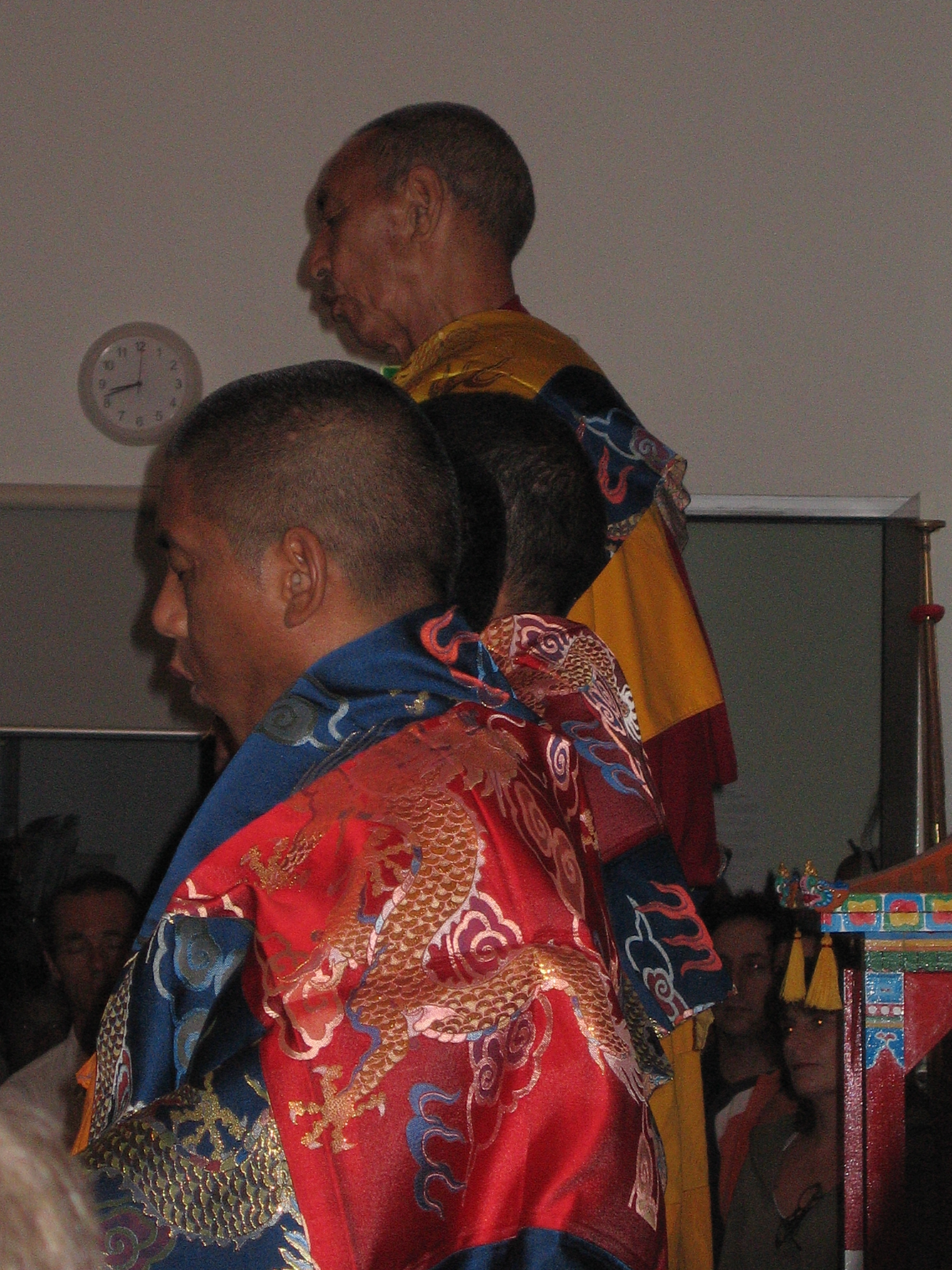
Gyuto monks chanting

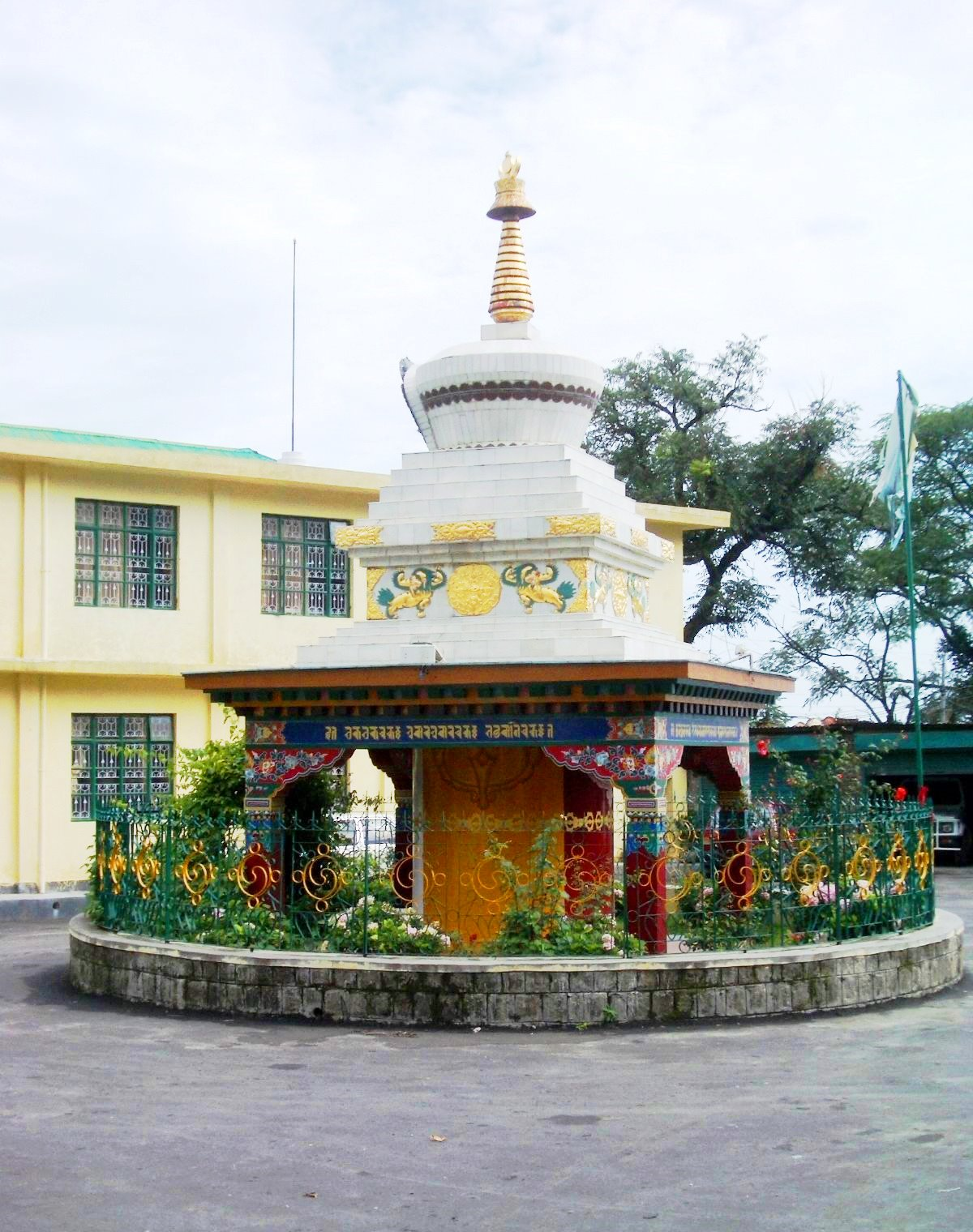
Small stupa at Gyuto University, Dharamsala

== Films ==
- 1974 – Tantra Of Gyüto: Sacred Rituals Of Tibet, directed by Sheldon Rochlin and Mark Elliott
- 1989 – The Gyuto Monks: Timeless Voices

== Discography ==
- Chants: The Spirit Of Tibet (2013)
- Tibetan Chants for World Peace, Gyuto Monks Tantric Choir (2008)
- Sounds of Global Harmony CD (2001)
- Om Mani Padme Hum : The Jewel In the Lotus (2001)
- The Practice of Contentment : A Meditation Guide
- Tantric Trilogy : The Gyuto Monks of Tibet
- Seven Years in Tibet: film soundtrack
  - Track 2 : Young Dalai Lama and Ceremonial Chant (includes excerpt from "Mahakala" written and performed by the Gyuto Monks Tantric Choir)
  - Track 6 : The Invasion (includes excerpt from "Yamantaka" written and performed by the Gyuto Monks Tantric Choir)(1997)
- Freedom Chants from the Roof of the World : The Gyuto Monks, The World (Rykodisc/Mickey Hart Series)(1989)
- Tibetan Tantric Choir : The Gyuto Monks (1986)
- Music of Tibet - Recorded by Huston Smith, CD produced by mondayMEDIA, released on the GemsTone label (1967)
