= Collegium Musicum Lviv =

Classical music institution in Ukraine

- Formation: 2011
- Location: Lviv, Ukraine
- Creative director: Taras Demko
- Art director: Ivan Ostapovych

Collegium Musicum Lviv is an artistic community and music agency in Lviv, Ukraine that specializes in classical music. The activities of the music agency are aimed at promoting music and poetry, involving the public in co-creation, and bridging the gap between the performer and the listener.

== Origin of the name ==
The name "Collegium Musicum" was given to musical societies in German cities in the 17th to the 18th centuries, which arose at schools or universities. Such groups at one time included J. S. Bach, G. P. Telemann, F. Kuhlau, and others.

Many modern collectives and communities in different countries use this name.

Collegium Musicum Lviv was founded in 2012. The founders are conductor Ivan Ostapovich, poet Taras Demko, violinists Pyotr Tityaev, Igor Zavgorodny, and Orest Smovzh. Collegium Musicum unites a wide range of creative personalities: musicians; writers, actors, journalists, etc.) in order to create a cultural space — as a platform for a young artist to attract an active listener.

== Collegium Musicum Chamber Orchestra ==
The Collegium Musicum Chamber Orchestra was founded in 2014, on the basis of the art community of the same name in Lviv. The initiators of the collective were conductor Ivan Ostapovich and poet, literary critic Taras Demko.

Over the years of its existence, the orchestra has become famous in Ukraine and abroad. It is a participant in prestigious music festivals in Lviv and it collaborates with such famous musicians as conductor Lev Markiz, pianists Andrei Gavrilov, Antonii Baryshevskyi, Dmitro Choni, violinists Sergey Ostrovsky, Kirill Sharapov, Igor Zavgorodny, Orest Smovzh, cellist Denis Severin, vocalists Christian Gilz, Richard Resch, and Tatiana Zhuravel.

The orchestra's repertoire includes music from different eras, from baroque to modern.

A special feature of the orchestra is that it consists entirely of young and proactive musicians of the country.

The Collegium Musicum Orchestra made its debut at the final concert of the festival "Days of Bach Music by Collegium Musicum," and then at the chamber music festival "Winter Evenings by Collegium Musicum." The band's creations consist of programs of rarely performed and almost unknown music to the Ukrainian listener. In particular, the orchestra performed works by French court composers Rameau and Luli for the first time in Lviv.

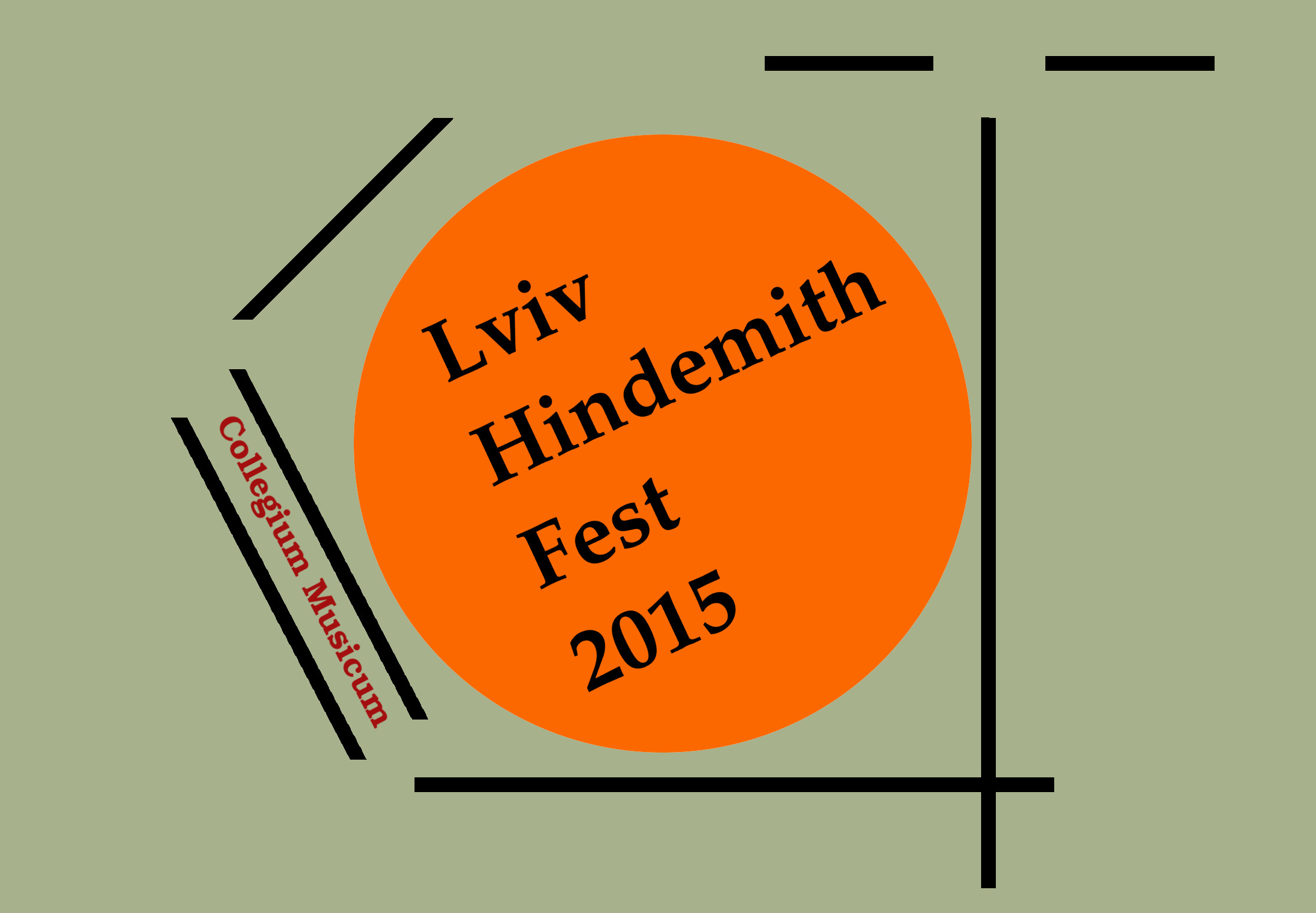
Lviv Hindemith Fest 2015

== Activities ==
Organization of festivals:

- Bach Music Days Festival (May, June, 2014)
- Chamber Music Festival "Winter Evenings" (December 2014)
- Collegium Fest: "Winter Season" (December 2015)
- "Lviv Hindemith Fest" (September, 2015)

Participation in festivals:

- Participation in the International Festival "Virtuosi" (2015, 2016)
- Participation in the festival "Night in Lviv" (2013, 2014, 2015, 2016)
- Participation and organizational activities in the "Kyiv Contemporary Music Days Festival" (2015)
- Participation and organizational activities at "Bach Marathon" 2015

Other projects:

- Project "Music Of Versailles" (the first performance in Lviv of orchestral music by French court composers).
- More than half a thousand concert projects with various programs with the participation of young professional musicians (2012–2016).
- CM Recordings Label 2015. Recordings of World Classics with the participation of young Ukrainian musicians, with the aim of releasing an audio disk.
- Publication of the translation of the libretto of the first surviving opera, "Eurydice" by J. Peri.
- Publication of the online publication "Chasopis |A:|" (articles, interviews, and analytics about culture and personalities)
- Lecture projects (2014, 2015): more than 20 lectures on various topics — music, literature, general cultural topics.
- A joint project with the world-famous pianist Andrey Gavrilov and an online broadcast of a concert from the Lviv Philharmonic (Radio Skovoroda)
- Author's program about classical music "Territory of Classics" on Radio Skovoroda (2016, 2017)
- A project to find and publish archival recordings and monuments of the musical history of Galicia.

"The unique audio archives where artifacts of their time are stored remain unencrypted and unknown. Most of them are available in a single copy and saved on technically outdated media. If we do not digitize this legacy in the near future, we risk losing it forever, and therefore losing our own historical memory forever."

== International competition of composers in Lviv ==
The International competition of composers in Lviv was a project in cooperation with the Department of culture, nationalities, and religions, the Lviv state regional administration / and the Lviv Philharmonic. Composers from any country born no earlier than November 10, 1981, were invited to participate in the competition.

The competition requirement was a piece for a string orchestra lasting from 10 to 17 minutes, which was never performed publicly and was not recorded or replicated on audio or video media, or put up for public access on the internet. The winners were composers Denis Bocharov, Vitaly Kiyanitsa, and Evgeny Petrov – recordings of their works performed at the gala concert are published on the Official Youtube channel of Collegium Musicum.

== See also ==
- Collegium Musicum
