= Collegium Musicum de Caracas =

Venezuelan musical group

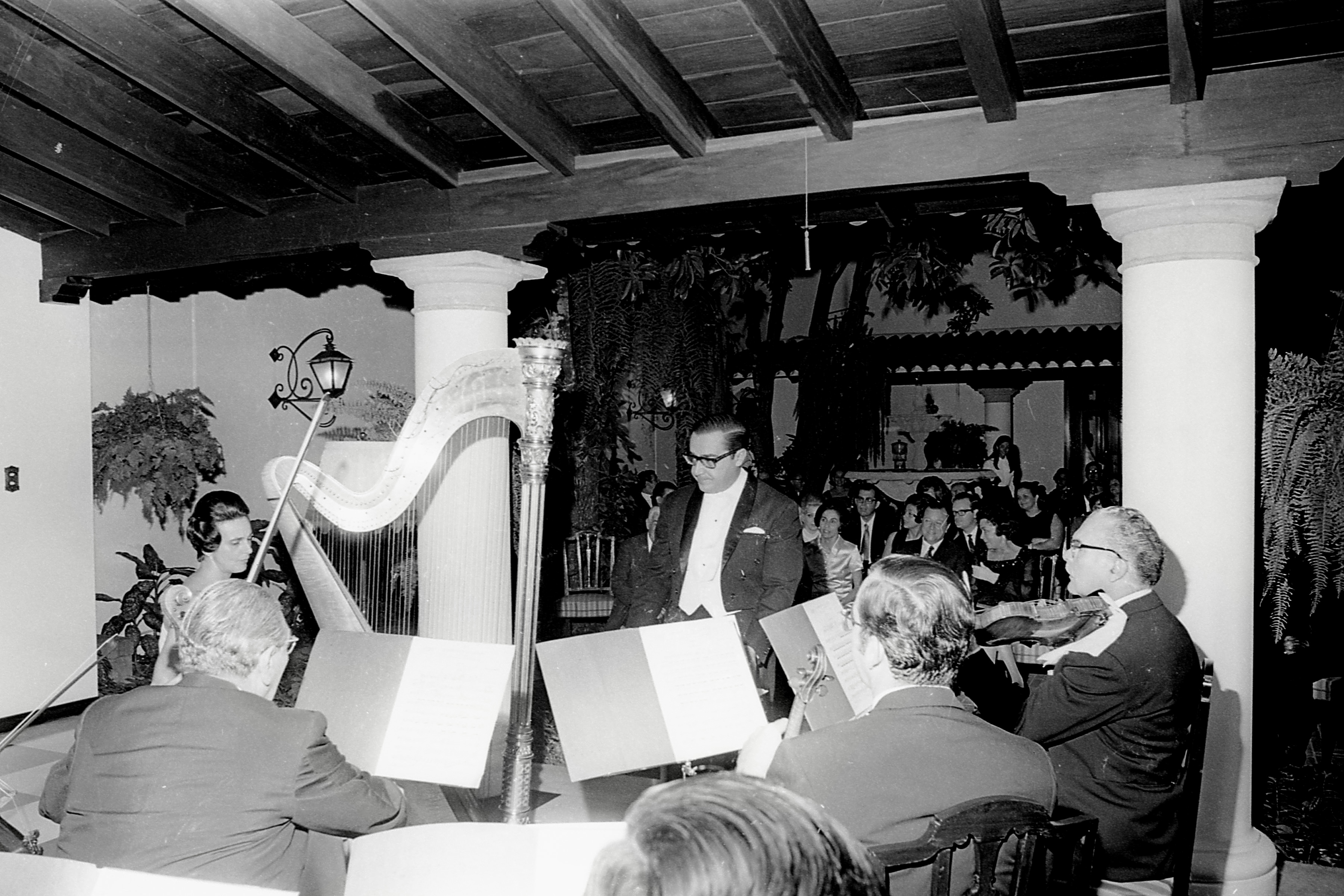
Gonzalo Castellanos conducting the Collegium Musicum during a concert at the presidential residence La Casona in 1970.

Collegium Musicum de Caracas was a Venezuelan musical group (1964–1976), founded by Evencio Castellanos. Its works include:

- Ballet miniatura, of Blanca Estrella de Méscoli, winner of the 1965 National Prize for Music.
- Sinfonieta Satírica of Inocente Carreño.

== Group members in 1965 ==
- Musical director: Gonzalo Castellanos Yumar
- Flute: Juan Durán
- Oboe: Julian Oliva
- Clarinet: Aurelio Berardi
- Bassoon: Heinz K. Tesch
- Horn: Cesare Esposito
- Harp: Cecilia de Majo
- Piano: Adriana Moraga
- Violin number 1: Mario Mescoli
- Violin number 2: Gianfranco Farina
- Viola: Siro Rabitti
- Violoncello: Enrico Marcelli
- Double bass: Omar Sansone

== Sources ==
- Information from the album: Collegium Musicum de Caracas, Premio Nacional de Música 1965

== See also ==
- Venezuela
- Venezuelan music
