= Collegium Musicum =

German musical societies during the Reformation

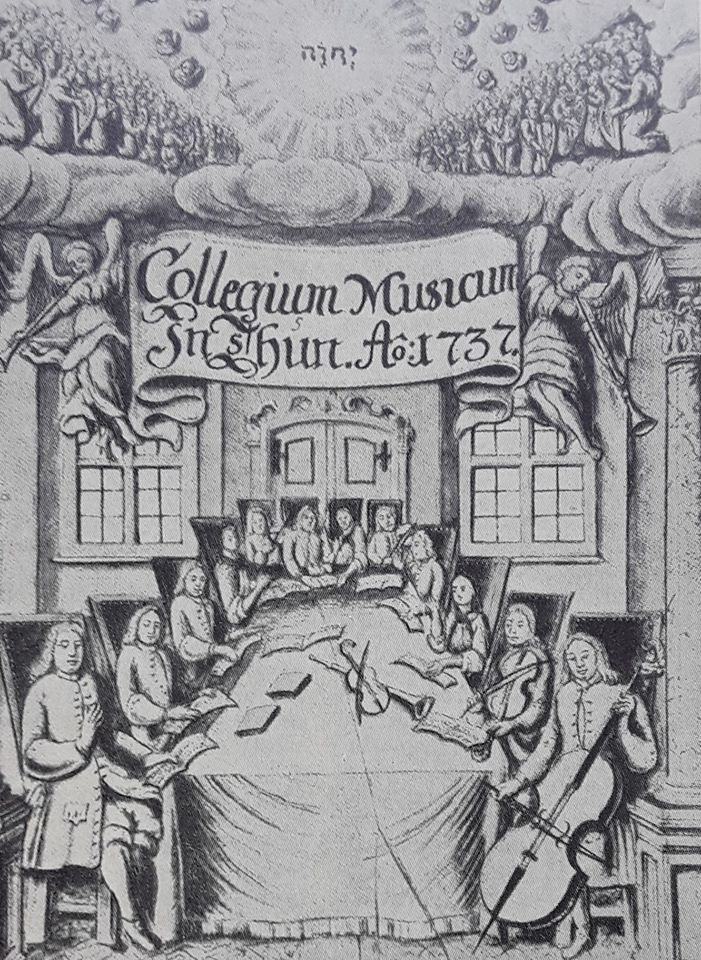
Collegium musicum of Thun, 1737, Switzerland

The Collegium Musicum was one of several types of musical societies that arose in German and German-Swiss cities and towns during the Reformation and thrived into the mid-18th century. In the present day, the term is applied to a variety of early music ensembles.

Generally, while societies such as the Kantorei (chorale) cultivated vocal music for church performance and the convivium musicum discussed musical philosophy over a banquet, the collegia musica performed both vocal and instrumental music for pleasure; they focused on instrumental music as it rose in stature during the Baroque era. Though closed amateur societies in concept, collegia frequently included professionals to fill out the music and admitted non-members to performances. Moreover, they often provided music for church, state, and academic occasions and gained the patronage of leading citizens. From the 1660s, their functions largely constituted the beginnings of public concert life in Germany.

== Leipzig ==
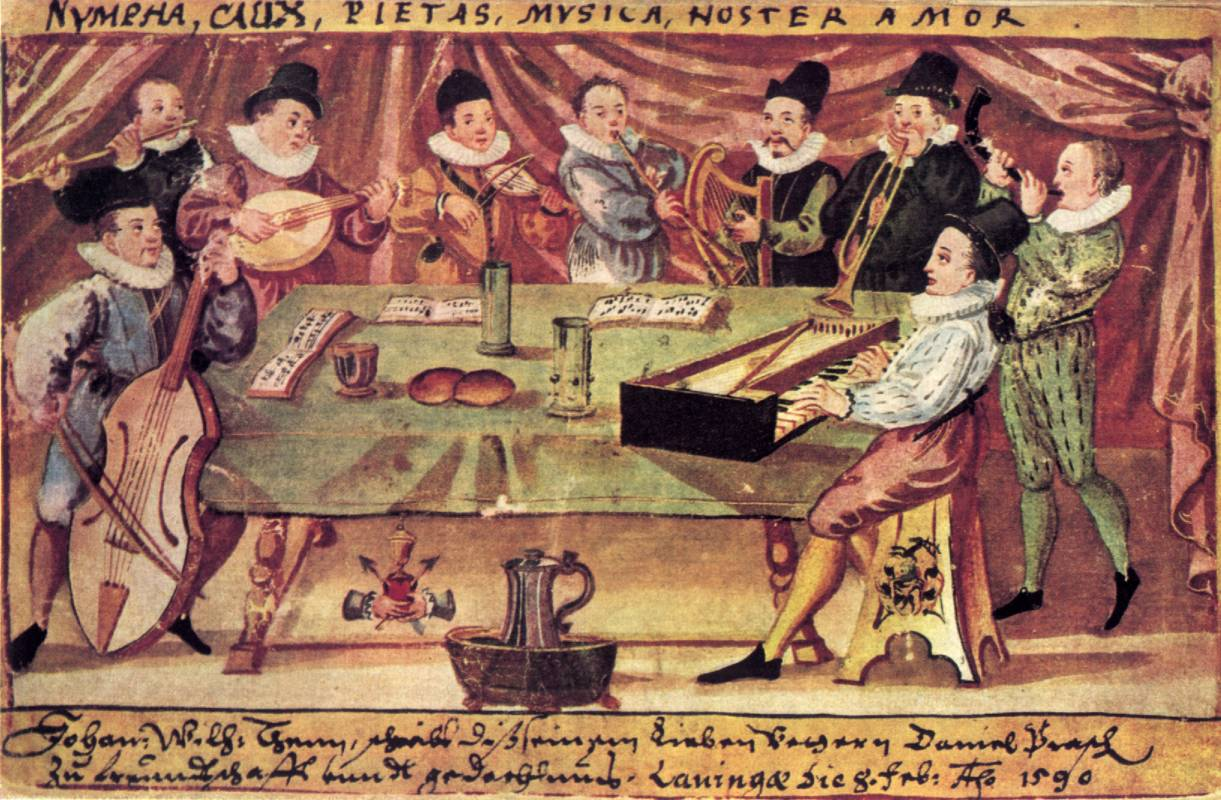
Collegium Musicum, Lauingen, 1590 A.D. From the left: viol, flute, mandora or gittern, fiddle or rebec, shawm, harp, slide trumpet or clarion trumpet, cornett, clavichord.

Leipzig collegia musica, consisting mostly of university students, enjoyed a succession of particularly illustrious directors, including Johann Kuhnau (1688), refounded by Telemann (1702), and Bach (1729–1737), who composed several concertos and dramme per musica for weekly performances at Café Zimmermann, Gottfried Zimmerman's coffeehouse, and for "extraordinary" concerts. Telemann went on to promote professional concerts by Frankfurt and Hamburg collegia in the late 1720s, thus fostering the emergence of public subscription concerts in Germany. With the Moravian emigration, American collegia sprang up beginning in 1744 in Pennsylvania, Maryland, Ohio, and the Carolinas.

In 1909, Hugo Riemann refounded the Leipzig collegium within the university, initiating a widespread modern trend in German and American universities to foster the performance of early music on original instruments or replicas. The term collegium musicum has thus come to be associated in large measure with university ensembles that perform early music, though from a historical perspective, the term need not imply any restriction in repertory.

== Other cities ==
Although the Collegium Musicum (Leipzig) became the most famous, due to its association with Bach, other cities had similar institutions. The Collegium Musicum (Hamburg) was an amateur musical ensemble founded in Hamburg in the 17th century by Matthias Weckmann, as a complement to the professional Hamburger Ratsmusik.

== Modern ensembles ==
Various modern ensembles have taken the name, including:

- Cambridge University Collegium Musicum
- The Collegium Musicum of University of Heidelberg
- The Collegium musicum Bonn of University of Bonn
- The Collegium Musicum of Martin Luther University of Halle-Wittenberg
- The Collegium Musicum of London
- Collegium Musicum Jamaica
- The Collegium Musicum of the Eastman School of Music, University of Rochester
- The Harvard-Radcliffe Collegium Musicum
- The Collegium Musicum of Columbia University
- The Collegium Musicum of Duke University
- The Collegium Musicum of the University of Arizona
- The Collegium Musicum of Moravian College
- Collegium Musicum of Muhlenberg College
- The Collegium Musicum of the University of Notre Dame
- Collegium Musicum 90, an English baroque orchestra
- Collegium Musicum Basle, Switzerland
- Collegium Musicum Bergen, Bergen, Norway
- Collegium Musicum Den Haag, The Netherlands
- L.S.K.O. Collegium Musicum Leiden, The Netherlands
- Rutgers Collegium Musicum
- Collegium Musicum Oberliniense
- The Collegium Musicum of Reed College
- Collegium Musicum of St. Olaf College
- Collegium Musicum of Rowan University
- Collegium Musicum, a Slovak art rock band formed by Marián Varga
- The Collegium Musicum of Colorado College
- Collegium Musicum of Luther College
- Collegium Musicum Hong Kong
- Collegium Musicum de Buenos Aires
- Collegium Musicum Cabell Midland High School
- The Yale Collegium Musicum (founded by Paul Hindemith)
- The University of Toronto Collegium Musicum (directed by Ivars Taurins)
- Collegium Musicum Lviv (Ukraine)
- Collegium Musicum of University of Calgary
- Collegium Musicum of University of Connecticut
- Collegium Musicum of Warsaw University
- Collegium Musicum of Karlsruhe Institute of Technology
- Collegium Musicum of Kiel University
