= New Collegium =

- Origin: The Hague, The Netherlands
- Genres: Early Music; Baroque Music
- Years active: 2006–Present
- Labels: Ramée, ORF Edition Alte Musik
- Members: Claudio Ribeiro; Inês d'Avena; Sara DeCorso; Rebecca Rosen
- Website: https://en.newcollegium.com/

New Collegium (formerly known as Collegium Musicum Den Haag) is a baroque orchestra and chamber ensemble based in The Netherlands. The orchestra was founded in 2006 by Brazilian/Italian harpsichordist Claudio Ribeiro.

New Collegium is modeled after the collegium musicum of the Baroque era, an organized association of musicians that held regular meetings for the performance of music. Many of these organizations were established by university students (such as Georg Philipp Telemann, Johann Kuhnau, Johann Friedrich Fasch) who were keen to present their musical ideas to the public. These collegia musica were not directly associated with the universities themselves. Similarly, although New Collegium is not formally linked to the Royal Conservatory of The Hague, nearly all of its members are graduates from this conservatory.

In 2016, the ensemble was a prize-winner at the International Van Wassenaer Competition and "ensemble in residence" at the 27th International Early Music Festival of Juiz de Fora in Brazil. New Collegium performs at such renowned festivals as the Utrecht Early Music Festival (NL), MAfestival Brugge (BE), Itinéraire Baroque (FR), Internationale Baroktage Stift Melk (AT), and Opus Amadeus Festival (TR).

The ensemble's third CD, Chameleon, was awarded the Diapason d'Or, Toccata CD des Monats and De keuze van Klara in 2019.

== Discography ==
2006: l'europe réunie (ORF Edition Alte Musik) Georg Philipp Telemann: Wasser-Ouvertüre in C / Antonio Vivaldi: Concerto for 2 violins, 2 recorders, 2 oboes, bassoon & strings RV 566 / Johann Sebastian Bach: Concerto for harpsichord, 2 recorders, 2 violins, viola & b.c. BWV 1057 / Unico Wilhelm van Wassenaer: Concerto armonico Nr. 5 / Jean-Féry Rebel: Fantaisie

2015: Empfindsam (Collegium) Carl Philipp Emanuel Bach: Symphony in D Major, Wq. 183.1 / Carl Philipp Emanuel Bach: Concerto for harpsichord and orchestra in E Major, Wq. 14 / Francesco Barbella: Concerto III from '24 concerti del manoscritto di Napoli' / Carl Philipp Emanuel Bach: Sonata in A Minor for violin, cello and obbligato harpsichord, Wq. 90:01 / Wilhelm Friedemann Bach: Symphony in F Major, F.67 ("Dissonanzen Sinfonie")

2019: Chameleon (Ramée / Outhere Music) Georg Philipp Telemann: Quartet in E Minor, TWV 43:e4: Prélude / Sonata a flauto dolce, violino e cembalo in A minor, TWV 42:a4 / Menuet 17 in C Major, TWV 34:67 / Sonata a Violino, Violoncello e Basso in G Major, TWV 42:G7 / Menuet 38 in F Major, TWV 34:88 / Suite from Der getreue Music-Meister / Menuet 7 in A Minor, TWV 34:57 / Concerto à 3 - 2 Violini Discordati e Violone in A Major, TWV Anh. 42:A1 / Menuet 48 in G Major, TWV 34:48 / Quartet in G Minor, TWV 43:g4 / Quartet in E Minor, TWV 43:e4: Modéré

2020: Empfindsam (Ramée / Outhere Music) - digital-only re-release
