= Roland Douatte =

French classical violinist and conductor

Roland Douatte (7 December 1921, in Paris – 16 December 1992, in Paris) was a French classical violinist and conductor.

A self-taught violinist, he founded his own chamber orchestra, the "Collegium Musicum of Paris" in 1952.

Roland Douatte is one of the first conductors to be interested and to make Vivaldi's The Four Seasons and other musics of the Baroque era known, including Delalande's Simphonies pour les soupers du Roi.

In 1967, he became music director of the Festival du Marais.
