= Konnakol =

South Indian Carnatic musical art

Konnakol (also spelled Konokol, Konakkol, Konnakkol) (Tamil: கொன்னக்கோல் koṉṉakkōl) (Malayalam: വായ്ത്താരി) (Telugu: కొన్నకోల్)is the art of performing percussion syllables vocally in South Indian Carnatic music. Konnakol is derived from Telugu (koni - to recite), it translates to “reciting the rhythmic syllables”. Konnakol is the spoken component of solkattu, which refers to a combination of konnakol syllables spoken while simultaneously counting the tala (meter) with the hand. It is comparable in some respects to bol in Hindustani music, as both allow for the composition, memorization, communication, and performance of rhythms. A similar concept in Hindustani classical music is called padhant.

== Usage ==
Musicians from a variety of traditions have found konnakol useful in their practice. Prominent among these is John McLaughlin, who led the Mahavishnu Orchestra and has long used konnakol as a compositional aid. V. Selvaganesh, who plays alongside McLaughlin in the group Remember Shakti, and Ranjit Barot, who plays with McLaughlin in the group 4th Dimension, are other noted konnakol virtuosos. A few of the prominent names performing konnakol are B K Chandramouli, Dr T K Murthy, B C Manjunath, Somashekhar Jois, and Mattias 'IA' Eklundh of Freak Kitchen.

Danish musician Henrik Andersen wrote the book Shortcut To Nirvana (2005) and the DVD Learn Konnakol (2014). Andersen was a student of Trilok Gurtu (India) and Pete Lockett (UK).

Trumpeter, composer, arranger, and bandleader Don Ellis also utilized the technique extensively in his own compositions and arrangements for his own big band. Ellis would use konnakol in live performance having the members of his entire orchestra actually do the vocalizations of rhythms most notably on a piece entitled "Open Wide", that he performed at the 1977 Montreux Jazz Festival.

Subash Chandran's disciple Dr Joel, who teaches konnakol in the UK, is noted for incorporating it into rock and Western classical music, notably in a concerto commissioned in 2007 by the viola soloist Rivka Golani. The trio J G Laya (Chandran, Sri Thetakudi Harihara Vinayakram, and Dr Joel) showcased the konnakol of Chandran and helped the previously fading art form return to prominence in the 1980s. Chandran released an instructional DVD on konnakol in 2007. McLaughlin and Selvaganesh also released an instructional DVD on konnakol in 2007.

Jazz saxophonist, konnakol artist, and composer Arun Luthra incorporates konnakol and Carnatic music rhythms (as well as Hindustani classical music rhythms) in his work. More recently, drummer Steve Smith has also incorporated konnakol in his performances with vital information and his clinics. In 2022 Taladiddle written by Claudio Fischer and Claus Hessler was published a book comparing and contrasting konnakol to rudiments.

Konnakol should not be confused with the practice in Hindustani music (the classical music of northern India) of speaking tabla "bols", which indicate the finger placement to be used by a percussionist. By contrast, konnakol syllables are aimed at optimising vocal performance, and vastly outnumber any commonly used finger placements on mridangam or any other hand percussion instrument. Further, all the differences between Carnatic and north Indian rhythms apply equally to konnakol and tabla bols.

The artist improvises within a structure that interrelates with the raga being played and within the talam preferred in the compositions. In mridangam, kanjira, or ghatam, the percussion is limited to physical characteristics of their structure and construction: the resonance of skin over jackfruit wood, clay shells, or clay pots. The human voice has a direct and dramatic way of expressing the percussive aspects in music directly.

Trichy Shri R Thayumanavar gave a rebirth to konnakol. His disciple Andankoil AVS Sundararajan, a vocal and miruthangam Vidwan, is a konnakol expert, as is Mridangam Vidwan Shri T. S. Nandakumar.

== Solkattu ==
Konnakol uses rhythmic solfege for different subdivisions of the beat called "Solkattu." Common ones are:

- 2 subdivisions (Chatusra 1/2 Speed): Tha Ka
- 3 subdivisions (Tisra): Tha Ki Ta
- 4 subdivisions (Chatusra): Tha Ka Dhi Mi
- 5 subdivisions (Khanda): Tha Dhi Gi Na Thom
- 6 subdivisions (Tisra Double Speed): Tha Ka Dhi Mi Tha Ka
- 7 subdivisions (Misra): Tha Ka Di Mi Tha Ki Ta
- 8 subdivisions (Chatusra Double Speed): Tha Ka Dhi Mi Tha Ka Jho Nu
- 9 subdivisions (Sankirna): Tha Ka Dhi Mi Ta Dhi Gi Na Thom
- 10 subdivisions (Khanda Double Speed): Tha Ka Tha Ki Ta Tha Dhi Gi Na Thom, or Tha Ki Ta Dhim†2 Tha Dhi Gi Na Thom

† '2' suffix signifies solfege syllable is held twice as long

== See also ==
- Bol (music) – Rhythm-defining syllable in North Indian classical music
- Counting (music) – Musical system of regularly occurring sounds
- Kuchi shōga – System of notation for traditional Japanese drums
