= Remember Shakti (album) =

Live album by Remember Shakti
- Released: 13 April 1999
- Recorded: 1997
- Genre: World
- Length: 132:28
- Label: Verve
- Producers: John McLaughlin, Jean-Philippe Allard, Daniel Richard

Remember Shakti chronology
Natural Elements (1977)	Remember Shakti (1999)	Remember Shakti – The Believer (2000)

Remember Shakti is a live album by the world fusion band Remember Shakti recorded in England over four nights in 1997, and released in 1999 on the Verve label. The reformed group features original members of the 1970s group Shakti - John McLaughlin (guitar), Zakir Hussain (tabla) and Vikku Vinayakram (ghatam) - who are joined by Hariprasad Chaurasia on the bansuri (Indian flute). The album reached number 14 in the Billboard Top Jazz albums chart.

The album features three compositions by McLaughlin and two by Chaurasia. Of the McLaughlin pieces, "The Wish" previously appeared on the 1995 McLaughlin album The Promise. "Lotus Feet" was included on the 1976 Mahavishnu Orchestra album Inner Worlds, with a truncated version appearing on the 1976 live album Shakti. "Zakir" was previously heard on the 1987 Hussein album Making Music as well as on the McLaughlin album "Concerto For Guitar & Orchestra 'The Mediterranean' - Duos For Guitar & Piano" (1988). The album was presented by John McLaughlin together with Remember Shakti who gave a concert at the Montreux jazz festival in Switzerland (Verve night - Miles Davis Hall) at the same concert were the members of Verve with the Greek singer Eleftheria Arvanitaki, the Greek guitarist Adonis Mitzelos (2000)and Mari Boine on July 8, 1999.

== Reception ==
Professional ratings
Review scores
Source	Rating
Allmusic	3/5 stars
All About Jazz	(favorable)
JazzTimes	(favorable)
The Penguin Guide to Jazz Recordings	3/4 stars

In a review for AllMusic, Heather Phares commented that, in comparison with the original version of Shakti, "Remember Shakti has a more meditative, fluid feel... but McLaughlin's subtle, hypnotic guitar work bridges Shakti's past and present... An emotionally rich, musically accomplished album, Remember Shakti reunites a unique group of players." The authors of the Penguin Guide to Jazz Recordings awarded the album 3 stars and wrote: "there is plenty of virtuosic playing and a joyous abandon which fans of the original group will value." Writing for All About Jazz, Walter Kolosky stated: "Remember Shakti is reflective, serious East-meets-West music. It is not without some hilarity however—Vikku's laughter can be quite contagious. It is also not without some truly virtuoso moments and plenty of drama."

== Track listing ==
=== Disc one ===
1. "Chandrakauns" (Hariprasad Chaurasia) – 33:35
2. "The Wish" (John McLaughlin) – 18:40
3. "Lotus Feet" (John McLaughlin) – 7:33

=== Disc two ===
1. "Mukti" (Hariprasad Chaurasia) – 63:30
2. "Zakir" (John McLaughlin) – 9:10

== Personnel ==
- Hariprasad Chaurasia – bansuri
- Zakir Hussain – tabla
- John McLaughlin – guitar, synthesizer
- Vikku Vinayakram – ghatam

Other credits

- Jean-Philippe Allard – executive producer
- Jean Luc Barilla – design
- Max Costa – mastering, mixing
- Sven Hoffman – engineer, mixing assistant
- Christian Pégand – production coordination
- Daniel Richard – executive producer
