= George Brooks (musician) =

American saxophonist

- Born: 1956 (age 69–70)
- Origin: New York City
- Genres: Jazz, blues, fusion, funk, R&B
- Occupation: Musician
- Instrument: Saxophone
- Website: www.georgebrooks.com

George Brooks (born 1956) is an American saxophonist known for combining jazz and Indian classical music. He is the founder of the jazz fusion groups Summit, Aspada, Bombay Jazz, the Raga Bop Trio, and Elements.

Brooks was introduced to the world of Indian classical music by Kirana vocal guru, Pandit Pran Nath, whose music has influenced the works of Terry Riley and La Monte Young. Brooks is a long time associate of Terry Riley. He has performed with Riley in the US, Canada, Asia, and Europe as a duo, in trio settings with sitarist Krishna Bhatt and percussionist Talvin Singh, and as a founding member of Riley's Khayal Ensemble. Brooks appears as a soloist on Riley's June Buddhas with the Brooklyn Philharmonic and with the Kronos Quartet for Riley's 80th birthday celebrations.

== Groups ==
Brooks founded Summit with Zakir Hussain, Steve Smith, Kai Eckhardt and Fareed Haque; Aspada with Selvaganesh Vinayakaram, Osam Ezzeldin, and Kai Eckhardt; Bombay Jazz with Larry Coryell and Ronu Majumdar; the Raga Bop Trio with Steve Smith and Carnatic guitarist Prasanna; and Elements with Indian violinist Kala Ramnath and Dutch harpist Gwyneth Wentink.

Brooks has toured extensively with blues and R&B artists Etta James, Frankie Lee, Freddie Hughes, Otis Rush, Albert Collins, Clarence "Gatemouth" Brown, Sonny Rhodes as well as pop innovators Ray Manzarek, The Temptations, The Four Tops, and jazz luminaries, John McLaughlin, Larry Coryell, Wadada Leo Smith, and Anthony Braxton. In 2008 Brooks was a featured soloist on John McLaughlin's Floating Point album, which was, nominated for a Grammy Award for best contemporary jazz album.

Brooks is the pioneer of Indo-Jazz and has done significant cross-cultural explorations with leading artists of Indian Classical Music including Zakir Hussain, Hariprasad Chaurasia, Sultan Khan, Shankar Mahadevan, Krishna Bhatt, L. Subramaniam, V. Selvaganesh, Kala Ramnath, Mahesh Kale and many others.

=== As composer ===
Brooks's work as a composer has been recognized with numerous awards and commissions. In 2004 he received an Arts International grant to develop compositions with Kathak choreographer Shama Bhate in Pune India and an Arts International Touring grant to perform at the Istanbul International Jazz Festival. Brooks received the 2007 American Composers Forum Global Harmony Prize to create the score for Mirrors of Mumbai, a contemporary Indian jazz opera (book by Sonal Acharya) performed by Opera Piccola in Berkeley, California. In 2008, the American Composers Forum and the California Jazz Conservatory commissioned Brooks to compose and perform Double Moiré, featuring the poetry of and performance by beat poet Michael McClure. His compositions have been performed by Yo-Yo Ma, The Liverpool Philharmonic and have appeared in films by Merchant/Ivory Productions.

In 2009 Brooks was commissioned by the SF MOMA to create an "artist's response" to the museum's new Rooftop Sculpture Garden for which he composed Alphorn for Hans C. Siegmann. Brooks received a 2012 Met Life Creative Connections grant to present a workshop on Jazz and the Spoken Word with McClure and a 2012 New Music USA, Composer Assistance Program award to attend the premiere of his work for solo harp, The Alchemy of Happiness at the Gaudeamus Muziekweek. In 2013 Brooks received USArtists touring grant to appear with his group Summit at jazz festivals in Mumbai, Pune and Kolkata and a 2014 San Francisco Friends of Chamber Music commission to compose and present Ghalib a new work for saxophone, sarode and tabla. With his wife Emily Klion, Brooks has composed the scores for the SF Youth Theatre's production of Gary Soto's In and Out of Shadows and Marsh Youth Theater's production of Siddhartha, the Bright Path.

== Education career ==
Brooks has taught on the faculties of UC Santa Cruz, Mills College and the California Jazz Conservatory in Berkeley, California. He has led master classes at the California Institute of the Arts, LA Music Academy, McNally-Smith College of Music, Northern Illinois University, Clemson University, the Hong Kong Cultural Center, Swarnabhoomi Academy of Music and AR Rahman's KM Conservatory, in Chennai.

== Selected discography ==
- Lasting Impression (Moment 1996): George Brooks (saxophones), Krishna Bhatt (sitar), Zakir Hussain (tabla), John R. Burr (piano), David Belove (bass), David Rokeach (drums), Michael Spiro (percussion) and produced by [Mike Marshall.
- Night Spinner (Moment 1998): George Brooks (saxophones), Zakir Hussain (tabla), Jack Perla (piano), David Belove (bass), David Rokeach (drums), Aashish Khan (sarode), Sultan Khan (sarangi) Tommy Kesecker, (vibraphone), Molly Holm (vocals).
- Summit (Earth Brother, 2000): George Brooks (saxophones and piano), Steve Smith (drums), Kai Eckhardt (bass) Fareed Haque and Zakir Hussain (tabla) Niladri Kumar (sitar), Taufiq Qureshi (percussion).
- Spirit and Spice (Earth Brother, 2010): George Brooks (saxophones), Steve Smith (drums), Kai Eckhardt (bass), Fareed Haque (guitar), Zakir Hussain (tabla), Swapan Chaudhuri (tabla), Niladri Kumar (sitar), Kala Ramnath(violin), Ronu Majumdar (bansuri), Hamsika Iyer (vocals), Frank Martin (piano), Celso Alberti (percussion).
- Elements (Earth Brother, 2010): George Brooks (saxophones), Kala Ramnath (violin), Gwyneth Wentik (harp).
- Raga Bop Trio (Abstract Logix, 2010): George Brooks (saxophones), Steve Smith (drums), Prasanna(guitar).
- Music without Boundaries (Navras, 2001): George Brooks (saxophones), Hariprasad Chaurasia (bansuri), Larry Coryell (guitar), Swapan Chaudhuri (tabla), Vikku Vinayakram (ghatam).
- Kirwani Message of the Birds (DVD Navras, 2005): George Brooks (saxophones), Gwyneth Wentink (harp), Hariprasad Chaurasia (bansuri), Vijay Ghata (tabla)
