= Remember Shakti – Saturday Night in Bombay =

Live album by Remember Shakti
- Released: 19 June 2001
- Genre: World
- Length: 61:50
- Label: Verve
- Producer: John McLaughlin, Daniel Richard

Remember Shakti chronology
| The Believer (2000) | Remember Shakti – Saturday Night in Bombay (2001) | This Moment (2023) |

John McLaughlin chronology
| The Believer (2000) | Remember Shakti – Saturday Night in Bombay (2001) | Thieves and Poets (2003) |

Professional ratings
Review scores
| Source | Rating |
|---|---|
| Allmusic | 4/5 stars |
| All About Jazz | (favorable) |
| The Penguin Guide to Jazz Recordings | 3/4 stars |

Remember Shakti – Saturday Night in Bombay is a live album by the world fusion band Remember Shakti released in November 2001 on the Verve label. This concert features John McLaughlin on guitar, U. Srinivas on electric mandolin, Vikku Selvaganesh on ghatam, kanjira and mridangam, Zakir Hussain on tabla and a number of guest musicians, including vocalist Shankar Mahadeven, slide guitarist Debashish Bhattacharya and drummer Sivamani.

== Track listing ==
1. "Luki" (John McLaughlin) – 5:39
2. "Shringar" (Shivkumar Sharma) – 26:38
3. "Giriraj Sudha" (U. Srinivas) – 10:45
4. "Bell'alla" (Zakir Hussain) – 18:48

== Personnel ==
- U. Srinivas – electric mandolin
- Zakir Hussain – tabla
- John McLaughlin – guitar
- Vikku Selvaganesh – kanjira, ghatam, mridangam, percussions

Guest musicians

- Shankar Mahadeven - voice
- Debashish Bhattacharya – (Hindustani) slide guitar
- Bhavani Shankar – dholak
- Roshen Ali – dholak
- Aziz – dholak
- Taufiq Qureshi – def
- Shivkumar Sharma – santoor
- A.K. Pallanivel – tavil
- Sivamani – drums

Other credits

- Max Costa – engineer
- Sven Hoffman – engineer
- Lïla Guilloteau – assistant coordinator
