= Shakti (band) =

Jazz fusion band formed in 1973

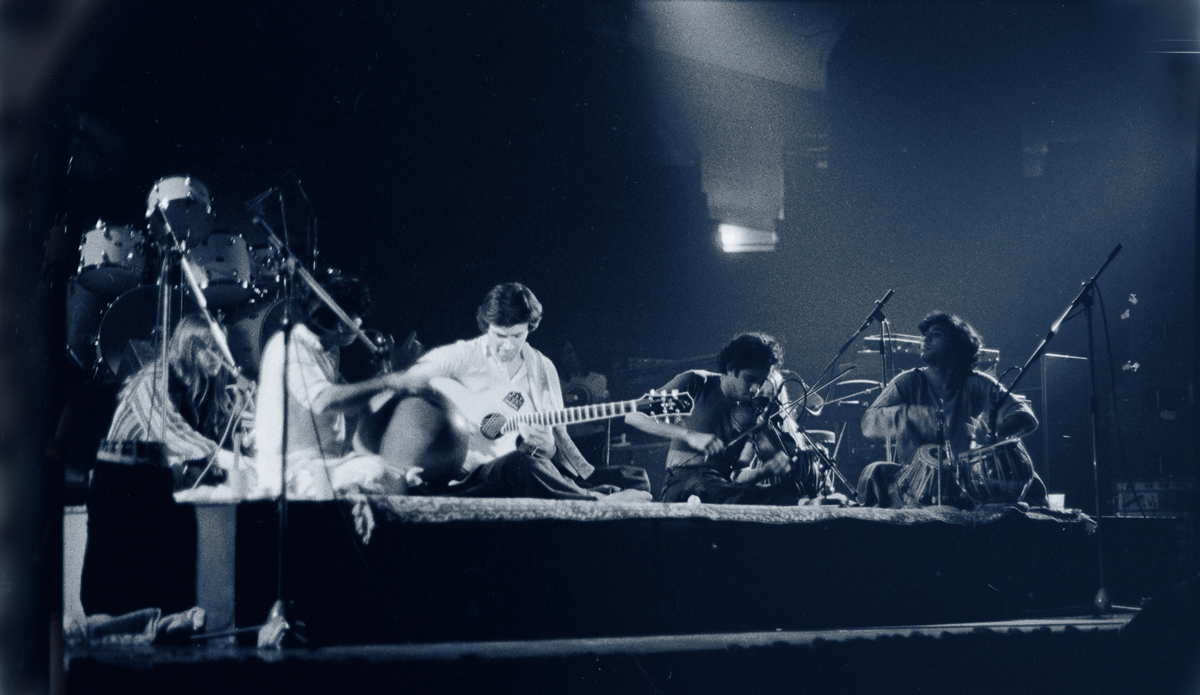
- Shakti in 1976

Background information
- Also known as: Turiyananda Sangit (in the early days)
- Genres: Jazz fusion; world
- Years active: 1973–1978; 2020–present
- Label: Columbia
- Spinoffs: Remember Shakti
- Members: John McLaughlin; Shankar Mahadevan; Ganesh Rajagopalan; V. Selvaganesh
- Past members: Zakir Hussain; L. Shankar; Ramnad Raghavan; Vikku Vinayakram; U. Srinivas

Shakti was a fusion band founded by English guitarist John McLaughlin and Indian violinist L. Shankar with percussionists Zakir Hussain (on tabla) and Vikku Vinayakram (on ghaṭam). Initially formed in 1973 under the name “Turiyananda Sangit” (a name coined by Sri Chinmoy that translates into English as “The pinnacle of delight in music”), with a lineup consisting of McLaughlin, L. Shankar, Ramnad V. Raghavan (on mridangam) and Mahālakṣmī Eve McLaughlin on Tanpura & Shruti box. Eve McLaughlin left the project, Zakir Hussain was added on tabla, and the group name changed to “Shakti” (meaning "creative intelligence, beauty, and power.") as the band wanted a name that “listeners in the West could relate to”. Raghavan also didn't stay with the project beyond the first album, and Vikku was added (on ghatam) for the remainder of Shakti’s early career. The group played acoustic fusion music which combined Carnatic music with elements of jazz.

"Shankar and McLaughlin were the pillars of Shakti, one of the decade's most innovative musical groups" — Charles Paikert, Cash Box Magazine, Dec 1979

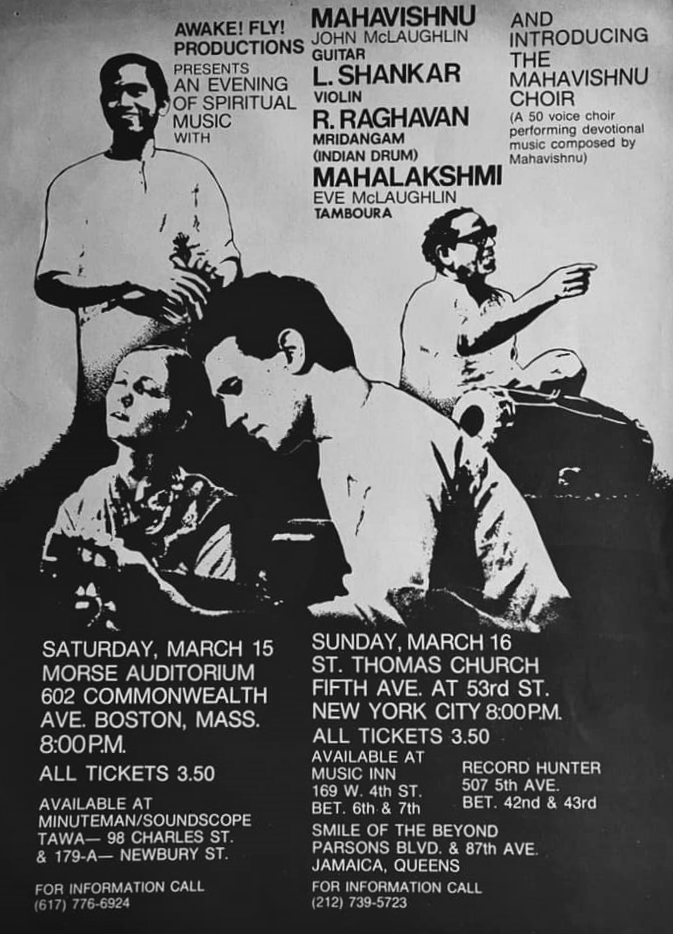
Turiyananda Sangit (1975) poster featuring John McLaughlin, L. Shankar & R.Raghavan.

In addition to fusing Western (Jazz, Celtic folk, Classical music) with Eastern music, Shakti also represented a fusion of the Hindustani and Carnatic music traditions, since Hussain was from Northern India while Shankar and Vikku are from the South.

The group came together after the dissolution of the first incarnation of the Mahavishnu Orchestra, and toured fairly extensively during the period 1975-1977. After 1977, the albums that Shankar recorded with Hussain and Vikku stayed close to the music they had popularized in Shakti.

Two concerts at the Montreux Jazz Festival (July 6, 1976 and July 8, 1977) are included among the 17 CDs of the box set Montreux Concerts by John McLaughlin.

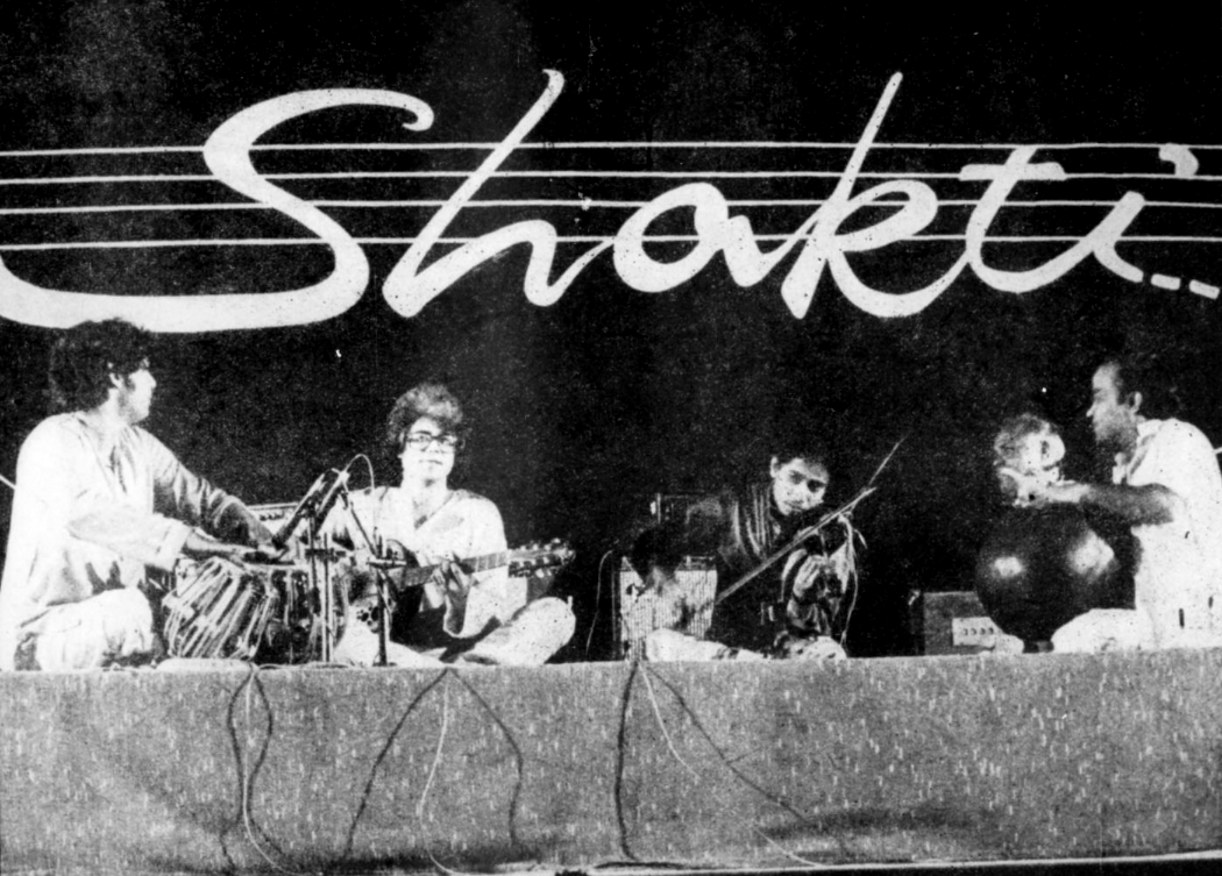
Shakti performing with Larry Coryell, standing in for John (who had injured his hand) at a concert in India in 1982

Between 1982 and 1984, Shakti regrouped for reunion tours in India, this time with L. Shankar performing on his double violin.

In 1997, McLaughlin and Hussain put together Remember Shakti, including V. Selvaganesh (son of T. H. "Vikku" Vinayakram ), electric mandolin player U. Shrinivas and eventually vocalist Shankar Mahadevan.

The band reformed in 2020, and released their first album as Shakti in 46 years, This Moment, on 23 June 2023. The album was supported by a world tour, including India, Europe, and the United States, under the name Shakti50. Violinist Ganesh Rajagopalan joined the band as a full-time member. The band also performed a live set for the Tiny Desk Concert.

In 2024, Shakti won the Grammy Award for the Best Global Music Album for the album This Moment. Shakti received two Grammy nominations for the album Mind Explosion [50th Anniversary Tour Live] in the Best Global Music Album category for the 2026 Grammy Awards.Following the release of Mind Explosion, McLaughlin announce that it would be Shakti's final album.

== Discography ==
List of Shakti albums, with selected details and chart positions
Title	Album details	Peak chart positions		
Title	Album details	US	US Jazz	SWE
Shakti with John McLaughlin	Released: 1976; Label: Columbia; Formats: LP, CD, digital download	194	37	—
A Handful of Beauty	Released: 1976; Label: Columbia; Formats: LP, CD, digital download	168	32	42
Natural Elements	Released: 1977; Label: CBS; Formats: LP, CD, digital download	—	—	—
This Moment	Released: 23 June 2023; Label: Abstract Logix; Formats: LP, CD, digital download	—	—	—
Mind Explosion (50th Anniversary Tour Live)	Released: 26 July 2025; Label: Abstract Logix; Formats: LP, CD, digital download	—	—	—
"—" denotes a recording that did not chart or was not released in that territory.
