= Shakti (Shakti album) =

Shakti with John McLaughlin

Live album by Shakti
- Released: 1976
- Recorded: July 5, 1975, at Southampton College, Long Island
- Genre: World fusion
- Length: 52:00
- Label: Columbia
- Producer: John McLaughlin

Shakti chronology
Shakti with John McLaughlin (1976)	A Handful of Beauty (1976)

John McLaughlin chronology
Inner Worlds (1976)	Shakti with John McLaughlin (1976)	A Handful of Beauty (1976)

Professional ratings
Review scores
Source	Rating
AllMusic	4/5 stars
The Penguin Guide to Jazz Recordings	3/4 stars
The Rolling Stone Jazz Record Guide	4/5 stars

Shakti with John McLaughlin is the first album by Shakti, described as "another brain blowing achievement" by Agha Yasir.

== Track listing ==
Side one

1. "Joy" (John McLaughlin/L. Shankar) – 18:13
2. "Lotus Feet" (McLaughlin) – 4:44

Side two

1. "What Need Have I for This–What Need Have I for That–I Am Dancing at the Feet of My Lord–All Is Bliss–All Is Bliss" (McLaughlin/Shankar) - 29:03

== Personnel ==
- John McLaughlin - Guitar
- L. Shankar - Violin
- Ramnad Raghavan - Mridangam
- T. H. Vinayakram - Ghatam and Mridangam
- Zakir Hussain - Tabla

=== Personnel - production (record) ===
- John McLaughlin - Producer
- Nathan Weiss - Manager
- Joseph D'Anna - Engineer
- Stan Tonkel - Engineer
- Apeksha Bacciagallupi
- Pranavanada - Photos
- Gregory diGiovine - CBS Records
- Danny Wong - Lettering
- Marie de Oro - Design

=== Personnel - production (CD) ===
- Mike Berniker - Producer, Coordination
- Larry Keyes - Digital Remastering
- Gary Pacheco - Coordination
- Penny Armstrong - Coordination
- Tony Tiller - Package Coordination
- Pete Cenedella - Package Coordination

== Charts ==
Chart (1976)	Peak position
US Top LPs & Tape (Billboard)	194
US Jazz Albums (Billboard)	37
