= This Moment (Shakti album) =

Studio album by Shakti
- Released: 23 June 2023
- Length: 57:00
- Label: Abstract Logix
- Producer: John McLaughlin

Shakti chronology
| Remember Shakti – Saturday Night in Bombay (2001) | This Moment (2023) |

This Moment is the third studio album by world fusion band Shakti. It is the first release under the Shakti name in 46 years, following the 1977 release of Natural Elements.

This Moment features founding member and guitarist John McLaughlin and longtime tabla player/percussionist Zakir Hussain alongside singer Shankar Mahadevan, violinist Ganesh Rajagopalan and percussionist Selvaganesh Vinayakram. This version of the group embarked on the first Shakti tour in 18 years in support of the record.

The album won the 2024 Grammy Award for Best Global Music Album.

== Background ==
Although John McLaughlin reformed Shakti as Remember Shakti in 1997 and continued to release albums into the early 2000s, This Moment is the first original recording under the Shakti name in 46 years. McLaughlin stated that "Shakti is very much a 'live' band", which means that recording a studio album together has been an issue due to the members living "on different continents". The album came about after McLaughlin called the members in 2021 and "persuad[ed] them to use today's recording technology to realise it".

== Critical reception ==
Professional ratings
Review scores
| Source | Rating |
|---|---|
| All About Jazz | 4.5/5 stars |
| AllMusic | 4/5 stars |

Thom Jurek of AllMusic wrote that "the sound is quite modern: acoustic guitars from the early albums have been replaced by organic-sounding electric guitars" and found that the album "recalls the original Shakti incarnation" due to the presence of violin. Jurek concluded that "the ensuing decades of individual and collective music experiences – as well as decades-old creative and personal connections between McLaughlin, Hussain, and Mahadevan – result in extraordinary musical communication that transcends traditions, concepts, and formal approaches, making Shakti a band for the ages". Ian Patterson of All About Jazz described the album as "splendid stuff", calling it "instantly recognisable as Shakti, yet with fresh sounds, as one might hope and expect from such a pioneering band—the band that, as many would have it, invented World Music before the term was born". Patterson remarked that there is no one highlight as "they unfold from first note to last, the players flowing in and out in a seamless choreography which is, by turns, joyous, thrilling and moving".

== Track listing ==
This Moment track listing
| No. | Title | Length |
|---|---|---|
| 1. | "Shrini's Dream" | 6:30 |
| 2. | "Bending the Rules" | 7:11 |
| 3. | "Karuna" | 8:33 |
| 4. | "Mohanam" | 6:01 |
| 5. | "Giriraj Sudha" | 10:38 |
| 6. | "Las Palmas" | 4:11 |
| 7. | "Changay Naino" | 6:08 |
| 8. | "Sono Mama" | 7:48 |
| Total length: | | 57:00 |

== Awards ==
This Moment (Shakti album) won the Grammy Award for Best Global Music Album in 2024.
