= Remember Shakti – The Believer =

Remember Shakti - The Believer

Live album by Remember Shakti
- Released: 3 October 2000
- Genre: World
- Length: 77:11
- Label: Verve
- Producer: John McLaughlin, Daniel Richard

Remember Shakti chronology
Remember Shakti (1999)	Remember Shakti - The Believer (2000)	Remember Shakti – Saturday Night in Bombay (2000)

Professional ratings
Review scores
Source	Rating
Allmusic	4/5 stars
All About Jazz	(very favorable)
The Penguin Guide to Jazz Recordings	3/4 stars

Remember Shakti – The Believer is a live album by the world fusion band Remember Shakti, that was released in 2000 on the Verve label. The live set features John McLaughlin on guitar, electric mandolinist U. Srinivas, Vikku Selvaganesh playing ghatam, and tabla player Zakir Hussain. The album peaked number 20 in the Billboard Top Jazz Albums chart.

== Track listing ==
1. "5 In The Morning, 6 In The Afternoon" (John McLaughlin) – 18:13
2. "Ma No Pa" (Zakir Hussain) – 14:56
3. "Lotus Feet" (McLaughlin) – 7:07
4. "Maya" (U. Srinivas) – 13:39
5. "Anna" (McLaughlin) – 10:36
6. "Finding The Way" (McLaughlin) – 12:40

== Personnel ==
- U. Srinivas – electric mandolin
- Zakir Hussain – tabla
- John McLaughlin – guitar
- Vikku Selvaganesh – ghatam

Other credits

- Max Costa – mastering, mixing
- Steve Hoffman – engineer
- Sven Hoffman – engineer, mixing assistant
- John Newcott – release coordinator
- Christian Pégand – production coordination
- Holger Schwark – engineer
- Freddy Zerbib – management

== Chart performance ==
Chart (2000)	Peak position
US Billboard Top Jazz Albums	20
