= U. Rajesh =

Indian composer and musician

- Also known as: U. Rajesh, Mandolin Rajesh
- Born: Uppalapu Rajesh; 17 May 1977 (age 49)
- Origin: Palakollu, Andhra Pradesh, India
- Genres: Indian classical music, jazz fusion, world music
- Occupations: Musician, music director
- Instrument: Electric mandolin
- Years active: 1983–present
- Member of: Srishti
- Relatives: U. Srinivas (brother)

Uppalapu Rajesh popularly known as Mandolin Rajesh is an Indian mandolin player of Carnatic classical music, a music producer, and a composer.

== Career ==
His work with John McLaughlin's album Floating Point, received a Grammy nomination in 2009. He was the youngest participant in the Magic Mandolin Festival, (Germany), has performed at the Lincoln Centre, New York City, and has given concerts in BBC Live at London, Melbourne Concert Hall, Cité de la Musique, Paris, Greece, Canada, Middle-East, United States, and Europe.

He has performed live with the Johannesburg Philharmonic Orchestra (with Dominique Di Piazza), KZN Philharmonic Orchestra, and Closer home (with Stephen Devassy). His music performance at New York in 2006, was voted among the best concerts of the year, by The New Yorker. He was specially honored by the President of India, in April 2007.

He has released solo albums, namely – Coromandel Duet (with A.K.Palanivel), Amalgamation, Vikku Vinayakaram, Spirits, Following My Heart and Into the Light. The musical album Samjanitha included himself, U. Srinivas, Zakir Hussain, Sivamani, and George Brook. U. Rajesh has been involved in tours and recordings with many music artists in both North and South India, such as Ustad Zakir Hussain, Ustad Sultan Khan, Pandit Hariprasad Chaurasia, Shankar Mahadevan, Hariharan, Louis Banks, Ranjit Barot, Mike Marshall, Sivamani and Pete Lockett, Karsh Kale and Greg Ellis, Bickram Ghosh, Kamal Sabri, Niladri Kumar etc. U. Rajesh in 2014, teamed with singer Karthik to form the band Srishti.

== Personal life ==
U. Rajesh was born on 17 May 1977 at Palakol, Andhra Pradesh, as the youngest child of U. Satyanarayana (father) and Kantham (mother). He is the younger brother of late U. Srinivas, a notable mandolin player in Carnatic classical music, in India.

In his childhood, his father and brother were his tutors in music. He started playing carnatic classical music on mandolin at the age of 6, and performed his first concert, at Kanchi Kamakoti Peetham in the presence of Shri. Chandrasekarendra Saraswathi. U. Rajesh is an ardent devotee of the Paramacharya of Kanchi. He is also a follower and devotee of Sri Sathya Sai Baba and has performed before him on several occasions.

He and his brother have performed in concerts together, and have released musical albums together. He is one of the directors of the music school, Srinivas Institute of World Music (SIOWM, named after U. Srinivas), Chennai, Tamil Nadu, which is providing free musical tuition to the students.

== Concerts ==
Starting at the age of 10, Rajesh started performing along with his brother. Rajesh was initiated to music by Kanchi Pamacharya and has given performances in over 50 countries. He continues to perform in carnatic classical and fusion music.

== Controversy ==
In 2018, as a part of what was widely considered as India's #MeToo movement, singer Chinmayi shared an account of a minor who was allegedly sexually harassed by Rajesh.
