= Floating Point =

Studio album by John McLaughlin
- Released: May 20, 2008
- Recorded: April 2007
- Studios: AM Studios, Chennai, India
- Genre: Jazz
- Length: 1:02:28
- Label: Abstract Logix
- Producer: John McLaughlin

John McLaughlin chronology
Industrial Zen (2006)	Floating Point (2008)	Five Peace Band Live (2009)

Floating Point is an album by John McLaughlin, released in 2008 through the record label Abstract Logix. The album reached number fourteen on Billboard's Top Jazz Albums chart.

Regarding the recording, McLaughlin commented: "while this CD features predominantly Indian musicians, we are in quite another form compared to the group Shakti... The music is for the most part 'Jazz-Fusion' if a label has to be put on it. But with the musicians involved in this project, it has also a 'world' kind of atmosphere." Concerning the album title, McLaughlin remarked: "Every now and then a group of musicians will gel together in such an incredible way, and at that point it's like you lose normal gravity... you've got your own gravity happening and you're kind of like floating with the other guys."

== Reception ==
Professional ratings
Review scores
Source	Rating
AllMusic	4/5 stars
DownBeat	5/5 stars
All About Jazz	4.5/5 stars
The Guardian	5/5 stars
Tom Hull	B+

Michael G. Nastos of AllMusic called the album "a surprisingly fine effort, ebbing and flowing from track to track, with McLaughlin's high-level musicianship shining through, same as it ever was."

In a 5-star review for DownBeat, Ken Micallef commented: "this brilliant collective plays as a single unit, not a band of hired studio guns... This is a case of Indian musicians using their extraordinary skills to explore U.S. fusion, giving the now 70-year-old guitarist an amazing platform for compositional/improvisational development. This is a landmark recording, marked by detail, subtlety and extraordinarily moving performances."

John Kelman in All About Jazz wrote "One of the most fluent, evocative and powerful albums in a career filled with high points," and concluded: "McLaughlin's Indian friends may not have jazz in their blood the way it is in the guitarist's, but by approaching unmistakably western-informed music with an eastern mindset, they make Floating Point an album that, in McLaughlin's lengthy discography, is one of his most successful fusion records".

Writing for The Guardian, John Fordham awarded the album 5 stars, and stated: "this boiling new set sounds as if it's driven at least as much by cutting-edge Indian crossover musicians as by McLaughlin himself... this is 99% an absolute cracker, and not just for guitar nuts either."

== Track listing ==
All tracks are written by John McLaughlin.

No.	Title	Length
1.	"AbbaJi (For Alla Rakha)"	9:01
2.	"Raju"	8:21
3.	"Maharina"	6:09
4.	"Off the One"	6:55
5.	"The Voice"	9:19
6.	"Inside Out"	8:30
7.	"14U"	7:07
8.	"Five Peace Band"	7:06
Total length:		1:02:28

== Personnel ==
- John McLaughlin – guitar synthesizer, guitar (2, 4, 6, 8)
- Hadrien Feraud – bass guitar
- Louis Banks – keyboards
- Ranjit Barot – drums
- Sivamani – percussion, konokol (6)
- George Brooks – soprano saxophone (1)
- Debashish Bhattacharya – Hindustani slide guitar (2)
- Shashank Subramanyam – bamboo flute (4)
- Shankar Mahadevan – voice (5)
- U. Rajesh – electric mandolin (6)
- Naveen Kumar – bamboo flute (7)
- Niladri Kumar – sitar (8)
