= Mysterium Tremendum =

Studio album by Mickey Hart Band
- Released: April 10, 2012
- Genre: World music
- Length: 74:00
- Label: 360° Productions
- Producer: Mickey Hart; Ben Yonas

Mickey Hart chronology
| Global Drum Project (2007) | Mysterium Tremendum (2012) | Superorganism (2013) |

Mysterium Tremendum is an album by the Mickey Hart Band, a musical group led by former Grateful Dead drummer Mickey Hart. It was released by 360° Productions on April 10, 2012.

Mysterium Tremendum was created by having the Mickey Hart Band, with guest percussionists and other musicians, play music along with what Hart has called "cosmic sounds". These sounds were created by taking light, radio waves, and other electromagnetic radiation given off by celestial objects such as the sun, planets, stars, and galaxies, and using computers to transform it into sound waves. Hart stated, "I have combined sonic images of the formation of our universe with sounds drawn from musical instruments. It's all about the vibrations that make up the infinite universe. In this case, they began as light waves and these light waves are still washing over us. Scientists at Penn State, Lawrence Berkeley Labs, and Meyer Sound have transformed these light waves into sound waves." Hart said that he worked with George Smoot, a scientist who, with John C. Mather, was awarded the Nobel Prize in Physics in 2006 for his work in cosmic microwave background radiation.

Seven of the twelve tracks on the album have lyrics written by Robert Hunter, who wrote the words for many Grateful Dead songs.

== Critical reception ==
In No Depression, Douglas Heselgrave said, "The music itself is fabulous, compelling and complex. It was during the Dead's 2009 tour, that Hart first became fascinated with sounds and images of the cosmos he'd accessed from NASA, and he began to incorporate some of them into the 'drums' segment of the show. This album is an extension of that interest with Hart using 'the billion year old orchestra of planetary motion' as a kind of reference or backbeat that grounds each of the songs on Mysterium Tremendum. If that sounds too far out, don't worry. Every composition on the album flows together to form a seamless journey that never loses its groove or momentum. The combination of cosmic sounds, electronic and hand percussions, and conventional rock instruments are interwoven to create a sonic ambiance that is completely contemporary and enveloping. But, those hoping for a New Age soundtrack will be sorely disappointed; this is hard and driving music blessed with a melodic sensibility that is far more front and center than we've heard from Mickey in some time."

In Relix, Justin Jacobs wrote, "... it's an instantly accessible album of jazz-inflected global grooves. The project, which is two years in the making, isn't so weird that it'll alienate beginners, but it's spaced-out enough to keep the 'heads happy and engaged. Hart sets most of these tunes, with lyrics co-written by Robert Hunter, on simmer but never on boil, making for a cool, calm and collected album. The sound of Hart's tight band, including Widespread Panic bassist Dave Schools, seems natural while bringing together disparate elements — dual vocalists Crystal Monee Hall and Trans-Siberian Orchestra alum Tim Hockenberry coo like they're in a smoky club while Hart's complex space-drums build like a Shpongle mind-warper."

Writing in the Ballard News-Tribune, Christy Wolyniak said, "The album consists of an epic, strange collaboration of sounds from the universe, so alienated and odd that one might feel they are experiencing a completely new world. Strange, jungle-like rhythms excite and arouse the soul to new meaning. Hart’s new album transforms music and infuses it with sounds selected from the universe. The marriage of vibrations and tones leaves one reflective and empowered.... The album is a positive mix of extraterrestrial sounds, world experiences, and deep, rhythmic vibrations..."

== Track listing ==
1. "Heartbeat of the Sun" (Mickey Hart, Ben Yonas, Crystal Monee Hall, Sikiru Adepoju, Giovanni Hidalgo, Zakir Hussain) – 4:50
2. "Slow Joe Rain" (Robert Hunter, Hart, Babatunde Olatunji, Andre Pessis, Yonas) – 4:54
3. "Cut the Deck" (Hunter, Hart, Cliff Goldmacher, Yonas) – 7:39
4. "Starlight Starbright" (Hunter, Hart, Pessis, Yonas) – 6:47
5. "Who Stole the Show?" (Hart, Adepoju, Pessis, Yonas, Tim Hockenberry, Steve Kimock, Dave Schools) – 3:52
6. "Djinn Djinn" (Hart, Goldmacher, Hall, Hockenberry, Hussain, Yonas) – 5:35
7. "This One Hour" (Hunter, Hart, Hall, Hockenberry, Yonas) – 8:16
8. "Supersonic Vision" (Hunter, Hart, Goldmacher, Hall, Yonas) – 7:07
9. "Time Never Ends" (Hart, Yonas, Hall, Hockenberry) – 6:49
10. "Let There Be Light" (Hunter, Hart, Pessis, Yonas, Hall, Hockenberry, Schools) – 4:12
11. "Ticket to Nowhere" (Hunter, Hart, Yonas, Hall, Hockenberry, Kimock) – 6:38
12. "Through Endless Skies" (Hart, Pessis, Yonas) – 7:22

== Personnel ==
=== Mickey Hart Band ===
- Mickey Hart – drums, percussion, vocals
- Sikiru Adepoju – talking drum, djembe, shakers
- Crystal Monee Hall – vocals, guitar, percussion
- Ian "Inkx" Herman – drum set
- Tim Hockenberry – vocals, keyboards, saxophone, trombone
- Gawain Mathews – guitar
- Dave Schools – bass
- Ben Yonas – keyboards

=== Additional musicians ===
- Chalo Eduardo – drums, percussion
- Greg Ellis – drums, percussion
- Giovanni Hidalgo – drums
- Robert Hunter – guitar
- Zakir Hussain – tabla
- Steve Kimock – guitar
- Reed Mathis – bass
- Vir McCoy – bass
- Babatunde Olatunji – drums
- Nick Phoenix – drums
- Jonah Sharp – drums
- T.H. "Vikku" Vinayakram – ghatam

=== Production ===
- Producers – Mickey Hart, Ben Yonas
- Associate producer – Howard Cohen
- Recording engineer – Ben Yonas
- Assistant engineers – Tom Flye, John Paul McLean, Chris Fletcher
- Mix engineers – Reto Peter, Dave Greenberg, Ben Yonas
- Additional production and digital processing – Jonah Sharp
- Additional digital processing – Charles Stella
- Additional recording engineer – Nick Phoenix
- Mastering – Dave Greenberg
- Musicology consultant – Fredric Lieberman
- Data sets – Keith Jackson, Perrin Meyer
- Sonification – Mark Ballora
- Cover art – Mark Henson
- Graphic design – CP Design
- Photograph – John Werner
