= Debashish Bhattacharya =

Indian classical musician, singer, composer (born 1963)

Pandit Debashish Bhattacharya
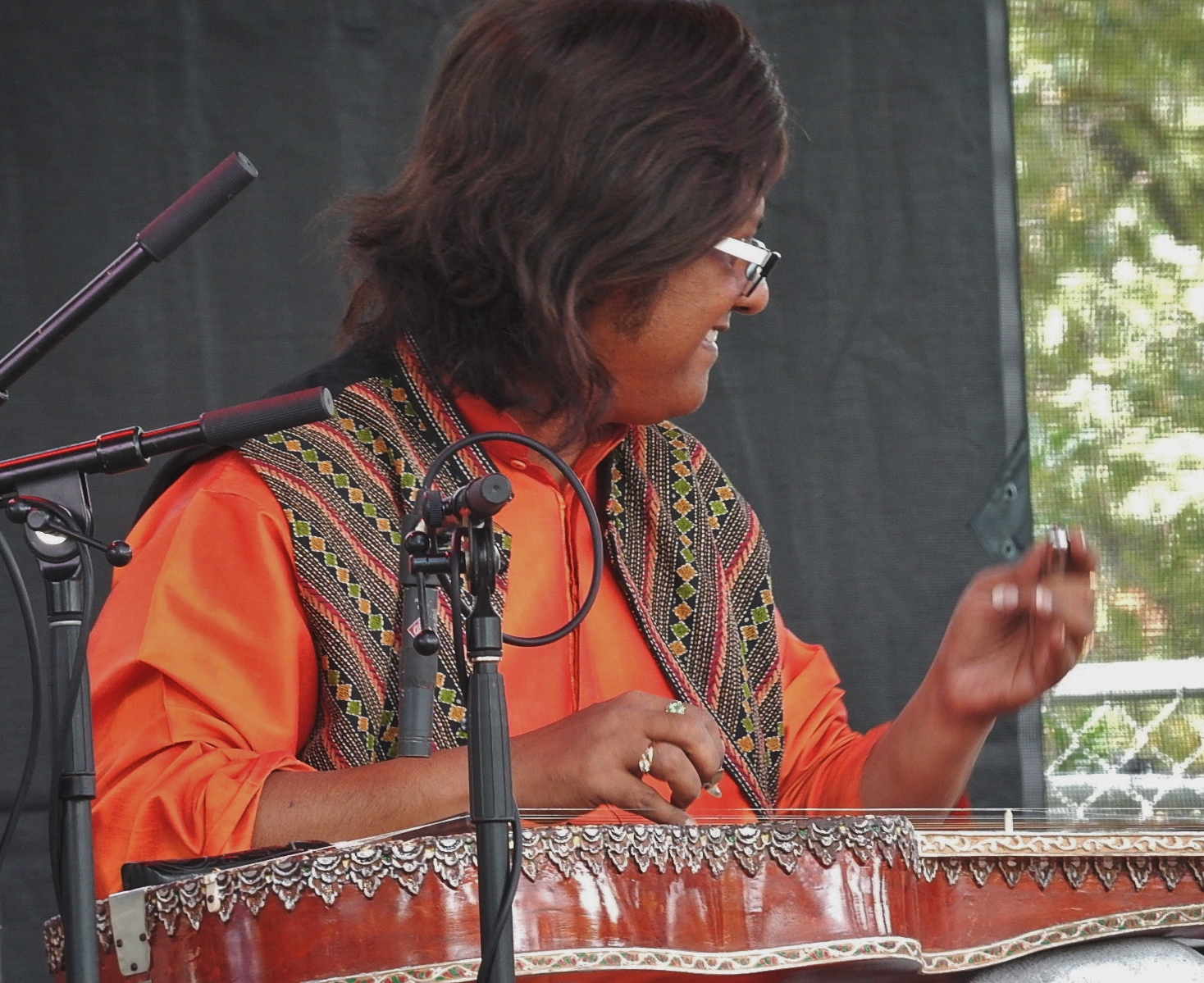

Background information
- Born: 12 January 1963 (age 63); Kolkata, West Bengal, India
- Genres: Hindustani classical music
- Occupation: slide guitarist
- Instrument: lap slide guitar
- Years active: 1975–present
- Website: www.debashishbhattacharya.com

Debashish Bhattacharya (Bengali: দেবাশীষ ভট্টাচার্য, Hindi: देवाशीष भट्टाचार्य, Devāśiṣ Bhaṭṭācārya, born 12 January 1963) is an Indian classical musician, singer, composer and educator. He is said to have introduced the first Slide Guitar Syllabus in the world. Bhattacharya redefined Indian classical music on slide guitar through the introduction of a new playing technique and sound, as well as a blending of traditional and uniquely contemporary approaches in designing his music. A music producer who plays lap slide guitar, he has taught more than a thousand students, created a new genre (Hindustani Slide Guitar), designed his own instruments (including the Chaturangui, Anandi and Gandharvi) and performed in more than two thousand concerts and workshops, with Grammy nominations and several world music awards. His latest guitar creation, the Pushpa Veena, is perhaps the first slide instrument in the world with a top made of animal skin. For Hindustani Raag music he has composed three new Raag, set to evening time: "Raag Palāsh Priyā," "Raag Shankar Dhwani" and "Raag Chandra Mālikā". Recipient of World Music Hall of Fame 2022. Grammy nominee 2009, BBC award 2007, Asiatic Society Gold Medal 2005 and President of India Gold medal 1984.

== Early life ==
Bhattacharya was born into a musical family in Kolkata, and his skill became apparent at a young age. His parents, both traditional Indian vocalists, gave him a basic understanding of music. He first began strumming a guitar when he was 3 years old, when his father gave him a full-size Hawaiian lap steel guitar. He made his debut at the age of 4, on All India Radio in Calcutta.

At age 15, he designed his first Chaturangui and created a genre called Hindustani Slide Guitar.

When he was 20, he was awarded the President of India Award for winning All India Radio's national music competition. At 21, he went to study for ten years under Indian slide-guitar pioneer Brij Bhushan Kabra.

His contemporary compositions began attracting the notice of musicians and music lovers. In 1993, he started performing extensively across the globe. During 2000–2001, he performed with the Remember Shakti band of John McLaughlin, alongside other members Zakir Hussain and U. Srinivas, and was featured on the live album from that tour: Remember Shakti – Saturday Night in Bombay. In 2001, he developed his second slide-guitar design, the 14-string Gandharvi. In 2002, he created a type of slide guitar called the Anandi, a blend of ukulele and mandolin named after his daughter.

== Career ==
Bhattacharya's originality as a musician has earned him global attention.

He invented his own slide guitars, unique to his compositions, which he calls the "Trinity of Guitars". These hollow-neck instruments are the 24-string Chaturangui; the 14-string Gandharvi; and the Anandi, a 4-string lap steel ukulele.

Bhattacharya opened a nonprofit School of Universal Music in Kolkata, where he estimates he has taught hundreds of students from all over the world the principal universal form of Indian Raga music and specialised guitar techniques.

Among his most popular albums are 2003's Mahima with Bob Brozman and 2005's 3: Calcutta Slide-Guitar, both of which are on Riverboat Records and ranked in the top 10 of the Billboard World Music Charts. He was nominated for a 2009 Grammy Award in the category of Best Traditional World Music Album for Calcutta Chronicles: Indian Slide Guitar Odyssey. His other albums worth mentioning are Young Master Music Today 1992, Hindustani Slide Guitar album 1993–1997 three albums from India Archive Music Records.

Hindustani Slide Guitar Vestapole Video 1994.

Madeira – If Music can intoxicate 2013.

Bhattacharya recorded his first Global Fusion album in 2012, Beyond the Ragasphere, featuring John McLaughlin, Jerry Douglas, and his daughter Anandi Bhattacharya. In 2015. He released Slide Guitar Ragas From Dusk Till Dawn.

His hybrid Indian-Hawaiian music album, Hawaii to Calcutta: A Tribute to Tau Moe, was chosen as one of the ten best albums in 2017 by Songlines magazine.

In 2018 he produced his daughter Anandi's first music album, Anandi Joys Abound. Also in 2018, he released Joy! Guru, an improvisational collaboration with Polish jazz musicians Hubert Zemler (drums) and Wojtek Traczyk (double-bass) recorded during a single all-night session.

In 2019, he released Pushpa Veena.

In 2021, Bhattacharya contributed to the Outlaw Ocean Music Project, in which musicians are invited to create works inspired by the book The Outlaw Ocean; his album is called Tormented Souls at Sea.

2016–2021 Bhattacharya has written the first ever syllabus on Slide Guitar.

2022 TransGlobal World Music Chart valued Bhattacharya's artistic and musical contributions for Hall of Fame of world music. A Lifetime achievement award.

2023 January Debashish has released his new album The Sound of the Soul from John McLaughlin's label Abstractlogix
