= Ranjit Barot =

Indian musical artist (born 1959)

- Born: Mumbai, Maharashtra, India
- Occupation: Music composer
- Years active: 1980–present
- Spouse: Maya

Ranjit Barot is an Indian film score composer, music director, arranger, drummer, and singer. He is a longtime associate of A. R. Rahman.

John McLaughlin has described him as one of the "leading edges" in drumming.

== Early life and background ==
Barot was born on January 1, 1959, into a family of Indian musicians and dancers. His mother, Sitara Devi, was a celebrated Kathak dancer from Varanasi. and his father was from Gujarat.

== Career ==
Barot's music career began in the 1980s. His drumming style has been influenced by artists across various genres and traditions, including Indian classical percussionists such as Ustad Alla Rakha, Ustad Zakir Hussain, Palghat Raghu (mridangam), Karaikudi Mani (mridangam), Palanivel (tavil), Hari Shankar (khanjira), and Sridhar Parthasarathy (mridangam, hand percussion). Other influences include jazz and fusion legends like Billy Cobham, Tony Williams, Elvin Jones, Steve Gadd, Omar Hakim, Al Foster, and Peter Erskine. He also drew inspiration from global drumming traditions, such as the African Djembe, Japanese Taiko, Middle Eastern Darbuka, and Latin Conga and Bongo styles, as well as contemporary percussionists and female artists, including Sheila E., Terri Lyne Carrington, and Evelyn Glennie.

He has worked as a drummer, arranger, and producer for composers and artists such as R. D. Burman, Laxmikant–Pyarelal, Kalyanji–Anandji, U. Srinivas, L. Subramaniam, Anu Malik and Ismail Darbar. His collaborations with musicians abroad include performances with artists such as John McLaughlin, Jonas Hellborg, Aydin Esen, and Tim Garland. He was featured as the drummer on McLaughlin's Grammy-nominated album Floating Point. Bruce Swedien influenced Barot's musical style and approach to contemporary work, mixing Barot's songs on Vande Mataram 2 and Senso Unico, an Indo-Italian feature film. He works out of a studio in Mumbai.

At the Jazz Yatra '80, he performed with the Jazz Yatra Sextet and Pandit Ravi Shankar's ensemble, Jazzmine, featuring John Handy, George Adams, and Mike Richmond of the Mingus Dynasty.

During the Jazz Sextet's first European tour, Barot met and befriended Don Cherry, which led to a joint performance at the 1982 Jazz Yatra in Bombay.

In November 2010, Barot released his debut album, Bada Boom, a collection of his Jazz Fusion and World compositions, featuring performances by Ustad Zakir Hussain, John McLaughlin, U. Srinivas, U. Rajesh, Scott Kinsey, Matt Garrison, Wayne Krantz, Dominique Di Piazza, Harmeet Manseta, Taufiq Qureshi, Sanjay Divecha, Tim Garland, Gwilym Simcock, Ayden Esen and Elie Afif, among others. Barot was the music composer and sound designer for the opening and closing ceremonies of the Commonwealth Games Delhi 2010. He represented India in his live performance at the "India Inclusive" showcase at WEF, Davos 2011. He played for the opening of the Hockey World Cup in 2019 and was the music producer for Jammin (Season 2) and MTV Unplugged's (Season 1 & 2). He also leads the band AR Rahman Live.

In 2001, he won the Filmfare Award for Best Background Score for Aks. In 2011, he won three major Indian music awards for his work in Shaitan.

== Personal life ==
Barot has a daughter, Mallika, who is a vocalist.

== Discography ==
=== As music director ===
Year	! Film	Language	Notes
1989	Raakh	Hindi	
1995	Oh Darling Yeh Hai India	Hindi	
1997	V.I.P.	Tamil	
2000	Fiza	Hindi	
2002	Hathyar	Hindi	
2003	Qayamat: City Under Threat	Hindi	
2003	Mumbai Se Aaya Mera Dost	Hindi	
2003	Chupke Se	Hindi	
2006	Holiday	Hindi	
2007	Urchagam	Tamil	
2007	Kanna	Tamil	
2009	Sankat City	Hindi	
2009	Acid Factory	Hindi	
2010	Thanks Maa	Hindi	
2010	Muskurake Dekh Zara	Hindi	
2011	Shaitan	Hindi	

=== As background music composer ===
- Tera Jadoo Chal Gayaa (2000)
- Aks (2001)
- Om Jai Jagadish (2002)
- Rishtey (2002)
- Main Hoon Na (2004)
- Dus (2005)
- Tathastu (2006)
- Aryan – Unbreakable (2006)
- Cash (2007)
- Chhodon Naa Yaar (2007)
- Bhool Bhulaiyaa (2007)
- Black & White (2008)
- Tashan (2008)
- Mere Baap Pehle Aap (2008)
- Toss (2009)
- Yeh Mera India (2009)

=== As sound designer ===
- Tera Jadoo Chal Gayaa (2000)

=== As a playback singer ===
- Muskurake Dekh Zara (2010)
- Acid Factory (2009)
- Sankat City (2009)
- Ru Ba Ru (2008)
- V.I.P (Tamil) (1997)
- Aryan – Unbreakable (2006)
- Baabul (2006)
- Pyare Mohan (2006)
- Holiday (2006)
- Dus (2005)
- Main Hoon Na (2004)
- Chupke Se (2003)
- Shaitan (2011)
- Oh Darling! Yeh Hai India! (1995)

=== As an instrumentalist ===
- Thug Life - credited for drums, additional rhythm

== Filmography ==
=== As an actor ===
- 99 Songs (2019)
