= Floating point (disambiguation) =

Floating point is a method of representing a real number as an integer multiplied by a power of some number (typically 10).

"Floating point" may also refer to:

- Floating Point, a jazz music album by John McLaughlin
- Floating Points, a British electronic music DJ and producer
- Floating Point Systems, an Oregon-based minisupercomputer vendor
