= Machete Ensemble =

San Francisco Latin jazz band (1985–2006)

The Machete Ensemble was a Latin jazz band whose 21-year organization ended with its final concert on November 12, 2006, when it closed the 2006 San Francisco Jazz Festival. KQED News reported that "it seemed like everyone who was ever part of the San Francisco Latin jazz scene was on hand to bid adios to John Santos' Machete Ensemble."

Its main personnel were San Francisco Bay Area musicians John Santos, director, congas, percussion, composer; Orestes Vilató, timbales, bongos; John Calloway, flute, composer/arranger; Wayne Wallace, trombone, composer/arranger; Melecio Magdaluyo, saxophone, clarinet, flute; Ron Stallings, saxophone, clarinet; David Belove, bass; Paul Van Wageningen, drumset; Murray Low, piano; Orlando Torriente, vocals, percussion.
