= Taufiq Qureshi =

Indian classical musician (born 1962)

Ustad Taufiq Qureshi
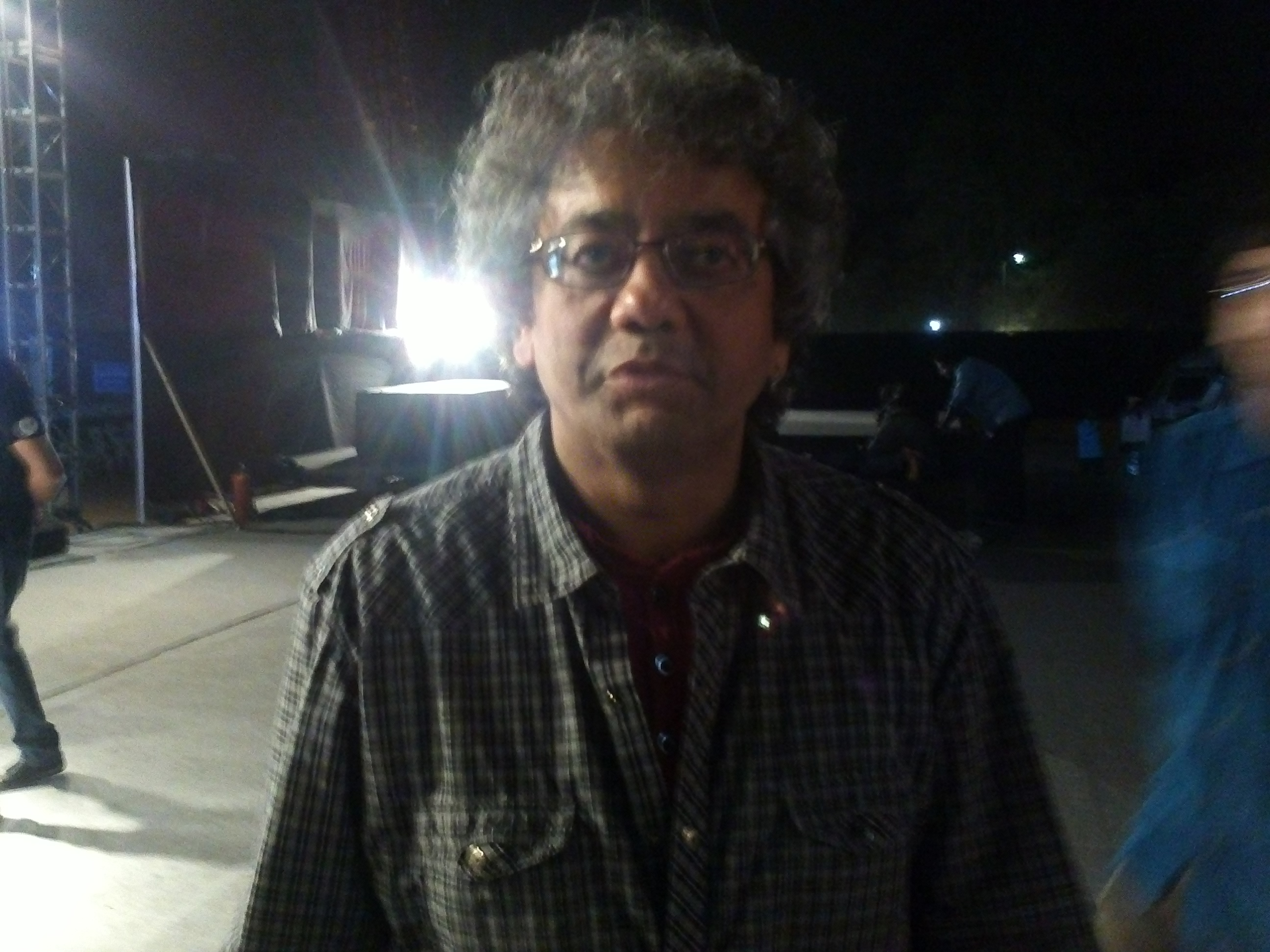
- Qureshi at Dumru The drum festival. In Dec, 2012.

Background information
- Born: Taufiq Qureshi; 1962 (age 63–64)
- Genres: Indian classical music, Fusion
- Occupations: Tabla player in the family tradition: Ustad Alla Rakha (father); Zakir Hussain (brother); Fazal Qureshi(brother)
- Instruments: Djembe, Percussions, Vocal percussion
- Years active: 1989 – present
- Website: Official website

Ustad Taufiq Qureshi (born 1962) is an Indian classical musician. He is a percussionist and composer.

== Early life ==
Born in Mumbai to the tabla player Alla Rakha. His eldest brother was a legendary tabla player, Zakir Hussain. He received guidance from Ghatam Vidhwan, Pandit Vikku Vinayakram.

== Career ==
Qureshi started his career when he was still in his 20s. His stint with live performances began with the creation of his own world music band, ‘Surya’, way back in 1986-87. He has been featured as a performing artiste on the 2009 Grammy Award-winning album Global Drum Project, Remember Shakti, Masters of Percussion and Summit. He collaborates with various classical artists for fusion concerts.

Qureshi has garnered critical praise for his work, he has become a relevant rhythm-programmer, arranger-composer and percussionist in the world of studio recordings (film background scores, TV serials, ad-jingles, albums, etc.).

He plays a variety of percussion instruments like djembe, duff, bongos, and batajon. He is the first artist to have developed a unique rhythmic language to adapt the tabla syllables on the African drum called Djembe.

Qureshi’s trademark style incorporates body and vocal percussions to create unique rhythmic motifs spanning across cultures.

Recently Qureshi has been honored by Sandeep Marwah with the life membership of the International Film And Television Club of Asian Academy of Film & Television at Marwah Studio, Noida Film City. He has been teaching students for over a decade.

== Awards and recognition ==
- Gold at the Cannes film festival (2010–11) for Best Music for the Indian Railways jingle.
- Gold at the London International Awards - Las Vegas (Nov 2013) for Original Music for the Nike jingle - Parallel Journey.

=== Bollywood ===
He has also been a part of background score and contributed music for movies like Damini, Train To Pakistan, Ghatak, Agnivarsha, Asoka, Mission Kashmir, Black, Dil Chahta Hai, Devdaas, Sawariya, Dhoom 2, Bhool Bhulaiya, Parzania (2007), Tere Naam (2008), Jab We Met (2010–11), Action Replay (2010–11), Housefull 2 (2011), Tez (2012), ABCD (AnyBody Can Dance) (2013), Bhaag Milkha Bhaag (2013). Fluent in Marathi, Taufiq has been a judge on Zee Marathi's Sa Re Ga Ma Pa.

== Personal life ==
Qureshi is married to Geetika Varde, a vocalist of the Jaipur-Atrauli gharana. He has one son, Shikhar Naad Qureshi, who studied at St. Xavier's College, Mumbai. Shikhar is also a rhythm player. He performs on stage as well.

== Discography ==
- Rhydhun (2000)
- Swar Utsav - Streams In Confluence (2001)
- Rhydhun Gold (2002)
- Mondo Beat - Masters of Percussion
- India The Greatest Songs Ever
- Taalisma (2002)
- Colours of Rajasthan (1995)
- PercJam (2003)
- Bombay Fever (2006)
- Mystic Soundscapes - Forest (2007)
- Rooh - Songs From The Heart (2007)
- TaDhaa- An Expression Of High Energy (2011)
- The Oath Of Vaayuputras (2013)
- Aami [2018] Malayalam film
