= B. C. Manjunath =

Indian percussionist (born 1976)

B Chandramouli Manjunath (known as B C Manjunath) (born in 1976 in Karnataka) is an Indian Mridangam player, active in Indian classical music as well as Jazz and World music genres. He is also known as a practitioner and proponent of Konnakol, including via online videos exploring mathematical structures through the practice, including the Fibonacci Tala.

Born into a musical family, Manjunath’s father was the veteran mridangam artist Dr BK Chandramouli and he learnt the mridangam from Vidwan KN Krishnamurthy. His paternal grandmother is also a vocalist Vidushi A. Rajamma Keshavamurthy..
