= Manpoondia Pillai =

Indian carnatic musician

Manpoondia Pillai also spelt as Maanpoondiya Pillai (1859 – 1922) was an Indian carnatic musician who was renowned for playing kanjira (also known as ganjira) instrument. Manpoondia Pillai is acknowledged and credited for the emergence of Kanjira in South Indian Carnatic music, as well as for being the pioneer in the development of the modern form of the instrument. Maanpoondiya Pillai founded the traditional dominant school of percussion in the form of Pudukottai tradition in Carnatic music during the 19th century.

== Career ==
He initially worked as a temple lantern-bearer in the Pudukottai Palace. He was offered an invitation to listen to music concerts, as he was mostly seen standing in a corner holding the lantern during music kacheris. According to sources and eyewitnesses, he was persuaded by someone in the crowd to learn the basics of music and become a music genius. The spark came to him when Manpoondia Pillai had appreciated the singers duo Nannu Mian and Chote Mian in awe of their performance to the drumming of dholak instrument.

Captivated by musical interest, he then eventually approached percussion instrumentalist Tirugokarnam Mariappa Pillai (also known as Mariappa Thavil kaarar), who was a well known Thavil vidvan during that time. Manpoondia was intended to become a student of Mariappa Thavil kaarar, but the latter initially hesitated to accept Manpoondia as his student considering the fact that Manpoondia hailed from an unorthodox background. However, Mariappa Tavil kaarar changed his mind after Manpoondia Pillai had proven him wrong with his ability to play percussion instruments. Soon his guru, Mariappa Thavil kaarar had convinced him to come up with his own creative way of designing an instrument that could be played with one hand. Following his guru's advice, Manpoondia Pillai had modified the kanjira to a frame drum with a single pair of jingles and brought the instrument to a classical stage. The kanjira he originally made had measured upto approximately 6.5 to 7 inches width. To produce some unique sound variation to kanjira, Manpoondia Pillai used the skin of a monitor lizard. The Kanjira instrument had turned out to be a serendipitous discovery in Carnatic music, as the idea was born, albeit a dissent shown by Mariappa Tavil kaarar who had addressed Manpoondia Pillai with insulting remarks, while mocking Manpoondia about his lack of knowledge in music.

He also decided to meet Narayanaswamy Appa, a mridangam vidwan in Thanjavur with the aim of getting recognition for his new kanjira instrument. He had also established the Pudukottai School of playing percussion instruments and taught students to play kanjira. Some of his students who excelled under his guidance include the likes of Pudukottai Dakshinamurthy Pillai and Palani Muttiah Pillai. Veteran Biographer Lalitha Ram in his biography titled Dhuruva Natchathiram, acknowledged that at one point in time, both Maanpoondiya Pillai and Pudukottai Dakshinamurthy Pillai had overshadowed the traditional mridangam players in the concerts across Tamil Nadu as the duo performed in concert platforms playing the kanjira instrument.
