= Geetika Varde =

Indian singer

Geetika Varde Qureshi is an Indian classical vocalist of the Jaipur-Atrauli gharana of Hindustani classical music and wife of percussionist Taufiq Qureshi.

She holds a graded artist classification from All India Radio and has received the Surmani title from Sur Shringar Samsad. Her performances have spanned multiple genres and have taken place in India and internationally, including at the Trafalgar Square Festival in 2006.

== Early life and background ==
Born to Mohini and Mohan Varde, she was brought up in the Shivaji Park area in Mumbai, along with her elder sister Laxmi. She studied at St. Xavier's College, Mumbai, where she met Taufiq Qureshi, whom she was to wed later.

She received vocal training from Manik Bhide, a noted vocalist of the Jaipur-Atrauli gharana, and also received a scholarship from ITC Sangeet Research Academy, Kolkata.

== Career ==
Geetika Varde, although a trained professional classical singer of the Jaipur Gharana, is very inclined towards light-classical forms and composing. Having performed at classical and fusion concerts, she has conducted lecture-demonstrations and workshops at prestigious venues in India and abroad. For the release of her well appreciated solo album ‘ROOH’, Pandit Shivkumar Sharma referred to the couple as "Taufiq and Geetika are a perfect blend of rhythm and melody."

== Personal life ==
Geetika Varde is married to Taufiq Qureshi and the couple have a son, Shikhar Naad. Though still studying, he learns tabla from his father and has performed at certain public concerts with him.

== Discography ==
.Geetika Varde has released one album, titled Rooh - Songs From The Heart, released in 2007.

No.	Title	Length
1.	"Najariya"	6:15
2.	"Yeh Dil"	6:57
3.	"Hey Manaa"	7:33
4.	"Hum Aapne"	6:06
5.	"Shyaam"	6:34
6.	"Meera"	4:00
7.	"Tum Bin"	7:11
8.	"Ley Ailey"	6:49
9.	"Gajaraaj"	5:32
Total length:		56:55
