= Crystal Monee Hall =

American singer-songwriter

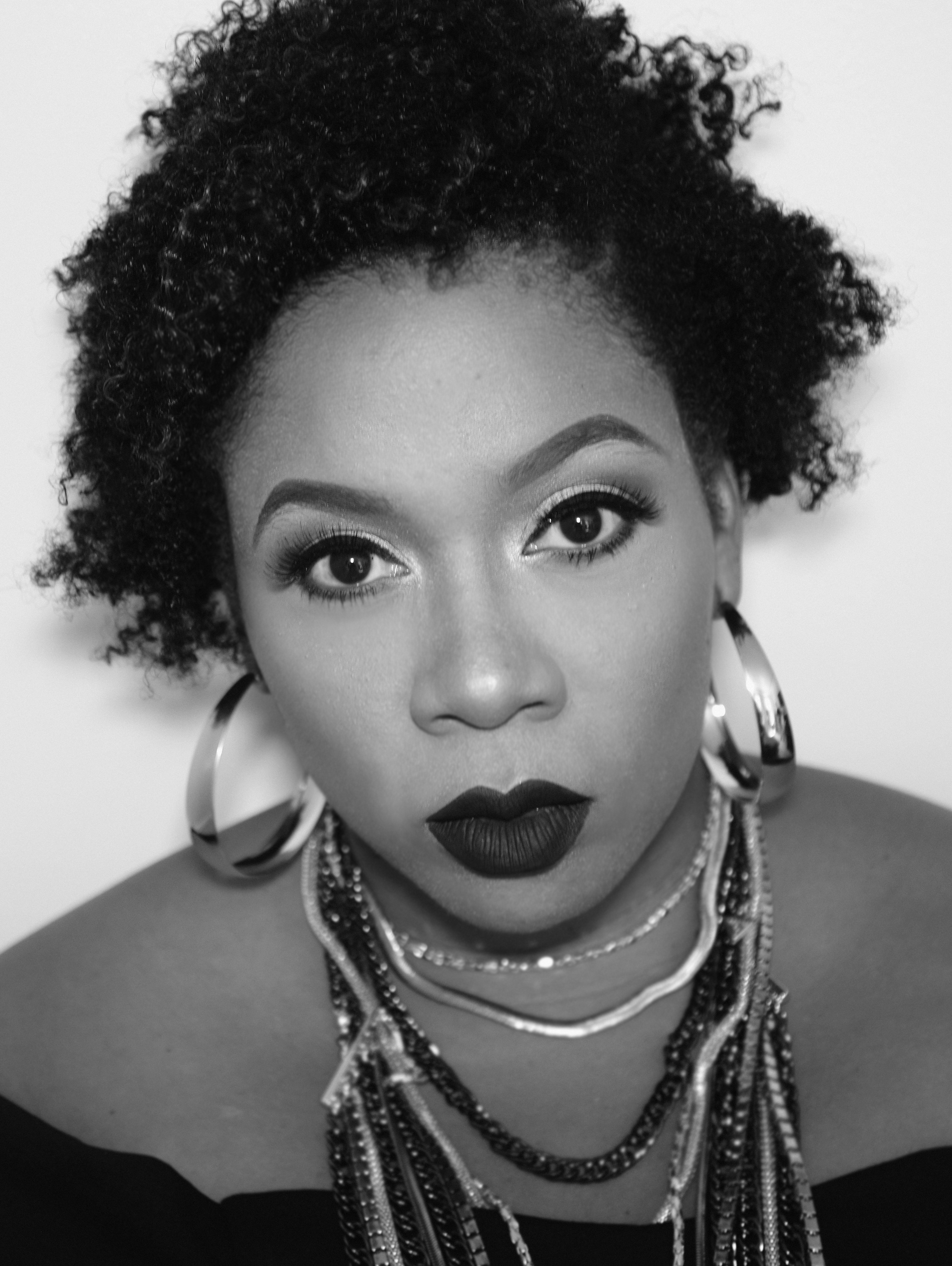
- Born: Richmond, Virginia, U.S.
- Education: University of Virginia (SEHD)
- Occupations: Stage actress singer songwriter music producer
- Years active: 1995–present
- Website: crystalmoneehall.com

Crystal Monee Hall is an American actress, singer-songwriter and multi-instrumentalist. She rose in fame for her roles in the Tony Award-winning musical Rent. She has published independent music projects and collaborated with Mickey Hart Band. After being cast in several television series, in 2023 she starred on Alicia Keys' jukebox musical Hell's Kitchen.

== Career ==
Born and raised in Richmond, Virginia, Hall holds a master's degree in Education from the University of Virginia's School of Education and Human Development (formerly the Curry School of Education) as well as undergraduate degrees in English and African American Studies.

She began her career with the Tony Award-winning musical Rent, playing numerous roles in the Broadway and National Touring companies.

In 2010 Hall independently released her debut album, River Train, garnering the attention of Grateful Dead drummer Mickey Hart. In 2011 Hall joined the newly reformed all-star Mickey Hart Band. She contributed songwriting and vocals to both of the band's albums, Mysterium Tremendum (2012) and Superorganism (2013).

Hall has provided supporting vocals for Elton John, Mariah Carey, Jason Mraz, India Arie, Ledisi and Ben Platt.

She is currently an adjunct professor of music at the NYU Tisch School of the Arts while she puts the finishing touches on her third solo project.

Hall appeared on Saturday Night Live alongside country singer Thomas Rhett on March 2, 2019. Her standout feature in the performance garnered the attention of Rolling Stone magazine, which noted her "soulful and superb talent".

In 2021 she recorded an original song entitled "Magic" alongside Ayodele Casel for the Joyce Theater's presentation of Ayodele Casel: Chasing Magic. In 2023 Hall was cast in Alicia Keys' Off-Broadway jukebox musical Hell's Kitchen.

== Discography ==
=== Studio albums ===
==== Solo ====
- River Train (2010)

==== With Mickey Hart Band ====
- Mysterium Tremendum (2012)
- Superorganism (2013)

=== EPs ===
- If You Breathe (2017)

=== Soundtracks and musical recordings ===
- 2021: "Magic" on Ayodele Casel: Chasing Magic with Ayodele Casel

== Theater ==
Year	Production	Role	Venue	Dates	Notes
1996	Rent	Ensemble	Nederlander Theatre, New York		Broadway production
1996–2008	Rent	Ensemble	North American Tour		Several replecing of the role of Joanne Jefferson
2023	Hell's Kitchen	Crystal	The Public Theater, New York	Nov 9, 2023 – Jan 14, 2024	Off-Broadway production
2025	Dear Everything	Ensemble	U.S. National Tour	Mar. 10, 2025 – Oct. 3, 2025	U.S. National Tour

== Television ==
Year	Production	Role	Notes
2018–2020	High Maintenance	Mo	2 episodes
2019	Russian Doll		Episode: "Alan's Routine"
2019	Live from Lincoln Center	Performer	With Cynthia Erivo
2021	Walker	Minnie Jayne	Episode: "Encore"
2022	Cars on the Road	Truck (voice)	Episode: "Trucks"
