= Superorganism (Mickey Hart Band album) =

Studio album by the Mickey Hart Band
- Released: August 13, 2013
- Genre: World music
- Length: 60:30
- Label: 360° Productions
- Producers: Mickey Hart; Ben Yonas

Mickey Hart chronology
Mysterium Tremendum (2012)	Superorganism (2013)	RAMU (2017)

Superorganism is an album by the Mickey Hart Band, a musical group led by former Grateful Dead drummer Mickey Hart. It was released by 360° Productions on August 13, 2013.

On Superorganism, musicians singing and playing instruments such as guitar, bass, keyboards, and various drums combined their music with sounds created using Hart's own brain waves. The brain wave sounds were created by using computers to change electrical impulses from an EEG cap into audible frequencies.

The lyrics for four of the songs were written by Robert Hunter, who wrote the words for many Grateful Dead songs.

In the album liner notes, Hart wrote, "A superorganism is a complex organism composed of many smaller organisms.... A band is a superorganism, so is the universe. For the last few years I have been creating music from the source sounds of the cosmos and now the body. These sounds are noise — harsh, strange — and it is only after dancing with their essence face to face that music can be created."

== Track listing ==
1. "Falling Stars" (Mickey Hart, Ben Yonas, Crystal Monee Hall, Dave Schools, Robert Hunter) – 6:01
2. "The Sermon" (Hart, Yonas, Schools, Andre Pessis, Hunter) – 4:42
3. "Chabadas" (Hart, Yonas, Hall, Schools, Pessis, Zakir Hussain, Hunter) – 6:16
4. "Don't Let Your God Down" (Hart, Yonas, Hall, Pessis, Cliff Goldmacher, Giovanni Hidalgo, Hussain, Reya Hart) – 6:14
5. "I Want It Back" (Hart, Yonas, Pessis, Hidalgo, Hussain) – 8:15
6. "Aliromba O Saro" (Hart, Yonas, Jonah Sharp, Pessis, Hussain, Hunter) – 5:55
7. "Rage On" (Hart, Yonas, Hall, Schools, Hidalgo) – 5:44
8. "Mind Your Head" (Hart, Yonas, Hall, Sharp, Sikiru Adepoju, Hidalgo, Hussain) – 5:57
9. "Bully Boy" (Hart, Yonas, Hall, Schools, Hidalgo) – 4:38
10. "Ghost Rider" (Hart, Yonas, Hall, Sharp, Adepoju, Hidalgo) – 6:48

== Personnel ==
=== Musicians ===
- Mickey Hart – drums, percussion, vocals, brain waves
- Sikiru Adepoju – percussion
- Joe Bagale – guitar, keyboards, vocals
- Crystal Monee Hall – vocals
- Ian "Inkx" Herman – drums
- Giovanni Hidalgo – percussion
- Zakir Hussain – percussion
- Chris Kelley – vocals
- Steve Kimock – guitar
- Gawain Mathews – guitar
- Reed Mathis – bass
- Dave Schools – bass
- Jonah Sharp – keyboards
- Greg Shutte – drums
- Adam Theis – bass
- African Showboyz – additional percussion

=== Production ===
- Produced by Mickey Hart, Ben Yonas
- Recording engineer: Ben Yonas
- Assistant engineers: Alex McGraw, Noa Yonas
- Additional engineering: John Paul McClean
- Mastering: Brad Blackwood
- Musicology consultant: Fredric Lieberman
- Graphic design: Malea Clark-Nicholson
- Lettering: Roxanne Smith
- Photography: John Werner
