= S. Ramanathan (musician) =

Indian musician (1917–1988)

- Born: 1917
- Died: 1988 (aged 70–71)
- Occupations: Carnatic music singer, musicologist
- Known for: Sangeetha Kalanidhi (1985)
- Awards: Sangeetha Kalanidhi (1985); Sangeet Natak Akademi Fellowship (1986)

S. Ramanathan (1917–1988) was a Carnatic music singer and musicologist from India. He was awarded the Sangeetha Kalanidhi title in 1985 by Madras Music Academy, and the Sangeet Natak Akademi Fellowship in 1986, the highest award of Sangeet Natak Akademi.

He learned music from Tiger Varadachariar, Sabesa Iyer, Ponniah Pillai, and Sathur Krishna Iyengar. After this, he also trained under Vidwan Valadi Krishnaiyer, known as "Kirthana Kutir" (Granary of Kirthanas for vocal music and Devakottai Narayana Iyengar for the veena and acquired proficiency in both fields.

He received a Ph.D. in ethnomusicology from Wesleyan University, Middletown, Connecticut, where he also taught.

He had disciples who have carved names for themselves, such as P. Unnikrishnan, S. Sowmya, Savithri Sathyamurthy, Anuradha Subramanian, Seetha Narayanan, Vasumathi Nagarajan, Sukanya Raghunathan (veena), his daughter Geetha Ramanathan Bennett (veena player and a short story writer in Tamil) and her husband Frank Bennett, Vidya Hariharan (veena and vocal), Thiagarajan/Raju (Vocal), Banumathy Raghuraman (veena), Latha Radhakrishnan (violin and vocal), Padma Gadiyar (veena), Vanathy Raghuraman (Vocal), and the Krishnan Sisters (Padmapriya (veena and vocal), Harini (vocal) and Subhapriya (vocal).

He also composed many varnams and kritis, which have been popularised by his disciples. The American ethnomusicologist David Nelson studied with him.

In 1981, Ramanathan released an album of Carnatic music, Navagraha Krtis (The 9 Planets), Cāturdaṡa Rāgamālika (The 14 Worlds) and Srī Gurunā: By Muttuswāmī Dīkṣitar (1775-1835), on Folkways Records.

== See also ==
- Ramnad Raghavan
- T. Ranganathan
