= A Handful of Beauty =

Studio album by Shakti
- Released: 1976
- Recorded: August 1976
- Length: 47:55
- Label: Columbia

Shakti chronology
Shakti (1976)	A Handful of Beauty (1976)	Natural Elements (1977)

Professional ratings
Review scores
Source	Rating
AllMusic	3/5 stars
All About Jazz	(not rated)
The Rolling Stone Jazz Record Guide	3/5 stars

A Handful of Beauty is the first studio album, and second album overall, released by the world fusion band Shakti in 1976.

== Track listing ==
1. "La Danse du Bonheur" (John McLaughlin, L.Shankar) – 4:48
2. "Lady L" (Shankar) – 7:23
3. "India" (McLaughlin, Shankar) – 12:31
4. "Kriti" (Traditional South Indian, arr. McLaughlin, Shankar) – 2:58
5. "Isis" (McLaughlin, Shankar) – 15:11
6. "Two Sisters" (McLaughlin) – 4:41

== Personnel ==
=== Musicians ===
- John McLaughlin – acoustic guitar, guitar, arranger, producer
- L.Shankar – violin, arranger, vocals
- Zakir Hussain – percussion, tabla
- Vikku Vinayakram – percussion, vocals

=== Technical ===
- Dennis MacKay – engineer
- Steven Berkowitz – assistant
- Stephen W Tayler – assistant
- Richard Laird – photography

== Chart performance ==
Chart performance for A Handful of Beauty
Chart (1977)	Peak
US Billboard 200	168
US Billboard Jazz Albums	32
