= Kanjira Ganesh Kumar =

Indian musician

Natarajan Ganesh Kumar, popularly known as Kanjira Ganesh (born June 1, 1964) is an Indian percussionist, teacher and music composer. He develops new techniques to play the kanjira and is the first south Indian percussionist to receive a Fulbright Fellowship award, given by the United States Department of State.

He has also invented a synthetic Kanjira, released by Cooperman Frame Drums in Vermont, under the "artist innovation" series. He has accompanied south Indian musicians including MS Subbulakshmi, Balamurali Krishna, KJ Yesudas, Mandolin Srinivas, L Subramaniam and Ravikiran.

== Awards and honours ==
- Best Kanjira Artist - Krishnagana Sabha
- Best Kanjira Artist - Indian Fine Arts
- Best Kanjira Artist - Maharajapuram Vishwanatha Iyer Trust
- Asthana Vidhwan of Sri Kanchi Kamakotti Mutt
- Yuvakala Bharathi - Bharath Kalachar
