= Padhant =

Padhant in Hindustani classical music or Indian classical dance refers to the recitation of rhythmic syllables, known as bol, during a performance. The term is derived from the Hindi word padhna, meaning "to read, study or recite". Padhant is closely associated with the percussion instrument tabla and the classical dance Kathak, and the recitation of rhythmic patterns before playing them is considered an art in itself. The dancer in Kathak would pause at intervals to recite the rhythms before executing them through dance. The recitation is often accompanied by hand gestures. The recited syllables are also used in storytelling, creating an atmosphere or inducing a mood in the audience; for example, in a performance of Kalidasa's Meghaduta (Cloud Messenger), the sounds ghe-ghe-thi-ta can signify a rumble of clouds or, its expanded version, the arrival of clouds. In Carnatic music, a similar concept is called konnakol.
