= Natural Elements (Shakti album) =

Studio album by Shakti
- Released: 1977
- Recorded: Geneva, Switzerland, July 1977
- Genre: World
- Length: 39:30
- Label: CBS
- Producer: John McLaughlin

Shakti chronology
A Handful of Beauty (1976)	Natural Elements (1977)	Remember Shakti (1999)

John McLaughlin chronology
A Handful of Beauty (1976)	Natural Elements (1977)	Electric Guitarist (1978)

Professional ratings
Review scores
Source	Rating
All About Jazz	(not rated)
AllMusic	4/5 stars
The Rolling Stone Jazz Record Guide	4/5 stars

Natural Elements is a studio album by the world fusion band Shakti. It was released in 1977 on CBS Records.

== Track listing ==
1. "Mind Ecology" (John McLaughlin) – 5:48
2. "Face to Face" (McLaughlin / L. Shankar) – 5:58
3. "Come On Baby Dance with Me" (Shankar) – 1:59
4. "The Daffodil and the Eagle" (McLaughlin / Shankar) – 7:03
5. "Happiness Is Being Together" (McLaughlin) – 4:29
6. "Bridge of Sighs" (McLaughlin / Shankar) – 3:52
7. "Get Down and Sruti" (McLaughlin / Shankar) – 7:03
8. "Peace of Mind" (McLaughlin) – 3:21

== Personnel ==
Musicians

- John McLaughlin – guitar, acoustic guitar, vocals
- L. Shankar – viola, violin, vocals
- Zakir Hussain – bongos, dholak, percussion, tabla, timbales, triangle, vocals
- Vikku Vinayakram – ghatam, kanjeera, percussion, vocals

Production

- John Alcorn – illustrations
- Paula Scher – design
