= David Belove =

American jazz bass guitarist

David Belove is an American Afro-Cuban and Brazilian jazz bass guitarist based in the San Francisco Bay Area.

== Biography ==
Belove was born in Kansas City and relocated to California in the early 1980s. He studied at San Francisco State University and at the San Francisco Conservatory of Music. He later settled in Oakland.

Belove has recorded and toured with Pete and Sheila Escovedo, Tito Puente, Rebeca Mauleon-Santana, Claudia Villela, and Oscar Castro-Neves. He has also worked with jazz artists Joe Henderson, Max Roach, Dizzy Gillespie, and many others. He has been a member of various groups, including the Machete Ensemble, the Roger Glenn Latin Jazz Ensemble, the Latin Jazz All Stars, and Canoneo. He was also a member of the Wayne Wallace Latin Jazz Quintet, with whom he has been nominated for several Grammy Awards.

Belove has taught at the California Jazz Conservatory. He co-directed the school's Latin Jazz Ensemble.

Belove was featured in the documentary The Last Mambo.
