= Krishna Bhatt =

- Born: 1949 (age 76–77)
- Origin: Jaipur, India
- Genres: Indian classical music
- Instrument: sitar

Krishna Mohan Bhatt (born 1949) is a sitar player, teacher and scholar from Jaipur, India.

== Background ==
He comes from a family of musicians in Jaipur. His father, the late Shashi Mohan Bhatt, a sitarist of great repute and a professor at the University of Rajasthan, Jaipur trained many musicians in the family including Krishna Bhatt, Manju Mehta in Ahmedabad and Vishwa Mohan Bhatt. Krishna Bhatt's forefathers migrated from the south of India (Andhra Pradesh) to the state of Rajasthan in the northwest, a princely state then, to seek employment in the "Gunijankhānā" (department of learned scholars) of the Maharaja of Jaipur. They were Sanskrit scholars, poets, and musicians.

In his teens, Krishna's musical training was further enhanced by many years of study under the tutelage of his Guru Ravi Shankar, and musicians Nikhil Banerjee and Ali Akbar Khan, who had a strong impact on Krishna's musical growth. While developing his own individual style, Krishna's music was greatly influenced by twentieth century stalwarts such as the vocalists Amir Khan, Bade Gulam Ali Khan, Abdul Karim Khan, Begum Akhtar, Shobha Gurtu as well as folk singers of Rajasthan. Krishna's repertoire in performance includes a wide variety of rare and old traditional compositions from these masters of music.

== Career ==
Krishna Bhatt has received numerous awards and honors including the Sangeet Kalaratna (Jewel of Music) in 2009. He was also presented the "Gunijan" award by the President of India Mrs. Pratibha Patil in 2005 and was conferred the "Kalashiroman" samman by the Maharaja of Jodhpur Shri Gajsinghji and Shri John Singhji of Jaipur Virasat Foundation in 2007 in Rajasthan, India. Krishna Bhatt has been twice the recipient of the AIIS fellowship awards in 1998 and 2004 in the category of performing arts.

In addition to performing Hindustani classical music, Bhatt has also performed and recorded with the American composer Terry Riley (working on the score for the Alain Tanner film No Man's Land), Zakir Hussain, the Kronos Quartet, Jody Stecher, jazz saxophonist George Brooks, and Rajasthani folk musicians.

He plays tabla on Robert Ashley's 1978 record Private Parts.

He divides his time between Jaipur, Rajasthan and New York City, where he continues to perform and teach.
