= Remember Shakti =

British-Indian music quintet

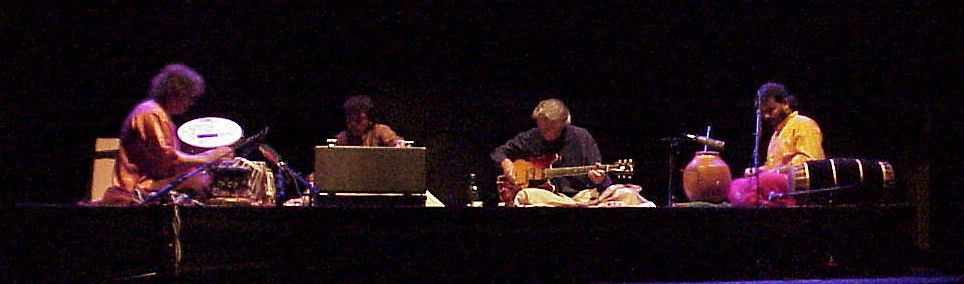
- (left to right) Zakir Hussain, U. Srinivas, John McLaughlin, V. Selvaganesh

Background information
- Origin: India, United Kingdom
- Genres: Carnatic music, world music, jazz fusion
- Years active: 1997–present
- Labels: Polygram; Universal Records; Verve Records
- Members: John McLaughlin; Zakir Hussain; Shankar Mahadevan; U. Srinivas; V. Selvaganesh
- Past members: Hariprasad Chaurasia; T.H. "Vikku" Vinayakram

Remember Shakti is a quintet which combines elements of traditional Indian music with elements of jazz. The band consists of English guitarist John McLaughlin, and Zakir Hussain (tabla), U. Srinivas (mandolin), Shankar Mahadevan (vocals), and V. Selvaganesh (kanjira, ghatam, mridangam), who are of Indian descent. The band's name is derived from John Mclaughlin's acoustic Indian fusion band Shakti which was active in the 1970s. McLaughlin and Hussain were also members of that band, along with violinist L. Shankar and percussionists T.H. "Vikku" Vinayakram and R. Raghavan. The word Shakti translates in Sanskrit to "power" or "goddess of power".

== Biography ==
After disbanding in the late 1970s, Shakti enjoyed a twenty-year hiatus before McLaughlin and Hussain decided to reform the band. In addition to John and Zakir, T.H. "Vikku" Vinayakram (ghatam, mridangam), returned for Remember Shakti's eponymous debut UK tour and album in 1997. However, McLaughlin could not locate Shakti's original fourth member, L. Shankar, so replaced him with bansuri player Hariprasad Chaurasia for the live recording of this album.

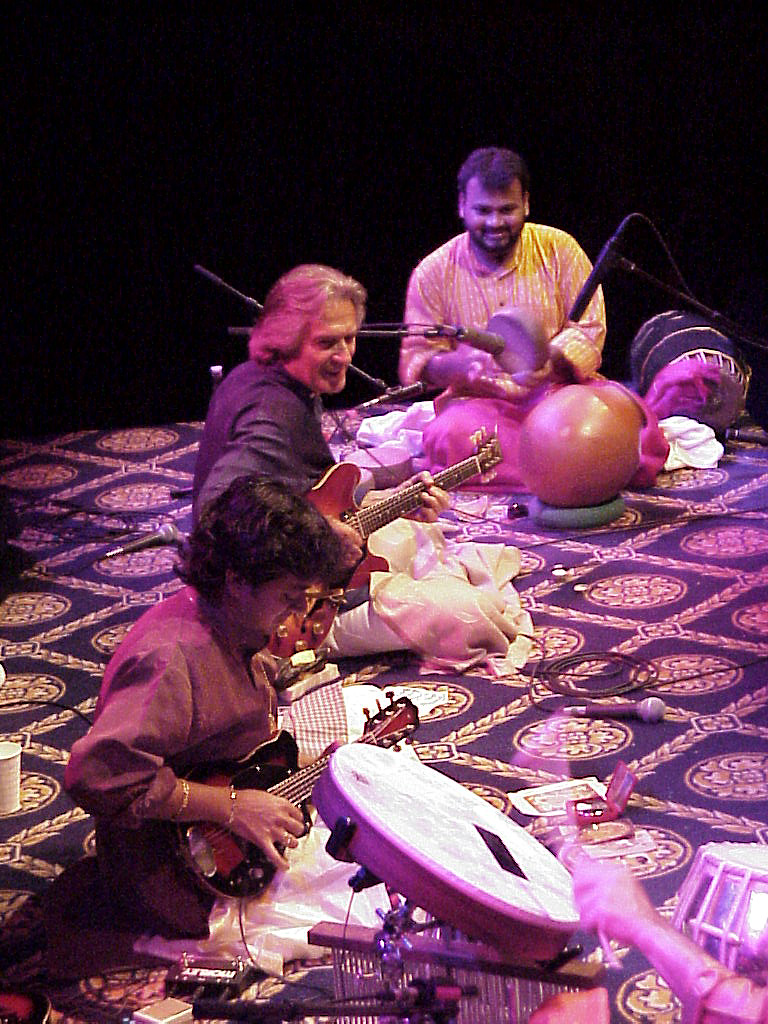
Remember Shakti Concert, Munich/Germany (2001) (left to right) U. Srinivas, John McLaughlin, V. Selvaganesh

For the band's next album, The Believer, recorded live and released in 1999, Chaurasia and Vinayakram were replaced by the late mandolin player U. Srinivas and Vinayakram's son V. Selvaganesh. The band's most recent live album, 2001's Saturday Night in Bombay, presents Remember Shakti augmented by an army of guests, notably Pt. Shivkumar Sharma (santoor), percussionist Taufiq Qureshi who is the brother of Zakir, and Shankar Mahadevan, who has now become Remember Shakti's full-time vocalist. The band has toured extensively all around the world.

== Concert tours ==
- January 2005: At the Gateway of India in Mumbai, as part of the Mumbai Festival
- December 2006: Mumbai
- February 2012: Pune, Mumbai, Goa, Hyderabad, Chennai and Ramallah, Palestine as part of the Remember Shakti India Tour 2012

== Discography ==
=== Full-length albums ===
https://www.allmusic.com/artist/shakti-mn0000158780/discography from 1975 to 2001

- Remember Shakti (1999)- Universal Records
- The Believer (2000)- Universal Records
- Saturday Night in Bombay (2001)- Universal Records
- Live at 38th Montreux Jazz Festival, 18 July 2004
- Live at Miles Davis Hall, 8 July 1999 (Disk 16 from the John McLaughlin's Montreux Concerts Box Set, released in 2004)
- Is that So? (2020)

=== DVDs/Videos ===
- The Way of Beauty directed by Partho Sen-Gupta (2006)- Universal Music France 983 762 6 .LC 00699

This DVD features a 60-minute documentary (Shakti Timeless) on the band starting from the early seventies. John and Zakir speak about their beginnings, their era with L. Shankar and T.H. Vinayakram.

The film was screened at the Durban International Film Festival 2007 from 20 June to 1 July 2007 in Durban, South Africa.

The DVD also includes:

1. 45 minutes of sound check footage of Remember Shakti before a Concert at the New Morning in Paris 2004
2. 55 minutes of a historic concert called Saturday Night in Bombay (Mumbai, India) in 2000.
3. Two Live Concerts of the band shot with the original band (with L. Shankar & "Vikku" T. H Vinayakram from New Morning 1976 (Montreux Jazz Festival) as well as Montreux Jazz 2004.
4. Also contains clips from Mahavishnu Orchestra in Syracuse, U.S. 1972. (Never seen before)

=== Box sets ===
- 'Remember Shakti (2002, Universal Records) – includes Remember Shakti, The Believer, Saturday Night in Bombay, bonus DVD performance of "Saturday Night in Bombay", and bonus track "Niyati"
