= Ramnad Raghavan =

Indian musician (1927–2009)

Ramnad V. Raghavan
- Born: Ramnad Vaidyanatha Raghavan; 19 June 1927; Madurai, Tamilnadu
- Died: 21 November 2009 (aged 82); Chennai, Tamilnadu
- Occupation: Mridangam player
- Parent(s): P. Vaidyanatha Iyer, Brihanayaki

Ramnad V. Raghavan (19 June 1927 – 21 November 2009) was a player of the mridangam. He was born in Madurai, Tamil Nadu, India, to P. Vaidyanatha Ayyar of Kooniyur, Tirunelveli district, and Brhannayaki. His elder brother Ramnad Krishnan was a famous Carnatic vocalist.

Beginning in 1970, he taught for many years at Wesleyan University in Connecticut, United States. He was also a key initiator for the Cleveland Thyagaraja Aradhana. He retired around 2000 and moved to Chennai, India. He died on 21 November 2009 at the age of 82 in Chennai. His students have included Glen Velez, Jamey Haddad, David Nelson, Patricia Shehan Campbell, Frank Bennett, and Joseph M. Getter.

== See also ==
- T. Ranganathan
- S. Ramanathan
