= U. Srinivas =

Indian mandolin player (1969–2014)

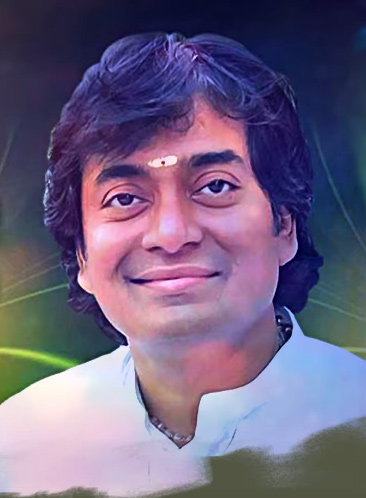
- U. Srinivas

Background information
- Also known as: U. Srinivas, Mandolin Srinivas
- Born: Uppalapu Srinivas; 28 February 1969; Palakollu, West Godavari District, Andhra Pradesh, India
- Origin: Andhra Pradesh, India
- Died: 19 September 2014 (aged 45) Chennai, Tamil Nadu, India
- Genre: Indian classical music
- Occupation: Musician (Mandolin Maestro)
- Instrument: Electric Mandolin
- Years active: 1978–2014
- Labels: Real World Records; Virgin Classics/EMI
- Website: Mandolin U Shrinivas

Uppalapu Srinivas (28 February 1969 – 19 September 2014) was an Indian mandolin player in Carnatic classical music and composer.

He was awarded the Padma Shri in 1998, by the Government of India. He was also awarded the Sangeet Natak Akademi Award in 2009 given by Sangeet Natak Akademi, which is the National Academy of Music, Dance & Drama, in India.

== Early life and background ==
Srinivas was born 28 February 1969, in Palakollu in Andhra Pradesh. At the age of five, he picked up his father U. Satyanarayana's mandolin, after he heard it being played at a concert he attended with his father. Upon realizing the talent of his son, his father, who had studied classical music, bought him a new mandolin, and started teaching him. Guitarist Vasu Rao, introduced seven-year-old Srinivas to western music in 1976. Soon, Satyanarayana's guru, Rudraraju Subbaraju, (disciple of Chembai Vaidyanatha Bhagavathar) who had also taught Srinivas' father and Vasu Rao, recognized the potential of the young Srinivas and started teaching him. Since Rudraraju Subbaraju did not know how to play the mandolin, he would just sing pieces from the Carnatic classical repertoire, and U. Srinivas, all of six, would play them on the mandolin, thus developing a phenomenal style of playing entirely his own, and astonishingly, on an instrument that had never been played in the rigorous and difficult Carnatic style before. Soon, the family moved to Chennai, the hotspot of Carnatic music, where most Carnatic musicians live. When Srinivas gave his first performance it led to him being compared to the world's greatest prodigies: "Some of you have heard or read about exceptionally gifted children, our own Mandolin Srinivas, Sir Yehudi Menuhin, Beethoven, Sir Isaac Newton, Picasso, Madam Curie, the list is endless."

At a young age he was internationally viewed as the successor to Pandit Ravi Shankar.

== Career ==
He made his debut public Carnatic concert performance in 1978 during the Thyagaraja Aradhana festival at Gudivada in Andhra Pradesh. Thereafter, at age eleven, in 1981, he gave his first public concert in Chennai at the Indian Fine Arts Society during the December Music Season, and never looked back. He started off playing the acoustic mandolin, but he later switched to the electric mandolin as he felt it allowed the playing of lengthy, sustained notes - the quintessential component in classical Indian music - in addition to making them clearly audible. George Harrison's favorite piece of Indian music was Mandolin Ecstasy. "It was, like, my dad's favourite album of all time," says (Dhani) Harrison. "U Srinivas is 27 now and still making music. He plays an electric five-string mandolin, he's fantastic...."

Over his career, he toured across the world, and collaborated with John McLaughlin, Michael Nyman, and Michael Brook.

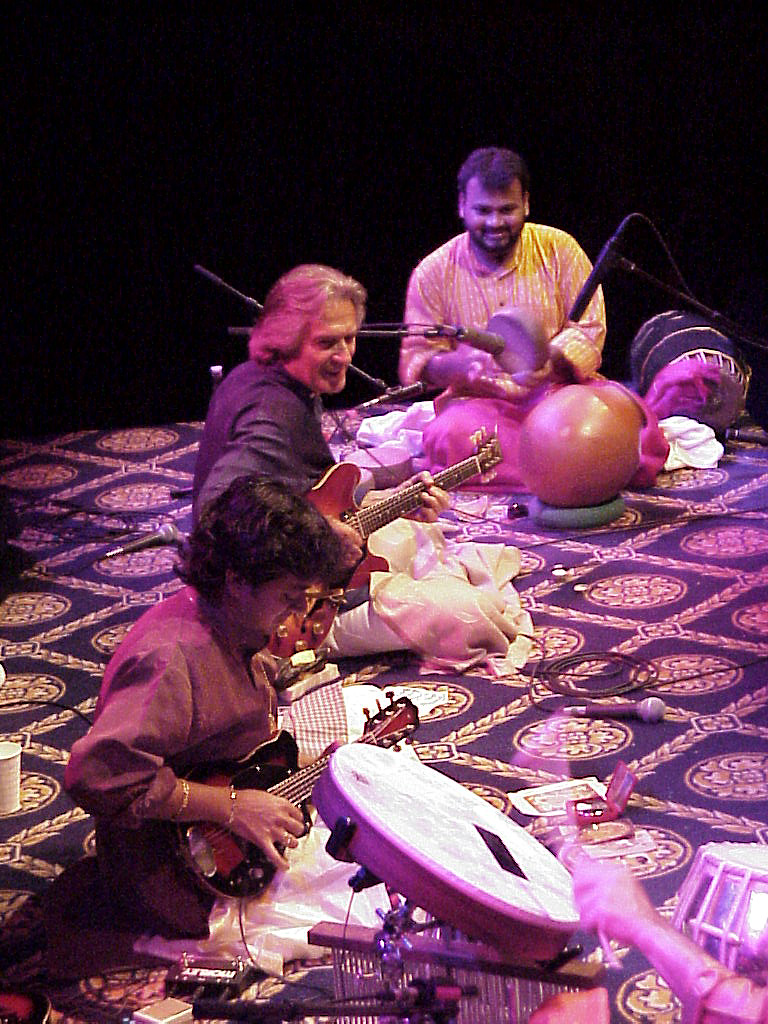
Remember Shakti Concert, Munich, Germany (2001) (left to right) U. Srinivas, John McLaughlin, V. Selvaganesh

"Collaborating with him (U.Srinivas) was one of the greatest experiences of my life, and I have played with the greatest"

— John McLaughlin, speaking with The Times of India

He was the first musician to use the electric mandolin in Carnatic music: he modified the electric western instrument, using five single strings instead of the traditional four doubled strings to suit the Carnatic pitch, raga system, and especially gamakas, or nuanced oscillations. Starting in 1982, he performed regularly during the December season of the prestigious Madras Music Academy, performing there every year except in 2002 - 23 December of each year was a reserved slot for U. Srinivas - the highest accolade. Srinivas performed at age thirteen at the Berlin Jazz Festival. Initially booked to play a half-hour concert after Miles Davis, Srinivas won a standing ovation, and had to play for another hour. "He's got it in him. He's fantastic," said the legendary Don Cherry at the time. Guitarist John McLaughlin first heard a tape of this concert by the thirteen-year-old prodigy, and was left very impressed. He played at the Olympic Arts Festival, Barcelona in 1992 and in 1995 recorded a successful fusion album with Michael Brook. When John McLaughlin revived his group Shakti, and renamed it Remember Shakti, in 1997, he asked Srinivas to join the group and tour the world with it, along with other Indian musicians Zakir Hussain, Shankar Mahadevan, and V. Selvaganesh. Srinivas was a leading player of the group. Srinivas toured extensively across the world, in his own right - he played in Australia, Southeast Asia, Southwest Asia, and extensively and frequently across the United States and Canada.

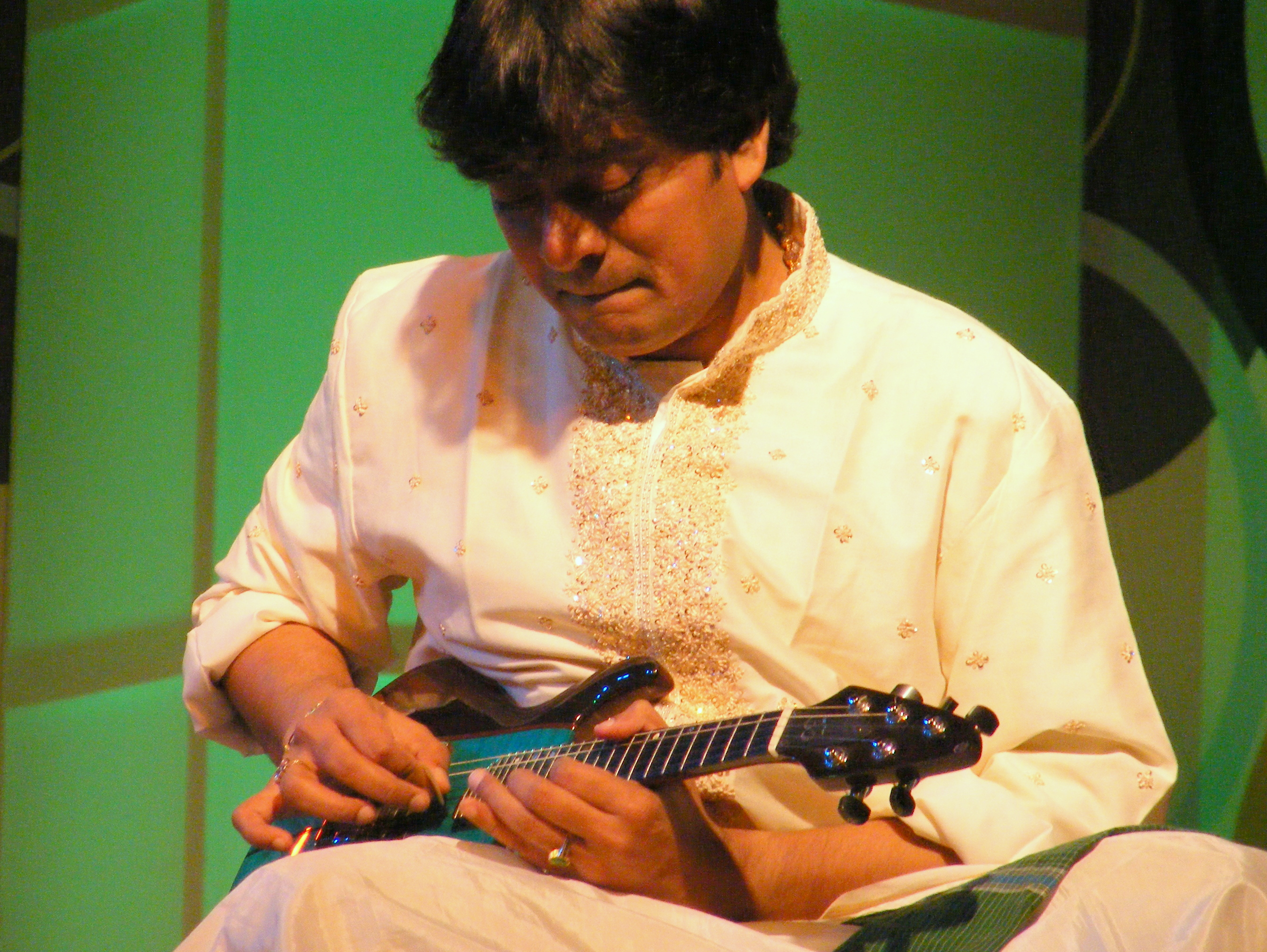
Srinivas performing in Pune, January to December 2009

Tatvameruga tarama, performed by U. Srinivas

His gifted younger brother, U. Rajesh studied with Srinivas for some 27 years and is also an accomplished mandolin player who often accompanied him at concerts during the last 20 years of his life. He also plays jazz and western music, and played the mandolin in the John Mclaughlin album 'Floating Point' which received a Grammy nomination in the Best Contemporary Jazz Album Category in 2008. Srinivas and Rajesh have together composed music as well, and, besides Carnatic music, they have extensively worked on the fusion of Carnatic and western music. They also played with the Johannesburg Philharmonic Orchestra, with French electric bass player Dominique Di Piazza, pianist Anil Srinivasan and Stephen Devassy, a pianist from Kerala. In 2008, they collaborated again with John Mclaughlin for the album Samjanitha, which also featured Zakir Hussain, Sivamani, and George Brook. Srinivas compared Carnatic music to the Sanskrit language, "It's the basis, from which spring so many other languages. Carnatic music is here to stay with us and all other music that we play is based on that."

Over the years, Srinivas recorded over 137 albums, in diverse genres from Carnatic music solos to jugalbandis with Hindustani musicians, and world music. He performed with Western artists such as John McLaughlin, Michael Brook, Trey Gunn, Nigel Kennedy, Nana Vasconcelos, and Michael Nyman, as well as with Hindustani music artists such as Hariprasad Chaurasia and Zakir Hussain, besides Carnatic artists like Vikku Vinayakram and V. Selvaganesh. U. Srinivas started a music school called the Srinivas Institute of World Music (SIOWM) in Chennai, where, since he was barely eighteen, he taught a number of students gratis. Srinivas has trained almost a hundred students worldwide, many of whom have studied with him and U. Rajesh for as long as ten years. U. Rajesh continues teaching their students at the SIOWM.

== Instrument ==
Srinivas' first mandolin belonged to his father, a clarinetist. That instrument was a 'standard' Western mandolin; however, he made modifications to suit his playing style over the course of his musical career.

Srinivas started out on the acoustic mandolin, but neither the size nor plucking required of the acoustic mandolin was suited for long, sustained notes. He then switched to the electric mandolin, which was better suited for sustained notes and musical ornamentations. In 1999, he credited American player Tiny Moore with the invention of the five-string electric mandolin. Five-strings are often tuned C-G-D-A-E, adding a mandola's low string to the mandolin, but Srinivas said his tuning at the time was E-A-D-G-G He later tuned his five strings to CGCGC. (He sometimes played an instrument built with a sixth tuner, which he did not use.) Copies of his style of mandolin are available in India, and several other Indian mandolin players have used instruments like it (including his brother, U.Rajesh).

== Personal life ==
Srinivas married U. Sree, daughter of a vigilance officer from Andhra Pradesh, and veena player, in 1994. The couple had a son, Sai Krishna (also known as Naani Krissh, a director who made his directorial debut with Opperah in 2017), and were divorced in 2012. After their divorce U. Sree received custody of their son.

U. Srinivas was an ardent devotee of the Paramacharya of Kanchi. He was also a follower and devotee of Sri Sathya Sai Baba and had performed in front of him on several occasions.

== Illness and death ==
Srinivas (also known as Mandolin Shrinivas) was undergoing treatment for a liver condition and had undergone a liver transplant on 11 September 2014. While recovering, he died at Apollo Hospital at 9:30 AM on 19 September 2014 after experiencing complications.

== Awards and achievements ==
Some of the awards that Mandolin U. Srinivas received:

- Padma Shri in 1998, given by Government of India
- Sangeet Natak Akademi Award in 2010, given by Sangeet Natak Akademi
- Sangeet Ratna
- Sanatan Sangeet Puraskar from Sangeet Sanskriti
- Titled ′Asthana Vidwan′ (at age 15), of the Tamil Nadu in July 1984, Kanchi Kamakoti Peetam on 1 October 1990, at Sringeri, at Kalahasti temple, at Mantralayam Raghavendra Matha in 2006, Pillayarpatti Temple on 27 August 1995
- Raja-Lakshmi Award for the year 1985 from Sri Raja-Lakshmi Foundation, Chennai
- T. Chowdiah Memorial National Award, Mysore, Karnataka in 1992
- Sangeetha Bala Bhaskara by Sangeetha Kalanidhi M.S. Subbulakshmi in 1995
- Sangeetha Choodamani Award in 1985
- National Citizen's Award, 1991 by President of India
- Special TTK Award and Best Artist Award by the Madras Music Academy in 1983 and 1993 respectively
- Rajiv Gandhi National Integration Award
- Madhya Pradesh Government Award, in 2004 by the Government of Madhya Pradesh
- Maharajapuram Santhanam Award, in 2010
- Lifetime Achievement Award, in 2014 by Mahindra Finance on 17 January 2015

== Discography ==
He recorded a CD of Carnatic compositions by Ilaiyaraaja called Ilaiyaraaja's Classics in Mandolin. In 2008, U Srinivas released Samjanitha featuring Debashish Bhattacharya (Lap Steel Guitar), John McLaughlin, Zakir Hussain, Sivamani, Vikku Vinaykram, Dominique di Piazza Michael Brook, U Rajesh and others.

Partial discography:

- Mandolin - Master U. Srinivas (Magnasound, 1986)
- Mandolin Ecstasy (Oriental, 1986)
- Magic Mandolin (Chhanda Dhara, 1989)
- Music on Mandolin (Super Cassette, 1990)
- Double Mandolin (The Master Company, 1991)
- Modern Mandolin Maestro (GlobeStyle, 1991)
- Trio Mandolin (Koel, 1992)
- Mandolin Duets (EMI, 1994)
- Prodigy (Koel, 1994)
- Rama Sreerama (Real World Records, 1994)
- Dream, with Michael Brook (Real World/Virgin/EMI, 1995)
- Dawn Raga (Womad, 1996)
- Marvels on Mandolin (Magnasound, 1996)
- Mandolin (Geethanjali, 1998)
- Mystic Raptures (Music Today, 2000)
- Remember Shakti: The Believer (Verve/Universal, 2000)
- Mandolin Magic (Dunya, 2001)
- Gamanashrama (Charsur, 2003)
- Sangam: Michael Nyman Meets Indian Masters (WEA, 2003)
- Om Nama Shivaya (Sea, 2004)
- Five Star (Saregama 2004)
- Mandolin Melodies: South Indian Classical Music (Felmay, 2005)
- Ragasangamam (Music Today, 2006)
- Sahavaadhan (Living 2006)
- Samjanitha (Dreyfus Records, 2008)
- Chinnanchiru Kiliye (Music Today, 2011)
- Sangeet Santaj Vol. 1 & 2 (Music Today, 2011)
- Ru-Ba-Ru: A Unique Confluence of Sarangi & Mandolin (Music Today, 2011)
- Dikshitar Masterpieces (Music Today, 2011)

For the Sangeetha Music label, U. Srinivas recorded the following albums:

- Mokshamugalada
- Nadasudharasa
- Double Mandolin
- Meenakshi Memudam
- Pancharatna Kritis –Trio Mandolin
- Magnetic Mandolin
- Naada Brahmaanandam (Double Mandolin)
- Naanu Palimpa
- Vaathapi on Mandolin
- Endaro Mahanubhavulu
- Enduko Dayaradura
- Gaana Sampoornam
- Mandolin Ganamrutham

== Bibliography ==
- Lavezzoli, Peter (2006). The Dawn of Indian Music in the West. A&C Black. ISBN 978-0-8264-1815-9.
- Broughton, Simon; Ellingham, Mark (2000). World Music: Latin and North America, Caribbean, India, Asia and Pacific. Rough Guides. ISBN 978-1-85828-636-5.
