= V. Selvaganesh =

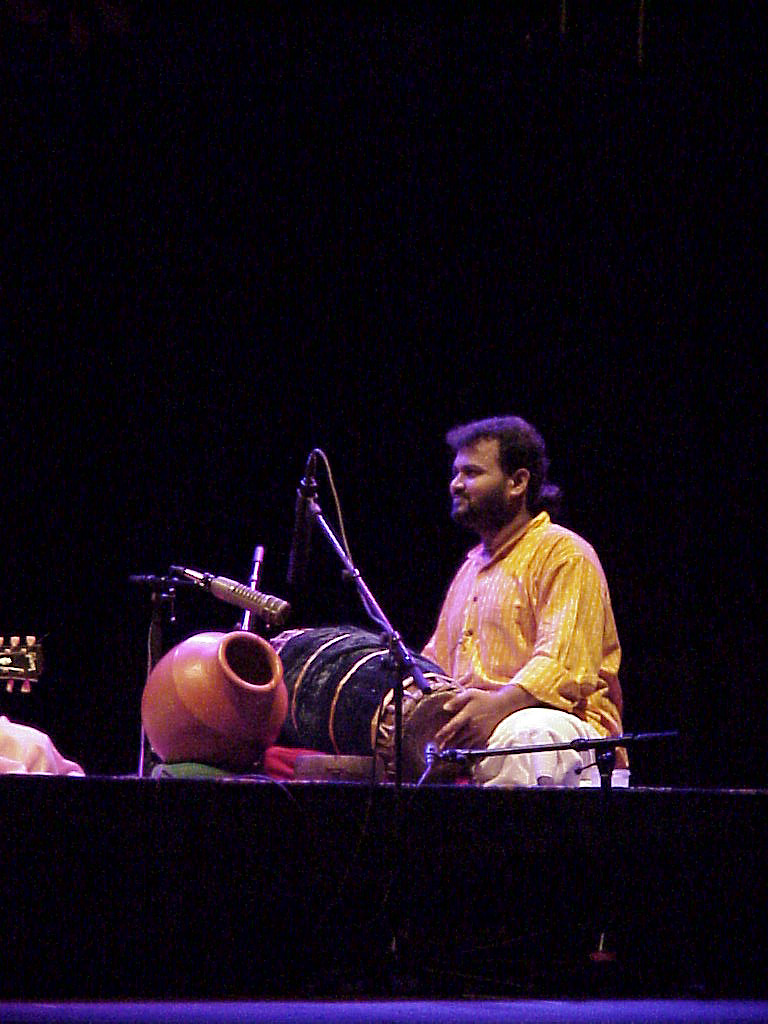
- V. Selvaganesh

Background information
- Born: 28 December 1966 (age 59); Madras, Madras State (now Chennai, Tamil Nadu), India
- Genre: Carnatic classical music
- Occupations: Composer, Percussionist
- Instruments: Kanjira, Mridangam

V. Selvaganesh is an Indian percussionist working in the Carnatic tradition and one of the leading kanjira (south Indian frame drum) players of his generation. He is also known as "Chella S. Ganesh."

== Career ==
Selvaganesh gained world fame through tours with John McLaughlin's group, Remember Shakti. He helps his father, Grammy-Nominated T.H. "Vikku" Vinayakram, to run the Sri JGTV school and train a new generation of Carnatic percussionists. He has also composed and produced albums and played with the Swedish bass player Jonas Hellborg and American guitar virtuoso Shawn Lane.

In 2012, Selvaganesh made his film directorial debut with Bodhai, a short film in Tamil. He also composed the four-track soundtrack which was released in digital format by Saregama.

He is a part of the band Shakti that won the 2024 Grammy Award for the Best Global Music Album.

=== Film career ===
V. Selvaganesh made his debut composing for films with the Tamil movie Vennila Kabadi Kuzhu and has composed music for a number of films in Tamil and Telugu.

== Discography ==
Solo Albums

- Soukha (2006)
- Kanjourney (2016)

With Jonas Hellborg

- Good People in Times of Evil (2000)
- Icon: A Transcontinental Gathering (2003)
- Kali's Son (2006)
- Art Metal (2007)

With John Mclaughlin

- Remember Shakti - The Believer (2000)
- Remember Shakti – Saturday Night in Bombay (2001)
- Shakti - This Moment

As film composer

- Note: ♦ indicates a remake film.

Year	Tamil	Telugu	Notes
2008	Vennila Kabadi Kuzhu	Bheemili Kabaddi Jattu ♦ (2010)	
2010	Kola Kolaya Mundhirika		
2010	Drohi		
2010	Nil Gavani Sellathey		
2011	Kullanari Koottam		
2011		Pilla Zamindar	
2012		Shiva Manasulo Shruti	
2013	Nirnayam		Also producer
2013	Rettai Vaalu		
2016	Arthanari		
2017		Chitrangada	
2019	Vennila Kabaddi Kuzhu 2		
