= Kanjira =

South Indian frame drum

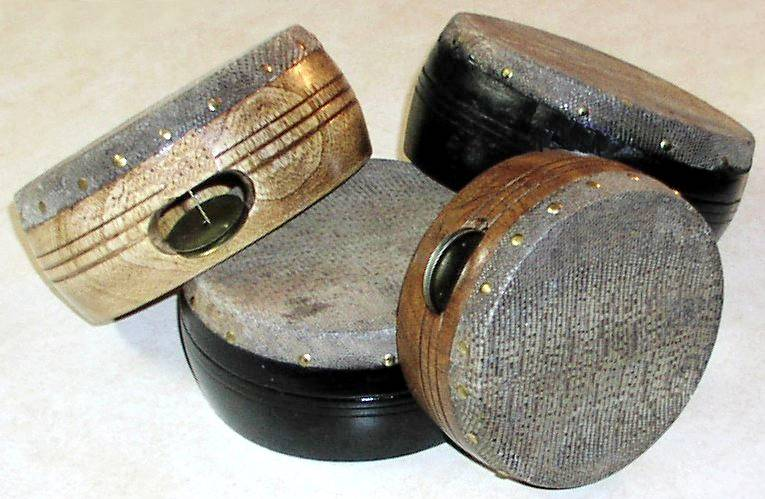

Percussion instrument
- Other names: ganjira
- Classification: Frame drum
- Hornbostel–Sachs classification: 211.311 (Directly struck membranophone)

The kanjira, khanjira, khanjiri or ganjira, a South Indian frame drum, is an instrument of the tambourine family. As a folk and bhajan instrument, it has been used in the Indian subcontinent for many centuries.

The Kanjira's emergence in South Indian Carnatic music, as well as the development of the modern form of the instrument, is credited to Manpoondia Pillai. In the 1880s, Manpoondia Pillai was a temple lantern-bearer who sought to study drumming. He modified the kanjira to a frame drum with a single pair of jingles and brought the instrument to a classical stage.

It is used primarily in concerts of Carnatic music (South Indian classical music) as a supporting instrument for the mridangam.

== Etymology ==
The word might have morphed from the Tamil word, கஞ்சிலி (kañchili), itself made of the Sanskrit term- कञ्चुक (kañcuka), referring to its lizard skin, and சிலி (chili), or "thing that produces sound".

== Construction ==
Similar to the Western tambourine, it consists of a circular frame made of the wood of the jackfruit tree, between 7 and 9 inches in width and 2 to 4 inches in depth. It is covered on one side with a drumhead made of monitor lizard skin (specifically the Bengal monitor, Varanus bengalensis, now an endangered species in India), while the other side is left open. The traditional lizard skin is prohibited worldwide due to protection of species regulations. Even well-known Kanjira players, however, attest to the great advantages of using goat skin as an alternative. After playing for a while, the goat skin gets more and more flexible and offers a wider range of possible modulations. The frame has a single slit which contain three to four small metal discs (often old coins) that jingle when the kanjira is played.

== Play ==
The kanjira is a relatively difficult Indian drum to play, especially in South Indian Carnatic music, for reasons including the complexity of the percussion patterns used in Indian music. It is normally played with the palm and fingers of the right hand, while the left hand supports the drum. The fingertips of the left hand can be used to bend the pitch by applying pressure near the outer rim. It is not tuned to any particular pitch, unlike the mridangam or the ghatam.

Normally, without tuning, it has a very high pitched sound. To get a good bass sound, the performer reduces the tension of the drumhead by sprinkling water on the inside of the instrument. This process may have to be repeated during a concert to maintain a good sound. However, if the instrument is too moist, it will have a dead tone, requiring 5–10 minutes to dry. Tone is also affected by external temperature and moisture conditions. Performers typically carry a couple of kanjiras so that they can keep at least one in perfectly tuned condition at any given time.

Depending on dexterity, surprising glissando effects like on the Tabla are possible.

== Nepal ==
Nepalese performance using a variety of Khaijadi tambourines.

In Nepal the Kanjira is called Khaijadi (खैंजडी). The country has a variety of tambourines besides the Khaijadi, including the Daanf, Damphu (डम्फू) and Hring. The instrument is used in dances and chants at festivals.

One example is the Khanjadi bhajan (खैंजडी भजन), hymns sung in the Chhetri-Brahmin society. It is customary to sing this khanjadi bhajan in the Kathmandu Valley as well as in most parts of the eastern hills. Most of the performers are from the regional Brahmin community, but all castes are entertained as spectators and listeners. The event includes dancers dancing in pairs while Chudka hymns are sung by the musicians and audience. The event uses Puranic Hindu scriptures. This type of hymn uses a mixture of both verse and prose. At the beginning, part of the story is presented in prose. Then the lyrical hymn begins. To sing a hymn, one has to study the religious texts extensively and be able to give it its original form. The voice of the psalmist should also be such that it can attract everyone. In the same way, there should be singers who can play the khanjadi used in the psalms skillfully and know how to dance.

== Players ==
- G. Harishankar
- V. Nagarajan
- C. P. Vyasa Vittala
- Bangalore Amrit
- B. Shree Sundarkumar
- V. Selvaganesh
- Swaminathan Selvaganesh
- A.S.N.Swamy
- B.S. Purushotham
- G. Guru Prasanna
- N. Ganesh Kumar
- S Sunil Kumar
- Nerkunam Sankar
- Anirudh Athreya
- Hariharasharma
- KV Gopalakrishnan
- Sunaad Anoor
- Kadirvel
- B.N. Chandramouli
- Kadanad Ananthakrishnan
- Ragesh V Ramakrishnan
