= T. H. Vinayakram =

Indian percussionist (born 1942)

Thetakudi Harihara Vinayakram
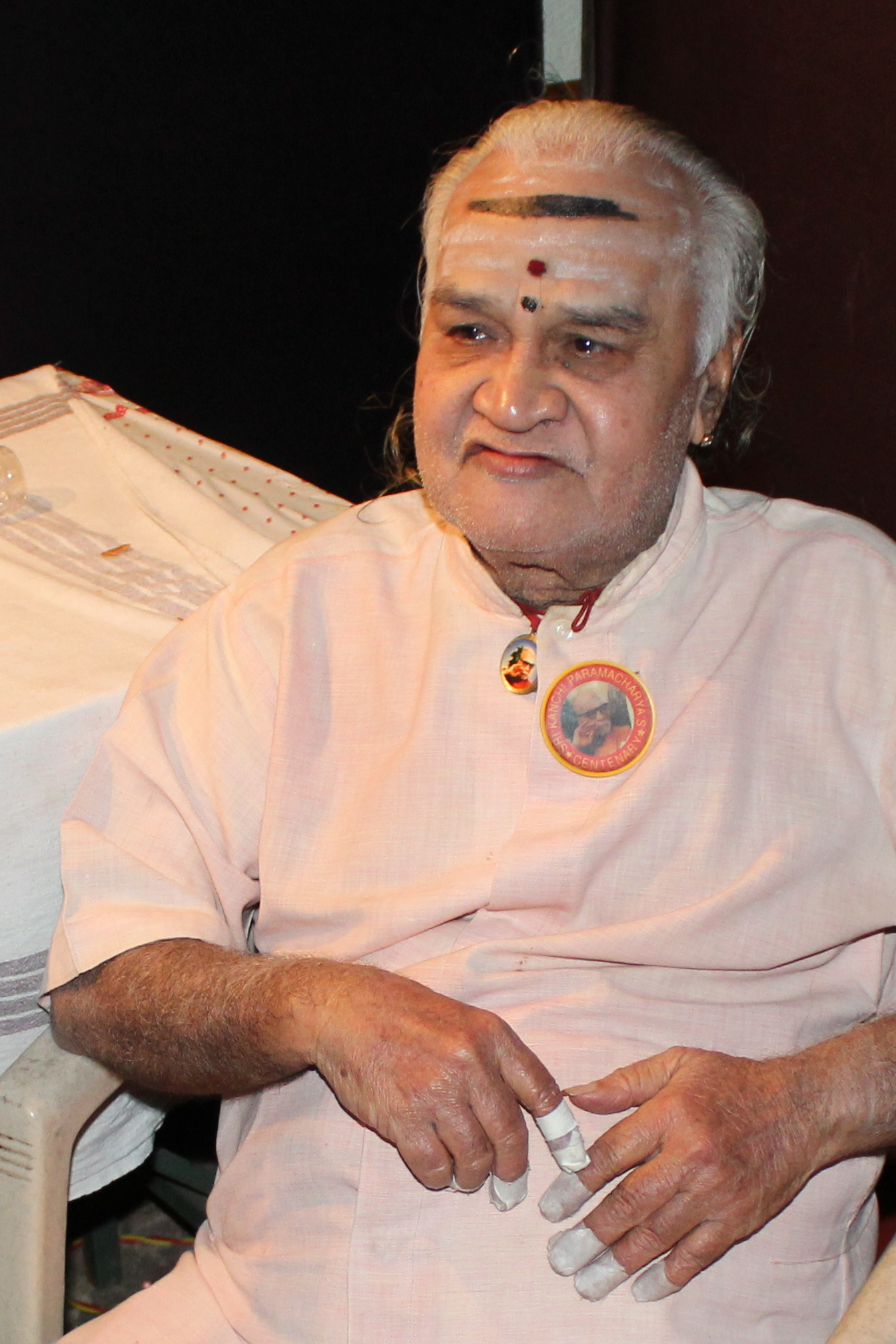

Background information
- Born: 11 August 1942 (age 83); Madras, Madras Presidency, British India
- Genres: Carnatic, Fusion
- Occupation: percussionist
- Instruments: Ghatam, Morsing, Kavin
- Years active: 1951–present

Thetakudi Harihara Vinayakram (born 11 August 1942), also known as Vikku Vinayakram, is an Indian percussionist. He is also known as the God of ghatam. He plays Carnatic music with the ghatam, an earthen pot, and is credited with popularising the ghatam.

He was awarded the Padma Shri by the Government of India in 2002, and later the 2012 Sangeet Natak Akademi Fellowship, the highest honour in the performing arts conferred by the Sangeet Natak Akademi, India's National Academy for Music, Dance and Drama. In 2014 he was awarded the Padma Bhushan. He won Grammy award in 1991 for his work on Mickey Hart's album Planet Drum.

== Early life ==
Vinayakram was born to Kalaimaamani T. R. Harihara Sharma, a musician and teacher. He took up playing at a very young age.

== Career ==
Vinayakram's concert career began at the age of 13. His first performance was on 5 March 1957 at the Rama Navami festival in Thoothukudi. While proceeding for the arangetram the tuned ghatam instrument was broken by a child named Ganesh, which by itself had been a good omen for his bright career. where he accompanied V.V.Sadagopan. He was soon accompanying many vocalists in Carnatic music at the time, including Chembai Vaidyanatha Bhagavatar, M K Thiagaraja Bagavathar, Dr Sirkazhi S.Govindarajan, Mangalampalli Balamuralikrishna, G. N. Balasubramaniam, Madurai Mani Iyer, Semmangudi Srinivasa Iyer, M. S. Subbulakshmi and Maharajapuram Santhanam. His brother, T. H. Subhash Chandran, also excelled in the field. The Ghatam rose to fame as a percussion instrument that required nimble fingers and strong stomach muscles to control the mouth of the pot.

Vinayakram's tryst with the international music platform came in the early 1970s when he joined Shakti to play along with John McLaughlin and Zakir Hussain.

His combination with Mandolin U.Srinivas and Violin A. Kanyakumari was also famous. He has also performed at Basant Utsav, the annual fund raiser for the Banyan.

Vinayakram is Principal of Sri Jaya Ganesh Tala Vadya Vidyalaya in Chennai, India – the academy established by his late father and teacher in 1958. It continues to produce new stars of Carnatic percussion. Vinayakram's son V. Selvaganesh is a percussionist, especially after tours with John McLaughlin's group, Remember Shakti.

== Awards ==
Vinayakram won the 1991 Grammy Awards for Best World Music Album for his work in Mickey Hart's Album Planet Drum.

Later he was also nominated for the 1996 Grammy Awards for Best World Music Album for his participation in 'Raga Aberi' along with L. Shankar on the ten string double violin and Zakir Hussain on the tabla (the piece is set in the tala cycle of 4¾ beats). The Indian Government decorated him with the Padma Shri Award in 2002.

Finally, he was awarded the 2012 Sangeet Natak Akademi Fellowship (Akademi Ratna), the highest award in performing arts in India, given by Sangeet Natak Akademi, India's National Academy for Music, Dance and Drama. In 2014 he was awarded the Padma Bhushan by the Government of India.

Vinayakram was awarded Dr.M.S.Subbulakshmi Centenary award, on 16 September 2016.

== Discography ==
- A Handful of Beauty (Shakti Album) (1976)
- Natural Elements (1977)
- Planet Drum (1991) – Mickey Hart
- Straight to your Heart (1990) – Nadaka & Ganesh Rajagopalan
- Mysterium Tremendum (2012) – Mickey Hart Band
