= Ghatam =

Indian percussion instrument

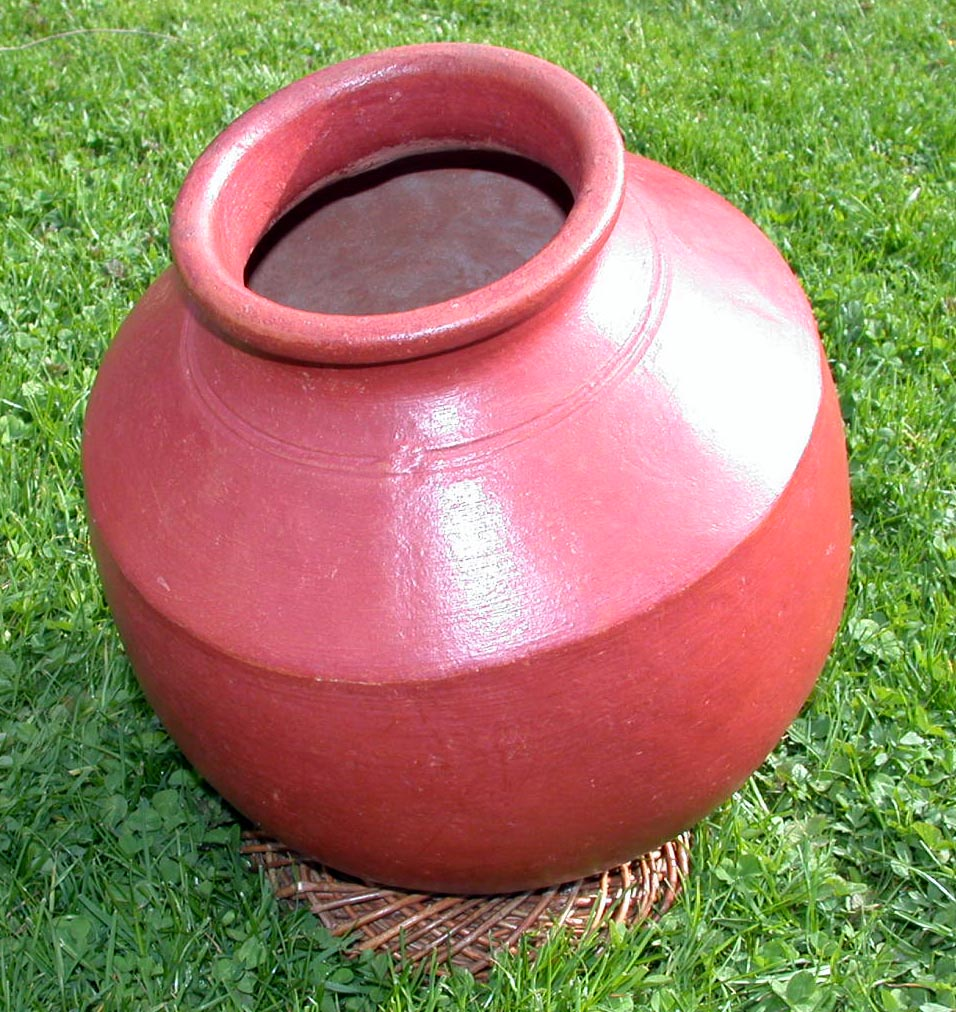

Percussion instrument
- Hornbostel–Sachs classification: 111.24 (Percussion vessels)
- Developed: ancient

Related instruments
- Botija, gharha

The ghaṭam (Sanskrit: घट ghaṭ; Kannada: ಘಟ ghaṭa; Tamil: கடம் ghatam; Telugu: ఘటం ghataṃ; Malayalam: ഘടം ghataṃ) is a percussion instrument used in various repertoires across the Indian subcontinent, especially in Southern India. Its variant is played in Punjab and known as gharha as it is a part of Punjabi folk traditions. Its analogue in Rajasthan is known as the madga and pani mataqa ("water jug").

The ghatam is one of the most ancient percussion instruments in India and Pakistan. It is a clay pot with a narrow mouth. From the mouth, it slants outwards to form a ridge. Made mainly of clay baked with brass or copper filings with a small amount of iron filings, the pitch of the ghatam varies according to its size. The pitch can be slightly altered by the application of plasticine clay or water.

Although the ghatam is the same shape as an ordinary Indian domestic clay pot, it is made specifically to be played as an instrument. The tone of the pot must be good and the walls should be of even thickness to produce an even tone and nice sound.

Ghatams are mostly manufactured in Manamadurai, a place near Madurai in Tamil Nadu. Though this instrument is manufactured in other places like Chennai and Bangalore, too, Manamadurai ghatams have special tonal quality. It is believed that the mud is of special quality. The Manamadurai ghaṭam is a heavy, thick pot with tiny shards of brass mixed into the clay. This type of ghaṭam is harder to play but produces a sharp metallic ringing sound which is favored by some players.

== Playing ==
It is played with the heel of the palms and the fingers, while held in the lap, the mouth facing the stomach of the musician. By changing the distance between the pot and the stomach, the musician can vary the tone of the instrument.

The pot is usually placed on the lap of the performer, with the mouth of the instrument facing the belly of the performer. The performer uses their fingers, thumbs, palms, and heels of the hands to strike its outer surface to produce different sounds. Different tones can be produced by hitting areas of the pot with different parts of the hands. Sometimes the ghatam is turned around so that the mouth faces towards the audience and the performer plays on the neck of the instrument. The ghatam can be moved to multiple different positions while being played. Occasionally, the performer will, to the amusement of the audience, toss the instrument up in the air and catch it. The ghatam is ideal for playing rhythmic patterns in very fast tempo.

The artist sits cross-legged on the floor and holds the Ghatam close to his [or her] body with the opening near the abdomen. The Bass effect is got by pressing and releasing the Ghatam to the abdomen and striking the body of the Ghatam by the lower parts of the wrists. For Treble sounds, fingers are used to strike the Ghatam at different parts to get different sounds. The bols are the same as for Mridangam. The Ghatam is used together with the Mridangam in concerts.

== Etymology ==
The name ghaṭam is etymologically derived from the Sanskrit term ghaṭa (pot) and the related term, kuṇḍa (pitcher). The cognate term for pot in Tamil is kuḍam (water pot). It is noteworthy that in Tamil the term ghaṭam specifically carries the meaning of a percussive musical instrument, although in Sanskrit it is a generic word for a pot of any kind.

== Similar instruments ==
The madga is a north Indian version of the south Indian ghaṭam and is made from a very special clay. The maker sometimes adds some kind of metal or graphite dust to the clay which is responsible for the blue-gray appearance and for the special sound.

The madga can be played similarly to the ghaṭam. Loud bass tones can be produced if one hits with the flat hand the opening at the top of the instrument. The madga can be played with mallets (sticks) and there are many sounds which can be produced with this instrument. It is thinner than a ghaṭam but very stable and not as fragile as one might think.

In Gujarat and Rajasthan,

This clay pot is known as matka and features an almost perfectly round shape (tuned to C♯) and is made in many villages in and around Jaipur (Rajasthan) and Gujarat. The matka is used to store water and sometimes yogurt (curd) and can be used as a cooking vessel. When used as a musical instrument in folk music, it is known as ghaṛa and is played in a similar manner as the South Indian ghaṭam but the technique and rhythmic style is not as refined as that of Carnatic ghaṭam. Another difference is that the ghara is often traditionally played with metal rings on the thumbs, index, middle, and ring fingers of both hands (but players vary on how many rings and fingers are used). There are a few versions of this instrument. Some are made from a black clay that typically comes from a single area in Rajasthan while many others in Rajasthan and Gujarat are made from a reddish clay. A third version of the ghaṛa is made from reddish clay but features a much flatter, squat shape. Both of the red clay types can also be found highly decorated with colorfully painted designs while the black ones are usually plain and unfinished. The black ghaṛas are extremely light but very dense and have a huge sound. The shell tones ring in a bell-like fashion with much more of a sustain than the various South Indian ghaṭams (although the Mysore ghaṭam comes close). The bass tones of this instrument are very prominent. Since these instruments are fired at a much higher temperature for a longer time than South Indian ghaṭams, there is more consistency between instruments in terms of Western pitch. In other words, there is much less variation in the tuning when compared with ghaṭams from South India, which can range from a low B up to a high A chromatically. Ghaṛas/Matkas are usually found with a range from approximately C or C♯ to D (or slightly higher) although there does not seem to be any indication that these instruments are constructed with tuning considerations. Other spellings for matka include mutkay and madga.

== See also ==
- Udu
- Hang
- Cegléd water jug
