= L. Shankar discography =

L. Shankar has served as an instrumentalist, composer, record producer, arranger and programmer on several recordings. He has released a number of his own recordings, in addition to appearing on other artists' albums. All credits are for violin, except where noted. This is not an exhaustive list of Shankar's works, but a select few titles.

== Discography ==
=== Solo albums ===
- Violin Ecstasy (1978 - EMI)
- Touch Me There (1979—Zappa Records)
- Who's to Know (1980—ECM)
- Vision (1984—ECM)
- Song For Everyone (1985—ECM)
- Nobody Told Me (1989—ECM)
- Pancha Nadai Pallavi (1989—ECM)
- M.R.C.S. (1989—ECM)
- Soul Searcher (1990—Axiom/Island/PolyGram)
- Raga Aberi (1995—Music of the World)
- Enlightenment (Ganesh music)
- Eternal Light (2000—Moment! Records)
- Open the Door (2007—Big Deal/Rykodisc)
- In a Box (2012)
- The Revelation (2013)
- Champion (2014)
- Transcend (2015)
- Face to Face (2019)
- Chepleeri Dream (2020)
- Christmas from India (2021)
- Over The Stars (2024)
- Full Moon (2024)

=== DVDs ===
- Peter Gabriel's Secret World Live (1993)
- Shankar & Gingger's One In A Million (2001 · Silverline)

=== with T. Viswanathan and T. Ranganathan ===
- Pallavi: South Indian Flute Music (1973-Nonesuch)

=== with Shakti ===
- Shakti (1975—CBS)
- A Handful of Beauty (1976—CBS)
- Natural Elements (1977—CBS)

=== with The Epidemics ===
- The Epidemics (1986)
- Do What You Do (1987)
- Eye Catcher (1989)

=== as Shankar and Gingger ===
- Shankar & Gingger (2001)
- Celestial Body (2004 · Mondo Melodia)

=== Guest albums ===
- Archie Shepp's Attica Blues (1972) – Violin
- Clifford Thornton's Communication Network (1972) – Violin
- Amon Düül II's Wolf City (1972) – Tablas
- Egberto Gismonti's Circense (1979) – Violin
- Sérgio Dias's Sérgio Dias (1980) – Violin, songwriting credit
- Phil Collins' Face Value (1981) (as Shankar)

Song: "In The Air Tonight" (1981) – Violin, vocal effects
Song: "I Missed Again" (1981) – Violin
Song: "Droned" (1981) – Violins, Tamboura, "Voice Drums"

- Talking Heads's Speaking in Tongues (1983) – Violin
- Echo & the Bunnymen's Porcupine (1983) – Strings
- Lou Reed's New Sensations (1984) – Violin
- Narada Michael Walden's Nature of Things (1985) – Violin
- Artists United Against Apartheid's Sun City (1985) – Double violin
- Yoko Ono's Starpeace (1985) – Violin
- Public Image Ltd.’s Album/Compact disc/Cassette (1986) – Electric violin
- Ginger Baker's Horses & Trees (1986) – Violin
- Peter Gabriel's So (1986) – Violin
- Daryll Dobson's The Mind Electric (1986) – 10-string double violin
- The Pretenders' Get Close (1986) – Violin
- Trilok Gurtu's Usfret (1987) – Violin
- Charly García's Cómo conseguir chicas (1988) – Violin
- Gary Wright's Who I Am (1988) – Violin
- Animal Logic's Animal Logic (1989) – Violin
- Peter Gabriel's Passion: Music for The Last Temptation of Christ (1989) – Double violin, vocals, composer of "Open" (uncredited composer of additional music)
- Material's Seven Souls (1989) – Violin
- Swans' The Burning World (1989) – Violin
- Ryuichi Sakamoto's Beauty (1990) – Violin
- Maurice Jarre's Jacob's Ladder OST (1990) – Violin, vocals, performer, double violin
- Its Raining Men - Atlantic Records
- Jai Uttal's Footprints (1990) – Vocals
- Peter Gabriel's Us (1992) – Violin
- Yoko Ono's Walking on Thin Ice (1992) – Violin
- The Wailing Souls' All Over the World (1992) – Violin, sarod
- Frank Zappa's You Can't Do That on Stage Anymore, Vol. 6 (1992)

Song: "Thirteen" – Electric violin
Song: "Take Your Clothes Off When You Dance" – Electric violin

- Shadowfax's Esperanto (1992) – violin
- White Sands OST (1992) – Percussion, violin, vocals
- Adam Rudolph's Moving Pictures (1992) – Violin, vocals
- Peter Gabriel's Blood of Eden (US) (1993) – Violin
- Passion - Sources (1989) and (1993) – Violin, producer
- Mark O'Connor's Heroes (1993) – double violin, composer
- Fernando Saunder's Spin (1993) – Double violin
- SXL's Into the Outlands (1994) – Electric violin
- Peter Gabriel's Blood of Eden (UK) (1994) – Violin
- Peter Gabriel's Secret World Live (1994) – Violin, vocals
- Bill Laswell's Deconstruction: Celluloid Recordings (1994) – Violin
- Material's Hallucination Engine (1993) – Violin (Electric)
- Midge Ure's Breathe (1996) – Vocals, double violin
- Percy Ensemble Jones' Propeller Music (1996) – Violin
- Tony Levin's World Diary (1996) – Vocals, double violin
- Marianne Faithfull's Perfect Stranger: The Island Anthology (1998) – Double violin
- Saro Cosentino's One's & Zero's (1998) – Vocals, double violin
- Anthony Hindson and Friends' It's a Curious Life (1999) with Jack Bruce, Tony Williams, Zakir Hussain, Gary Husband and Scott Thunes – Violin
- Frank Zappa's Everything Is Healing Nicely (1999) – Violin
- Trilok Gurtu's African Fantasy (1999) – songwriting credit
- Warren Cuccurullo's The Blue (2000) – Violin
- Peter Gabriel's OVO (2000) – Violin, vocals
- Robin DiMaggio's Blue Planet (2001) – Violin, vocals, double violin
- Peter Murphy's Dust (2002) – Tabla, dholak
- Peter Gabriel's Long Walk Home: Music from the Rabbit-Proof Fence (2002) – Double violin
- Queen of the Damned: Music from the Motion Picture (2002) – Vocals, double violin
- Peter Gabriel's Up (2002) – Double violin
- Mercan Dede's Seyahatname (2003) – Dholak
- Phil May and the Fallen Angels' Fallen Angels (2003) – Violin
- Frank Zappa's Halloween (2003) – Violin
- The Passion of the Christ OST (2004) – Composer, vocals, double violin
- John McLaughlin's Guitar & Bass (2004) – Violin
- John McLaughlin's John McLaughlin's Montreux concerts (2004) – Violin, arranger
- Taufiq's Taalisma (2004) – Percussion, drums
- James Newton Howard's Hidalgo OST (2004) – Double violin
- Peter Gabriel's Play the Videos (2004) – Violin, double violin
- The Pretenders' Pirate Radio (2006) – Violin
- Sarah Green's Emergency (2006) – Vocals
- Chris Murphy's Luminous (2007) – Vocals
- Toto's Falling in Between (2006) (as Shenkar) – Vocals, violin
- Jonathan Davis and the SFA's Alone I Play (2007) – Violin
- The Human Abstract's Midheaven (2008) – Vocals
- Jonathan Davis's Black Labyrinth (2018) – Violin

=== Compilations / Box set appearances ===
- Best of Music & Rhythm (1983) – Violin, composer, vocals, producer
- ECM Spectrum, Vol. 1 (1987) – Violin, performer
- CMPler (1990) – Violin
- Peter Gabriel's Shaking the Tree (1990) – Double violin
- Pioneers of the New Age (1991) – Violin
- Illuminations: An Axiom Compilation (1991) – Arranger, vocals, kanjira, producer, double violin
- Yoko Ono's Onobox (1992) – Violin
- Lou Reed's Between Thought and Expression: The Lou Reed Anthology (1992) – Electric violin
- Plus from Us (1993) – Arranger, vocals, kanjira, producer, double violin
- Manifestation Axiom Collection 2 (1993) – Arranger
- The Best of Shakti (1994)
- Narada Michael Walden's Ecstasy's Dance: The Best of Narada (1996) – Violin
- John McLaughlin's This is Jazz Vol. 17 (1996) – Violin
- Phil Collins's Hits (1998) – Violin
- Jewels of the Subcontinent (2000) – Performer, double violin
- Asian Travels, Vol. 1: A Six Degrees Collection (2000) – Performer
- Echo & the Bunnymen's Crystal Days: 1979–1999 (2001) – Strings
- The Bombay Jazz Palace (2001) – Violin
- Meta Collection (2002) – Violin
- Asana: Soul Practice (2002) – Violin, arranger
- Classical Indian Collection (2003) – Violin
- Bhakti Music: Medicine Buddha (2003) – Photography
- Talking Heads' Once in a Lifetime (2003) – Violin
- Left of the Dial: Dispatches of the '80s Underground (2004) – Strings
- Phil Collins's The Platinum Collection (2004) – Violin, tamboura
- Trilok Gurtu Collection (2005) – Violin
- Monterey Pop Festival (2007) – Arranger
- John McLaughlin's Essential John McLaughlin (2007) – Violin
