= One in a Million =

One in a Million may refer to:

== Film ==
- One in a Million (1934 film), a film starring Dorothy Wilson
- One in a Million (1936 film), a film starring Sonja Henie
- One in a Million: The Ron LeFlore Story, a 1978 television film
- One in a Million, a 1995 Swedish film by Måns Herngren and Hannes Holm
- One in a Mill10n, a 2025 documentary film about South Korean girl group Twice

== Music ==
- One in a Million (band), a 1960s Scottish psychedelic group featuring Jimmy McCulloch
- One in a Million, a 2001 DVD by L. Shankar and Gingger

=== Albums ===
- One in a Million (Aaliyah album) or the title song (see below), 1996
- One in a Million (Big Country album) or the title song, 2001
- One in a Million (Bosson album) or the title song (see below), 2002
- One in a Million (Matoma album) or the title song, 2018

=== Songs ===
- "One in a Million" (Aaliyah song), 1996
- "One in a Million" (Bebe Rexha and David Guetta song), 2023
- "One in a Million" (Bosson song), 2000
- "One in a Million" (Drumsound & Bassline Smith song), 2013
- "One in a Million" (Euphoria song), 1992
- "One in a Million" (Guns N' Roses song), 1988
- "One in a Million" (Johnny Lee song), 1980
- "One in a Million" (Ne-Yo song), 2010
- "One in a Million" (Pete Rock & CL Smooth song), 1993
- "One in a Million" (Pink Floyd song), 1967
- "One in a Million" (Sandy Mölling song), 2004, covered by Miley Cyrus (2007, as Hannah Montana)
- "One in a Million" (Trixter song), 1991
- "One in a Million", by Backstreet Boys from Unbreakable, 2007
- "One in a Million", by Bodyjar from Plastic Skies, 2002
- "One in a Million", by Chris Wood and Hugh Lupton
- "One in a Million", by Christine McVie from Christine McVie, 1984
- "One in a Million", by Down with Webster, 2013
- "One in a Million", by Gotthard from Human Zoo, 2003
- "One in a Million", by Hilary Duff from Breathe In. Breathe Out., 2015
- "One in a Million", by Ken-Y of R.K.M & Ken-Y, 2009
- "One in a 1,000,000", by Lene Lovich from Stateless, 1978
- "One in a Million", by Level 42 from Forever Now, 1994
- "One in a Million", by Matt Brouwer from Till the Sunrise, 2012
- "One in a Million", by the Mighty Lemon Drops from Laughter, 1989
- "One in a Million", by Modern Talking from The 1st Album, 1985
- "One in a Million", by Monty Are I, 2009
- "One in a Million", by Nerve, featuring JK-47, 2021
- "One in a Million", by Pet Shop Boys from Very, 1993
- "One in a Million", by the Platters, 1956
- "One in a Million", by ReConnected, 2013
- "One in a Million", by the Romantics from In Heat, 1983
- "One in a Million", by Samantha Fox from I Wanna Have Some Fun, 1988
- "One in a Million", by Swiss from the soundtrack of StreetDance 3D
- "One in a Million", by Tomohisa Yamashita, 2010
- "One in a Million", by Twice from Twicecoaster: Lane 1, 2016

== Television ==
- One in a Million (American TV series), a 1980 sitcom starring Shirley Hemphill
- One in a Million (Malaysian TV series), a 2006–2009 singing competition show
- One in a Million, a 1967 American game show produced by Merv Griffin Enterprises
- "One in a Million", an episode of The Proud Family
- One in a Million, a 2008 DVD release of Hannah Montana episodes
- One in a Million, an ITV series about real-life unlikely coincidences, presented by Phillip Schofield

== Other uses ==
- One in a Million: A Memoir, a 2001 autobiography by Mary G. Clark
- One in a Million (horse) (1976–1992), a British Thoroughbred racehorse

== See also ==
- "A Million to One", a 1960 song by Jimmy Charles
- "One in a Million You", a 1980 song by Larry Graham
- Aayirathil Oruvan (disambiguation) (lit. 'One in a Thousand'), various Indian films
