= Aayirathil Oruvan =

Aayirathil Oruvan (lit. 'One in a Thousand') may refer to these Indian films:

- Aayirathil Oruvan (1965 film), a Tamil film directed by B. R. Panthulu
- Aayirathil Oruvan (2009 film), a Malayalam film directed by Sibi Malayil
- Aayirathil Oruvan (2010 film), a Tamil film directed by Selvaraghavan

== See also ==
- One in a Million (disambiguation)
