= Human Era (album) =

Studio album by Trixter
- Released: June 5, 2015
- Recorded: 2015
- Genre: Hard rock
- Length: 43:42
- Label: Frontiers Records
- Producer: Steve Brown

Trixter chronology
New Audio Machine (2012)	Human Era (2015)

Human Era is the fourth studio album from American rock band Trixter. It was released on June 5, 2015, on Frontiers Records. A video for the song "Human Era" was released on June 25, 2015.

== Track listing ==
1. "Rockin' to the Edge of the Night"
2. "Crash That Party"
3. "Not Like All the Rest"
4. "For You"
5. "Every Second Counts"
6. "Beats Me Up"
7. "Good Times Now"
8. "Midnight in Your Eyes"
9. "All Night Long"
10. "Soul of a Lovin' Man"
11. "Human Era"
12. "Always a Victim" (acoustic version – bonus track iTunes)
13. "Road of a Thousand Dreams" (re-recorded version – bonus track iTunes)

== Personnel ==
- Pete Loran (lead vocals/rhythm guitar)
- Steve Brown (lead guitar/harmonica/backing vocals)
- P.J. Farley (bass/backing vocals)
- Gus Scott (drums/percussion/backing vocals)
