= Double violin =

Ten-string instrument

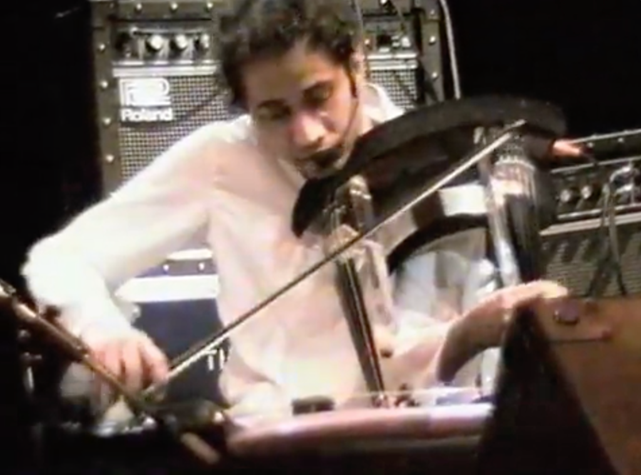
L. Shankar on the double violin, 1990

The Double Violin is a ten-string, stereophonic double-necked electric violin invented by violinist L. Shankar. It is also referred to as the LSD or L. Shankar's Double Violin.

== Description ==
The double violin is capable of replicating a full orchestra's effect with the lower neck covering the double bass and cello range, and the upper neck generating treble sounds; the violin and viola. In addition to providing a wide range of 11 octaves (5 ½ octaves on each neck), playing on one neck produces a sympathetic resonance effect on the other. The horizontal rib can be positioned beneath the chin or supported against the chest (Indian style) while playing. Due to the instrument's greater angle, the bowing was different and Shankar incorporated new techniques including playing on both necks simultaneously.

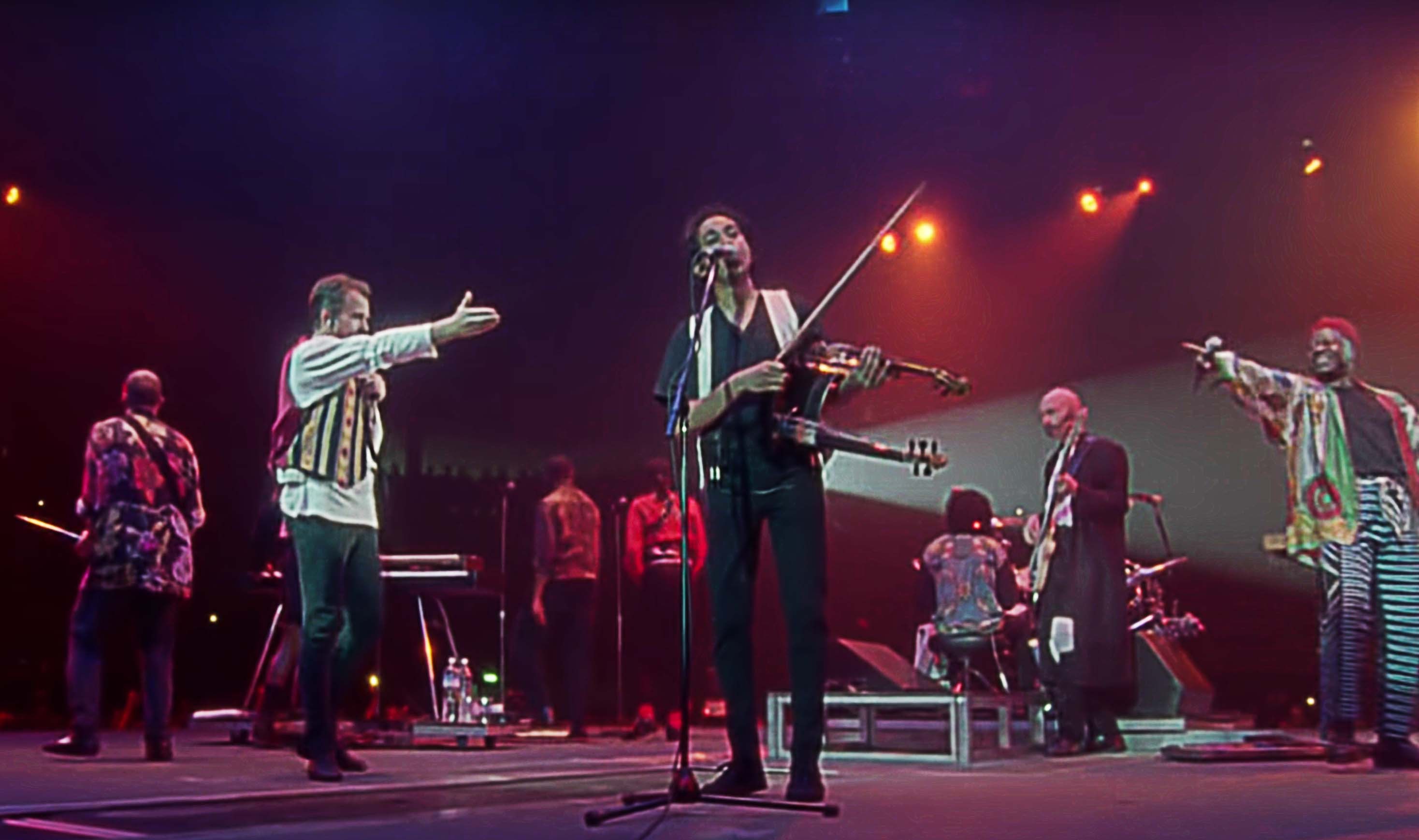
L. Shankar's performance of 'In Your Eyes' from Peter Gabriel's 'Secret World Live' concert (1993) with the double violin.

The concept for the double violin originated in 1978, after producing his album by Zappa Records where Shankar had to overdub a wide range of string instruments as he was unable to find session musicians who could render the Indian ornaments and styles he wanted. He made a prototype with cardboard and spent about a year and a half improving the design.

To date, Shankar has commissioned four different versions of the double violin, the first made by Ken Parker of Stuyvesant Sound in New York and the latest edition crafted by luthier John Jordan and released in 2023.
