= The Passion of the Christ (soundtrack) =

Film score by John Debney
- Released: February 24, 2004
- Recorded: October 2003–January 2004
- Studios: Orchestra recorded at Air Studios, Lyndhurst Hall London.; Choir recorded at Abbey Road Studios, London.; Musical score mixed at O'Henry Sound Studios.
- Genres: Film soundtrack, World
- Length: 54:09
- Label: Sony Music/Integrity Music

John Debney chronology
Welcome to Mooseport	The Passion of the Christ	The Whole Ten Yards

The Passion of the Christ is the soundtrack, on the Sony label, of the 2004 Academy Award-nominated film The Passion of the Christ starring James Caviezel, Maia Morgenstern and Monica Bellucci. The original score was composed by John Debney and conducted by Nick Ingman, with additional music by Jack Lenz. The album was nominated for the Academy Award for Best Original Score.

Mel Gibson, the director for The Passion of the Christ, has sung in part of the soundtrack. Various other artists worked on the score, such as, Ron Allen (instruments), Shannon Kingsbury (vocals), Tanya Tsarouska (vocal solos), Aaron Martin (vocals and synth programmer), Lisbeth Scott (lyrics and vocal coaching), Chris Bleth (instruments), Ahmed El-Eshmer (vocals), Pedro Eustache (instruments), Lakshminarayana Shankar (vocals and instruments) and Gingger Shankar (vocals and instruments).

== Development ==
=== Rejected composers ===
James Horner and Rachel Portman were rumored to compose the film's score. Mel Gibson first chose Canadian composer Jack Lenz to write the film's score, who began working on the project from September 2002. Lenz described the procedure as "completely uncommon" because "[composers are] usually the last people they call". While the film was in production, Lenz toured the Middle East to gather field recordings from different musicians in search of the "organic" sound that Gibson desired. Lenz scored eight CDs of original music, where he handed Gibson an additional 20 CDs of field recordings. Gibson was happy with Lenz's musical selection, though he struggled to express what he was looking for specifically. Furthermore, Gibson had also brought in Australian musician Lisa Gerrard to score the film, although her music was not used in the film.

In October 2003, Gibson hired John Debney to score the film. Lenz responded, "I assumed I would be the only [composer], especially with the amount of research and time I was putting in and how well he was responding to the material. But it's Hollywood, and I call it 'baptism by fire'". In the final score however, Gibson did implement around 20 minutes of additional music by Lenz. Gibson was impressed with how Lenz handled the arduous situation and pointed out that he will work with Lenz in the future.

=== John Debney ===
Debney, being a devout Catholic, was excited to compose the film's score, stating, "I just about fell off of my chair, because I had already heard a lot about the film over the previous few months...I offered to write some music because, being a life-long Catholic, that this is sort of dream come true. I wrote some music over a weekend...He [Gibson] heard the music I was writing and liked the direction I was going." Debney wrote around 80 to 90 minutes of music for the film. Debney was influenced by Peter Gabriel's The Last Temptation of Christ score.

To avoid getting fired, Debney took a balanced approach on the film's score, stating, "I did know that the filmmakers liked an eclectic approach to the music, not wanting to make the score too literal or conventional. The result, I believe, is a nice blend between some very powerful, more traditional music, as well as some very interesting ethnic and contemporary textures." During his work on the film, Debney stated, "What I was trying to do with the music was to write first of all the best that I could write and try to be true to the period, so I tried to utilize instruments from the period so there are a lot of ancient instruments in the music." He continues, "my studio is a lovely room and I have a work station with my keyboard...So that when Mel Gibson comes and sits in the room, he will hear a piece of music that is fully orchestrated; it's synthesized orchestrated. He'll hear the oboe, and then the clarinet and the strings, and so literally, I am composing note for note; instrument for instrument".

Mel Gibson sang a part on the track “Judas Hangs Himself”. Vocalist Lisbeth Scott sings for Mary with sorrow in her voice. Instruments such as a duduk, double violin, bamboo flute, cello, Spanish dulzaina, oud and erhu are used occasionally in “The Olive Garden”, “Judas Hangs Himself”, “Pilate's Truth” and “Song of Complaint”. A percussion section was used during suspenseful scenes, with the erhu representing Satan.

== Reception ==
Professional ratings
Review scores
Source	Rating
AllMusic	4/5 stars
Empire	4/5 stars
Filmtracks	4/5 stars
Movie Wave	4.5/5 stars
ScoreNotes	B-
SoundtrackNet	4/5 stars

Thom Jurek from Allmusic.com, who gave the score 4 out of 5, described the album as "a stunner, one that will offer those who choose to encounter it a far-reaching and deeply affective listening experience that is as aesthetically beautiful and unsettling as it is evocatively familiar."

James Southall from Movie-Wave.net praised the composer and the album, giving it 4 and a half stars out of 5, stating, "I would refute any allegation of the music being dreary or depressing: it clearly has to convey a certain atmosphere, but it does so with beauty and, well, passion", where he concludes, "Shades of Gladiator and The Last Temptation of Christ there may be, but this is quite obviously music coming straight from Debney's heart, and The Passion of the Christ is a wonderful album."

Dan Goldwasser from Soundtrack.net gave the score 4 out of 5 stars, stating the score was "the most successful soundtrack album since Titanic...John Debney's score is filled with ethnic percussion and instruments, vocal chanting, and a rather classical 'biblical epic' sensibility...", before adding, "his work [Debney] on The Passion of the Christ is easily some of his best work in recent years."

Filmtracks critiqued, "there are parts of The Passion of the Christ that sound like they were inspired by The Prince of Egypt in instrumentation, although the pounding action cues seem better compared to Hans Zimmer's Gladiator", before adding "when awe is necessary, Debney's score is immense, even during dialogue-respecting underscore that often features a distant, powerfully beating drum and a rumbling cymbal to accentuate each pivotal statement by Jesus himself." Filmtracks then criticised the score, stating that it has "a disappointing lack of consistent melodic development...there are no overwhelming, central thematic identities in the film," besides the Resurrection theme heard at the end of the film. The review then concluded that the music "is the king of religious cliché, utilizing the exact bloated sound that even Gibson had originally attempted to avoid."

== Track listing ==
Gingger Shankar and Lakshminarayana Shankar performed the vocals in the tracks. Lisbeth Scott performed vocals and wrote the lyrics for "Mary Goes To Jesus". Jack Lenz provided additional music.

No.	Title	Performer(s)	Length
1.	"The Olive Garden"	John Debney, Jack Lenz, Lisbeth Scott	1:56
2.	"Bearing the Cross"	John Debney and Lisbeth Scott	3:42
3.	"Jesus Arrested"	John Debney, Lisbeth Scott, Gingger Shankar, Lakshminarayana Shankar	4:37
4.	"Peter Denies Jesus"	John Debney and Lisbeth Scott	1:58
5.	"The Stoning"	John Debney, Gingger Shankar, Lakshminarayana Shankar	2:25
6.	"Song of Complaint"	John Debney, Traditional	1:33
7.	"Simon Is Dismissed"	John Debney and Lisbeth Scott	2:25
8.	"Flagellation/Dark Choir/Disciples"	John Debney, Jack Lenz, Lisbeth Scott, Gingger Shankar, Lakshminarayana Shankar	5:54
9.	"Mary Goes to Jesus"	John Debney and Lisbeth Scott	2:47
10.	"Peaceful But Primitive/Procession"	John Debney, Jack Lenz, Lisbeth Scott	3:36
11.	"Crucifixion"	John Debney, Lisbeth Scott, Gingger Shankar, Lakshminarayana Shankar	7:38
12.	"Raising the Cross"	John Debney and Lisbeth Scott	2:13
13.	"It Is Done"	John Debney and Jack Lenz	3:37
14.	"Jesus Is Carried Down"	John Debney and Lisbeth Scott	4:39
15.	"Resurrection"	John Debney, Lisbeth Scott, Gingger Shankar, Lakshminarayana Shankar	5:03
Total length:			54:09

== Awards ==
On 2005, the album won a Dove Award for Instrumental Album of the Year at the 36th GMA Dove Awards.

The album was also nominated for the Academy Award for Best Original Score at the 77th Academy Awards (2004), where it lost to Finding Neverland by Jan A. P. Kaczmarek.

== Certifications ==
Region	Certification	Certified units/sales
United States (RIAA)	Gold	500,000^{^}
^{^} Shipments figures based on certification alone.
