= Raga Aberi =

Studio album by L. Shankar
- Released: 1995
- Studio: Syntasy
- Label: Music of the World
- Producer: L. Shankar, the Epidemics

L. Shankar chronology
Soul Searcher (1990)	Raga Aberi (1995)	Enlightenment (1999)

Raga Aberi is an album by the Indian musician L. Shankar, released in 1995. He is accompanied by Zakir Hussain on tabla and Vikku Vinayakram on ghatam. The album was nominated for a Grammy Award for "Best World Music Album".

== Production ==
Produced by Shankar and the Epidemics, the album was recorded at Syntasy Studios, San Francisco. Shankar's wife, Caroline, played the tamboura drone. Shankar employed the ragam tanam pallavi form on Raga Aberi. He played a 10-string double violin.

== Critical reception ==
Professional ratings
Review scores
Source	Rating
AllMusic	4.5/5 stars
MusicHound World: The Essential Album Guide	3.5/5 stars
The Republican	3.5/5 stars

The Edmonton Journal wrote that, "if [Shankar]'s one to wear his heart on his sleeve (especially in the opening solo rangam) it's not without careful attention to an almost mystical level of technique, or the considerable intellectual complexity he spins in interacting with the percussionists during the later parts of the raga." The Republican determined that "Shankar not only plays with breathtaking speed, he's also mastered the art of dynamics, letting the instrument breathe and taking advantage of the violin's full tonal qualities." Billboard called the album "masterful."

AllMusic wrote that "the energy is consistently high, and there are a lot of solos by each musician, as well as deftly coordinated unison passages." In 1999, Dirty Linen called "Raga Aberi" the highlight of the India – Jewels of the Subcontinent compilation, writing that it "features some dazzling percussion interplay and a double konnakol break."

== Track listing ==
No.	Title	Length
1.	"Raga Aberi: Tanam"
2.	"Raga Aberi: Beginning Pallavi"
3.	"Raga Aberi: Middle Pallavi"
4.	"Raga Aberi: Percussion Improv"
5.	"Raga Aberi: Percussion Section + Finale"
6.	"Raga Aberi: Entire Percussion Section Plus Finale"
7.	"Raga Aberi"

== Credits ==
- Double Violin – Shankar
- Engineer – Bernard Xolotl
- Ghatam – Vikku Vinayakram
- Producer – The Epidemics
- Tabla – Zakir Hussain
- Tamboura – Caroline
