= Phonogram Inc. =

American record company

- Predecessor: Philips Records
- Founded: 1970
- Defunct: 1997
- Successor: PolyGram
- Headquarters: Netherlands
- Parent: PolyGram

Phonogram Incorporated was started in 1970 as a successor to Philips Phonographic Industries, a unit of the Grammophon-Philips Group (GPG), a joint venture of Philips N.V. of the Netherlands and Siemens AG of Germany. It was a holding company for labels which owned record labels such as Philips, Fontana, Vertigo and Mercury and distributed many other licensed labels.

== History ==
In 1972, Grammophon-Philips Group was reorganized as The PolyGram Group. Following PolyGram's acquisition of Mercury in the United States, the corporate name was changed from Mercury Record Productions, Inc., to Phonogram, Inc. In the U.S. Phonogram artists were generally released on Mercury Records, but the label is independent from its U.K. counterpart. By 1982, Mercury and all other PolyGram owned labels including, RSO, Polydor, Total Experience and Casablanca carried the following wording "Manufactured And Marketed by PolyGram Records" with the PolyGram Records logo.

In the United Kingdom, Phonogram was the holding company for Philips Records, which was established in 1953 and also launched the Fontana label in 1958. As well as producing their own recordings many of which became U.K. hits, Philips/Fontana licensed the rights from Columbia Records (U.S.) to release and distribute their product from 1953 until the end of 1964. After that time, Columbia U.S. set up their own marketing and production unit in the UK in Theobalds Road, London, having acquired Oriole Records and its record-pressing plant that had prospered in manufacturing discs for U.K. budget labels including Embassy, sold through Woolworths. U.S. Columbia was unable to use the "Columbia" trademark outside the United States and Canada as it had already been trademarked overseas by EMI. Therefore, U.S. Columbia product was released in most territories on the CBS record label.

In 1977, Frank Zappa negotiated a distribution agreement with Phonogram for his Zappa Records label. Due to legal pressure from Zappa's previous distributor Warner Bros. Records, Zappa and Phonogram were forced to shelve a planned four-LP box set called Läther (pronounced "Leather".) Phonogram did distribute three Zappa albums in the US and Canada, but the agreement ended in 1980. According to Zappa, this was because a Phonogram executive objected to the lyrics of a Zappa single titled "I Don't Wanna Get Drafted". Phonogram president Robert Sherwood disputed Zappa's version of the story, insisting that they did not want to release a single without the support of a full-length album.

Releases in Europe were issued by Vertigo and Philips and carried the "Marketed by Phonogram" wording with the Phonogram logo. Phonogram also licensed recordings from small U.S. record labels for European release. Among these were Avco, Sire, Janus, Westbound, All Platinum, and Chess.

== De-establishment ==
In 1997, all PolyGram units still using the Phonogram name moved to Mercury Records whom by that time, had become PolyGram's flagship label. PolyGram continued until 1998, when the company was purchased by Seagram and merged with Universal Music Group.

== See also ==
- Lists of record labels
