= Who's to Know =

Studio album by Shankar
- Released: 1981
- Recorded: November 1980
- Studio: Tonstudio Bauer; Ludwigsburg, West Germany
- Genre: Carnatic music
- Length: 45:56
- Label: ECM 1195
- Producer: Manfred Eicher

Shankar chronology
Touch Me There (1979)	Who's to Know (1981)	Vision (1983)

Who's to Know is the second studio album by violinist Shankar, recorded in November 1980 and released on ECM the following year. The trio features percussionists Umayalpuram K. Sivaraman and Zakir Hussain.

== Reception ==
The AllMusic review by Stephen Cook awarded the album 4½ stars stating "For this 1980 session, the violinist focuses on the traditional ragas of his native India, with two extended pieces... On the first raga (both pieces here are reconfigurations of traditional ragas), he moves from a meditative solo stretch to some frenetic interplay with Hussein, eventually ending the piece with an incredible, lightning-fast display of technique. The group opt for a more even-keeled pace on the second raga. Shankar is impressive again, while Hussein makes the best of some lengthy solo spots. An essential disc for L. Shankar fans".

Professional ratings
Review scores
Source	Rating
AllMusic	4.5/5 stars
The Rolling Stone Jazz Record Guide	4/5 stars

== Track listing ==
All compositions by Shankar

1. "Ragam Tanam Pallavi" - 22:11
2. "Ananda Nadamadum Tillai Sankara" - 23:45

== Personnel ==
- Shankar – 10-string double violin, tamboura
- Umayalpuram K. Sivaraman – mridangam
- Zakir Hussain – tabla
- V. Lakshminarayana – conductor (tala keeping)
