= Trixter =

American rock band

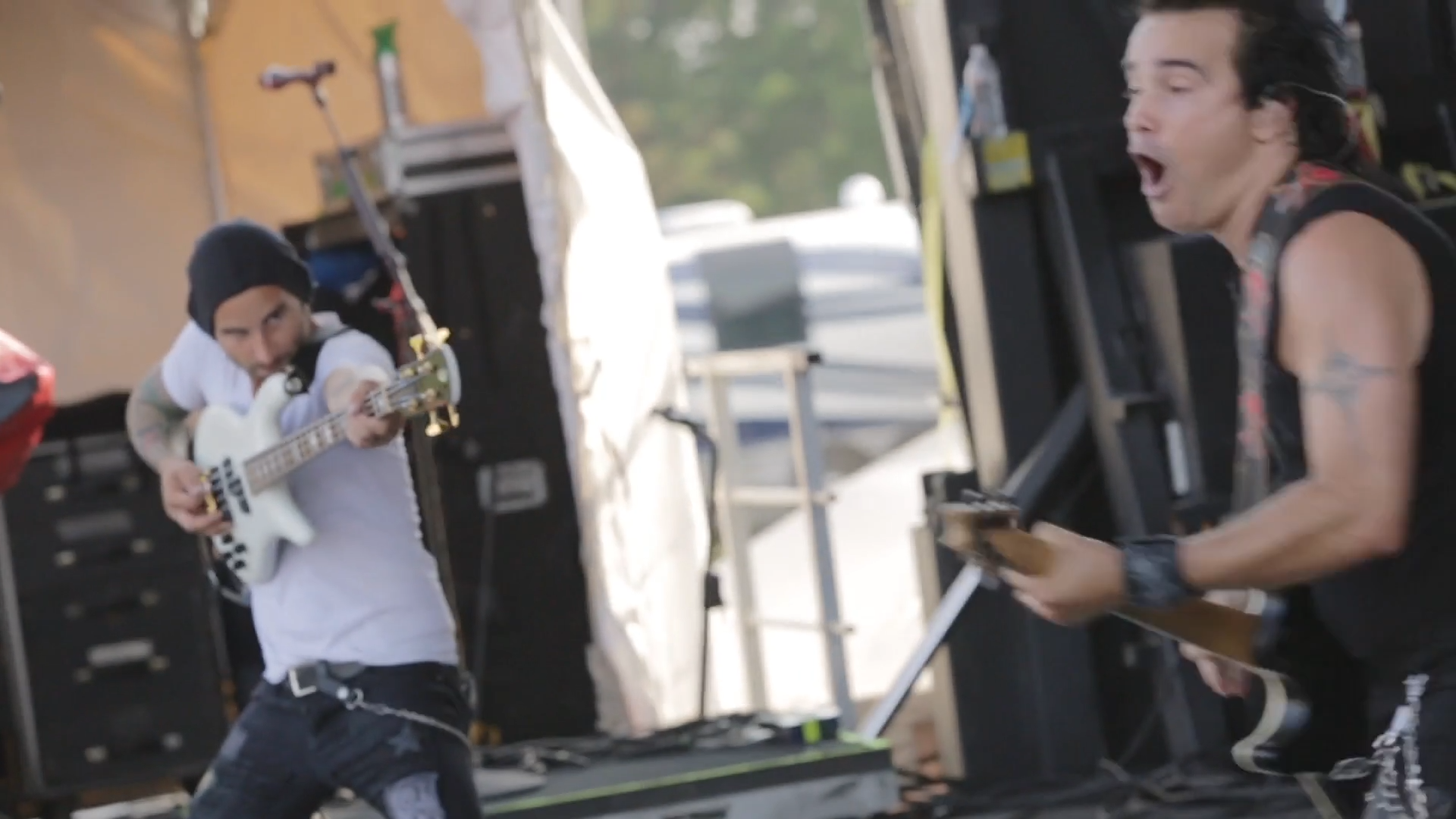
- P.J. Farley and Steve Brown performing with Trixter at Farm Rock 2015

Background information
- Origin: Paramus, New Jersey, U.S.
- Genres: Hard rock; glam metal
- Years active: 1983–1997; 2007–2017; 2021–present
- Labels: MCA; Backstreet; Frontiers
- Members: Steve Brown; P. J. Farley; Ben Hans
- Past members: Pete Loran; Dougie C.; Michael "Mike" Luciano; Mark "Gus" Scott
- Website: trixterrocks.com

Trixter is an American hard rock band formed in 1983 in Paramus, New Jersey. The band gained popularity in the early 1990s with hits like "Give It to Me Good" that peaked at number 65 on the Billboard Hot 100 in 1990 and "One in a Million". Despite lineup changes and a hiatus in the late 90s, Trixter has maintained a presence in the rock scene through tours and occasional album releases.

== Career ==
=== Early years ===
Trixter was formed in June 1983 in Paramus, New Jersey by Steve Brown (who was then twelve years old) and Doug "Dougie C." Cowie. Originally known as Rade, Brown and Cowie, they added drummer Mike Pane, and later singer Pete Loran to round out the lineup. After a single concert, Pane was replaced with Mark "Gus" Scott, and the band changed its name to Trixter. By 1986, Trixter was a constant fixture on the concert scene, quickly growing a fan base on the strength of their live shows. By 1987, Trixter was performing to sold-out crowds, playing with acts like Kix and Skid Row. In addition to their live success, the band found themselves being courted by several major record labels. In 1988, Trixter began recording at Bear Tracks Studios in New York with engineer Nelson Ayers, most notable for recording Guns N' Roses' Appetite for Destruction, on what was intended to become their first studio album titled "Just Having Fun". The album was never released, and in November 1988, founding member Dougie C. was replaced with local bassist PJ Farley. In May 1989, the band landed a deal with MCA Records.

=== Debut album and tour ===
In September 1989, the band went to Hollywood to record their debut album with producer Bill Wray. Songs from the 1988 recording session including "Ride the Whip" and "Only Young Once" made it to the new album. Trixter was released in May 1990 with the song "Line of Fire" as the single for rock radio. The song slowly climbed the charts, reaching No. 1 on Z-Rocks Top 100 by July 1990. Along with the release of the album, Trixter also filmed their first video for the song "Give It to Me Good". In September, the band headed out on a nationwide tour and after two weeks they landed the opening slot for Stryper. In mid-October, Trixter joined Don Dokken for another tour around the USA. It was on this tour that MTV added the video for "Give It to Me Good". Within one week, the video was No.1 on the Dial MTV top ten video countdown. The video stayed No.1 for five weeks straight.

In December 1990, Trixter filmed the video for the second single, "One in a Million", at a sold-out show in Rockland County, New York. The band also recorded a song, "One Mo Time", for the film If Looks Could Kill. The song featured Edgar Winter on saxophone. By January 1991, the record was selling 20,000 units per week. The video for "One in a Million" went No.1 on MTV for three weeks. The album peaked at No.28 on Billboard's Top 200 Album chart, and the single for "Give it to Me Good" was a Top 50 hit on Billboard's Top 100 Singles chart. Trixter did their first-ever arena shows opening for Poison and then headed out on a five-month North American tour with the German rockers Scorpions. In February, the band flew to Daytona, Florida to do MTV Spring Break, and their debut album went Gold soon after. In April 1991, Trixter played their hometown Meadowlands Arena, where they were presented with gold albums at a special after-show party. In May, they filmed the video for the third single, "Surrender". In June 1991, Trixter started the "Blood, Sweat & Beers" tour with Warrant and FireHouse. Around this time, the popular rock magazine Metal Edge dedicated an entire issue to the band, "The Trixter Color Spectacular". The video and single for "Surrender" were released and once again the video went to No.1 on MTV for two weeks and the single went Top 100 in Billboard.

In September 1991, the Blood, Sweat & Beers tour was filmed for a pay-per-view special. October marked the end of the Trixter touring cycle for the debut album. In January 1992, Trixter began pre-production on their second album. Also during that time, the band renegotiated their record deal and were signed directly to MCA Records. Trixter chose James "Jimbo" Barton of Rush and Queensrÿche fame to produce. Recording for the new album, Hear!, was from April to August 1992.

=== Second album and later years ===
The band's second album, Hear!, was released in October 1992 and Trixter began a second North American tour, opening for Kiss. "Road of a Thousand Dreams" was released as a radio single. In January 1993, they shot a video for the next single, "Rockin Horse", and began a headlining club tour called The "Hear Club for Men" tour. Hear! did well in Japan, so the band was invited over to do two shows: One in Osaka at Moda Hall and the second in Kawasaki at Club Citta. Trixter finished the Hear! tour in late June 1993 at Milwaukee's Summerfest.

Hear! failed to capture the attention of the MTV audience, as the Seattle grunge movement had all but killed the market for Trixter's outdated style of 80s pop metal. This led to the band being dropped by MCA Records and their management severing ties.

In 1994, the band recorded the Undercovers EP in Steve Brown's home studio. This was a CD of all cover songs that was released in October 1994 on the indie label Backstreet Records.

In 1999, the band was featured on VH-1's Where Are They Now and in 2000 they were voted No.29 on VH-1's Top 40 Hair Band Countdown.

=== Reuniting for the Give It to You Good tour ===
Steve Brown announced on December 1, 2007, that Trixter would be reuniting in 2008 for the Give It to You Good tour. In 2008, Pete Loran called the 2 Music Geeks and discussed Trixter's 2008 touring plans and the production of a new live album. The reunited Trixter played a total of five dates in 2008, beginning with an appearance at the Rocklahoma festival in July and ending with a sold-out headlining performance in November, their first hometown NJ show in over 13 years. On March 27, 2009, Trixter performed at the Crazy Donkey in Farmingdale, New York. Trixter released a new album in 2012 called New Audio Machine.

After thirteen years, 2008 had all the members of the "classic" lineup on the worldwide concert circuit once again. Since reforming the band has released Alive in Japan, a live concert CD featuring two new songs and a Best Of CD with all the hits remastered. On November 28, 2008, Trixter returned home to New Jersey for a homecoming show at Dexter's Entertainment Complex in Riverdale, New Jersey. Trixter also appeared on the cover of the EC Rocker magazine along with a feature story in North Jersey's biggest newspaper, The Record. On February 20, 2009, Trixter and Dokken sold out The Grizzly Rose in Denver, Colorado.

In 2016, it was disclosed that Trixter would appear at the three-day Rockingham 2016 melodic/hard rock festival, held in Nottingham, England. They headlined on Friday, October 21.

== Band members ==
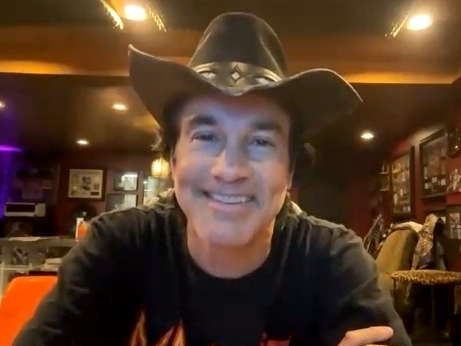
Steve Brown

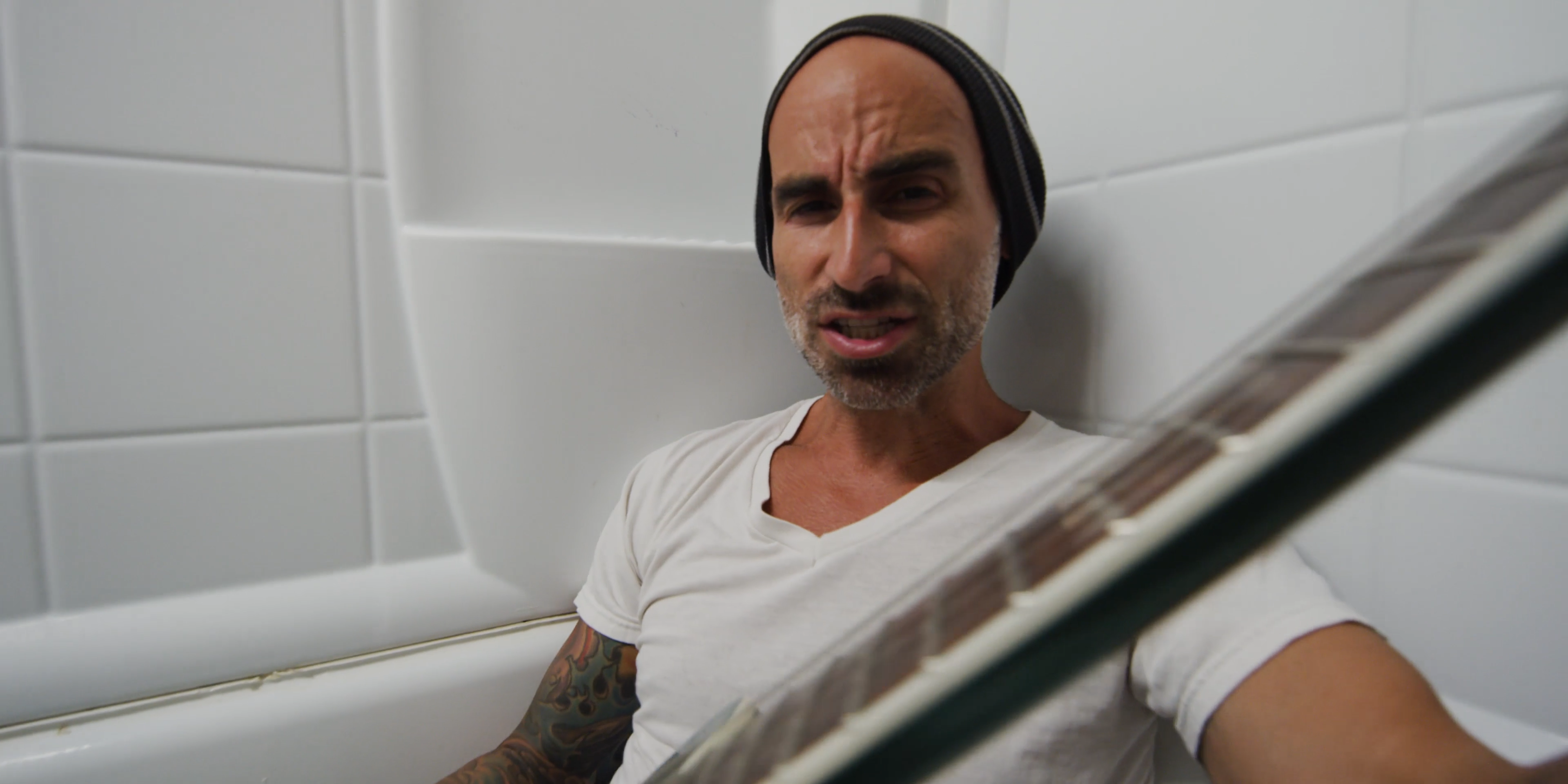
P.J. Farley

=== Current members ===
- Steve Brown – lead guitar, harmonica (1983–1995, 2007–2017, 2021–present), lead vocals, rhythm guitar (2021–present), backing vocals (1983–1995, 2007–2017)
- P. J. Farley – bass guitar, backing vocals (1988–1995, 2007–2017, 2021–present)
- Ben Hans – drums, percussion (2021–present)

=== Former members ===
- Pete Loran – lead vocals, rhythm guitar (1983–1995, 2007–2017)
- Douglas "Dougie C." Cowie – bass guitar, backing vocals (1983–1988)
- Mike Pane – drums (1983–1984)
- Mark "Gus" Scott – drums, percussion, backing vocals (1984–1995, 2007–2017)
- Tom Coombs – drums, percussion, backing vocals (1995)
- Michael "Mike" Luciano (Bob Feldman) – drums, percussion, backing vocals (1995)
- Jamie "Animal" Dimare – bass guitar

=== Touring substitutes ===
- John Allen III – lead guitar, backing vocals (2014)
- Billy Morris – lead guitar, backing vocals (2016)

=== Session members ===
- Liad Cohen – keyboards on Trixter and Hear! (1992 – multiple tracks)
- Edgar Winter – saxophone on If Looks Could Kill (1990–1991 – track "One Mo Time")
- Kevin Leahy – drums

== Discography ==
=== Studio albums ===
Title	Album details	Chart Positions	Certification	Sales
Title	Album details	US	Certification	Sales
Trixter	Released: May 1990; Label: MCA; Formats: CD, CS, LP, DL	28	RIAA: Gold	US: 500,000
Hear!	Released: October 13, 1992; Label: MCA; Formats: CD, CS, LP, DL	109		US: 100,000
Undercovers	Released: November 15, 1994; Label: Backstreet; Formats: CD, CS, DL	—		
New Audio Machine	Released: April 24, 2012; Label: Frontiers; Formats: CD, DL	—		
Human Era	Released: June 5, 2015; Label: Frontiers; Formats: CD, DL	—		

=== Live albums ===
Title	Album details
Alive in Japan	Released: 2008; Label: Mojo Vegas; Formats: CD, DL

=== Compilation albums ===
Title	Album details
Best of Trixter	Released: 2009; Label: Mojo Vegas; Formats: CD, DL

=== Compilation appearances ===
- If Looks Could Kill (1991)
- Nintendo: White Knuckle Scorin' (1991)
- Hard Love (1994)
- Glam Rock Vol. 2 (1998)
- Rock of the 80s (1998)

=== Singles ===
Year	Song	Peak chart positions		Album
Year	Song	US	US Main. Rock	Album
1990	"Give It to Me Good"	65	26	Trixter
1991	"One in a Million"	75	33	Trixter
1991	"Surrender"	72	—	Trixter
1992	"Road of a Thousand Dreams"	—	—	Hear!
1992	"Rockin' Horse"	—	—	Hear!
"—" denotes a recording that did not chart
