= New Audio Machine =

Studio album by Trixter
- Released: April 24, 2012 (US)
- Recorded: 2011
- Genre: Hard rock
- Label: Frontiers Records
- Producer: Steve Brown, Chuck Alzakian

Trixter chronology
Undercovers (1994)	New Audio Machine (2012)	Human Era (2015)

New Audio Machine is an album by American rock band Trixter. It was released in April 2012 on Frontiers Records. The album features the original lineup of the band. "Tattoos & Misery" was released as the first single and video in March 2012.

It was rated a "B" by Classic Rock Revisited.

== Track listing ==
1. "Drag Me Down" – 3:59 (Steve Brown, Glen Burtnik)
2. "Get On It" – 3:36 (Brown)
3. "Dirty Love" – 3:41 (Brown, Pete Loran, Jim DeSalvo)
4. "Machine" – 3:34 (Brown, PJ Farley, Mark Scott)
5. "Live for the Day" - 3:35 (Brown, Farley)
6. "Ride" – 3:48 (Brown, Farley)
7. "Physical Attraction" – 3:52 (Brown, Loran, DeSalvo)
8. "Tattoos & Misery" – 3:33 (Brown, Farley, Scott, Xandy Barry)
9. "The Coolest Thing" – 3:37 (Brown, Bobby August)
10. "Save Your Soul" – 4:03 (Brown)
11. "Walk With a Stranger (unused Skid Row song)" – 4:32 (Rachel Bolan, Dave "The Snake" Sabo)
12. "Find a Memory (European Bonus)" - 3:25 ()
13. "Heart of Steel (US Bonus [acoustic])" (Brown, Bill Wray)

== Credits ==
=== Band members ===
- Peter "Pete" Loran – lead vocals
- Steve Brown – lead guitar
- P. J. Farley – bass guitar
- Mark "Gus" Scott – drums, percussion, backing vocals

=== Special Guests ===
- Glen Burtnik - Additional Guitars, Bass, Vocals & Percussion (Track 1)
- Eric Ragno - Keyboards (Tracks 1, 5 & 9)
- Mark Sly - Backing Vocals (Track 9)
- Pete Evick - Additional Guitars, Percussion (Track 9)
- Bobby August - Backing Vocals (Track 9)
- Angela Marien - Backing Vocals (Track 10)
- John "J3" Allen - Backing Vocals (Track 11)

=== Production ===
- Steve Brown
- Chuck Alzakian
