= Trixter (album) =

Studio album by Trixter
- Released: May 29, 1990
- Recorded: September 1989
- Genre: Glam metal; hard rock
- Length: 56:18
- Label: MCA
- Producer: Bill Wray, Jim Wray

Trixter chronology
| Trixter (1990) | Hear! (1992) |

Singles from Trixter
- 1. "Give It to Me Good" Released: 1990; 2. "One in a Million" Released: 1991; 3. "Surrender" Released: 1991

Professional ratings
Review scores
| Source | Rating |
|---|---|
| AllMusic | 3/5 stars |
| Entertainment Weekly | B− |

Trixter is the debut album of the band Trixter. It attained gold status, reaching No. 28 on the Billboard 200 chart. The album spawned three minor hit singles on the Billboard Hot 100: "Give It to Me Good" at No. 65, "Surrender" at No. 72, and "One in a Million" at No. 75.

== Track listing ==
| No. | Title | Writer(s) | Length |
|---|---|---|---|
| 1. | "Line of Fire" | Steve Brown, Dean Fasano, Bill Wray | 4:40 |
| 2. | "Heart of Steel" | Brown, B. Wray | 4:11 |
| 3. | "One in a Million" | Brown, B. Wray, Jim Wray | 5:05 |
| 4. | "Surrender" | Brown, B. Wray, J. Wray | 6:05 |
| 5. | "Give It to Me Good" | Brown | 3:29 |
| 6. | "Only Young Once" | Peter Loran, Brown, B. Wray | 5:42 |
| 7. | "Bad Girl" | Brown, B. Wray, J. Wray | 4:19 |
| 8. | "Always a Victim" | Jack Ponti, Brown, Fasano | 4:13 |
| 9. | "Play Rough" | Brown, Fasano, B. Wray | 4:04 |
| 10. | "You'll Never See Me Cryin'" | Loran, Brown, B. Wray | 5:00 |
| 11. | "Ride the Whip" | Loran, Brown, B. Wray, J. Wray, John Allan | 5:07 |
| 12. | "On and On" | Brown | 5:03 |
| Total length: | | | 56:18 |

== Personnel ==
Trixter

- Peter "Pete" Loran – lead vocals
- Steve Brown – rhythm and lead guitar, harmonica, backing vocals
- P. J. Farley – bass guitar, backing vocals
- Mark "Gus" Scott – drums, percussion, backing vocals

Additional personnel

- Bobby Kimball - backing vocals
- Billy Trudel - backing vocals

Production

- Bill Wray - producer
- Jim Wray - associate producer, engineer
- Chris Floberg, Brian Jenkins, John Karpowich, Dennis MacKay - engineers
- Brian Foraker - engineer, mixing
- Steve Sinclair - art direction, executive producer

== Charts ==
=== Weekly charts ===
| Chart (1991) | Peak position |
|---|---|
| US Billboard 200 | 28 |

=== Year-end charts ===
| Chart (1991) | Position |
|---|---|
| US Billboard 200 | 60 |

== Certifications ==
| Region | Certification | Certified units/sales |
|---|---|---|
| United States (RIAA) | Gold | 500,000^{^} |
^{^} Shipments figures based on certification alone.
