= Undercovers (Trixter album) =

Studio album by Trixter
- Released: November 15, 1994
- Recorded: 1994
- Genre: Hard rock
- Length: 33:00
- Label: Backstreet
- Producer: Steve Brown; P. J. Farley

Trixter chronology
Hear! (1992)	Undercovers (1994)	New Audio Machine (2012)

Undercovers is an album of cover songs released by American rock band Trixter.

== Track listing ==
1. "Pump It Up" – 3:41 (Elvis Costello and the Attractions)
2. "50 Ways to Leave Your Lover" – 4:42 (Paul Simon)
3. "Terrible Lie" – 4:24 (Nine Inch Nails)
4. "Take the Long Way Home" – 5:17 (Supertramp)
5. "Dirty Deeds Done Dirt Cheap" – 3:56 (AC/DC)
6. "Revolution" – 3:45 (the Beatles)
7. "50 Ways to Leave Your Lover" (Unplugged) – 4:30 (Paul Simon)
8. "(You Gotta) Fight for Your Right (To Party)" (Live) – 4:05 (Beastie Boys)

== Credits ==
=== Trixter ===
- Peter Loran – guitars, lead vocals on "50 Ways" & "Take The Long Way Home", lead guitar on "Fight For Your Right"
- P. J. Farley – bass, percussion, lead vocals on "Terrible Lie" & "Dirty Deeds", drums on "Fight For Your Right"
- Steve Brown – lead guitars, dobro, lap steel, blues harp, lead vocals on "Pump It Up" & "Revolution", bass on "Fight For Your Right"
- Mark "Gus" Scott – drums, verbal madness on "Fight For Your Right"
