= Hear! =

Studio album by Trixter
- Released: October 13, 1992
- Recorded: 1992
- Studios: Kajem/Victory, Philadelphia
- Genres: Glam metal, hard rock
- Length: 53:26
- Label: MCA
- Producer: James Barton

Trixter chronology
| Trixter (1990) | Hear! (1992) | Undercovers (1994) |

Hear! is the second album by the American glam metal band Trixter. The album was released on October 13, 1992, through MCA Records. Hear! failed to reach the same success of the band's self-titled debut, peaking at No. 109 on the Billboard 200.

The band supported the album by touring with Kiss and Faster Pussycat.

The album's first single, "Road of a Thousand Dreams", was re-recorded and included as an iTunes bonus track on the album Human Era.

== Production ==
The album was produced by James Barton. Trixter wrote and demoed eight of the songs while touring in support of their debut. The band hoped to move away from the pop metal of Trixter by titling the album Hear! and opting to forgo a band cover photo; Trixter considered the music to be rock 'n' roll.

== Critical reception ==
Professional ratings
Review scores
| Source | Rating |
|---|---|
| AllMusic | 3/5 stars |
| Chicago Tribune | 2.5/4 stars |
| The Indianapolis Star | 2.5/4 stars |
| Rock Hard | 6.5/10 |
| Rolling Stone | 1.5/5 stars |

The Chicago Tribune wrote: "It's such a disappointment when the band you liked on their debut decides to turn tough and rocker-ready on its second disc. That's the case with Trixter, the quartet of teen rockers who brought real flavor to bubble-gum metal with Trixter in 1990." The Indianapolis Star concluded that the album shows "a great deal of improvement as musicians from two years ago, when they couldn't even play well enough to compete with Warrant and Firehouse on a touring triple bill. (That shouldn't have been difficult)."

The Star-Ledger opined that "the hard-rocking songs sound more vibrant and raw than before." Rolling Stone dismissed Hear! as "listenable but utterly uninteresting bits of album rock silliness." The Virginian-Pilot deemed it "a markedly gutsier effort."

== Track listing ==
1. "Road of a Thousand Dreams" – 4:06
2. "Damn Good" – 4:52
3. "Rockin' Horse" – 4:11
4. "Power of Love" – 3:51
5. "Runaway Train" – 5:23
6. "Bloodrock" – 4:35
7. "Waiting in That Line" – 5:05
8. "Nobody's a Hero" – 4:26
9. "Wild Is the Heart" – 4:16
10. "What It Takes" – 5:03
11. "As the Candle Burns" – 5:55
12. "On the Road Again" – 3:43

== Credits ==
Trixter

- Peter "Pete" Loran – lead vocals
- Steve Brown – lead guitar, harmonica, backing vocals
- P. J. Farley – bass guitar, backing vocals
- Mark "Gus" Scott – drums, percussion, backing vocals

Additional

- Liad Cohen – keyboards
- James Barton – producer, engineer, mixing
- Steve Brown – co-producer
- Dean Fasano – co-producer
- Stephen Marcussen – mastering
- Danny O'Neill – studio technician
- Nick Jainschigg – illustration
