= Vision (Shankar album) =

Studio album by Shankar
- Released: 1984
- Recorded: April 1983
- Studio: Talent Studio; Oslo, Norway
- Genre: Jazz
- Label: ECM 1260
- Producer: Manfred Eicher

Shankar chronology
Who's to Know (1981)	Vision (1984)	Song for Everyone (1985)

Vision is an album by Indian violinist L. Shankar recorded in April 1983 and released by ECM in 1984. The trio features Shankar playing a 10-string stereophonic double violin accompanied by saxophonist Jan Garbarek and trumpeter Palle Mikkelborg.

== Reception ==
Professional ratings
Review scores
Source	Rating
AllMusic	3/5 stars

In a review for AllMusic, Richard S. Ginell called the album "an ethereal tour-de-force," and wrote: "Exotic pan-cultural ingredients and all, Vision is reassuringly easy to listen to, undoubtedly aided by ECM's sweetly reverberant sound."

The Washington Post's J.D. Considine noted that Shankar's solo recordings "avoid entirely the excesses of fusion jazz," and instead "pursue a plangent serenity that, when it reaches the heights achieved throughout Vision..., suggests a transcendence unheard in jazz since John Coltrane's A Love Supreme."

A writer for The New York Times commented: "This is pleasant music for late-night dreaming, but unlike the quasi-meditative musical wallpaper one hears on so many ECM and Windham Hill albums, it is also music with substance and heart."

== Track listing ==
1. "All for You" – 6:36
2. "Vision" – 13:44
3. "Astral Projection" – 5:47
4. "Psychic Elephant" – 11:54
5. "The Message" – 7:22

== Personnel ==
- Shankar – 10-string double violin, percussion
- Jan Garbarek – soprano, tenor and bass saxophones, percussion
- Palle Mikkelborg – trumpet, flugelhorn
