= The Bombay Jazz Palace =

The Bombay Jazz Palace is a compilation album released on CD in the UK by Outcaste Records on 28 January 2002. The fourteen tracks featured on the CD are all influenced by both traditional Indian music, and various species of jazz and funk. The majority of the album's music dates from the 1970s or late 60s, forming part of the Western counterculture's growing interest in Asian culture.

The first ten songs are by European and American musicians exploring the instrumentation, rhythms, and scales of Indian music, with varying degrees of authenticity. The final four songs show a kind of mirror-image, with Indian musicians taking influence from popular idioms of Western music from the 1970s.

Notable musicians featured include Lalo Schifrin, Dave Pike, Ravi Shankar, and George Harrison.

The album has never seen a release outside of the UK, and received little attention in the mainstream press, although it was given a small review in The Guardian.

Intriguingly, the Outcaste Records website suggests that track 11 is 'Tal Mala', by the Diga Rhythm Band. This does not correspond to the CD's sleeve notes, nor to the music itself.

The album was 'compiled by Harv and Sunny aka Sutrasonic', with 'additional project research by Mandeep Gill'. The sleeve notes are by John Lewis.

== Track listing ==
1. Paul Horn & Nexus – Latin Tala
2. Volker Kriegal – Zoom
3. Georges Garvarenz – Haschish Party
4. Dave Mackay & Vicky Hamilton – Blues for Hari
5. The Dave Pike Set – Raga Jeera Swara
6. Between – Contemplation
7. Lalo Schifrin – Secret Code
8. Grupo Batuque – Tabla Samba
9. Yves Hyatt – Path To Ascension
10. Shocking Blue – Acka Raga
11. Shankar Family & Friends – Dispute & Violence
12. Shankar-Jaikishan – Raga Bairagi
13. Ananda Shankar – Universal Magic
14. Muhavishla Ravi Hatchud & the Indo Jazz Following – Bombay Palace Pt.1
