= Song for Everyone =

Studio album by Shankar
- Released: 1985
- Recorded: September 1984
- Studios: Rainbow Studio; Oslo, Norway
- Genre: Jazz
- Length: 50:30
- Label: ECM 1286
- Producer: Manfred Eicher

Shankar chronology
Vision (1983)	Song for Everyone (1985)	The Epidemics (1986)

Professional ratings
Review scores
Source	Rating
AllMusic	4/5 stars

Song for Everyone is an album by Indian violinist L. Shankar recorded in September 1984 and released on ECM the following year. The quartet features saxophonist Jan Garbarek and percussionists Zakir Hussain and Trilok Gurtu.

== Reception ==
AllMusic's Richard S. Ginell called the album "a brighter, more outgoing record than its predecessor Vision, veering between Western acoustic and electric grooves and the complex beats churned out by the tabla. Jan Garbarek again shines beams of light on soprano and tenor, engaging Shankar's ten-string double-necked electric violin in some complex interplay on the title track."

== Track listing ==
All compositions by Shankar.

1. "Paper Nut" – 6:08
2. "I Know" – 7:38
3. "Watching You" – 13:17
4. "Conversation" – 7:55
5. "Song for Everyone" – 6:28
6. "Let's Go Home" – 6:32
7. "Rest in Peace" – 3:24

== Personnel ==
- Shankar – 10-string double violin, drum machine
- Jan Garbarek – soprano and tenor saxophone
- Zakir Hussain – tabla, congas
- Trilok Gurtu – percussion
