= V. Lakshminarayana =

Indian music professor (1911–1990)

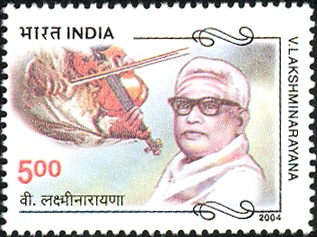
Lakshminarayana on a 2004 stamp of India

Vaidyanatha Lakshminarayana (1911–1990) was an Indian musician. He was born in British India in 1911 and became professor of music at the age of 29. His sons L. Vaidyanathan, L. Subramaniam and L. Shankar are also a notable musicians.

He performed the violin in many World Music Festivals of Cal-State University, Whitter College Music Academy of Los Angeles. He was honoured with many awards and titles including the `Sangeetha Chakravarthy’ conferred by the Indian Music Circle USA. Prof. Lakshminarayana Iyer served as a Visiting Professor and artiste in Universities abroad. He was a visiting professor in California Institute of the Arts Valencia, California. He composed many kirtanas and also cittasvaras to the compositions of his composer daughter Ganam. He died in 1990 due to cancer. In 1992, the Madras Music Academy, honoured V. Lakshminarayana Iyer's contribution by placing his portrait in the “Hall of fame”. The Lakshminarayana Global Music Awards have been instituted as a tribute to his memory. The Government of India released a stamp in 2004 to commemorate V. Lakshminarayana.
