= Touch Me There =

Studio album by Shankar
- Released: September 24, 1979; August 18, 1992 (reissue)
- Recorded: Advision Studios
- Genre: Jazz rock, indo jazz, progressive rock, jazz fusion
- Length: 36:01
- Label: Zappa
- Producer: Frank Zappa

Shankar chronology
Touch Me There (1979)	Who's to Know (1980)

Touch Me There is the debut solo album by L. Shankar, released in 1979 on Zappa Records. Shankar performed acoustic and 5-string Barcus Berry electric violin.

== Production ==
The album was produced by Frank Zappa. He also served as the album's lyricist and who co-wrote, with Shankar, the music for the tracks "Dead Girls of London" and "No More Mr. Nice Girl." Shankar composed all the other music for the album and served as arranger and orchestrator.

"Dead Girls Of London" was originally intended to be sung by Van Morrison. He was signed to Warner Bros. Records, who Zappa was in a legal dispute with at the time. Zappa was unable to release the song with Morrison's vocals, so it was re-recorded by Zappa and Ike Willis. The original version later appeared on the compilation The Frank Zappa AAAFNRAAAAAM Birthday Bundle 2011.

Vicky Blumenthal provides the chorus on "Dead Girls Of London," "Knee-Deep In Heaters," and "No More Mr. Nice Girl," while Jenny Lautrec sings the lyrics to "Touch Me There," and Shankar himself sings the lyrics to the album's final track, "Knee-Deep In Heaters."

"Dead Girls of London" was released as a 12" maxi single on September 24, 1979.

== Release history ==
The album was released on Zappa Records in 1979, and was reissued on CD by Barking Pumpkin Records in 1992. It was released on iTunes in 2012.

The original album is credited to "L. Shankar", but on CD and iTunes, he is credited as "Shankar".

== Reception ==
Professional ratings
Review scores
Source	Rating
AllMusic	3/5 stars
The Rolling Stone Jazz Record Guide	3/5 stars

AllMusic writer Ken Dryden called the album "uneven but worthwhile".

== Track listing ==
=== Original vinyl release ===
(Zappa Records, 1979)

Side One:

1. Dead Girls Of London (L. Shankar: Music, Frank Zappa: Lyrics, music) – 5:23
2. Windy Morning (Shankar: Music) – 3:57
3. Knee Deep in Heaters (Shankar: Music, F. Zappa: Lyrics) – 5:38
4. Little Stinker (Shankar: Music) – 3:20

Side Two:

1. Darlene (Shankar: Music) – 2:56
2. Touch Me There (Shankar: Music, F. Zappa: Lyrics) – 3:03
3. No More Mr. Nice Girl (Shankar, F. Zappa) – 8:16
4. Love Gone Away (Shankar: Music) – 3:33

=== CD reissue ===
(Barking Pumpkin Records, 1992)

1. Dead Girls Of London (L. Shankar: Music, Frank Zappa: Lyrics, music) – 5:23
2. Little Stinker (Shankar: Music) – 3:20
3. Touch Me There (Shankar: Music, F. Zappa: Lyrics) – 3:03
4. No More Mr. Nice Girl (Shankar, F. Zappa)– 8:16
5. Love Gone Away (Shankar: Music) – 3:33
6. Darlene (Shankar: Music) – 2:56
7. Windy Morning (Shankar: Music) – 3:57
8. Knee-Deep in Heaters (Shankar: Music, F. Zappa: Lyrics) – 5:38

== Personnel ==
- L. Shankar – Acoustic violin, 5 string Barcus Berry electric violin and string orchestra. Vocals on "Knee Deep in Heaters"
- Phil Palmer - Mandolin, acoustic and electric guitars
- Dave Marquee - Bass
- Simon Phillips - Drums
- James Lascelles - Fender rhodes, organ, acoustic piano, synthesizer
- Jack Emblow - Accordion on "No More Mr. Nice Girl"
- Stucco Homes (Frank Zappa) - Vocals on "Dead Girls of London"
- Vicky Blumenthal - Chorus on "Dead Girls of London," "Knee Deep in Heaters," "No More Mr. Nice Girl"
- Jenny Lautrec - Vocals on "Touch Me There"
- Ike Willis - Vocals on "Dead Girls of London"

== Production ==
- L. Shankar - Basic arrangement for "Little Stinker," "Love Gone Away" and "Darlene". Recording arrangement and orchestration for "Love Gone Away"
- Ron Frangipane - Basic arrangement except on "Little Stinker" and "Darlene." Recording arrangement and orchestration for "Love Gone Away"
- Frank Zappa - Producer, recording arrangements and orchestration except on "Love Gone Away"
- Geoff Young - Engineer
- Peter Wooldiscroft - Tape Operator
- Steve Nye - Engineer
- Tim Cuthbertson - Tape Operator
- Mick Glossop - Engineer
- Alan Douglas - Tape Operator
- Carol Friedman - Cover design & photography
- Jonathan Pite - Photographer's assistant
- Joseph D'Anna - Personal management
