= The Epidemics =

Studio album by Shankar/Caroline
- Released: 1986
- Recorded: February 1985
- Genre: Post-punk; electro-pop; synth pop
- Label: ECM 1308

Shankar chronology
Song for Everyone (1985)	The Epidemics (1986)	M.R.C.S. (1989)

The Epidemics is an album by Indian violinist L. Shankar and British vocalist, keyboardist and composer Caroline recorded in February 1985 and released on ECM the following year.

== Reception ==
Professional ratings
Review scores
Source	Rating
AllMusic	3/5 stars

Elsewhere's Graham Reid included the album in his list of "10 Unusual ECM Albums of the Eighties I Own", and remarked: "This is a kind of post-punk electro-pop outing... Synth pop with very little catchy pop, emotionally flat vocals by Caroline, widdly rock guitar by Vai and bassist Jones probably wondering why he was doing this."

A writer for Black Country Rock commented: "Squalling heavy rock guitars, eighties booming drums, fretless electric bass and new wave vocals—there is literally nothing else like it in the ECM canon... It is a strange record but probably the most accessible in the ECM catalogue for non-jazz or classical fans, sounding like a traditional eighties rock album."

Tyran Grillo, writing for ECM blog Between Sound and Space, acknowledged that "the musicianship is healthy and the record not without its charm," but stated: "it's difficult to gauge the artists' intentions. Tongue-in-cheek experiment? Worldly statement? Either way, I feel lost, and welcome anyone who knows better to help me find my way." He concluded: "An intriguing detour on the label's path through a sonic territory as vast as it is varied, it is the only ECM album I would never recommend."

== Track listing ==
1. "Never Take No for an Answer" (Caroline, Shankar) – 3:31
2. "What Would I Do Without You" (Shankar) – 4:10
3. "Situations" (Caroline, Shankar)- 5:23
4. "You Don't Love Me Any More" (Shankar) – 3:36
5. "You Can Be Anything" (Caroline, Shankar) – 3:56
6. "No Cure" (Caroline, Shankar) – 3:38
7. "Don't I Know You" (Caroline, Shankar) – 3:58
8. "Give an Inch" (Shankar) – 3:24
9. "Full Moon" (Shankar) – 3:20

== Personnel ==
- Shankar – vocals, violin, synthesizer, drum machine
- Caroline – vocals, synthesizer, tamboura
- Percy Jones – bass
- Steve Vai – guitar
- Gilbert Kaufman – synthesizer
- Dileep Kumar (later known as A. R. Rahman) – keyboards, synthesizer
