= L. Shankar =

Indian violinist, singer and composer (born 1950)

L.Shankar
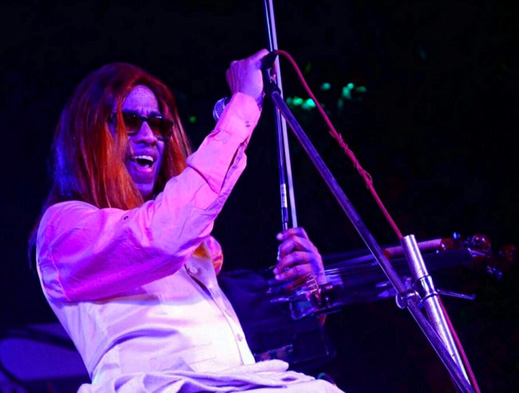
- L.Shankar

Background information
- Also known as: L. Shankar, Shankar, Shenkar
- Born: Lakshminarayana Shankar; 26 April 1950 (age 76); Madras, Madras State, India (now Chennai, Tamil Nadu, India)
- Genres: World music; Carnatic; Indian classical; progressive rock; pop rock; fusion; new-age; rock; EDM
- Occupations: Vocalist; electric violinist; lyricist; arranger; producer
- Instruments: Double violin; vocals; keyboards
- Years active: 1960s–present
- Labels: X DOT 25/Orchard/Sony; Cleopatra; ECM; Zappa; EMI
- Formerly of: Jonathan Davis and the SFA; Peter Gabriel; Frank Zappa; Shakti
- Website: lshankar.com

Lakshminarayana Shankar (born 26 April 1950), is an Indian violinist, singer and composer who goes by the stage name Shenkar. Known as a world music icon for his significant contributions to world music, he is often regarded as one of the pioneers of East-West fusion, blending the traditions of Indian classical with Western genres such as rock, pop, jazz, and electronic music. His extensive body of work spans a wide spectrum of genres, encompassing vocal and instrumental compositions. He has released 28 solo albums, the two latest being Full Moon and Over the Stars, which were released in September and August 2024, respectively.

Shankar is credited with inventing the stereophonic double violin (known as the LSD – L. Shankar Double Violin), which covers the orchestral string family's range. His world music albums with the band Shakti during the mid-70s became the "standard to gauge the playing and composing abilities of any world musician following in Shakti's expansive wake". In 1990, Shankar's talam-bending (time cycles of 9 3/4 & 6 3/4 beats) Pancha Nadai Pallavi album was on the Billboard top ten world music chart for three months, becoming the first traditional Indian record to attain this status. His 1995 Raga Aberi album was nominated for a Grammy Award, in the Best World Music Album category.

With Peter Gabriel, he worked on the Grammy Award winning album Passion (1989), which was the soundtrack album for Martin Scorsese's The Last Temptation of Christ (1988). He also wrote and performed vocals on Mel Gibson's The Passion of the Christ (2004) which won a Dove Award for Instrumental Album of the Year at the 36th GMA Dove Awards. Shankar worked on the soundtrack for the 2002 film Queen of the Damned with Jonathan Davis and Richard Gibbs and recorded eight songs of which five were picked for the movie. Additionally, he collaborated on the original score for NBC's TV series Heroes with Wendy & Lisa. Shankar is ranked amongst the greatest violinists of popular music by Digital Dream Door.

== Early life, family and education ==
Lakshminarayana Shankar was born in Madras, India, on 26 April 1950 as the sixth child into a family of musicians. His three sisters studied vocal music whereas Shankar and his two brothers - Lakshminarayana Vaidyanathan and Lakshminarayana Subramaniam were trained in both vocal music as well as violin playing. His father Vaidyanatha Lakshminarayana was a renowned Carnatic vocalist and violinist and his mother Lakshminarayana Seetalakshmi was a trained singer and played the veena. Considered as a child prodigy, Shankar began vocal training with his father at the age of two. Within a year, he was able to hum complex lines of traditional Indian compositions. Having a vocal range of 5 1/2 octaves Shankar often emphasizes the importance of vocal training in addition to learning an instrument to better grasp the ornamentation in Indian music. He said, "If you learn vocals and instruments and get an all-round education in music, it makes you a better performer".

By the age of three, Shankar was deeply immersed in music, regularly listening to the lessons his father gave to his older siblings and other disciples. Though considered too young to play an instrument and unable to participate, he memorized many of the songs they practiced through constant listening and was able to sing along. He recalled, 'When my brothers practiced violin, I would imitate with an imaginary violin made of two sticks.' On his fifth birthday, when offered a tricycle, Shankar instead asked for a violin. He received his first violin (quarter size violin from Germany) at the age of 5 and when he began playing the violin, the lines he practiced were vocal melodies he had learned. At the age of 7, he gave his first public concert during a festival at the Nallur Kandaswamy temple in Jaffna.

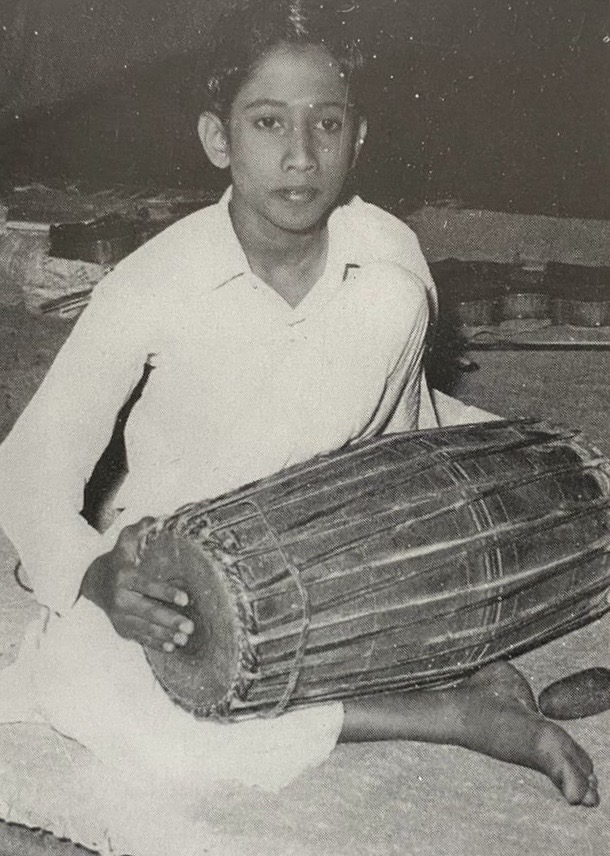
Young L. Shankar on mridangam

Apart from singing and playing the violin, he pursued professional mridangam playing until the age of 12. He said "my father really insisted that besides learning your melodic instrument, you also learn percussion". However, he had to discontinue at his father's suggestion when he began to develop calluses on his hands.

During the ethnic riots in 1958, their house was raided and set ablaze. The family fled Sri Lanka, leaving everything behind and returned to Madras, India. In that year, Shankar and his two older brothers formed the Violin Trio which "made history in 20th century Carnatic music" scene.

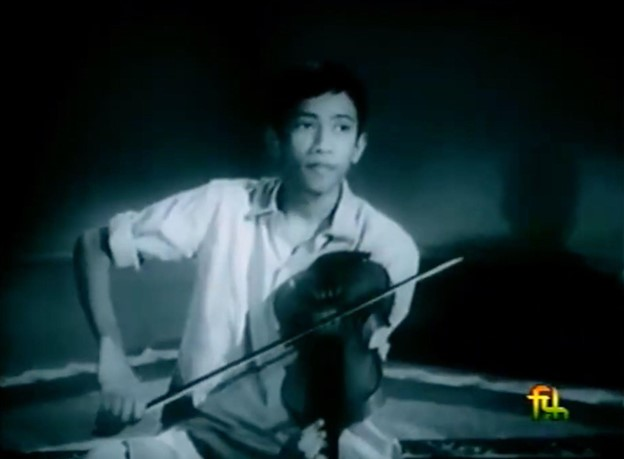
L. Shankar (aged 13) recorded in 1963 by Films Division for a documentary.

Shankar gained considerable reputation across India in his early youth as an accompanist and filled in for some of the most eminent names in Carnatic music often performing solo concerts that lasted between two and three hours. By the age of 17, Shankar had become a highly sought-after violinist, performing regularly on national television and recorded several albums. His early success and his improvisational ingenuity is often credited to his consistent discipline and demanding practice routine for hours. He said "father used to get up around 4:00 AM and wake us up. He'd practiced with us for an hour or more. We went to school at 7:30 but when we returned at 1:30 father was waiting for us with another lesson. After dinner we'd all get together and have a kind of jam session."

In spite of his early success as a musician, Shankar faced pressure from his family to have a fall back career as an engineer. He obtained a B.S. in physics from India and his father tried to acquire an engineering seat for him. Shankar, however, believed that music was his true calling. He even vowed to break 108 coconuts at the Luz Pillayar Temple in order not to secure admission and was delighted when the results favored him.

In 1969, he was offered a teaching position at Wesleyan University and moved to the US. He performed regularly on campus while pursuing a PhD in ethnomusicology, which he completed in 1974.

== Influences ==
Shankar was encouraged by his father to absorb influences from the Northern Indian music traditions as well as Southern Indian traditions. According to Shankar "there is not one music that is superior to another – just different ways of expressing the beauty of our culture." He was also advised to become familiar with Western classical music and had been exposed to various Western genres such as rock and pop music since his early teens. At Wesleyan University, he studied world music and learnt the music systems of different cultures. According to Shankar, "Music is universal, it connects all races, religions and ages. It's the only language everyone can understand and feel". Shankar had always been open to experimentation in music. He said that from a young age, he perceived music visually and often compared it to the colors in an artwork. He said "I've tried to combine different traditions…musical styles are like colors in painting: there are so many things you can do with them".

== Cross-cultural collaborations ==
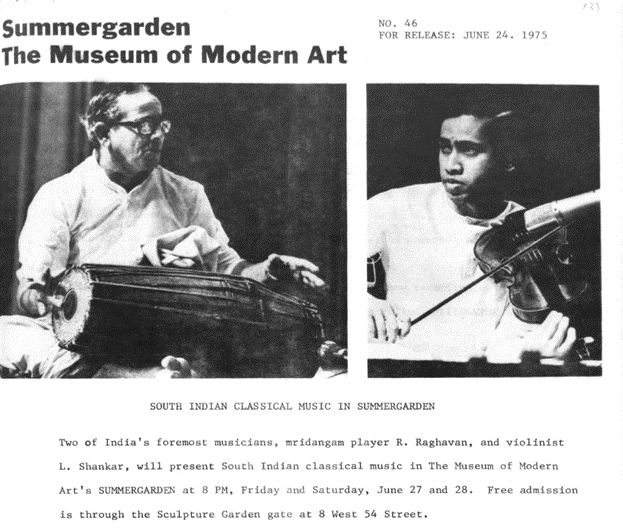
L. Shankar & Ramnad V. Raghavan performed South Indian Classical music in Summergarden, New York, 1975.

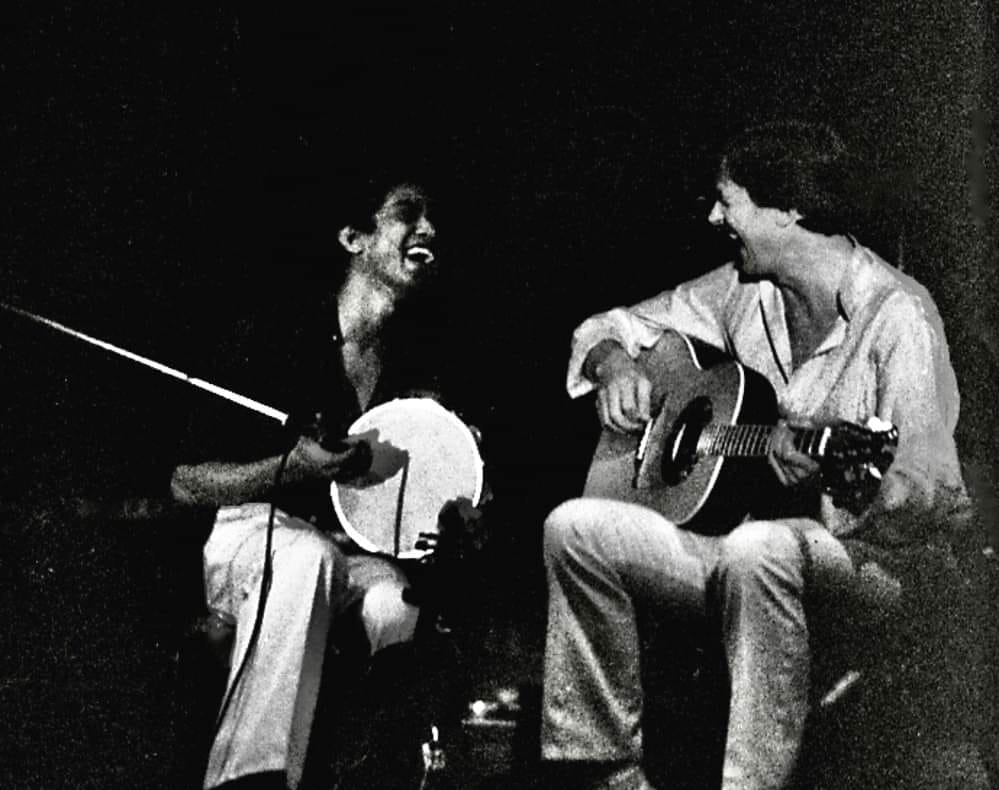
L Shankar with McLaughlin's One Truth Band in 1978

Shankar was among the early pioneers in the 70s who introduced South Indian music to a Western audience that was more accustomed to North Indian music at that time. He often merged Carnatic & Hindustani styles in his performances and collaborated with jazz musicians to bridge the gap between Eastern and Western music traditions. His early American recording sessions were on Archie Shepp's Attica Blues and Clifford Thornton's Communication Network in 1972. His understanding of the Western music system and having the "sensitivity, the control, the feeling, and the knowledge" of classical Indian enabled the representation of the East/West blend in music that led to the founding of the group Shakti with guitarist John McLaughlin. He taught McLaughlin ragas, rhythms and ornamentation and in turn learnt about harmony and jazz Shakti received overwhelming critical acclaim. According to Naresh of Man's World magazine, Shankar's compositions in Shakti, were praised for their innovativeness and "for how effortlessly they projected his very own voice."

== Double violin (LSD) ==
Since 1980, Shankar has been using the double violin - a 10-string, stereophonic double-necked electric violin - for all his performances and recordings which he designed and had it made by Ken Parker of Stuyvesant Sound in New York. The instrument made its debut in 1981 on Phil Collins' solo album Face Value, as well as on Shankar's own album Who's to Know. The concept for the double violin originated in 1978, after producing his album by Zappa Records where Shankar had to overdub a wide range of string instruments as he was unable to find session musicians who could render the Indian ornaments and styles he wanted. He made a prototype with cardboard and spent about a year and a half improving the design. According to Shankar, "It was not easy to get anyone to take my violin seriously until I crafted one myself putting it together piece by piece and then suddenly they responded". He and Parker spent hours testing various materials and forms and he made sure that both necks were equally strong to avoid a tendency to predominantly play on only one. Also known as the LSD (L.Shankar's Double violin), the lower neck covers the double bass and cello range and the upper neck generates treble sounds; the violin and viola. In addition to providing a wide range of 11 octaves (5 ½ octaves on each neck), playing on one neck produces a sympathetic effect on the other. The horizontal rib can be positioned beneath the chin or supported against the chest (Indian style) while playing.

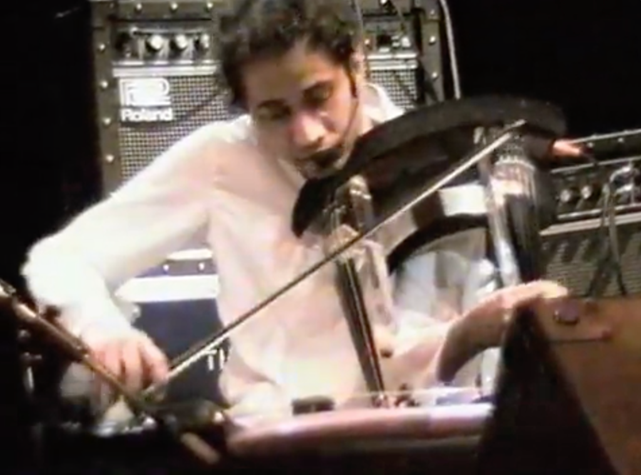
L. Shankar in Milano (Teatre Ciak), 1990

Due to the instrument's greater angle, the bowing was different and Shankar incorporated new techniques including playing on both necks simultaneously. According to him, "It's musically more satisfying". The double violin is capable of replicating a full orchestra's effect, allowing for traditional classical performance as well as versatility in pop and jazz genres. Shankar stated that "I suppose what matters is not the violin but how you play it. Without that effort your violin will never learn to speak and [even] 20 strings will make no difference". To date, Shankar has commissioned four different versions of the double violin, with the latest edition crafted by luthier John Jordan and released in 2023.

== Lakshminarayana World Music Festival ==
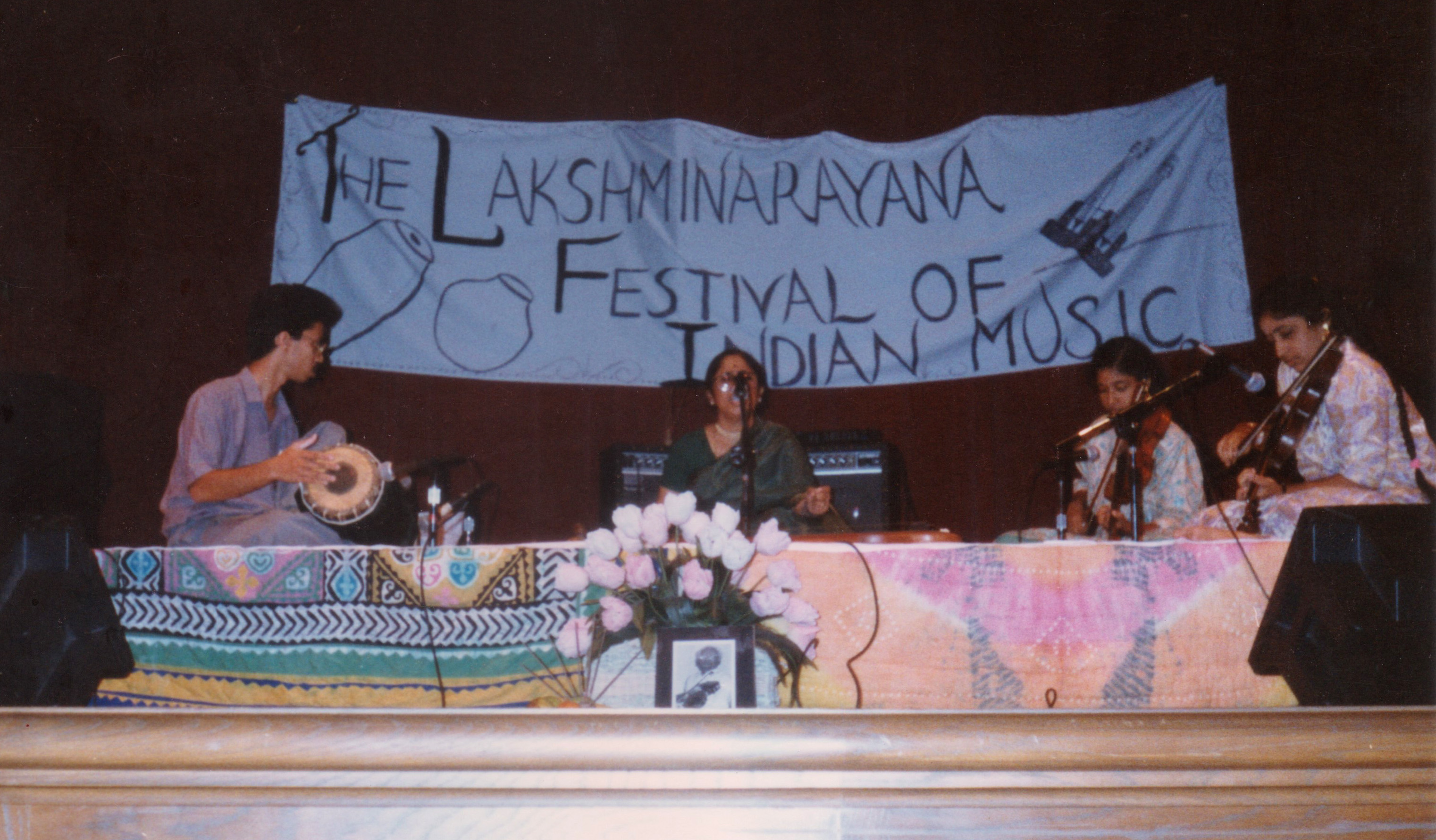
L. Shankar launched the first Lakshminarayana Music Festival in Los Angeles & San Francisco in 1991.

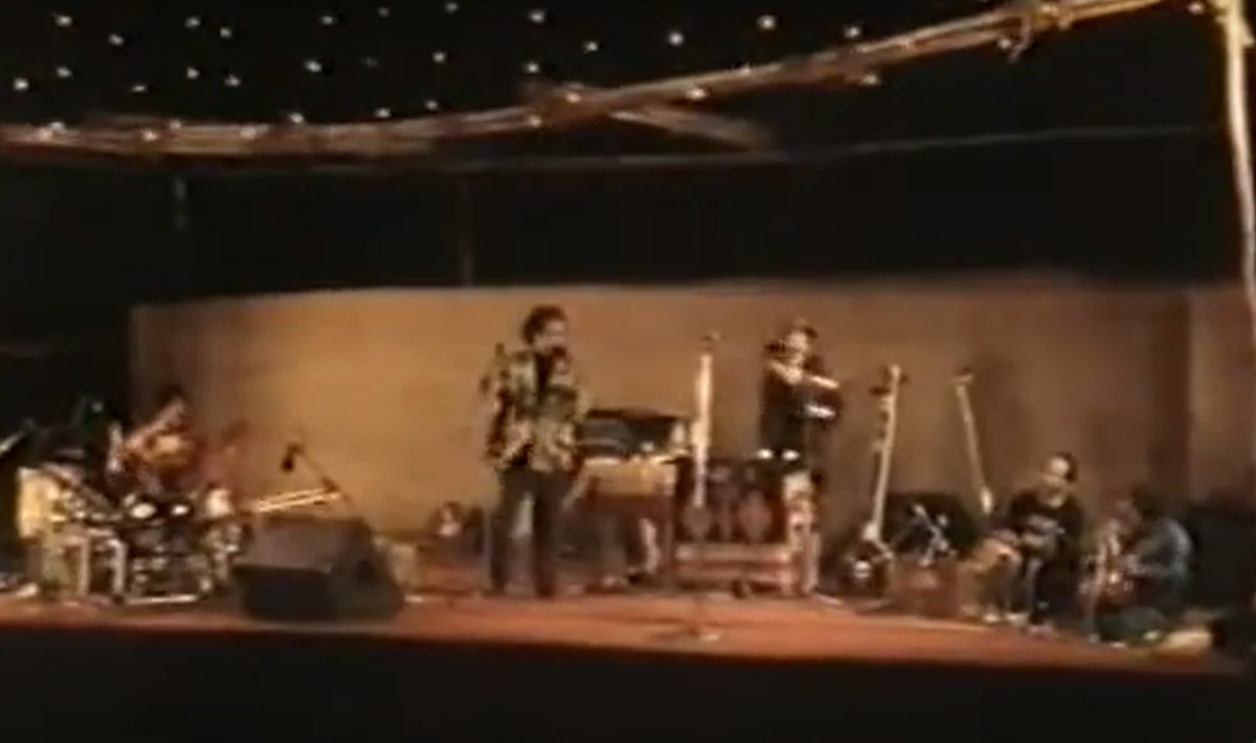
L. Shankar's tribute concert to V. Lakshminarayana in Bombay on 1 January 1992 was filmed by the BBC and featured in the documentary Bombay and All That Jazz (1992).

As a tribute to his late father, V. Lakshminarayana, Shankar launched the Lakshminarayana Music Festival in 1991 in Los Angeles and San Francisco, following his father's death in 1990. The 1992 BBC film Bombay and All that Jazz, directed by H. O. Nazareth and co-produced by Shankar, was based on the tribute concert held in Bombay on New Year's Day, January 1, 1992. It features performances by renowned musicians such as Don Cherry, TH Vinayakram, and Trilok Gurtu. The film was also nominated for best documentary at the Cannes Film Festival.

"This concert is in memory of my father, V. Lakshminarayana and this is the first World Music Festival - Lakshminarayana Festival - in Bombay. We had the same festival in America a few months ago - in San Francisco and Los Angeles."

— L. Shankar, Bombay and All That Jazz, 1992

Subsequently, L. Subramaniam and Viji Subramaniam held a similar tribute concert called the Lakshminarayana Global Music Festival in Madras (Chennai) on January 11, 1992.

== Career ==
=== 1960s–1975 Violin Trio ===
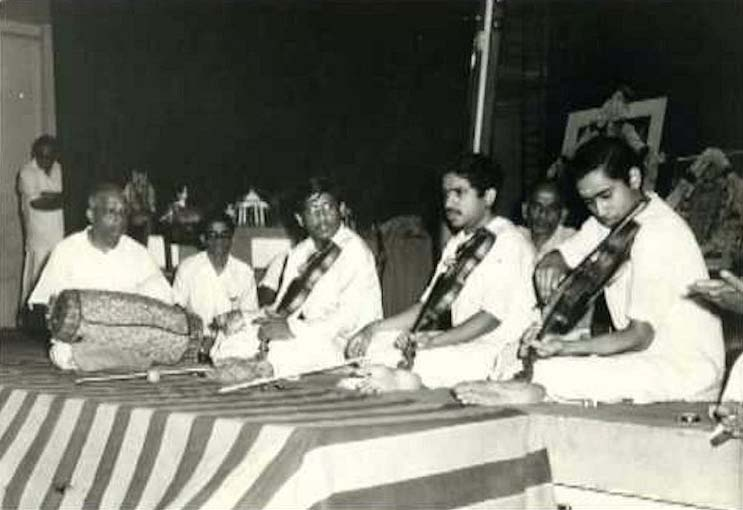
Violin Trio: L Vaidyanathan, L Subramaniam and L Shankar with Palghat Mani Iyer on mridangam

Shankar, along with his brothers L. Vaidyanathan and L. Subramaniam, pioneered the trend of sibling ensembles performing Carnatic music. Prior to that, Carnatic violin had been primarily a solo instrument or used as an accompaniment in vocal concerts. They began performing together as the "Violin Trio". Although this approach was initially criticized by traditionalists, their music gained immense popularity in India and ultimately spread worldwide during the 1970s. They recorded several albums as the Violin Trio.

=== 1973–1984: Shakti (formerly known as Turiyananda Sangeet) ===
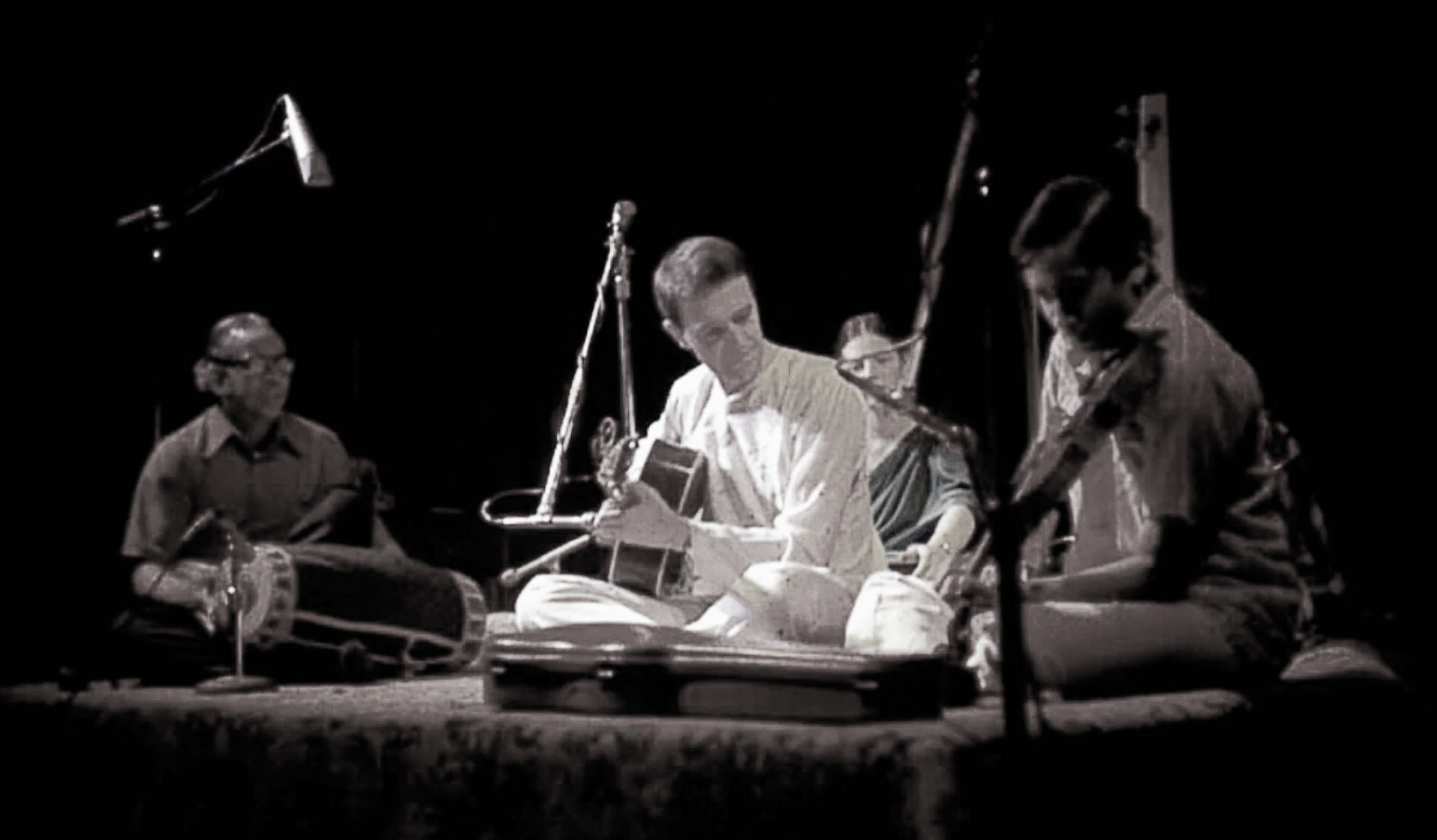
Turiyananda Sangit - performed on March 16, 1975, at St. Thomas Episcopal Church in New York

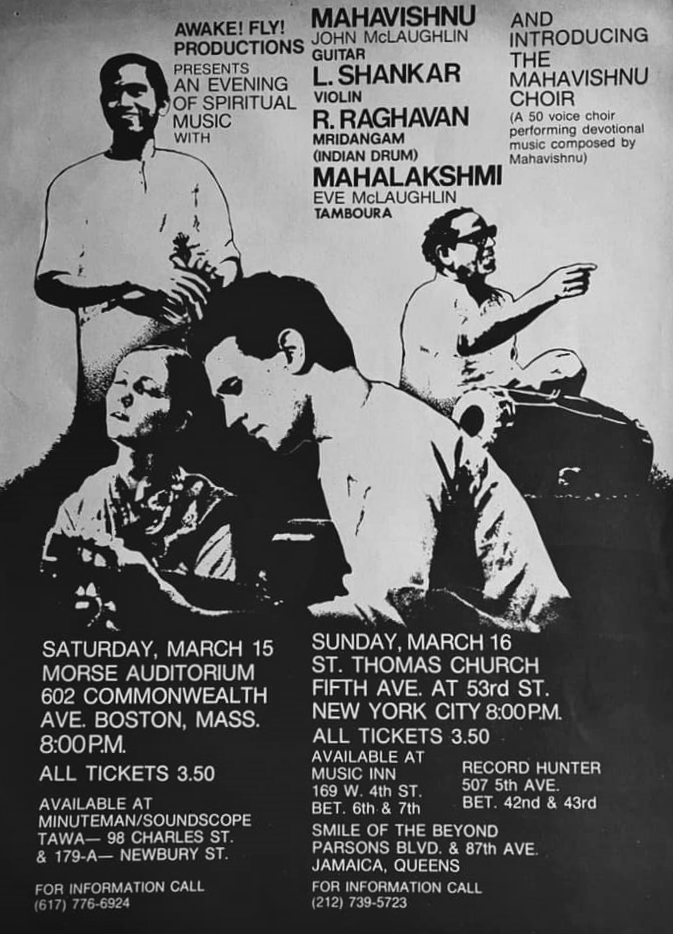
Turiyananda Sangit (1975) featuring L. Shankar, John McLaughlin & R. Raghavan

The original line-up, formed in 1973 consisted of Shankar on violin, John McLaughlin on guitar, R. Raghavan on mridangam, Mahalakshmi Eve McLaughlin (tamboura) and Tanima (shruti box). Before Shakti became known under this name, they were called Turiyananda Sangit, a name given to them by Sri Chinmoy, literally translated as 'the pinnacle delight in music' Zakir Hussain was later added on tabla and the name was changed to Shakti as the band members wanted a name that "listeners in the West could relate to". Raghavan didn't stay with the project and TH Vikku Vinayakaram was added on ghatam for the remainder of those Shakti days. The group toured extensively, gaining international recognition by 1976, and were considered as the game-changers of Indo-jazz fusion.

"Shankar and McLaughlin were the pillars of Shakti, one of the decade's most innovative musical groups" — Charles Paikert, Cash Box Magazine, Dec 1979

Shankar co-wrote all of the group's material with John McLaughlin, resulting in the release of three world music albums under the CBS label: Shakti with John McLaughlin (1976), A Handful of Beauty (1976), and Natural Elements (1977). According to Lee Underwood, a DownBeat music magazine critic, "All three are masterpieces, of which the deeply moving and technically astonishing Handful of Beauty will stand tall in recorded history for decades to come." In 1978, Shankar was listed fourth among Established Violinists by Downbeat's Critics Poll, and came in second in the TDWR ("Talent Deserving Wider Recognition") division.

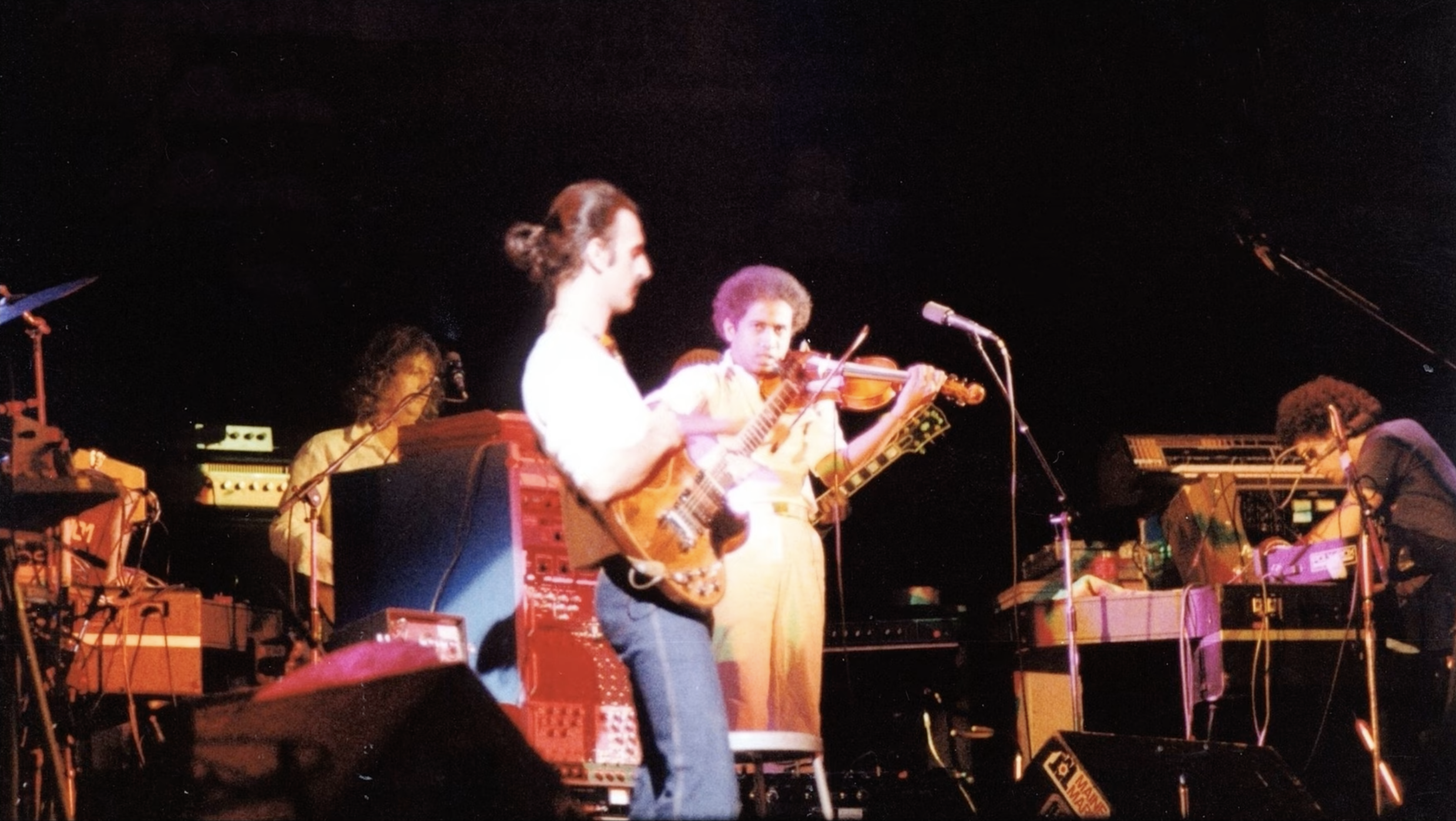
Frank Zappa & L. Shankar in Berlin, 1978

The group disbanded in 1978 and as Shankar put it, "I felt enough time wasn't given to rehearsals and I wanted to do it right". During this period, Shankar took on the role of playing the electric violin and toured alongside Frank Zappa, succeeding Jean-Luc Ponty in the position. The experience led to Zappa producing and contributing lyrics for his debut 1979 American solo album, Touch Me There. In 1979, Shankar briefly joined McLaughlin's One Truth Band, which also included Fernando Saunders on bass, Stu Goldberg on keyboards, and Tony Smith on drums, to record the studio album, Electric Dreams.

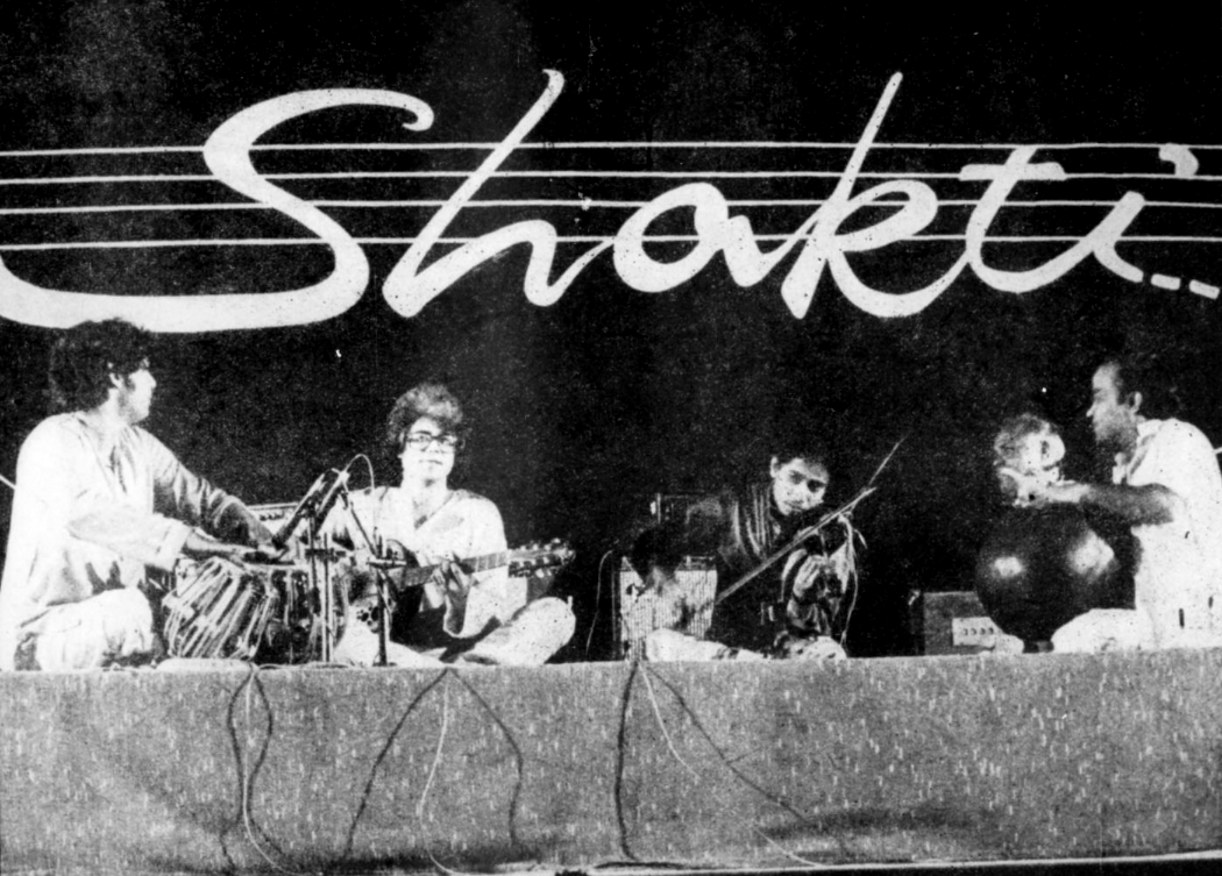
Shakti performing with Larry Coryell in India, 1982

Between 1982 - 1984, Shakti regrouped for a reunion tour in India, this time with Shankar performing on the double violin. In 1982, Larry Coryell filled in when McLaughlin had injured one of his playing fingers.

Shakti regrouped again in 1997 under the name Remember Shakti. However, the new line-up excluded Shankar.

=== 1979: Touch Me There by Zappa Records ===
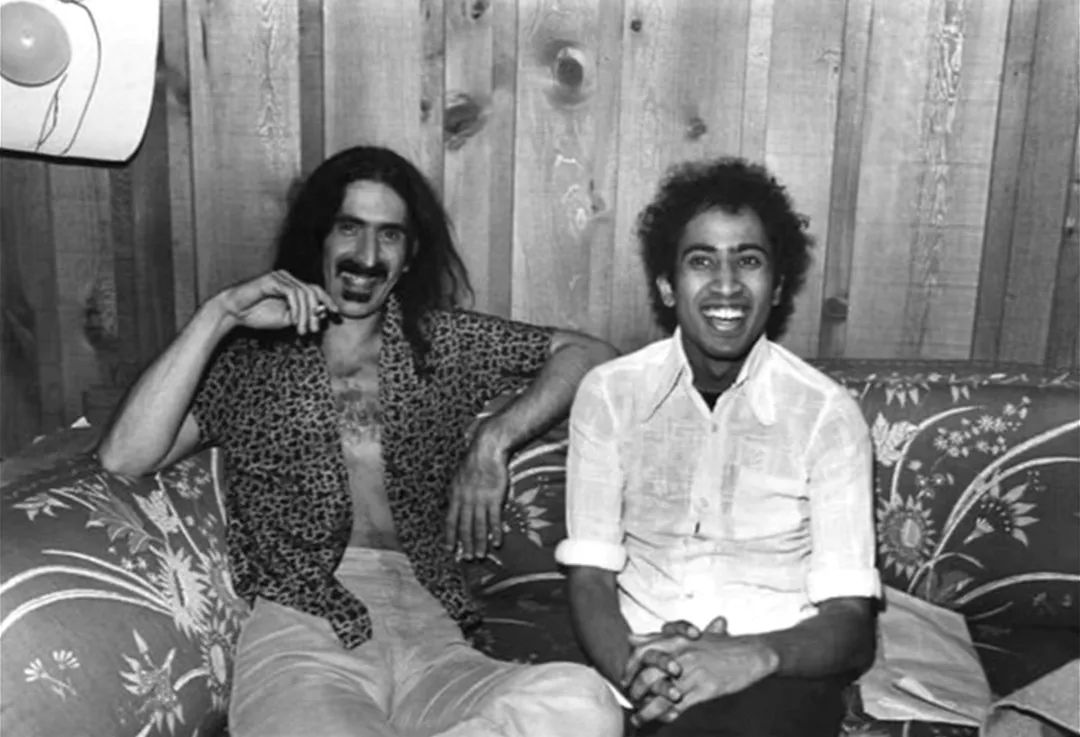
Frank Zappa & L Shankar during the production of Touch Me There by Zappa Records

Shankar met Frank Zappa in 1978 while they were both working at a pop festival in Germany and during a casual jam session, Zappa extended an invitation for him to play with his band in New York. Following the dissolution of Shakti, Shankar toured briefly with Zappa, which resulted in him signing the violinist to his label. As per Zappa, "The reason I wanted to sign him is because I like the way he plays". In 1979, they released Touch Me There, an album that featured Shankar's electric five-string violin and vocals alongside guitarist Phil Palmer and drummer Simon Phillips. The album was produced in England, featuring a British rhythm section. Most of the compositions were Shankar's, while Zappa handled the arrangements and wrote the lyrics that were included in the album. According to Zappa, "it's got a lot of stuff that's' definitely going to hit the radio right where it lives."

"Shankar's probably the best violinist in the world; he's really incredible." — Frank Zappa, BAM Magazine, October 5, 1979

Initially, Shankar had entered into a 10-album deal with Zappa Records. However, a conflict between the distributors and Zappa led to the eventual termination of the agreement.

=== 1980–1985: Who's To Know, Vision & Song For Everyone ===
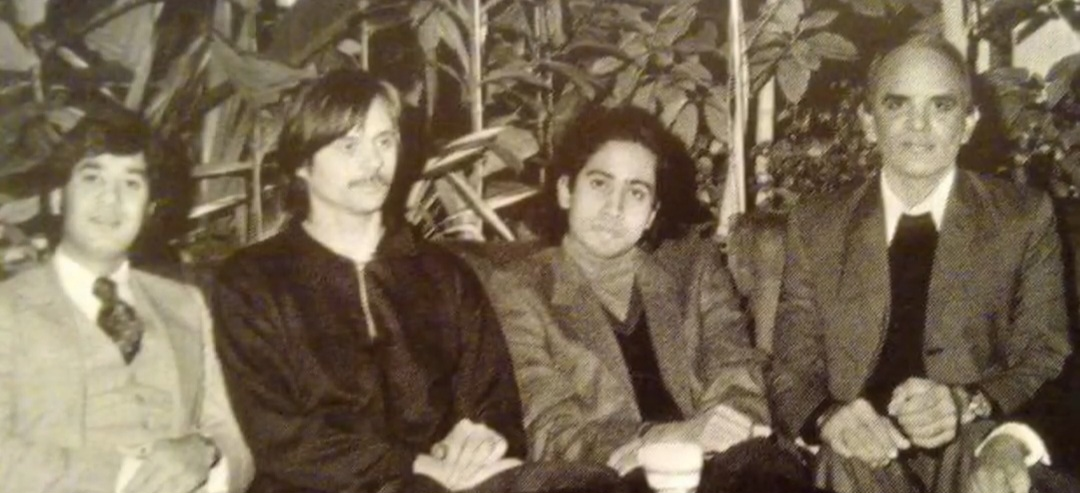
From left: Zakir Hussain, Manfred Eicher, L. Shankar, Umayalpuram K. Sivaraman

In the 1980s, Shankar released several albums under the ECM label, his first being Who's To Know, featuring his double violin and accompanied by Umayalpuram K. Sivaraman on mridangam and Zakir Hussain on tabla. According to ECM reviewer, Tyran Grillo, the album "will ever remain an ECM jewel" owing to Shankar's signature style and melodic sensibility. In 1984, Shankar released his second ECM album, Vision, accompanied by saxophonist Jan Garbarek and trumpeter Palle Mikkelborg. In an AllMusic review, Richard S. Ginell describes the album as "an ethereal tour-de-force" that is reassuringly easy to listen to. According to J.D. Considine from The Washington Post, Shankar's "solo recordings avoid entirely the excesses of fusion jazz" and instead, "pursue a plangent serenity... that suggests a transcendence unheard in jazz." Song for Everyone was released in 1985 and remains the most memorable among his ECM releases. According to Shankar, "It is a highlight that stays with me, the melodies keep coming up in my playing".

=== 1986–1989: The Epidemics and other ventures ===
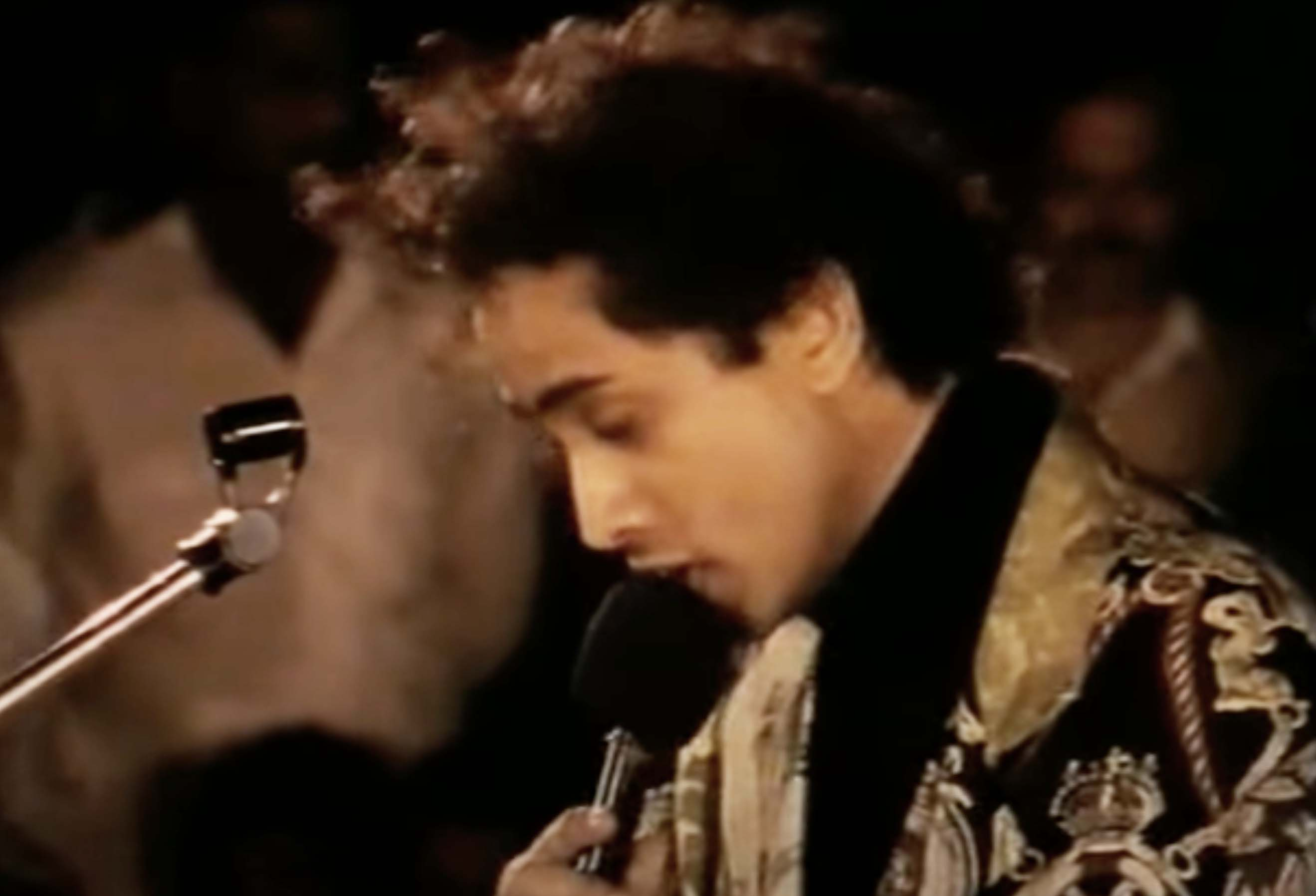
From the BBC documentary, Bombay and All that Jazz, 1992

Between 1986 and 1989, Shankar released 3 albums: The Epidemics (1986) with Caroline Morgan, Do What You Do (1987), and Eye Catcher (1989) under the pop/rock group The Epidemics (previously known as Sadhu, after his pet rabbit). In 1987, the three former members of Shakti–Shankar, Zakir, and Vikku—undertook a brief tour as Peshkar with Larry Coryell in Britain. Concurrently, Shankar joined SXL, a jazz fusion collective initiated in the same year by composer Bill Laswell. This ensemble featured a core group of musicians, including Aïyb Dieng, Ronald Shannon Jackson, along with South Korean percussion quartet, SamulNori. The performances, which took place on August 1 and 2, collectively attracted an audience of nearly 30,000. These events were preserved through live recordings with Sony releasing SXL Live in Japan (1987) and Celluloid Records presenting SXL Into the Outlands (1987).

=== 1990–1995: Classical solo albums & Raga Aberi ===
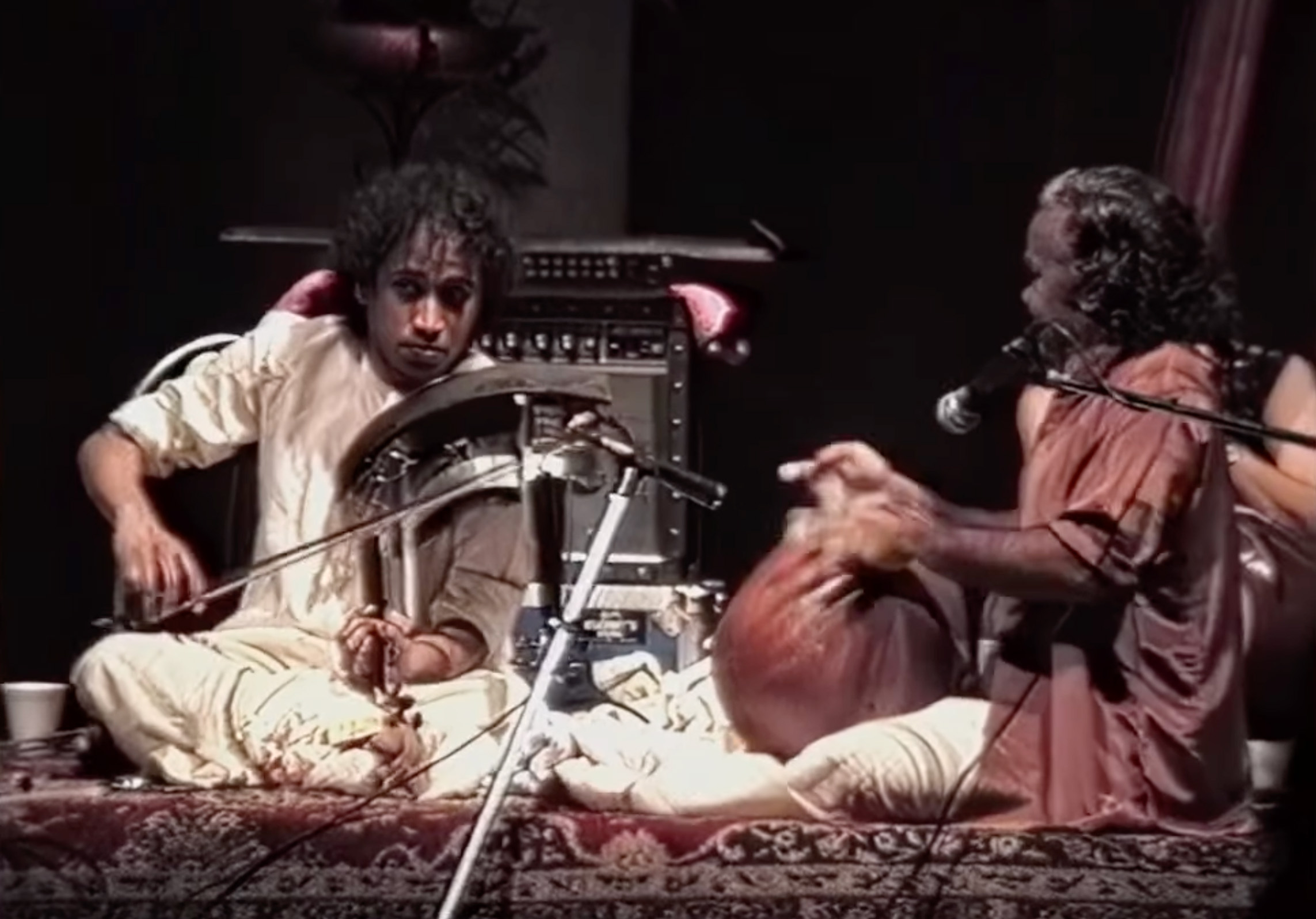
L.Shankar, Vikku Vinayakram (pictured) & Zakir Hussain in 1988 (Berkeley, California).

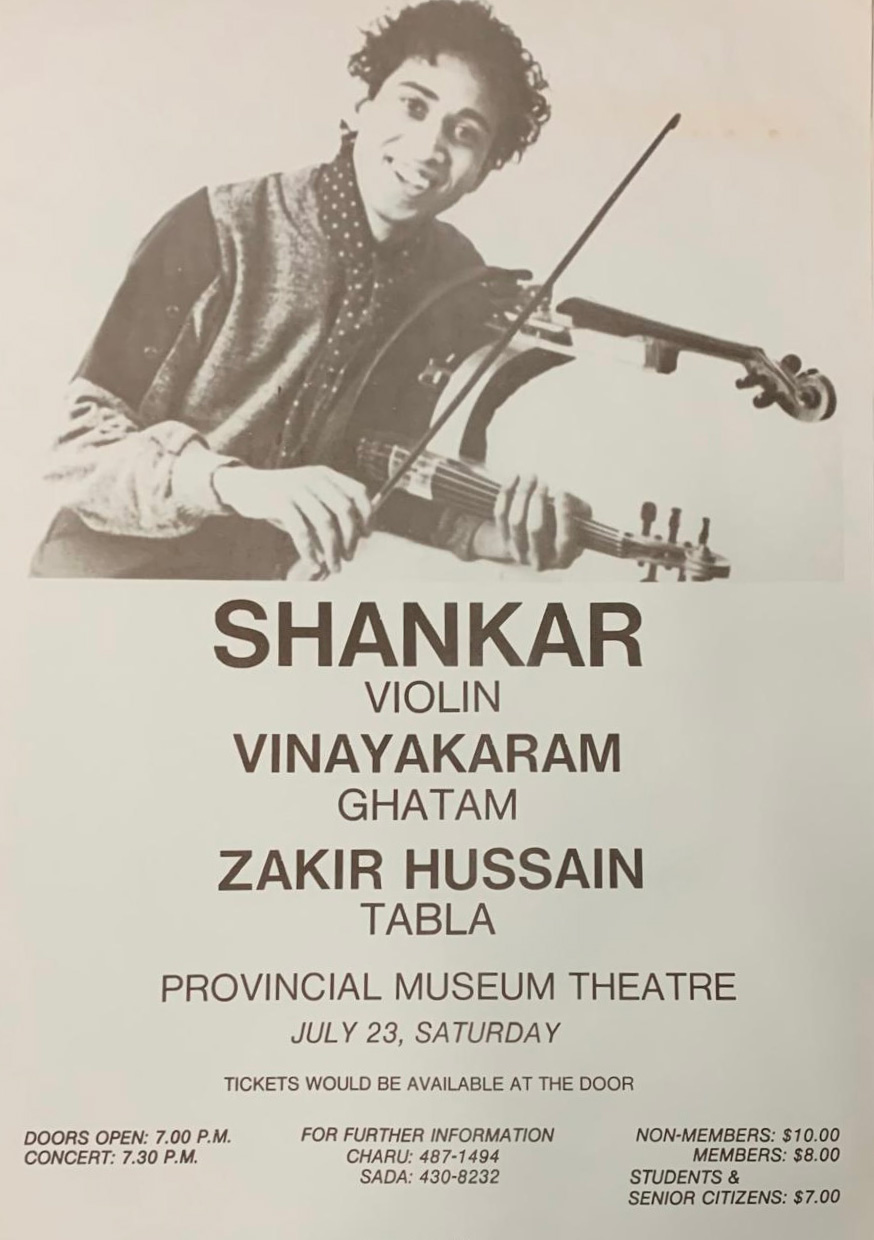
L. Shankar toured extensively with Vikku Vinayakram and Zakir Hussain during the 1980s and 1990s.

Shankar released several Indian classical albums in the 1990s including Nobody Told Me (1990), Pancha Nadai Pallavi (1990), Soul Searcher (1990) and Raga Aberi (1995). His Pancha Nadai Pallavi peaked at No. 9 on the Billboard top ten world music charts for three consecutive months – making it the first traditional Indian record ever hit those charts. The album consists of two tracks, the first is the rendition of ragam "Sankarabharanam" on the double violin and vocal without percussion and the second accompanied by Zakir Hussain on tabla and Vikku Vinayakram on ghatam. ECM Reviewer Tyron Grillo describes Shankar's playing as "a language of the utmost depth and beauty" and remarks that while traditionalists in the Carnatic music sphere may find Shankar's modern touches unconventional, "the music soars in ways that far outsoar its criticism." In 1995, Shankar released Raga Aberi, a rendition of ragam "Abheri", featuring his original composition set in a 9 1/2 beat cycle. Within the same year, the album garnered a Grammy Award nomination in the "Best World Music Album" category.

=== 1995–2006: WOMAD & special projects ===
Shankar's band collaborated in Peter Gabriel's 1995 WOMAD shows in Spain and toured globally, performing in several humanitarian events including The Concert for Global Harmony, Fiddlefest (a benefit for the Harlem Center For Strings) and Nelson Mandela's 80th Birthday celebrations. During this period, Shankar subsequently released the pop-oriented album One in a Million (2001) and the world music album Celestial Body (2004). Shankar wrote 'Palaces' as a song dedicated to children worldwide. The song was performed in Peter Gabriel's Secret World Tour and the second annual World Peace Music Awards in San Francisco's Civic Center Plaza, to benefit all the orphans of war and terrorism. In September 2004, he received the World Peace Music Award and in that same year, he composed and performed vocals and played the double violin on Mel Gibson's The Passion of the Christ, along with composers Jack Lenz and John Debney.

Shankar has also performed with Elton John, Eric Clapton, Phil Collins, Bruce Springsteen, Van Morrison, Yoko Ono, Stewart Copeland, John Waite, Charly García, Steve Vai, Ginger Baker, Nils Lofgren, Jonathan Davis and The SFA and Sting.

== Legacy ==
Music critic Jerry Ozipko described L. Shankar as "having improvised some of the most daring, exuberant, and technically proficient music imaginable" on the violin while Simon Dove, from Bazaar Magazine said Shankar's "phenomenal capacity for improvisation remains unsurpassed." According to Downbeat's Critics Poll, he was listed fourth among Established Violinists, and came in second in the "Talent Deserving Wider Recognition" division in 1978. Music critic Kevin O' Hare from The Republican wrote that "Shankar not only plays with breathtaking speed, he's also mastered the art of dynamics, letting the instrument breathe and taking advantage of the violin's full tonal qualities."

"Two Shankars, one Ravi Shankar and one L.Shankar are probably the best known Indian names in world music. One familiarised the Hindustani sitar, the other took Carnatic raga music through his double violin and voice to every known idiom from classical, to rock and roll, to jazz to EDM creating music that defies definition." — Times of India, 2019

== Discography ==
- Shakti (with Shakti) (1975)
- A Handful of Beauty (with Shakti) (1976)
- Natural Elements (with Shakti) (1977)
- Violin Ecstasy (1978)
- Touch Me There (1979)
- Who's to Know (1980)
- Vision (1984)
- Song for Everyone (1985)
- The Epidemics (1986)
- Do What You Do (1986)
- Eye Catcher (1987)
- Galaxy (1989)
- Pancha Nadai Pallavi (1989)
- M.R.C.S (1989)
- Nobody Told Me (1990)
- Soul Searcher (1990)
- Raga Aberi (1995)
- Enlightenment (1999)
- Eternal Light (2000)
- One in a Million (with Gingger Shankar) (2001)
- Celestial Body (2004)
- Open the Door (2007)
- In a Box (2012)
- The Revelation (2013)
- Champion (2014)
- Transcend (2015)
- Face to Face (2019)
- Chepleeri Dream (2020)
- Christmas from India (2021)
- Over The Stars (2024)
- Full Moon (2024)

== Filmography ==
- The Last Temptation of Christ (1988) (double violin)
- Bombay Jazz (1992, documentary)
- Secret World Live (1994) (double violin, backing vocals)
- Queen of the damned (film) (2002) (double violin)
- The Passion of the Christ (2004) (vocals, double violin)
- Heroes (2006–2009, TV series) (vocals)
