= One in a Million (Trixter song) =

Single by Trixter

from the album Trixter
- Released: February 1991
- Recorded: September 1989
- Genre: Glam metal; hard rock
- Length: 5:05 (album version)
- Label: MCA
- Songwriter(s): Steve Brown; Bill Wray; Jim Wray
- Producer(s): Bill Wray

Trixter singles chronology
"Give It to Me Good" (1990)	"One in a Million" (1991)	"Surrender" (1991)

"One in a Million is a song by American rock band Trixter. Written by guitarist Steve Brown with Bill and Jim Wray, the song was released as the second single from the band's self-titled debut.

While not as successful as previous single "Give It to Me Good", "One in a Million" was still a modest success, peaking at #75 and #33 on the Billboard Hot 100 and Mainstream Rock charts, respectively.

== Track listing ==
CD single

No.	Title	Length
1.	"One in a Million" (Radio Edit)	4:55
2.	"One in a Million" (Video Edit)	4:30

"Hit Radio Edit" single

No.	Title	Length
1.	"One in a Million" (Hit Radio Edit)	4:12
2.	"One in a Million" (Video Edit)	4:30
3.	"One in a Million" (Album Radio Edit)	4:55

== Charts ==
Chart (1991)	Peak position
US Billboard Hot 100	75
US Album Rock Tracks (Billboard)	33

== Personnel ==
- Peter "Pete" Loran – lead vocals
- Steve Brown – lead guitar, backing vocals
- P.J. Farley – bass guitar, backing vocals
- Mark "Gus" Scott – drums, backing vocals
