= Zappa Records =

American record label

Zappa Records is an American record label based in Los Angeles which was founded by Frank Zappa in 1977. It was mostly inactive during the 1980s and 1990s, but was revived in 2006 by the Zappa Family Trust.

== History ==
In May 1976, Zappa ended his relationship with manager and business partner Herb Cohen. The pair had co-owned DiscReet Records which was distributed by Warner Bros. Records. In March 1977 Zappa delivered four albums (five full length LPs) to Warner to complete his recording contract. Warner failed to pay Zappa upon the delivery of the recordings, in violation of their contractual agreement. Upon completion of the contract Zappa and Warner parted ways, while initiating a series of lawsuits.

Around mid 1977, Zappa founded Zappa Records, and negotiated a deal with Phonogram Inc., to distribute the label's releases in the United States and Canada. Under this agreement Zappa planned to release a four-LP box set titled Läther (pronounced "Leather".) The album was scheduled for release on Halloween, October 31, 1977, but production was cancelled at the test pressing stage. Zappa and Phonogram were forced to shelve the package following a legal threat from Warner. The four individual albums delivered to Warner in March 1977 and the four-LP Läther package have much of the same material but each also has unique content.

The first release by Zappa Records was Sheik Yerbouti in May 1979. This was soon followed by the dystopian rock opera Joe's Garage later in the year. The Joe's Garage project initially had to be released in two parts. The first was a single LP, Joe's Garage, Act I (September 1979), followed by a two-LP set Joe's Garage, Acts II and III (November 1979.) Outside the US and Canada, these albums were released by CBS Records.

The album Touch Me There, by L. Shankar, was also released on Zappa Records in 1979. Frank Zappa produced the album, sang, and co-wrote some of the songs.

In early 1980, Phonogram refused to distribute the Zappa single I Don't Wanna Get Drafted in the United States, though they did distribute the record in Canada. According to Zappa, this was because a Phonogram executive objected to the lyrics. The song criticized US president Jimmy Carter's reintroduction of the military draft. Phonogram president Robert Sherwood disputed Zappa's version of the story, insisting that they did not want to release a single without the support of a full-length album. Zappa distributed the single independently in the US and elsewhere through CBS Records.

In 1981, Zappa founded Barking Pumpkin Records with distribution by CBS Records.

In 2006, the Zappa Records label was revived with the release of Dweezil Zappa's Go with What You Know and Frank Zappa's Imaginary Diseases and Trance-Fusion on Zappa Records, followed by The Dub Room Special (2007), One Shot Deal (2008) and Feeding the Monkies At Ma Maison (2011).

In 2012, the Zappa Family Trust regained control of Frank Zappa's recorded output and made a distribution deal with Universal Music Enterprises to reissue the recordings on the Zappa and Barking Pumpkin labels.

== Artists ==
Former

Artist	Year(s) signed	Albums released on Zappa	Notes
Frank Zappa	—	6	Died December 4, 1993 (aged 52), due to prostate cancer.
L. Shankar	1979	1	
Z	1995	1	Consisted of Dweezil and Ahmet Zappa. Previously released Shampoohorn on Barking Pumpkin Records.
Dweezil Zappa	2006	1	

== Catalog ==
Year	Artist	Title	Peak chart positions			RIAA Certification (sales thresholds)
Year	Artist	Title	US	US Indie	US Heat	RIAA Certification (sales thresholds)
1979	Frank Zappa	Sheik Yerbouti	#21			
1979	Frank Zappa	Joe's Garage	#27 #53			
1979	L. Shankar	Touch Me There				
1996	Z	Music for Pets				
2006	Frank Zappa	Imaginary Diseases				
2006	Frank Zappa	Trance-Fusion				
2006	Dweezil Zappa	Go with What You Know				
2006	Frank Zappa	The MOFO Project/Object				
2007	Frank Zappa	The Dub Room Special				
2008	Frank Zappa	One Shot Deal				
2009	Frank Zappa	Lumpy Money				
2010	Frank Zappa	Congress Shall Make No Law...				
2011	Frank Zappa	Feeding the Monkies At Ma Maison				
2012	Captain Beefheart	Bat Chain Puller				
