= John McLaughlin discography =

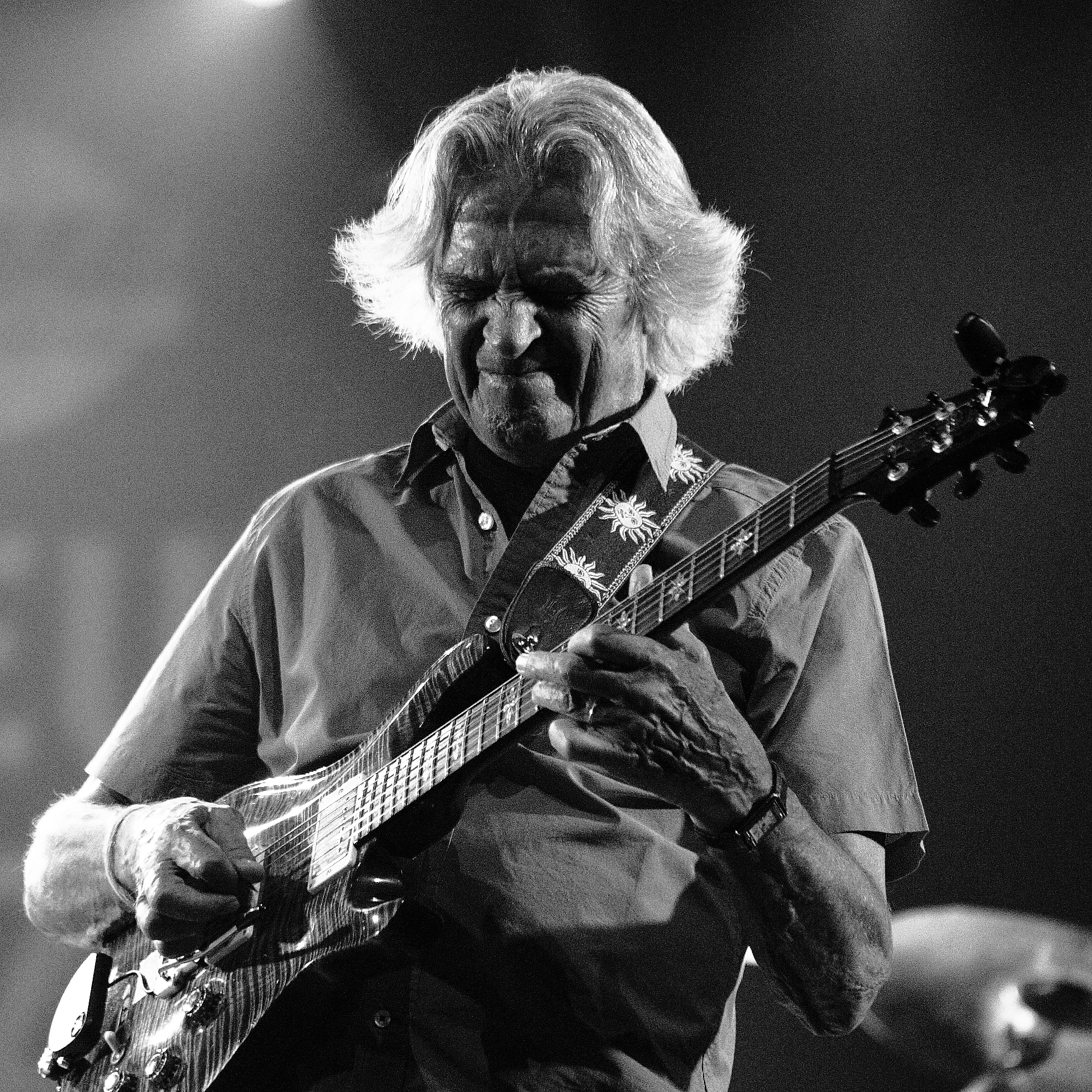
- McLaughlin performing in France, 2016
- Studio albums: 18
- Live albums: 8
- Compilation albums: 1
- Collaborative albums: 4

The following is a John McLaughlin discography, grouped by albums released under his name, albums from his group Mahavishnu Orchestra, his group Shakti, and albums where he is a session player on other artists' releases.

== Solo albums ==
Title	Album details	Peak chart positions							
Title	Album details	US	US Jazz	US Top Jazz	AUS	GER	NZL	SWE	JPN
Extrapolation	Released: 1969; Label: Marmalade, Polydor Records; Formats: CD, LP, digital download	152	—	—	—	—	—	—	—
Devotion	Released: September 1970; Label: Douglas Records; Formats: CD, LP, digital download	—	—	—	—	—	—	—	—
My Goal's Beyond	Released: June 1971; Label: Douglas Records; Formats: CD, LP, CS, digital download	194	—	34	38	48	—	—	—
Electric Guitarist	Released: 1978; Label: Columbia Records; Formats: CD, LP, CS, digital download	105	6	—	73	—	38	40	—
Electric Dreams	Released: 1979; Label: Columbia Records; Formats: CD, LP, digital download	147	14	—	75	—	27	—	—
Belo Horizonte	Released: 1981; Label: Warner Music; Formats: CD, LP, digital download	172	11	—	—	—	—	—	—
Music Spoken Here	Released: 1982; Label: Warner Music; Formats: CD, LP, digital download	—	24	—	—	—	—	—	—
Que Alegria	Released: 7 April 1992; Label: Verve Records; Formats: CD, digital download	—	—	—	5	—	—	—	—
Time Remembered: John McLaughlin Plays Bill Evans	Released: 9 November 1993; Label: Verve Records; Formats: CD, digital download	—	—	—	—	—	—	—	—
After the Rain	Released: 1995; Label: Verve Records; Formats: CD, digital download	—	—	9	—	—	—	—	—
The Promise	Released: 21 December 1995; Label: Verve Records; Formats: CD, LP, digital download	—	—	4	—	—	—	—	92
The Heart of Things	Released: 1997; Label: Verve Records; Formats: CD, digital download	—	—	4	—	—	—	—	—
Thieves and Poets	Released: 14 October 2003; Label: Verve Records; Formats: CD, LP, digital download	—	—	20	—	—	—	—	—
Industrial Zen	Released: 22 May 2006; Label: Verve Records; Formats: CD, digital download	—	—	9	—	—	—	—	—
Floating Point	Released: 20 May 2008; Label: Abstract Logix; Formats: CD, digital download	—	—	14	—	—	—	—	—
To the One with The 4th Dimension	Released: 20 April 2010; Label: Abstract Logix; Formats: CD, digital download	—	27	—	—	—	—	—	—
Now Here This with The 4th Dimension	Released: 16 October 2012; Label: Abstract Logix; Formats: CD, digital download	—	25	—	—	—	—	—	—
Black Light with The 4th Dimension	Released: 18 September 2015; Label: Abstract Logix; Formats: CD	—	14	—	—	—	—	—	—
Liberation Time	Released: 16 July 2021; Label: Abstract Logix; Formats: CD, Vinyl, digital download	—	—	—	—	—	—	—	—
Music for Abandoned Heights	Released: 9 January 2026; Label: IMPEX Records; Formats: CD, Vinyl, SACD	—	—	—	—	—	—	—	—
"—" denotes a recording that did not chart or was not released in that territory.

== Collaborative albums ==
Title	Album details	Peak chart positions									Certification
Title	Album details	US	US Jazz	US Top Jazz	AUS	GER	AUT	FRA	NOR	UK	Certification
Where Fortune Smiles with John Surman, Dave Holland, Karl Berger, and Stu Martin	Released: 1971; Label: Dawn Records; Formats: CD	—	—	—	—	—	—	—	—	—	
Love Devotion Surrender with Carlos Santana	Released: 20 July 1973; Label: Columbia Records; Formats: CD, digital download	14	—	—	10	26	12	—	19	7	US: Gold
Passion, Grace and Fire with Al Di Meola and Paco de Lucía	Released: 23 March 1983; Label: Philips; Formats: LP, CD, digital download	171	9	23	—	35	—	—	—	—	
The Guitar Trio with Al Di Meola and Paco de Lucía	Released: 15 October 1996; Label: Verve Records; Formats: LP, CD, digital download	—	—	1	—	55	27	21	—	—	
Paco and John Live at Montreux 1987 with Paco de Lucía	Released: 24 June 2016; Label: Verycords; Format: LP, CD	—	—	—	—	—	—	—	—	—	
Is That So? with Shankar Mahadevan and Zakir Hussain	Released: 17 January 2020; Label: Abstract Logix; Format: LP, CD, digital download	—	—	—	—	—	—	—	—	—	
"—" denotes a recording that did not chart or was not released in that territory.

== Live albums ==
Title	Album details	Peak chart positions									
Title	Album details	US	US Jazz	US Top Jazz	US Cont Jazz	GER	NLD	AUT	NZL	FRA	JPN
Friday Night in San Francisco with Al Di Meola and Paco de Lucía	Released: 10 August 1981; Label: Philips; Formats: CD, digital download	97	6	—	—	22	66	5	48	154	—
Concerto for Guitar & Orchestra "The Mediterranean" – Duos for Guitar & Piano with London Symphony Orchestra and Katia Labeque	Released: 1988; Label: CBS; Formats: CD, digital download	—	—	—	—	—	—	—	—	—	—
Live at the Royal Festival Hall	Released: 27 November 1989; Label: JMT Productions; Formats: CD, LP	—	—	—	3	—	—	—	—	—	—
Tokyo Live	Released: 1993; Label: Verve Records; Formats: CD, digital download	—	—	11	—	—	—	—	—	—	—
The Heart of Things: Live in Paris	Released: 3 October 2000; Label: Universal, Verve Records; Formats: CD, digital download	—	—	25	—	—	—	—	—	—	—
Montreux Concerts	Released: 22 December 2003; Label: Warner Music; Formats: 17-CD box set	—	—	—	—	—	—	—	—	—	—
Official Pirate: The Best of the American Tour 2007 with The 4th Dimension	Released: 13 September 2007; Label: Abstract Logix; Formats: CD-R	—	—	—	—	—	—	—	—	—	—
Five Peace Band Live with Chick Corea	Released: 28 April 2009; Label: Concord Records; Formats: 2CD, digital download	—	4	3	—	—	—	—	—	168	118
The Boston Record with The 4th Dimension	Released: 18 March 2014; Label: Abstract Logix; Formats: CD, digital download	—	18	—	—	—	—	—	—	—	—
Paco and John Live at Montreux 1987 with Paco de Lucía	Released: 24 June 2016; Label: Verycords; Format: LP, CD	—	—	—	—	—	—	—	—	—	—
Live at Ronnie Scott's with The 4th Dimension	Released: 15 September 2017; Label: Abstract Logix; Formats: CD	—	—	—	—	—	—	—	—	—	—
Live in San Francisco with The 4th Dimension	Released: 21 September 2018; Label: Abstract Logix; Formats: CD	—	—	—	—	—	—	—	—	—	—
Live at Montreux Jazz Festival 2022	Released: 8 August 2025	—	—	—	—	—	—	—	—	—	—
"—" denotes a recording that did not chart or was not released in that territory.

== Other appearances ==
Album	Year	Notes	Ref.
Twice as Much – Own Up	1966	guitar	
Gordon Beck – Experiments with Pops	1968	guitar	
Miles Davis – In a Silent Way	1969	electric guitar	
The Tony Williams Lifetime – Emergency!	1969	guitar	
Wayne Shorter – Super Nova	1969	"Supernova", "Swee-Pea", "Water Babies" and "Capricorn"	
Sandy Brown and His Gentleman Friends – Hair at Its Hairiest	1969	guitar	
Miroslav Vitous – Infinite Search	1969	guitar	
Miles Davis – Bitches Brew	1970	electric guitar	
Jack Bruce – Things We Like	1970	guitar	
The Tony Williams Lifetime – Turn It Over	1970	guitar	
Miroslav Vitous – Purple	1970	guitar	
Joe Farrell – Follow Your Heart	1970	guitar	
Duffy Power – Innovations	1970	guitar	
Graham Bond – Solid Bond	1970	guitar, live with the Graham Bond Quartet, 1963; "Ho Ho Country Kicking Blues", The Grass Is Greener", "Doxy"	
Larry Coryell – Spaces	1970	guitar	
Miles Davis – A Tribute to Jack Johnson	1971	electric guitar	
Miles Davis – Live-Evil	1971	electric guitar	
Carla Bley and Paul Haines – Escalator Over the Hill	1971	guitar	
James Taylor – One Man Dog	1972	guitar	
Miles Davis – On the Corner	1972	electric guitar on "On the Corner; New York Girl; Thinkin' One Thing and Doin' Another; Vote for Miles"	
Santana – Welcome	1973	guitar on "Flame – Sky"	
Wayne Shorter – Moto Grosso Feio	1974	12 string guitar	
Miles Davis – Big Fun	1974	guitar on "Great Expectations/Orange Lady", "Recollections", "Go Ahead John", "The Little Blue Frog" and "Yaphet"	
Miles Davis – Get Up with It	1974	guitar on "Honky Tonk"	
Stanley Clarke – Journey to Love	1975	guitar	
Larry Coryell – Planet End	1975	guitar	
Stanley Clarke – School Days	1976	acoustic guitar on "Desert Song"	
Miles Davis – Circle in the Round	1979	guitar on "Guinnevere"	
Miles Davis – Directions	1980	guitar	
Paco de Lucía – Castro Marín	1981	guitar	
Miles Davis – You're Under Arrest	1985	guitar on "Ms. Morrisine", "Katia Prelude" and "Katia"	
Bill Evans – The Alternative Man	1985	guitar	
Herbie Hancock – Round Midnight (Soundtrack)	1986	guitar on "Body and Soul" and "Bérangère's Nightmare"	
Dexter Gordon – The Other Side of Round Midnight	1986	guitar	
Katia and Marielle Labeque – Gladrags	1986	producer	
Zakir Hussain with Jan Garbarek and Hariprasad Chaurasia – Making Music	1986	acoustic guitar	
Miles Davis – Aura	1989	guitar	
Katia and Marielle Labeque – Love of Colours	1990	piano, programming, producer	
Carlos Santana and Bill Laswell - Divine Light: Reconstructions & Mix Translation	2001	guitar, piano	
Leni Stern – Finally the Rain Has Come	2002	guitar	
Ithamara Koorax – Someday	2002	guitar	
Miroslav Vitous – Universal Syncopations	2003	guitar	
Miles Davis – The Cellar Door Sessions	2005	electric guitar	
Santana – Hymns for Peace: Live at Montreux 2004	2007	guitar	
Hadrien Feraud – Hadrian Feraud	2007	composer	
Gary Husband – Dirty & Beautiful (Volume 1)	2010	guitar on "Dreams in Blue"	
