= My Goal's Beyond =

Studio album by John McLaughlin
- Released: June 1971
- Recorded: New York City, March 1971
- Genre: Jazz fusion, world fusion
- Length: 43:27
- Label: Douglas
- Producer: John McLaughlin

John McLaughlin chronology
Where Fortune Smiles (1971)	My Goal's Beyond (1971)	The Inner Mounting Flame (with Mahavishnu Orchestra) (1971)

John McLaughlin solo chronology
Where Fortune Smiles (1971)	My Goal’s Beyond (1971)	Electric Guitarist (1978)

Professional ratings
Review scores
Source	Rating
Allmusic	5/5 stars
Christgau's Record Guide	B
All About Jazz	
The Rolling Stone Jazz Record Guide	4/5 stars
The Penguin Guide to Jazz Recordings	3/4 stars

My Goal's Beyond is the third solo album (after Extrapolation and Devotion) by guitarist John McLaughlin. The album was originally released in 1971 on Douglas Records in the US. It was later reissued by Douglas/Casablanca (1976), Elektra/Musician (1982), and in 1987 by Rykodisc on CD and LP.

This album marks the first chronological major stylistic change from McLaughlin, apart from his move to an acoustic guitar. The music is strongly influenced by music of India, and was dedicated to McLaughlin's spiritual leader, Indian guru Sri Chinmoy. Side one has two longer pieces for the whole band, including soprano saxophonist/flautist Dave Liebman, violinist Jerry Goodman and percussionists Airto and Badal Roy. Side two of the album features eight short compositions (five standards and three originals) played by McLaughlin on double-tracked acoustic guitars, with occasional punctuation on various cymbals by Billy Cobham.

== Track listing ==
Douglas – KZ 30766

Side one
No.	Title	Writer(s)	Length
1.	"Peace 1"	John McLaughlin	7:15
2.	"Peace 2"	John McLaughlin	12:18

Side two
No.	Title	Writer(s)	Length
1.	"Goodbye Pork Pie Hat"	Charles Mingus	3:15
2.	"Something Spiritual"	Dave Herman	3:35
3.	"Hearts and Flowers"	Theodore Moses Tobani	2:05
4.	"Phillip Lane"	John McLaughlin	3:35
5.	"Waltz for Bill Evans"	Chick Corea	2:00
6.	"Follow Your Heart"	John McLaughlin	3:17
7.	"Song for My Mother"	John McLaughlin	3:30
8.	"Blue in Green"	Miles Davis/Bill Evans	2:37
Total length:			43:27

== Personnel ==
- John McLaughlin – acoustic guitar
- Charlie Haden – double bass
- Jerry Goodman – violin
- Mahalakshmi (Eve McLaughlin) – tanpura (Indian drone instrument)
- Dave Liebman – flute, soprano saxophone
- Billy Cobham – drums
- Airto Moreira – percussion
- Badal Roy – tabla

== Charts ==
Chart (1972)	Peak position
Australian Albums (Kent Music Report)	38
German Albums (Offizielle Top 100)	48
US Billboard 200	194

Chart (1982)	Peak position
US Top Jazz Albums (Billboard)	34

== See also ==
- John McLaughlin discography
