= The Guitar Trio =

Studio album by Paco de Lucía, Al Di Meola and John McLaughlin
- Released: 15 October 1996
- Recorded: May–July 1996
- Studio: Real World Studios, England
- Genre: New Flamenco; Jazz
- Length: 53:01
- Label: Verve
- Producer: Al Di Meola, John McLaughlin, Paco de Lucía

Paco de Lucía, Al Di Meola and John McLaughlin chronology
Passion, Grace and Fire (1983)	The Guitar Trio (1996)	Saturday Night in San Francisco (2022)

John McLaughlin chronology
The Promise (1995)	The Guitar Trio (1996)	The Heart of Things (1997)

Professional ratings
Review scores
Source	Rating
Allmusic	4/5 stars
All About Jazz	(not rated)
The Penguin Guide to Jazz Recordings	3/4 stars

The Guitar Trio is a reunion album by Al Di Meola, Paco de Lucía and John McLaughlin, released in 1996 after 13 years without playing together. This 1996 effort has three originals apiece from McLaughlin and Di Meola, two by de Lucía and a McLaughlin-Di Meola duet on "Manhã de Carnaval".

== Track listing ==
1. "La Estiba" (Paco de Lucía) – 5:51
2. "Beyond the Mirage" (Al Di Meola) – 6:10
3. "Midsummer Night" (John McLaughlin) – 4:36
4. "Manhã de Carnaval" (Luiz Bonfá, Antônio Maria) – 6:11
5. "Letter from India" (John McLaughlin) – 3:54
6. "Espiritu" (Al Di Meola) – 5:30
7. "Le Monastère dans les Montagnes" (John McLaughlin) – 6:15
8. "Azzura" (Al Di Meola) – 7:58
9. "Cardeosa" (Paco de Lucía) – 6:36

== Personnel ==
- Paco de Lucía – guitar (1-3,5,7-9) - plays a Hermanos Conde guitar
- Al Di Meola – guitar (tracks 1-4,6-9), percussion (6) - plays both Ovation and a Hermanos Conde guitar-percution/hands, shaker
- John McLaughlin – guitar (1-5,7-9) - uses a Wechter guitar, D'Addario strings and a Lawrence Fishman microphone

== Chart performance ==
Chart (1996)	Peak position
Hungarian Albums (MAHASZ)	7
US Billboard Top Jazz Albums	1
