= Saturday Night in San Francisco =

2022 live album

Live album by Al Di Meola, John McLaughlin, and Paco de Lucía
- Released: June 4, 2022
- Recorded: December 6, 1980
- Venue: Warfield Theatre
- Length: 50:35
- Label: Earmusic

Al Di Meola, John McLaughlin, and Paco de Lucía chronology
The Guitar Trio (1996)	Saturday Night in San Francisco (2022)

Saturday Night in San Francisco is a 2022 live album released as a follow-up to the 1981 live album Friday Night in San Francisco by Al Di Meola, John McLaughlin, and Paco de Lucía. The album consists of seven previously unreleased recordings that were thought to be lost. The album was recorded on Saturday, December 6, 1980, at Warfield Theatre in San Francisco, the night after Friday Night in San Francisco was recorded.

== Critical reception ==
Professional ratings
Review scores
Source	Rating
Jazzwise	4/5 stars

Andy Robson of Jazzwise found there to be "richer emphasis on De Lucia's work. Although bottom-billed, his work, especially rhythmically, cements the programme". Robson also felt that "Meeting of the Spirits" has "a more moderate pace, and crucially a range of dynamics not so prevalent in the other songs" and called the album overall "a vision from another time, another whole sound world, and of course De Lucia is sadly missed: but still a concert and a trio to savour".

== Track Listing, LP and CD ==
Saturday Night in San Francisco track listing, vinyl LP and CD releases
No.	Title	Length
1.	"Bill Graham Introduction"	0:29
2.	"Splendido Sundance"	7:08
3.	"One Word" (John McLaughlin)	5:43
4.	"Trilogy Suite" (Al Di Meola)	6:26
5.	"Monasterio de Sal" (Paco de Lucía)	5:08
6.	"El Pañuelo"	8:02
7.	"Meeting of the Spirits"	13:34
8.	"Orpheo Negro" (Available only on certain specific CD and vinyl LP releases)	4:05
Total length:		50:35

== Track Listing, SACD ==
Saturday Night in San Francisco track listing, SACD release only
No.	Title	Length
1.	"Bill Graham Introduction"	0:33
2.	"Splendido Sundance" (Al Di Meola)	7:04
3.	"One Word" (John McLaughlin)	5:42
4.	"Trilogy Suite" (Al Di Meola)	6:21
5.	"Monasterio de Sal" (Paco de Lucía)	5:13
6.	"El Pañuelo" (Paco de Lucía)	7:57
7.	"Meeting of the Spirits" (John McLaughlin)	13:32
8.	"Soniquete" (Paco de Lucía)	6:49
Total length:		53:11

== Charts ==
Chart performance for Saturday Night in San Francisco
Chart (2022)	Peak position
Austrian Albums (Ö3 Austria)	14
German Albums (Offizielle Top 100)	5
Scottish Albums (Official Charts)	59
Swiss Albums (Schweizer Hitparade)	20
UK Independent Albums (Official Charts)	16
UK Jazz & Blues Albums (Official Charts)	3
US Top Jazz Albums (Billboard)	7
