= Dominique Di Piazza =

French electric bass player

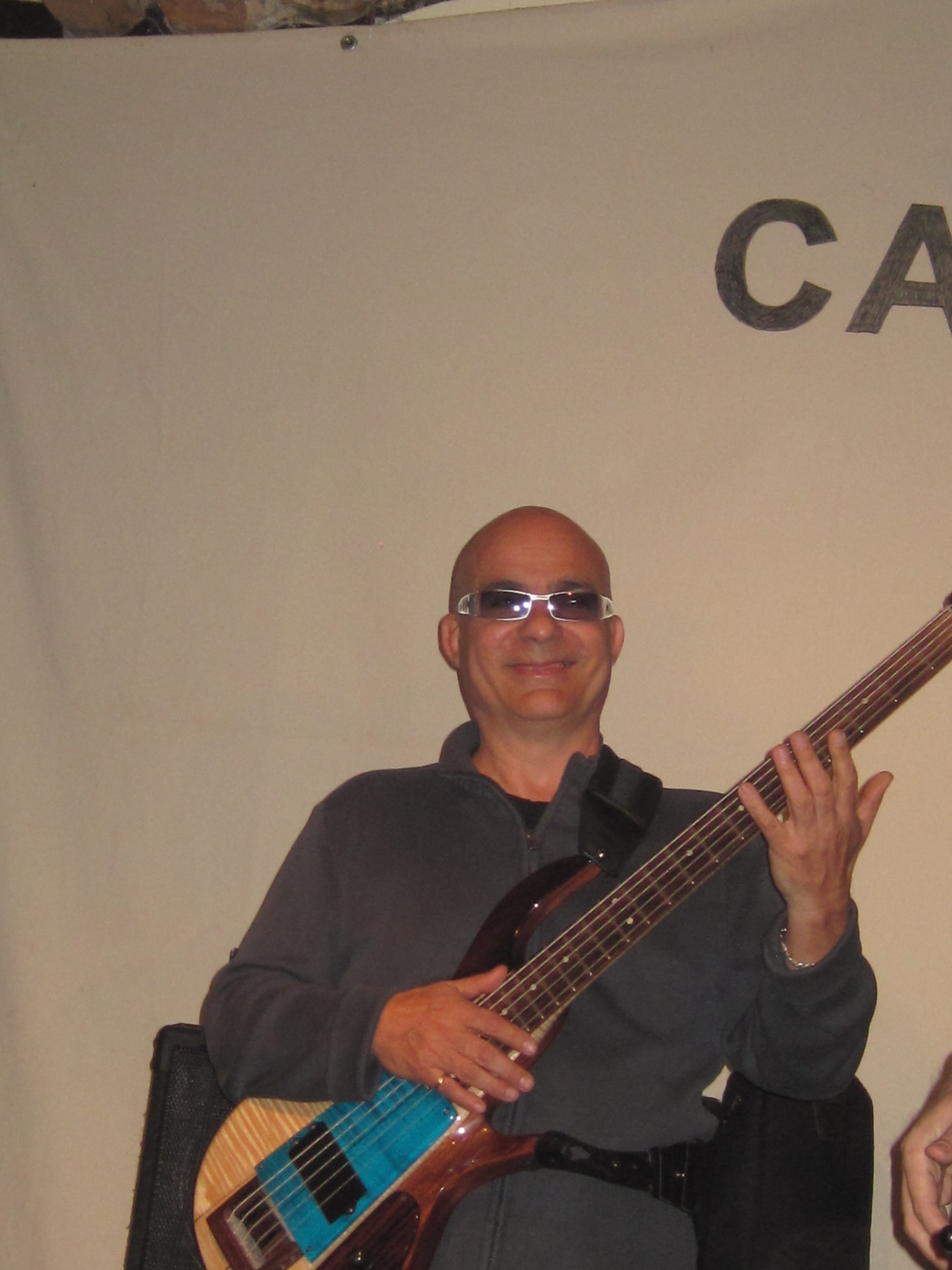
Dominique di Piazza, 2015

Dominique Di Piazza, born in Lyon, France, in 1959, is an electric bass player.

Di Piazza discovered the bass in 1979. Already a self-taught guitarist, Di Piazza developed a distinctive, but unorthodox 'closed palm' technique of picking with the right hand thumb, index, and middle fingers, giving him a speed not often heard in electric bass players.

A member of the John McLaughlin Trio" from 1991 to 1992, along with Trilok Gurtu a world tour of 300 concerts and an album Que Alegria. He influenced numerous bass players in Europe and the USA, such as Matthew Garrison, Adam Nitti, and Lucas Pickford.

In 2000, Di Piazza released the album Front Page (Sunnyside) with a group of the same name, consisting of Biréli Lagrène on Guitar and Dennis Chambers on Drums. In 2001 the album was awarded the Victory Music Award for the year's best jazz CD.

In 2003, he released Seven Steps To Heaven, a ten-track album recorded for the record label Wide Sound with Vic Juris, Giuseppe Continenza and Pietro Iodice, which ranked fourth of best-selling jazz albums on iTunes, while the single "Stella By Starlight” was in 2nd place.

In 2005 and 2006 Di Piazza toured in Réunion, Mauritius, Madagascar and 10 other countries in Africa, accompanied by Meddy Gerville - a pianist from Reunion, Jean-Marie Ecay on guitar, and drummer Horacio Hernandez. This tour led to a new CD called Jazz Amwin, which has been released independently.
