= Que Alegria =

Qué Alegría

Studio album by John McLaughlin
- Released: 1992
- Recorded: 29 November – 3 December 1991
- Studio: Studio Bauer, Ludwigsburg, Germany
- Genre: Jazz
- Length: 64:35
- Label: Verve
- Producer: John McLaughlin

John McLaughlin chronology
Live at the Royal Festival Hall (1989)	Qué Alegría (1992)	Time Remembered: John McLaughlin Plays Bill Evans (1993)

Professional ratings
Review scores
Source	Rating
Allmusic	3/5 stars
All About Jazz	
The Penguin Guide to Jazz Recordings	4/4 stars

Qué Alegría is an album by the John McLaughlin Trio, featuring percussionist Trilok Gurtu and bass guitarist Dominique Di Piazza. Di Piazza is replaced by Kai Eckhardt on two tracks. It was released on the Verve label in 1992. The album reached 1992 number 5 in the Billboard Top Contemporary Jazz Albums chart.

== Reception ==
Allmusic awarded the album with 3 stars and its review by Richard S. Ginell states: "McLaughlin sounds rejuvenated and refreshed in this format, as he switches between acoustic guitar and a guitar synthesizer attachment that softens and rounds his attacks while creating some luminous timbres and textures. McLaughlin's on-again, off-again Indian kick rises prominently into view here as Trilok Gurtu's role broadens into that of an all-purpose percussionist, producing some amazing sounds as backdrops".

== Track listing ==
All compositions by John McLaughlin except where noted.

1. "Belo Horizonte" – 6:35
2. "Baba" (Trilok Gurtu) – 6:51
3. "Reincarnation" – 11:52
4. "1 Nite Stand" – 5:25
5. "Marie" (Dominique Di Piazza) – 1:59
6. "Hijacked" – 8:35
7. "Mila Repa" – 7:31
8. "Qué Alegría" – 10:32
9. "3 Willows" – 5:14

== Personnel ==
- John McLaughlin – acoustic guitar, Photon Midi interface
- Trilok Gurtu – percussion
- Dominique Di Piazza – 4 string and 5 string bass guitars
- Kai Eckhardt – bass guitar on "Reincarnation" and "1 Nite Stand"

== Charts ==
Chart	Peak position
US Top Contemporary Jazz Albums (Billboard)	5
