= Tokyo Live (John McLaughlin album) =

Live album by The Free Spirits Featuring John McLaughlin
- Released: 1994
- Recorded: 16, 18 December 1993
- Venue: Blue Note, Tokyo, Japan
- Genre: Jazz fusion
- Label: Verve
- Producer: John McLaughlin

John McLaughlin chronology
Time Remembered: John McLaughlin Plays Bill Evans (1993)	Tokyo Live (1994)	After the Rain (1994)

Professional ratings
Review scores
Source	Rating
Allmusic	4/5 stars
All About Jazz	(mixed)
The Penguin Guide to Jazz Recordings	3/4 stars

Tokyo Live is a live jazz album released by The Free Spirits (guitarist John McLaughlin, organist Joey DeFrancesco and drummer Dennis Chambers) on Verve in 1994.

The album was produced by John McLaughlin; the executive producer was Jean-Philippe Allard. It was recorded live on 16 and 18 December 1993 at the Blue Note Tokyo jazz club in Tokyo, Japan.

== Track listing ==
(All pieces composed by John McLaughlin except "No Blues" by Miles Davis)

1. "1 Nite Stand" 7:05
2. "Hijacked" 10:25
3. "When Love is Far Away" 4:56
4. "Little Miss Valley" 10:56
5. "Juju at the Crossroads" 5:15
6. "Vukovar" 12:11
7. "No Blues" 4:27
8. "Mattinale" 19:42

== Personnel ==
- John McLaughlin - guitar
- Joey DeFrancesco - Hammond XB-3 organ, trumpet
- Dennis Chambers - drums

== Charts ==
Chart (1994)	Peak position
US Top Jazz Albums (Billboard)	11
