= Binky McKenzie =

Jazz/blues musician who killed his parents (born 1947/8)

- Also known as: Binky McKenzie
- Born: Michael Keith Winston McKenzie; 1947/1948; British Guiana
- Genres: Jazz, blues
- Occupation: Musician
- Years active: 1960s

Michael Keith Winston "Binky" McKenzie is a former musician. During the 1960s he played and recorded with several musicians such as Alexis Korner, John McLaughlin, Pete Brown, Denny Laine, Vincent Crane and Duffy Power. In 1972 he was convicted for the manslaughter of his parents and brother-in-law and detained at Broadmoor Hospital.

== Early life ==
His parents were UK immigrants from Guyana, formerly British Guiana. Accompanied by his mother Edna, he arrived in the UK from British Guiana on 18 April 1950 as a two-year-old infant. His father, Winston McKenzie, was a jazz bass player. His sister, Candy McKenzie, went on to have a successful music career as a backing singer and recorded with a number of artistes including Bob Marley, Leonard Cohen, Whitney Houston and Diana Ross.

== Career ==
In late 1966, McKenzie joined Hughie Flint as a member of Alexis Korner's short-lived band Free at Last, replacing Cliff Barton on bass guitar. On 31 January 1967, at Philips Studios, Marble Arch, London, the trio recorded "Rosie," which was released as a single on the Fontana label in April 1967 (TF 817). Flint remembered McKenzie as "an amazing guy, very young and undisciplined".

In the mid 1960s, McKenzie became friends with John McLaughlin. In January 1967, they played together on the Duffy Power composition "Just Stay Blue". McLaughlin recommended McKenzie as a bass player to Miles Davis. McLaughlin composed the jazz blues number "Binky's Beam" as a tribute to McKenzie. It has an unusual 19/8 time signature and appears on McLaughlin's 1969 album Extrapolation. In the liner notes McLaughlin writes, “This is dedicated to Binky McKenzie, one of the greatest bass players."

During this period McKenzie was dating Anne Fraser, sister of Andy Fraser, who went on to become the bass player and songwriter with the group Free. McKenzie would often visit the Frasers' home in Horndean Close, Roehampton, London. Fraser would leave his own bass guitar lying around the house in the hope that McKenzie would pick it up and play. Fraser always maintained that McKenzie had a significant influence on his own bass playing. In November 2014, Andy Fraser said of McKenzie:

“He was an incredible bass player. And when I say incredible, I mean incredible. He was like the next Jimi Hendrix on bass. But he had some kind of chip on his shoulder and drugs seemed to make it worse. I would listen to him (at home) from the other room and learn all I could, absorb every little thing. He was literally a genius and he was playing with people like Alexis Korner, taking over from Jack Bruce, and he was like, wow, this guy is something else. His younger brother played guitar and both of them introduced me to lots of other musicians in their area, North London”

McKenzie also recorded sessions with Pete Brown during August 1967 and January 1968. These recordings are held in the archives at the British Library and include an early version of the track "Politician" which subsequently appeared on the Cream album Wheels of Fire.

Brown later recalled: “I thought he was way ahead of his time. He had a bit of a chip on his shoulder, because at the time, black musicians had a hard time of it. The openings were so few, it didn’t matter how good you were. But he was such an innovator on the bass. Binky did drugs. Not much, just personal use. But his parents got very heavy about it and called the police in (during 1968) and Binky did time. When he came out of the ‘nick’ (prison), he was one very, very angry young man indeed.”

In 1969 McLaughlin also referred to this initial period of incarceration in the liner notes to Extrapolation, saying at the time he felt that Binky had been “unjustly jailed with his brother Bunny”.

== Siege at Olive Road ==
On Thursday 29 July 1971 at the family home in Cricklewood, North West London, McKenzie went on a violent rampage. He killed his mother Edna, father Winston, and brother-in-law Richard Sims. All victims were stabbed multiple times. His younger sister Candy was also stabbed and seriously injured but survived the attack.

=== Sentence ===
At the Old Bailey in March 1972, McKenzie was found guilty on three counts of manslaughter on the grounds of diminished responsibility.
