= Where Fortune Smiles =

1971 free jazz studio album

Studio album by John McLaughlin, John Surman, Dave Holland, Karl Berger and Stu Martin
- Released: 1971
- Recorded: May 1970
- Studio: Apostolic, New York City
- Genre: Free jazz
- Length: 34:53
- Label: Dawn; DNLS 3018
- Producer: McLaughlin, Surman, Berger, Martin & Holland

John McLaughlin chronology
Devotion (1970)	Where Fortune Smiles (1971)	My Goal's Beyond (1971)

Dave Holland chronology
Where Fortune Smiles (1971)	A.R.C. (1971)

Where Fortune Smiles is a free jazz LP credited to John McLaughlin, John Surman, Dave Holland, Karl Berger, and Stu Martin, recorded in 1970 and released on Dawn Records in 1971.

== Background ==
As released in 1971 on Dawn records, and a subsequent 1975 release on Pye, the album was credited to all participating musicians, with no one receiving top billing. With the reissue on CD in 1993, the album was retroactively credited to McLaughlin alone, a move suggested to have been for "marketing purposes only". Composition credits and solo times are shared more or less equally between McLaughlin and Surman, and McLaughlin is not understood to have acted in a leadership capacity for the sessions. The two quieter duets, "Earth Bound Hearts" and "Where Fortune Smiles," were recorded because of complaints from neighbors of the studio over how loud the group was playing.

A one-off studio record between 5 accomplished musicians who never recorded as a group subsequently, the two studio efforts necessary to complete the album were fit in between and/or after other recordings by the musicians: John Surman working with Barre Phillips and Stu Martin in “The Trio” (Dawn LP – DNLS 3006), John McLaughlin working with Miles Davis, Karl touring with Don Cherry in Europe, and Dave also working with Miles.

== Critical reception ==
Professional ratings
Review scores
Source	Rating
Allmusic	3/5 stars
Christgau's Record Guide	B+
The Penguin Guide to Jazz Recordings	4/4 stars

Jazz critic Scott Yanow wrote: “McLaughlin's raw sound was starting to take shape by this time and his impeccable chops are on full display. So too are those of the underrated vibraphonist Karl Berger and, of course, soprano saxophonist Surman. The foundation is held loosely in place by bassist Dave Holland and drummer Stu Martin. It's a challenging but interesting listen, especially given McLaughlin's later success and popularity.” Robert Christgau stated "Recorded in New York in 1969, when McLaughlin's studio appearances were amazing everyone from Jimi to Buddy to Miles, this prefigures Mahavishnu's fusion at an earlier, jazzier stage. Pretty intense. The rock guy (drummer Martin) sounds a lot more original than the jazz guys (keyboard player Berger and--especially--saxophonist Surman), but only the justifiably ubiquitous Holland (on bass) can keep up with McLaughlin. And believe me, even if in historical fact it's McLaughlin who's trying to keep up, that's how it sounds."

=== Reissues ===
Where Fortune Smiles was reissued on vinyl in 1975 by Pye Records (Pye 12103) with an alternative cover. It was first reissued on CD in 1993 on One Way Records (OW 29312), then on a re-mastered promo on BGO Records in 1993 – and officially in 1996 (BGO 191). The entire album is included on the 3-CD set John Surman: Glancing Backwards, the Dawn anthology. It was subsequently issued on CD by Esoteric Recordings in 2017 (ECLEC 2605), with a new mix by Ben Wiseman.

== Track listing ==
All tracks are written by John McLaughlin except as noted.

Side one
No.	Title	Writer(s)	Length
1.	"Glancing Backwards (for Junior)"	John Surman	8:54
2.	"Earth Bound Hearts"		4:15
3.	"Where Fortune Smiles"	Surman	4:01
Total length:			17:10

Side two
No.	Title	Length
1.	"New Place, Old Place"	10:24
2.	"Hope"	7:19
Total length:		17:43 34:53

== Personnel ==
- John McLaughlin – guitars
- John Surman – soprano saxophone, baritone saxophone, bass clarinet (1, 2, 4, 5)
- Dave Holland – upright bass (1, 4, 5)
- Karl Berger – vibraphone (1, 3–5)
- Stu Martin – drums (1, 4, 5)
- Dave Baker – engineer
