= Live at the Royal Festival Hall (John McLaughlin Trio album) =

Live album by John McLaughlin Trio
- Released: 1990
- Recorded: 27 November 1989
- Venue: Royal Festival Hall, London
- Genre: Jazz
- Length: 64:15
- Label: JMT; JMT 834 436
- Producer: Stefan F. Winter

John McLaughlin chronology
| Mediterranean Concerto (For Guitar and Orchestra) (1988) | Live at the Royal Festival Hall (1990) | Qué Alegría (1992) |

Professional ratings
Review scores
| Source | Rating |
|---|---|
| AllMusic | 4/5 stars |
| The Penguin Guide to Jazz Recordings | 3/4 stars |

Live at the Royal Festival Hall is an album by the John McLaughlin Trio, featuring percussionist Trilok Gurtu and bass guitarist Kai Eckhardt. It was recorded at the Royal Festival Hall in London on 27 November 1989 and was released on the JMT label in 1990. The album reached number 3 in the Billboard Top Contemporary Jazz Albums chart.

McLaughlin makes extensive use on this recording of the Photon guitar synthesiser, a setup whereby transducers mounted on an acoustic guitar are used to control a synthesiser bank via MIDI. This enables McLaughlin to invoke a range of sounds and effects normally the preserve of keyboard players, resulting in a greater variety of moods and textures than might be assumed from the line-up.

== Track listing ==
1. "Blue in Green" (Miles Davis) – 6:36
2. "Just Ideas" (Mitchel Forman)/"Jozy" – 5:32
3. "Florianopolis" – 15:13
4. "Pasha's Love" – 7:55
5. "Mother Tongues" – 19:21
6. "Blues For L.W." – 9:39

All compositions by John McLaughlin except where indicated

== Personnel ==
- John McLaughlin - acoustic guitar, Photon Midi interface
- Trilok Gurtu - percussion
- Kai Eckhardt - electric bass

== Chart performance ==
| Year | Chart | Position |
|---|---|---|
| 1990 | Billboard Top Contemporary Jazz Albums | 3 |
