= Black Light (John McLaughlin album) =

Studio album by John McLaughlin
- Released: 18 September 2015
- Recorded: March 2015
- Studio: Eastcote Studios, London; Mediastarz, Monaco
- Genre: Jazz
- Length: 46:57
- Label: Abstract Logix ABLX 050
- Producer: John McLaughlin

John McLaughlin chronology
Now Here This (2012)	Black Light (2015)	Liberation Time (2021)

Black Light is a studio album by British jazz guitarist John McLaughlin and his band the 4th Dimension. The album was recorded in March 2015 in London and Monaco and released in September 2015 via Abstract Logix. This is his third studio record with the 4th Dimension band.

== Background ==
John McLaughlin explained that the album pays several homages: "Here come the Jiis" is dedicated to the memory of musician U. Srinivas with whom he played for 14 years; the piece "Panditji" is a sign of respect to Pandit Ravi Shankar, with whom he studied under during the mid-1970s; and the composition "El Hombre que Sabià" is dedicated to the late flamenco musician Paco de Lucía. McLaughlin also noted that this album may be his final one.

== Reception ==
Professional ratings
Review scores
Source	Rating
Elmore Magazine	87/100
Glide Magazine	7/10
The Guardian	4/5 stars
The Irish Times	4/5 stars
Louder Sound	2.5/5 stars
PopMatters	7/10
DownBeat	4.5/5 stars

John Fordham of The Guardian wrote "They’re calling this latest album by the implausibly youthful 73-year-old guitar tornado John McLaughlin the work of “the Mahavishnu Orchestra of the 21st century” – a reference to the cult band McLaughlin formed in the 1970s to blend jazz, Indian music and high-energy electric fusion. His nine years with the 4th Dimension quartet – featuring the British pianist Gary Husband, bass guitarist Étienne M’Bappé and percussionist Ranjit Barot – have also had plenty of flying guitar breaks, anthemic themes, chattery Indo-scat and pin-sharp unison licks, but Black Light's emergence in October heralded a new maturity and even a rare spaciousness.... It's not just a guitar buff's album, but 4th Dimension's best work yet."

John Garrat of PopMatters stated "It’s a studio album so it’s bound to be a tamer animal. But McLaughlin can still let his fingers fly with remarkable dexterity while hanging onto a melody. The 4th Dimension remain as professional and precise as ever, particularly drummer Ranjit Barot who debatably has the most precarious and thereby the most important job of the band by keeping all the elements tied together."

Ira Kantor of Elmore Magazine noted "Throughout the album, as on Now Here This, you get the image of McLaughlin with his head bobbing, a smile on his face as his fingers work their magic. “El Hombre Que Sabia” is a tribute to flamenco giant Paco de Lucia, featuring fast-flying fingers across an acoustic guitar. It's also the softest track on the album and sounds like McLaughlin is trying to conjure up beautiful Friday Night in San Francisco vibes of yore... As a whole, Black Light brings more meat to McLaughlin's repertoire. It's great knowing his Mahavishnu Orchestra leanings will never fully disappear."

== Track listing ==
All tracks are written by John McLaughlin.

No.	Title	Length
1.	"Here Come the Jiis"	6:29
2.	"Clap Your Hand"	6:02
3.	"Being You Being Me"	5:43
4.	"Panditji"	6:18
5.	"360 Flip"	6:37
6.	"El Hombre Que Sabia" (The Man Who Knew)	5:39
7.	"Gaza City"	4:18
8.	"Kiki"	5:56
Total length:		46:57

== Personnel ==
Band

- John McLaughlin – electric and acoustic guitar, guitar programming, synthesizer
- Gary Husband – synthesizer, piano, drums, percussion
- Étienne M’Bappé – electric bass
- Ranjit Barot – drums, vocals

Production

- George Murphy – recording engineer
- Marcus Wippersberg – mixing, mastering
- Beat Pfaendler – cover design, logo
