= Electric Guitarist =

Studio album by John McLaughlin
- Released: 1978
- Recorded: January–February 1978
- Studios: Sound Mixer, New York City; Devonshire, North Hollywood, California
- Genres: Jazz, jazz-rock
- Length: 38:53
- Label: Columbia
- Producers: John McLaughlin, Dennis MacKay

John McLaughlin chronology
Natural Elements (with Shakti) (1977)	Electric Guitarist (1978)	Electric Dreams (1979)

John McLaughlin solo chronology
My Goal's Beyond (1971)	Electric Guitarist (1978)	Electric Dreams (1979)

Electric Guitarist is the fourth solo album by guitarist John McLaughlin, released in 1978 through Columbia Records originally on vinyl; a remastered CD was issued in 1990 as part of the Columbia Jazz Contemporary Masters series. Among McLaughlin’s former collaborators appearing on the album are drummers Tony Williams, Jack DeJohnette and Billy Cobham, keyboardist Chick Corea, alto saxophonist David Sanborn, violinist Jerry Goodman, bassists Jack Bruce, Stanley Clarke and Fernando Saunders and fellow guitarist Carlos Santana.

== Critical reception ==
Professional ratings
Review scores
Source	Rating
All About Jazz	(favourable)
AllMusic	4/5 stars
Christgau's Record Guide	B+
Rolling Stone	(favourable)
The Rolling Stone Jazz Record Guide	4/5 stars

The New York Times wrote that the music is "in a more conventional jazz or jazz-rock format."

== Track listing ==
All tracks are written by John McLaughlin, except where noted.

No.	Title	Length
1.	"New York on My Mind"	5:46
2.	"Friendship"	7:02
3.	"Every Tear from Every Eye"	6:53
4.	"Do You Hear the Voices That You Left Behind?"	7:41
5.	"Are You the One? Are You the One?"	4:43
6.	"Phenomenon: Compulsion"	3:23
7.	"My Foolish Heart" (Victor Young, Ned Washington)	3:25
Total length:		38:53

== Personnel ==
- John McLaughlin – guitar

"New York on My Mind"

- Jerry Goodman – violin
- Stu Goldberg – Minimoog, electric piano & organ
- Fernando Saunders – bass
- Billy Cobham – drums

"Friendship"

- Carlos Santana – guitar
- Tom Coster – organ
- Neil Jason – bass
- Narada Michael Walden – drums
- Alyrio Lima – percussion
- Armando Peraza – conga

"Every Tear from Every Eye"

- David Sanborn – alto saxophone
- Patrice Rushen – piano
- Alphonso Johnson – bass & Moog Taurus
- Tony Thunder Smith – drums

"Do You Hear the Voices That You Left Behind?"

- Chick Corea – Minimoog & electric piano
- Stanley Clarke – bass
- Jack DeJohnette – drums

"Are You the One? Are You the One?"

- Jack Bruce – bass
- Tony Williams – drums

"Phenomenon - Compulsion"

- Billy Cobham – drums

"My Foolish Heart"

- solo on electric guitar

== Charts ==
Chart (1978)	Peak position
Australian Albums (Kent Music Report)	73
New Zealand Albums (RMNZ)	38
Swedish Albums (Sverigetopplistan)	40
US Billboard 200	105
US Top Jazz Albums (Billboard)	6
