= Five Peace Band Live =

Live album by John McLaughlin & Chick Corea
- Released: April 28, 2009
- Recorded: October – November 23, 2008
- Venue: European tour
- Genre: Jazz
- Length: 139:03
- Label: Concord
- Producer: John McLaughlin, Chick Corea

John McLaughlin chronology
| Floating Point (2008) | Five Peace Band Live (2009) | To the One (2010) |

Chick Corea chronology
| Returns (2009) | Five Peace Band Live (2009) | Forever (2011) |

Professional ratings
Review scores
| Source | Rating |
|---|---|
| Allmusic | 3.5/5 stars |

Five Peace Band Live is a 2009 post bop/jazz fusion album from keyboardist Chick Corea and guitarist John McLaughlin with alto saxophonist Kenny Garrett, bassist Christian McBride and drummer Vinnie Colaiuta.

== Background ==
They toured Europe between October 22 and November 23, 2008, subsequently touring North America. They toured Asia in early 2009 with Brian Blade on drums.

== Reception ==
The album was very well received, winning the 2010 Grammy Award for Best Jazz Instrumental Album.

John Kelman in his All About Jazz review said "Running the gamut from straight-ahead to balls-out fusion, Five Peace Band Live is a rare opportunity to hear two masters create something that references both of their careers but combines to create something with its own distinct personality.".

== Track listing ==
=== Disc one ===
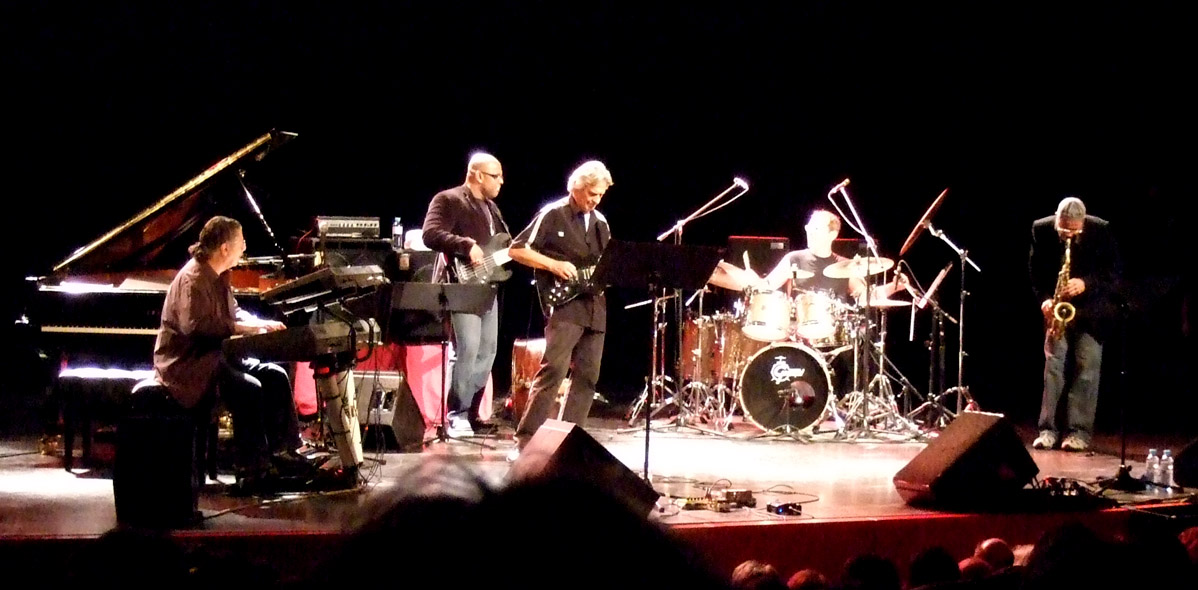
Five Peace Band live, Vienna, 2008

1. "Raju" (John McLaughlin) – 12:29
2. "The Disguise" (Chick Corea) – 13:32
3. "New Blues, Old Bruise" (John McLaughlin) – 14:06
4. "Hymn to Andromeda" (Chick Corea) – 27:45

=== Disc two ===
1. "Dr. Jackle" (Jackie McLean) – 22:53
2. "Senor C.S." (John McLaughlin) – 20:15
3. "In a Silent Way / It's About That Time" (Miles Davis, Joe Zawinul) – 20:06
4. "Someday My Prince Will Come" (Frank Churchill, Larry Morey) – 7:42

== Personnel ==
Musicians

- Chick Corea – acoustic piano, electric piano, synthesizer
- John McLaughlin – electric guitar
- Kenny Garrett – alto saxophone
- Christian McBride – acoustic bass, electric bass
- Vinnie Colaiuta – drums, percussion
- Herbie Hancock – piano (7)

Production

- Bernie Kirsh – engineering for Chick Corea
- Sven Hoffman – engineering for John McLaughlin
- Brian Vibberts – mixing
- Bernie Grundman – mastering
