= Belo Horizonte (album) =

Studio album by John McLaughlin
- Released: 1981
- Recorded: June–July 1981
- Genre: Jazz fusion, jazz
- Length: 37:34
- Label: Warner Music Group
- Producer: John McLaughlin

John McLaughlin chronology
Electric Dreams (1979)	Belo Horizonte (1981)	Friday Night in San Francisco (1981)

Professional ratings
Review scores
Source	Rating
AllMusic	3/5 stars
The Rolling Stone Jazz Record Guide	3/5 stars

Belo Horizonte is an album by English guitarist John McLaughlin, released in 1981 through Warner Music Group. The album reached number 172 on the Billboard 200 and number 11 on Billboard's Jazz Albums chart.

The album features McLaughlin on acoustic guitar, although the backing band includes electric keyboards. The same basic lineup would return on his next album Music Spoken Here. It is the first McLaughlin album including Katia Labèque, who would become his wife.

== Track listing ==
All tracks by John McLaughlin, except where noted.

1. "Belo Horizonte" – 4:28
2. "La Baleine" – 5:58
3. "Very Early (Homage to Bill Evans)" (Evans, McLaughlin) – 1:12
4. "One Melody" – 6:27
5. "Stardust on Your Sleeve" – 6:03
6. "Waltz for Katia" – 3:26
7. "Zamfir" – 5:47
8. "Manitas d'Oro (For Paco de Lucia)" – 4:13

== Personnel ==
- Tommy Campbell – drums & percussion
- Jean Paul Celea – bass guitar, acoustic bass
- François Couturier – Fender Rhodes electric piano, synthesizers
- Jean-Pierre Drouet – percussion
- Augustin Dumay – violin, vocal
- François Jeanneau – tenor & soprano saxophones
- Katia Labèque – piano, synthesizer
- Paco de Lucía – acoustic guitar
- John McLaughlin – acoustic, electric & baritone guitars
- Steve Sheman – percussion

Production:

- George Marino – mastering engineer
- Laurent Peyron – engineer
- Jean Louis Rizet – engineer

== Chart performance ==
Year	Chart	Position
1982	Billboard Jazz Albums	11
1981	Billboard 200	172
