= The Promise (John McLaughlin album) =

Studio album by John McLaughlin
- Released: 21 December 1995
- Recorded: 1995
- Genre: Jazz
- Length: 73:39
- Label: Verve
- Producer: John McLaughlin, Eddie Kramer

John McLaughlin chronology
After the Rain (1994)	The Promise (1995)	The Guitar Trio (1996)

The Promise is an album by the English musician John McLaughlin, released in 1995 on Verve Records. It peaked at number 4 in the Billboard Top Jazz Albums chart.

== Critical reception ==
Professional ratings
Review scores
Source	Rating
AllMusic	4/5 stars
The Penguin Guide to Jazz Recordings	3/4 stars

AllMusic gave it four stars and reviewer Thom Jurek stated: "Ultimately, The Promise stands as one of McLaughlin's towering achievements as a guitarist and leader." Walter Koslosky in his All About Jazz review classifies The Promise as "a potpourri of musical styles and performers. Yet, despite its disparate compositions and styles, the record manages to be a cohesive work of art. ... Bravo!" Guitar Player wrote that "The Promise is segued like a global tour through McLaughlin's musical vision, and, like its author, it is of historic proportions."

== Track listing ==
All tracks composed by John McLaughlin; except where indicated

1. "Django" (John Lewis) – 7:24
2. "Thelonius Melodius" – 5:22
3. "Amy and Joseph" – 2:28
4. "No Return" – 7:20
5. "El Ciego" – 9:10
6. "Jazz Jungle" – 14:45
7. "The Wish" – 8:39
8. "English Jam" (Vinnie Colaiuta, John McLaughlin, Sting) – 1:12
9. "Tokyo Decadence" – 0:39
10. "Shin Jin Rui" – 10:47
11. "The Peacocks" (Jimmy Rowles) – 5:53

== Personnel ==
Musicians

- Don Alias – percussion
- Jim Beard – keyboards
- Dennis Chambers – drums
- Vinnie Colaiuta – drums
- James Genus – bass guitar
- Zakir Hussain – tabla
- Nishat Khan – sitar, vocals
- Yan Maresz – arranger, acoustic bass guitar, bass guitar
- John McLaughlin – acoustic guitar, electric guitar, keyboards, MIDI guitar
- Mark Mondesir – drums
- Pino Palladino – bass
- Mariko Takahashi – vocals

Guest musicians

- Jeff Beck – electric guitar (track 1)
- Michael Brecker – tenor sax (track 6)
- Joey DeFrancesco – Hammond organ, trumpet (track 4)
- Al Di Meola – acoustic guitar (track 5)
- Trilok Gurtu – percussion (track 7)
- Tony Hymas – keyboards (track 1)
- Paco de Lucía – acoustic guitar (track 5)
- David Sanborn – alto sax (track 10)
- Sting – bass (track 8)
- Philippe Loli - acoustic guitar (track 11)

Production

- René Ameline – engineer
- Philippe Arnal – assistant engineer
- Adam Blackburn – assistant engineer
- Steve Cook – assistant engineer
- Max Costa – arranger, engineer, mixing
- Gustav Hobel – engineer
- Sven Hoffman – assistant engineer
- Ken Jones – engineer
- Eddie Kramer – engineer, producer (track 8 only)
- Alberto Mayer – cover design
- John McLaughlin – assistant engineer, mixing, producer
- Simon Osborne – assistant engineer
- Maurice Ouazana – engineer
- Christian Pégand – production coordination
- Ed Rak – engineer
- Christian Rose – photography

== Chart performance ==
Year	Chart	Position
1996	Billboard Top Jazz Albums	4
