= After the Rain (John McLaughlin album) =

Studio album by John McLaughlin
- Released: 1995
- Recorded: December 4 and 8, 1994
- Genre: Jazz fusion
- Length: 57:06
- Label: Verve
- Producer: John McLaughlin

John McLaughlin chronology
Tokyo Live (1993)	After the Rain (1995)	The Promise (1995)

Professional ratings
Review scores
Source	Rating
AllMusic	4/5 stars
The Penguin Guide to Jazz Recordings	3.5/4 stars

After the Rain is a jazz album by John McLaughlin, released in 1995 on Verve Records. The album reached number 9 in the Billboard Top Jazz Albums chart 1995. It features organist Joey DeFrancesco and veteran drummer Elvin Jones.

== Track listing ==
1. "Take the Coltrane" (Duke Ellington) – 6:01
2. "My Favorite Things" (Oscar Hammerstein II, Richard Rodgers) – 6:16
3. "Sing Me Softly of the Blues" (Carla Bley) – 6:31
4. "Encuentros" (John McLaughlin) – 7:32
5. "Naima" (John Coltrane) – 4:43
6. "Tones for Elvin Jones" (John McLaughlin) – 6:34
7. "Crescent" (John Coltrane) – 7:41
8. "Afro Blue" (Mongo Santamaría) – 6:54
9. "After the Rain" (John Coltrane) – 4:54

== Personnel ==
Musicians

- John McLaughlin – guitar
- Joey DeFrancesco – Hammond organ
- Elvin Jones – drums

Production

- Jean-Philippe Allard - executive producer
- J.L. Barilla - design
- Max Costa - mastering, mixing
- Arthur Elgort - photography
- Cheung Ching Ming – photography
- Jonathan Mooney – assistant engineer
- Ed Rak – engineer
- Michael Stein – production coordination

== Chart performance ==
Year	Chart	Position
1995	Billboard Top Jazz Albums	9
