= Thieves and Poets =

Studio album by John McLaughlin
- Released: 14 October 2003
- Recorded: June 2002
- Studio: Mediastarz Studio, Monaco
- Genre: Jazz
- Length: 44:20
- Label: Verve
- Producer: John McLaughlin

John McLaughlin chronology
Remember Shakti – Saturday Night in Bombay (2001)	Thieves and Poets (2003)	Industrial Zen (2006)

Professional ratings
Review scores
Source	Rating
Allmusic	4/5 stars
All About Jazz	
The Penguin Guide to Jazz Recordings	3/4 stars

Thieves and Poets is a studio album by John McLaughlin, released in 2003 through the record label Verve. The album reached number twenty on Billboard's Top Jazz Albums chart.

== Track listing ==
All tracks composed by John McLaughlin; except where indicated

1. "Thieves and Poets, Pt. 1" – 12:32
2. "Thieves and Poets, Pt. 2" – 8:15
3. "Thieves and Poets, Pt. 3" – 5:38
4. "My Foolish Heart" (Ned Washington, Victor Young) – 5:03
5. "The Dolphin" (Luiz Eça) – 4:16
6. "Stella by Starlight" (Washington, Young) – 4:27
7. "My Romance" (Lorenz Hart, Richard Rodgers) – 4:09

== Personnel ==
- Helmut Schartlmüller — bass
- John McLaughlin — guitar
- Matt Haimovitz — cello
- Yan Maresz — Orchestration, Sound Design
- Paul Meyer — clarinet
- Viktoria Mullova — violin

Other credits

- Guido Andreani — assistant engineer
- Pascal Bod — release coordinator
- Peppe de Angelis — assistant engineer
- Thomas Dorn — cover photo
- Lïla Guilloteau — assistant coordinator
- Ira McLaughlin — photography
- Maureen Murphy — release coordinator
- John Newcott — release coordinator
- Christian Pégand — production coordination
- Renato Rivolta — conductor
- Christoph Stickel — mastering
- Marcus Wippersberg — recording, mixing

== Chart performance ==
Year	Chart	Position
2003	Billboard Top Jazz Albums	20
