= Now Here This =

Studio album by John McLaughlin
- Released: 16 October 2012
- Genre: Jazz
- Length: 49:55
- Label: Abstract Logix
- Producer: John McLaughlin

John McLaughlin chronology
| To the One (2010) | Now Here This (2012) | Black Light (2015) |

Professional ratings
Review scores
| Source | Rating |
|---|---|
| AllMusic | 4/5 stars |
| All About Jazz | 4.5/5 stars |
| Guardian | 3/5 stars |
| DownBeat | 4.5/5 stars |

Now Here This is an album by John McLaughlin and The 4th Dimension, released in 2012 through the record label Abstract Logix. The album reached number 25 on Billboard's Jazz Albums charts.

== Track listing ==
All tracks written by John McLaughlin.

1. "Trancefusion" – 7:16
2. "Riff Raff" – 7:02
3. "Echoes from Then" – 6:07
4. "Wonderfall" – 6:27
5. "Call and Answer" – 5:53
6. "Not Here Not There" – 6:16
7. "Guitar Love" – 7:08
8. "Take It or Leave It" – 3:46

== Personnel ==
- Ranjit Barot – drums
- Gary Husband – drums, piano, synthesizer
- Étienne M'Bappé – electric bass, fretless bass
- John McLaughlin – electric guitar, synthesizer guitar

Other credits

- Frédéric Betin – engineer
- Marcus Wippersberg – engineer, mastering, mixing
