= Music Spoken Here =

Studio album by John McLaughlin
- Released: 1982
- Recorded: June–July 1982
- Studio: Ramses Studios, Paris
- Genre: Jazz fusion, jazz
- Length: 38:31
- Label: Warner Music Group
- Producer: John McLaughlin

John McLaughlin chronology
Belo Horizonte (1981)	Music Spoken Here (1982)	Passion, Grace and Fire (1983)

Professional ratings
Review scores
Source	Rating
All About Jazz	(positive)
AllMusic	3/5 stars
The Rolling Stone Jazz Record Guide	3/5 stars

Music Spoken Here is an album by John McLaughlin, released in 1982 through Warner Music Group. The album reached number 24 in the Billboard Jazz Albums chart 1983.

== Track listing ==
1. "Aspan" (John McLaughlin) – 5:42
2. "Blues for L.W." (McLaughlin) – 6:21
3. "The Translators" (McLaughlin) – 2:38
4. "Honky-Tonk Haven" (McLaughlin, Shankar) – 4:08
5. "Viene Clareando" (Segundo Aredes, Atahualpa Yupanqui) – 0:32
6. "David" (McLaughlin) – 7:47
7. "Negative Ions" (McLaughlin) – 3:52
8. "Brise De Coeur" (McLaughlin) – 5:20
9. "Loro" (Egberto Gismonti) – 2:11

== Personnel ==
- John McLaughlin – guitar
- Katia Labèque – keyboards
- François Couturier – keyboards
- Jean Paul Celea – bass
- Tommy Campbell – drums

Production

- Jean Luis Rizeri – chief engineer
- Laurent Peyron – assistant engineer
- Dominique Isserman – group photo
- Hipgnosis/STD/APP/Assorted iMaGes – sleeve

== Chart performance ==
Year	Chart	Position
1983	Billboard Jazz Albums	24
