= Electric Dreams (John McLaughlin album) =

Studio album by John McLaughlin
- Released: 1979
- Recorded: November–December 1978
- Studio: Sound Mixer Studios, New York City
- Genre: Jazz fusion
- Length: 38:40
- Label: Columbia
- Producer: John McLaughlin

John McLaughlin chronology
Electric Guitarist (1978)	Electric Dreams (1979)	Belo Horizonte (1981)

Electric Dreams is the fifth solo album by English jazz guitarist John McLaughlin and his "One Truth Band" (featuring violinist L. Shankar, keyboardist Stu Goldberg, bassist Fernando Saunders, percussionist Alyrio Lima and drummer Tony "Thunder" Smith), released in 1979. Between his third and fourth solo albums he spent several years leading the Mahavishnu Orchestra (which featured Goldberg), and Shakti (which featured Shankar).

While performing with Miles Davis, Davis had titled a song on the album Bitches Brew "John McLaughlin". McLaughlin returns the favour here, naming a song "Miles Davis".

== Critical reception ==
Professional ratings
Review scores
Source	Rating
AllMusic	3.5/5 stars
Christgau's Record Guide	B−
The Penguin Guide to Jazz Recordings	3/4 stars
The Rolling Stone Jazz Record Guide	2/5 stars

All About Jazz wrote that "Electric Dreams offers some of the best composing and playing of McLaughlin's career and has been unfairly overlooked."

== Track listing ==
All songs by John McLaughlin unless otherwise noted.

1. "Guardian Angels" – 0:51
2. "Miles Davis" – 4:54
3. "Electric Dreams, Electric Sighs" – 6:57
4. "Desire and the Comforter" – 7:34
5. "Love and Understanding" – 6:36
6. "Singing Earth" (Stu Goldberg) – 0:37
7. "The Dark Prince" – 5:15
8. "The Unknown Dissident" – 6:16

== Personnel ==
- John McLaughlin – 6, 12 & 13-string acoustic & electric guitars, banjo
- L. Shankar – acoustic & electric violin
- Stu Goldberg – electric piano/ pedals, Moog synthesizer (with Steiner-Parker modifications), Prophet synthesizer, Hammond B-3 organ
- Fernando Saunders – bass guitar, acoustic bass, vocal ("Love & Understanding")
- Tony "Thunder" Smith – drums, backing vocal ("Love & Understanding)
- Alyrio Lima – percussions
- David Sanborn – alto saxophone ("The Unknown Dissident")

== Charts ==
Chart (1979)	Peak position
Australian Albums (Kent Music Report)	75
New Zealand Albums (RMNZ)	27
US Billboard 200	147
US Top Jazz Albums (Billboard)	14
