= Liberation Time =

Studio album by John McLaughlin
- Released: 16 July 2021
- Studio: Monaco, Paris, London, Cairo, Los Angeles
- Genre: Jazz
- Length: 36:55
- Label: Abstract Logix ABL 65
- Producer: John McLaughlin

John McLaughlin chronology
| Black Light (2015) | Liberation Time (2021) |

Professional ratings
Aggregate scores
| Source | Rating |
|---|---|
| Metacritic | 80/100 |
Review scores
| Source | Rating |
| All About Jazz | 3.5/5 stars |
| AllMusic | 4/5 stars |
| Classic Rock | 4/5 stars |
| DownBeat | 3/5 stars |
| Jazz Journal | 4/5 stars |
| Jazzwise | 4/5 stars |
| Mojo | 4/5 stars |
| The Wire | 3.5/5 stars |
| Tom Hull | B+ |

Liberation Time is a studio album by British jazz guitarist John McLaughlin. The album was recorded in various locations and released on 16 July 2021 via Abstract Logix. The album's personnel includes members of McLaughlin's current ensemble 4th Dimension: Gary Husband on drums and piano, Etienne Mbappé on bass guitar, Ranjit Barot on drums and Konokol vocals—in addition to invited guests.

== Reception ==
Michael Ullman of The Arts Fuse stated, "The disc is his defiant, even occasionally joyous, response to the Covid lockdown. In his notes, the guitarist is determined to be positive." Elliot Marlow-Stevens of Jazz Journal wrote, "Drawn from inspiration found during the isolation of the coronavirus pandemic, McLaughlin’s latest album demonstrates his enduring skill as one of fusion’s most important figures." James Hale of DownBeat commented, "A sub-40-minute John McLaughlin recording that includes two solo piano tracks by the leader is bound to be frustrating. Add a pair of band recordings that echo vintage Mahavishnu Orchestra rave-ups, one of which includes a guitar solo filled with ridiculous technique, and you have a recipe for considering what might have been."

== Track listing ==
| No. | Title | Writer(s) | Length |
|---|---|---|---|
| 1. | "As the Spirit Sings" | Sam Burgess, Vinnie Colaiuta, Gary Husband, John McLaughlin | 5:22 |
| 2. | "Singing our Secrets" | Jean Michel Aublette, John McLaughlin, Roger Rossignol | 5:13 |
| 3. | "Lockdown Blues" | Ranjit Barot, Gary Husband, Etienne Mbappé, John McLaughlin | 7:19 |
| 4. | "Mila Repa" | John McLaughlin | 2:29 |
| 5. | "Right Here, Right Now, Right On" | Osam Ezzeldin, John McLaughlin, Jérôme Regard, Julian Siegal, Nicolas Viccaro | 7:26 |
| 6. | "Shade of Blue" | John McLaughlin | 1:33 |
| 7. | "Liberation Time" | Sam Burgess, Gary Husband, John McLaughlin | 7:49 |
| Total length: | | | 36:55 |

== Personnel ==
- John McLaughlin – guitar (tracks 1–3, 5, 7), piano (tracks 4, 6)
- Julian Siegel – tenor saxophone (track 5)
- Gary Husband – keyboards (tracks 1, 3), drums (track 7)
- Oz Ezzeldin – piano (track 5)
- Roger Rossignol – piano (track 2)
- Sam Burgess – bass (tracks 1, 7)
- Etienne Mbappe – bass (track 3)
- Jérôme Regard – bass (track 5)
- Vinnie Colaiuta – drums (track 1)
- Jean-Michel Aublette – drums (track 2), bass (track 2)
- Ranjit Barot – drums (track 3), Konokol vocals (track 3)
- Nicolas Viccaro – drums (track 5)
