= To the One =

2010 studio album by John McLaughlin

Studio album by John McLaughlin
- Released: 20 April 2010
- Recorded: November – December 2009
- Studio: Mediastarz, Monaco; Solid Sound Studio, Nice
- Genre: Jazz
- Length: 40:01
- Label: Abstract Logix
- Producer: John McLaughlin

John McLaughlin chronology
Five Peace Band Live (2009)	To the One (2010)	Now Here This (2012)

To the One is an album released by British jazz guitarist John McLaughlin. It is his first album with his band, the 4th Dimension. The album was released in 2010 on Abstract Logix Records and was produced by McLaughlin. It reached number 27 on the Billboard Jazz Albums Chart and was nominated for the 2011 Grammy Award for Best Contemporary Jazz Album.

== Overview ==
I had no intention or idea or desire to make an homage, but the music came like that and reminded me of the marvelous event when I heard Love Supreme for the first time. It changed my life.

— John McLaughlin

To the One was inspired by the 1965 John Coltrane album A Love Supreme. The liner notes were written by McLaughlin and detail how he was influenced by A Love Supreme both musically and spiritually.

The music came to McLaughlin over a five-week period in the summer of 2009. McLaughlin previously honoured the memory of Coltrane on his 1973 collaboration with Carlos Santana, Love Devotion Surrender.

The album was nominated for the 2011 Grammy Award for Best Contemporary Jazz Album but lost to the Stanley Clarke album The Stanley Clarke Band. The other nominees were Never Can Say Goodbye by Joey DeFrancesco, Now Is the Time by Jeff Lorber, and Backatown by Trombone Shorty.

== The band ==
McLaughlin has been playing with this group of musicians live since 2007 but this is their first release of new material. In addition to his keyboard playing throughout the album, Gary Husband also plays drums on two tracks, "Recovery" and "To the One". He also has a piano solo on the track "Special Beings". Bassist Etienne Mbappé, who was born Cameroon and raised in Paris, replaced original 4th Dimension Bassist Hadrien Feraud when he broke his hand in 2009, has a solo on the track "Discovery". Mark Mondesir plays drums on every track except "Recovery" and "To the One". Bandleader and composer John McLaughlin provides all of the guitar work and plays a guitar synth on "Lost and Found" and "To the One".

== Reception ==
Professional ratings
To the One
Review scores
Source	Rating
AllMusic	4/5 stars
The Guardian	4/5 stars
The Times	3/5 stars
The Aquarian Weekly	(B+)
Jazzwise	4/5 stars
All About Jazz	(favorable)
Tom Hull	B+

Mike Greenblatt called To the One "very heady, complicated, meandering, spiritual, bass-centric yet trebly and deeply satisfying" in The Aquarian Weekly. Thom Jurek of AllMusic called the album an "inspired milestone for McLaughlin and a fine recorded introduction to one of the more exciting electric jazz groups in the 4th Dimension". Stuart Nicholson of Jazzwise referred to the album as "an odyssey through McLaughlin's spiritual awakening and the meaning it has had in his music". John Fordham of The Guardian wrote that the album is a "tight 40-minute document [that] hums with a collaborative energy".

John Bungey of The Times was more mixed in his review writing "a strong group performance but a few more memorable themes amid the bustle might have added to the spiritual uplift". Randy Ray wrote on Jambands.com that McLaughlin "finds a way to pull his listeners under the surface, and into that fourth dimensional point of view".

John Kelman in All About Jazz wrote that there is "no shortage of high octane playing here" and that it is "McLaughlin's most exhilarating work and group since his Heart of Things band in the late 1990s" and closed by saying that the album is "quite simply, McLaughlin's best album in well over a decade". Ian Patterson in All About Jazz wrote that "Simply listening to his improvisations throughout the six originals leaves no doubt that he is in inspired creative form." Robert Bush, also in All About Jazz, called To the One the "most consistently engaging disc in years" and that "McLaughlin's chops have never been better".

== Track listing ==
All tracks written by John McLaughlin

1. "Discovery" 6:19
2. "Special Beings" 8:38
3. "The Fine Line" 7:43
4. "Lost and Found" 4:26
5. "Recovery" 6:21
6. "To the One" 6:34

== Personnel ==
- John McLaughlin – guitar, producer
- Gary Husband – drums, keyboards, percussion
- Etienne Mbappé – bass
- Mark Mondesir – drums, percussion
- Marcus Wippersberg – engineer, mixing
- Beat Pfaendler – cover design, cover photo

== Charts ==
Year	Chart	Peak position
2010	Billboard Jazz Albums	27
