= Time Remembered: John McLaughlin Plays Bill Evans =

Studio album by John McLaughlin
- Released: 9 November 1993
- Genre: Jazz
- Length: 40:06
- Label: Verve
- Producer: John McLaughlin; Jean-Philippe Allard (executive)

John McLaughlin chronology
Qué Alegría (1992)	Time Remembered: John McLaughlin Plays Bill Evans (1993)	Tokyo Live (1994)

Professional ratings
Review scores
Source	Rating
Allmusic	2/5 stars
All About Jazz	(favorable)
The Penguin Guide to Jazz Recordings	2.5/4 stars

Time Remembered: John McLaughlin Plays Bill Evans is an album by John McLaughlin. It was recorded in March 1993 and released on the Verve label in 1993. The album reached number 10 in the Billboard Top Jazz Albums chart.

== Reception ==
AllMusic awarded the album only 2 stars, and the review by Scott Yanow states that "more mood and tempo variations would have kept this from being such a sleepy and overly respectful session." By contrast, Walter Kolosky in his All About Jazz review is far more positive, stating, "Time Remembered is a beautiful and fully realized tribute. The sound is full and rich, and the playing is strong and forthright all around. McLaughlin’s soloing is fluid, occasionally too dense, but never misdirected."

== Track listing ==
All tracks composed by Bill Evans; except where indicated

1. "Prologue" – 2:14
2. "Very Early (Homage to Bill Evans)" (Bill Evans, John McLaughlin) – 4:20
3. "Only Child" – 5:06
4. "Waltz for Debby" (Bill Evans, Gene Lees) – 4:55
5. "Homage" (John McLaughlin) – 2:16
6. "My Bells" – 3:22
7. "Time Remembered" – 3:59
8. "Song for Helen" – 1:54
9. "Turn Out the Stars" – 6:26
10. "We Will Meet Again" – 4:20
11. "Epilogue" – 1:14

== Personnel ==
- Alexandre Delfa – acoustic guitar
- Yan Maresz – acoustic bass
- John McLaughlin – acoustic guitar
- Pascal Rabatti – acoustic guitar
- François Szonyi – acoustic guitar

Other credits

- Jean-Philippe Allard – executive producer
- Paolo Bocchi – assistant engineer
- Dario Bontempi – engineer
- Max Costa – engineer
- Charles French – photography
- Jean-Pierre Larcher – photography
- John McLaughlin – liner notes, mixing supervision, producer

== Charts ==
Chart (1992)	Peak position
US Top Jazz Albums (Billboard)	10
