= Industrial Zen =

Studio album by John McLaughlin
- Released: 22 May 2006
- Studio: Various: Metropolis Studios (London); The Cutting Room Studios (New York City); Under the Bed Studios (New York City); Winsome Farm Studio (North Salem); Tony Grey Studio (Brooklyn); Otmatik Sound (Santa Clarita); At Beatnik Studio (Sherman Oaks); Saucer Sound Studio (Austin); Mediastarz Studio (Monaco)
- Genre: Jazz fusion; electric jazz
- Length: 61:26
- Label: Verve
- Producer: John McLaughlin

John McLaughlin chronology
Thieves and Poets (2003)	Industrial Zen (2006)	Floating Point (2008)

Industrial Zen is a studio album recorded by English jazz musician John McLaughlin in 2006. It was released on 22 May 2006 by Verve Records as a compact disc. Following the release of Thieves and Poets (2003), he began creating an album that was more ambitious and one that he could consider unique to him. He collaborated with various musicians for the project, such as vocalist Shankar Mahadevan, saxophonist Bill Evans, and tabla player Zakir Hussain. A jazz fusion and electric jazz album, Industrial Zen features the use of several instruments, including drums, keyboards, the electric bass, and the tabla. Additionally, McLaughlin wrote and produced all eight songs that appear on the record.

The album was generally well received by music critics for being musically diverse. One critic also pointed out that it resembled some of McLaughlin's work that he released in the 1970s. Commercially, the album fared well on two jazz music Billboard charts, peaking at numbers 9 and 14 on the Top Jazz Albums and Jazz Albums charts, respectively.

== Development and recording ==
After completing Thieves and Poets in 2003, McLaughlin began work on Industrial Zen, which was considered a much "more aggressive and sonically ambitious" album than the former. He wanted to make a record that would be considered "ground breaking" in terms of how many musical genres it involved. While speaking during the creation of Industrial Zen with music critic Bill Milkowski, he stated:

"I think the critics will crucify me which is what I'm looking forward to. I'm going to destroy everything. I want to do something underground, unconventional. I'd like to get Eric Johnson involved in this project. They're guys that I’ve known for years, and great guitar players, but I'd like to put them in another environment, in a situation that they've never been in before. And I'd like to get some sax players—jazz players and other kinds. And I'll definitely use Shankar Mahadevan, the amazing vocalist who appears on Remember Shakti's Saturday Night in Bombay. I’ve been thinking about this underground thing for three years but I just haven't had time to do it. I'm dying to get it out. It's like giving birth."

McLaughlin traveled to various destinations in order to record Industrial Zen; in New York City, he recorded at The Cutting Room Studios, Under the Bed Studios, Tony Grey Studio, and Winsome Farm Studio. He also had sessions at Metropolis Studios in London, Mediastarz Studio in Monaco, Saucer Sound Studio in Austin Texas, and Otmatic Sound and At Beatnik Studio in California. It was released on 22 May 2006 by Verve Records exclusively as a compact disc.

== Music and sound ==
Musically, Industrial Zen is a jazz fusion and electric jazz album, similar to McLaughlin's previously released material. A few of the songs included serve as tributes to different musicians; additionally, all of the tracks to appear on the album were written and produced by McLaughlin, with the exception of "Mother Nature", which features additional songwriting from Mahadevan and Antonia Minnecola. He opens the album with "For Jaco", an upbeat track that combines the use of drums and saxophones; "newcomer" drummers Gary Husband and Mark Mondesir performed on the song, which features an electric bass and was described as "energetic" by one reviewer. Track two, "New Blues Old Bruise", features "sampled chorus effects" on its vocals created and a "moody" production that was compared to the works of English rock band Pink Floyd. "Wayne's Way" follows and serves as a tribute to performer Wayne Shorter; the track is an example of McLaughlin's influence from modern jazz on the album. On the fourth track, "Just So Only More So", McLaughlin and the saxophonist Bill Evans play together. As the song begins to wrap up, they perform a "touching, conversational dialogue on their instruments".

"To Bop or Not to Be" is a track dedicated to jazz musician Michael Brecker. Featuring a tabla, drums, bass, and keyboards, the track features an Indian-influenced melody surrounded by "hypnotic synthesizer[s]". "Dear Dalai Lama" references the Dalai Lama and features guest vocals from Mahadevan amidst a "spiritual ambience". A passionate song with "shifting moods", tabla player Zakir Hussain appears alongside Ada Rovatti who plays the saxophone. "Senor C.S." is track seven and another tribute song, this time to Carlos Santana. An "energetic" track, it features contributions from bassist Hadrien Feraud. The album closes with "Mother Nature", a song with Mahadevan's "keening vocals" and an "electronic revolving ostinato".

== Reception ==
Professional ratings
Review scores
Source	Rating
All About Jazz	4.5/5 stars
AllMusic	3/5 stars
The Penguin Guide to Jazz Recordings	3/4 stars
Tom Hull	B+

Industrial Zen has received generally favorable reviews from music critics. John Kelman from All About Jazz called the album a "perfect confluence of [McLaughlin's] divergent interests". He also thought that the album was proof that despite the criticism for McLaughlin's "occasionally unsuccessful aspirations", he is able to "show that his eyes and ears remain fully open". Stuart Nicholson from Jazzwise was highly favorable of Industrial Zen; calling it "one of his most exciting and dangerous albums in a long while", Nicholson noted that McLaughlin's ability to "bring [...] a variety of influences" into his music allowed him to create a comprehensive album. A writer from Billboard noted that McLaughlin was "vibrant[ly] reinventing" his career with Industrial Zen; the same critic also noted that the record has "clarity, focus and surprise". In a more mixed opinion, AllMusic's Richard S. Ginell awarded the album three out of five stars. He praised "Mother Nature" as a standout on the album but found it to be "the only track that really sticks in the memory". David R. Adler, writing for JazzTimes, found McLaughlin to be "in good form" on Industrial Zen.

Commercially, the album entered two jazz music Billboard charts in 2006. On the Jazz Albums chart, it peaked at number 14, becoming McLaughlin's highest-charting album as an artist (which would later tie with his 2015 album Black Light). It also appeared on the Top Jazz Albums chart, where it peaked at number 9.

== Track listing ==
All tracks produced by McLaughlin and information derived from the album's official liner notes.

No.	Title	Writer(s)	Length
1.	"For Jaco"	John McLaughlin	5:15
2.	"New Blues Old Bruise"	McLaughlin	7:14
3.	"Wayne's Way"	McLaughlin	7:06
4.	"Just So Only More So"	McLaughlin	9:56
5.	"To Bop or Not to Be"	McLaughlin	6:41
6.	"Dear Dalai Lama"	McLaughlin	12:28
7.	"Senor C.S."	McLaughlin	7:38
8.	"Mother Nature"	McLaughlin; Shankar Mahadevan; Antonia Minnecola	5:08
Total length:			61:26

== Personnel ==
=== Musicians ===
- Dennis Chambers – drum set
- Vinnie Colaiuta – drum set
- Mark Mondesir – drum set
- Marcus Wippersberg – drum set
- Hadrien Feraud – bass guitar
- Matthew Garrison – bass guitar
- Tony Grey – bass guitar
- Gary Husband – drum set, keyboards
- Zakir Hussain – tabla
- Eric Johnson – guitar
- Shankar Mahadevan – composer, vocals
- John McLaughlin – chant, composer, drum programming, guitar, synthesizer programming
- Bill Evans – saxophone
- Ada Rovatti – saxophone
- Otmaro Ruíz – synthesizer, synthesizer programming

=== Production ===
- Michel Bocande – photography
- David Channing – engineer
- Max Crace – photography
- Matthew Garrison – engineer
- Jesus Martinez – photography
- John McLaughlin – producer
- Karen Miller – photography
- Richard Mullen – engineer
- Naoju Nakamura – photography
- Otmaro Ruíz – engineer
- Christoph Stickel – mastering
- Neil Tucker – engineer

== Charts ==
Chart (2006)	Peak position
US Jazz Albums (Billboard)	14
US Top Jazz Albums (Billboard)	9
