= The Heart of Things =

Studio album by John McLaughlin
- Released: 1997
- Recorded: 1997
- Genre: Jazz fusion
- Length: 47:22
- Label: Verve
- Producer: John McLaughlin

John McLaughlin chronology
The Guitar Trio (1996)	The Heart of Things (1997)	Remember Shakti – The Believer (2000)

Professional ratings
Review scores
Source	Rating
Allmusic	4/5 stars
All About Jazz	
The Penguin Guide to Jazz Recordings	3.5/4 stars

The Heart of Things is an electric jazz fusion album released by guitarist John McLaughlin on Verve in 1997. Musicians include saxophonist Gary Thomas, keyboardist Jim Beard, bassist Matthew Garrison and drummer Dennis Chambers. All compositions were by McLaughlin, who also produced the album.

The album was recorded & mixed at the Officine Mechaniche studio in Milan, Italy, with engineers Paolo Iafelice and Celeste Frigo. Mixing engineers were Max Costa and Frigo.

== Track listing ==
All tracks composed by John McLaughlin

1. "Acid Jazz" (8:19)
2. "Seven Sisters" (10:17)
3. "Mr. D.C." (7:07)
4. "Fallen Angels" (9:29)
5. "Healing Hands" (7:36)
6. "When Love is Far Away" (4:34)

== Personnel ==
- John McLaughlin - electric, acoustic and MIDI guitars
- Gary Thomas - tenor and soprano saxophones, flute
- Jim Beard - synthesizers, acoustic piano
- Matthew Garrison - bass guitar, fretless bass guitar
- Jean-Paul Celea - double bass on "Acid Jazz"
- Dennis Chambers - drums
- Victor Williams - percussion

== Chart performance ==
Year	Chart	Position
1997	Billboard Top Jazz Albums	4
