= Devotion (John McLaughlin album) =

Studio album by John McLaughlin
- Released: July 1970
- Recorded: February 1970
- Studio: Record Plant Studios, New York City
- Genre: Acid rock; psychedelic rock; instrumental rock
- Length: 35:28
- Label: Douglas
- Producer: Alan Douglas and Stefan Bright

John McLaughlin chronology
Extrapolation (1969)	Devotion (1970)	Where Fortune Smiles (1971)

Devotion is the second album by the English jazz fusion guitarist John McLaughlin, released in 1970. It was recorded while McLaughlin was a member of the Tony Williams Lifetime, and features his Lifetime bandmate Larry Young (organ) alongside Jimi Hendrix's Band of Gypsys drummer Buddy Miles and Taj Mahal bassist Billy Rich. McLaughlin was unhappy with the final production job by Alan Douglas.

== Recording ==
According to The Rolling Stone Jazz Record Guide, the album is "as close" as McLaughlin ever came to "straight rock playing." On his website, McLaughlin wrote, “In 1969, I signed a contract in America for two records. First is 'Devotion' that is destroyed by producer Alan Douglas who mixes the recording in my absence.”

== Critical reception ==
Professional ratings
Review scores
Source	Rating
AllMusic	4.5/5 stars
Christgau's Record Guide	A
The Rolling Stone Jazz Record Guide	3/5 stars
The Village Voice	A−
The Penguin Guide to Jazz Recordings	3/4 stars

In a contemporary review, Rolling Stone magazine called the album "very fine" and said that McLaughlin "has managed to make an album as Heavy as the most fanatical Led Zeppelin devotee could wish, while maintaining a high musical level". Sean Westergaard of AllMusic called it "arguably one of the finest acid rock albums of all time," and concluded, "Devotion is a complete anomaly in his catalog, as well as one of his finest achievements."

== Track listing ==
All songs written by John McLaughlin.

Side one

1. "Devotion" – 11:25
2. "Dragon Song" – 4:13

Side two

1. "Marbles" – 4:05
2. "Siren" – 5:55
3. "Don't Let the Dragon Eat Your Mother" – 5:18
4. "Purpose of When" – 4:45

== Personnel ==
- John McLaughlin – electric guitar
- Larry Young – organ, electric piano
- Billy Rich – bass guitar
- Buddy Miles – drums, percussion

== Charts ==
Chart (1970)	Peak position
Canada Top Albums/CDs (RPM)	62
