= Extrapolation (album) =

Studio album by John McLaughlin
- Released: 1969
- Recorded: 18 January 1969
- Studios: Advision Studios, London
- Genre: Jazz
- Length: 40:42
- Labels: Marmalade, Polydor
- Producer: Giorgio Gomelsky

John McLaughlin chronology
Extrapolation (1969)	Devotion (1970)

Professional ratings
Review scores
Source	Rating
AllMusic	4.5/5 stars
All About Jazz	(favorable)
Penguin Guide to Jazz	(Crown award)
The Rolling Stone Jazz Record Guide	3/5 stars

Extrapolation is the debut album by English jazz guitarist John McLaughlin. It was recorded at Advision Studios in January 1969 and first released later in the year by Marmalade Records in the UK. The label was founded by producer Giorgio Gomelsky and distributed by Polydor Records. Re-issues of the album are on the Polydor label.

In 1972, the album was issued for the first time in the United States following McLaughlin's success as the leader of Mahavishnu Orchestra. It reached No. 152 on the Billboard 200 album chart.

"Binky's Beam" is dedicated to former jazz bass player Binky McKenzie.

== Track listing ==
All tracks are written by John McLaughlin.

No.	Title	Length
1.	"Extrapolation"	2:57
2.	"It's Funny"	4:25
3.	"Arjen's Bag"	4:25
4.	"Pete the Poet"	5:00
5.	"This Is for Us to Share"	3:30
6.	"Spectrum"	2:45
7.	"Binky's Beam" (sometimes mistakenly printed as "Binky's Dream")	7:05
8.	"Really You Know"	4:25
9.	"Two for Two"	3:35
10.	"Peace Piece"	1:50
Total length:		40:42

== Personnel ==
Musicians:

- John McLaughlin – electric and acoustic guitar
- John Surman – baritone and soprano saxophones
- Brian Odgers – double bass (incorrectly named "Odges" on the liner notes)
- Tony Oxley – drums

Technical:

- Giorgio Gomelsky – producer
- Eddy Offord – engineer (listed as "Eddie Offord")

== Charts ==
Chart (1972)	Peak position
US Billboard 200	152
