= Abraham Wechter =

American luthier

Abraham Wechter is an American luthier who has been making custom guitars since the 1970s. He is known for building 6- and 12-string acoustic guitars and acoustic bass guitars. He was a student of luthier Richard Schneider, and for ten years he worked for the guitar company Gibson. After leaving Gibson, he started Wechter Guitars in Paw Paw, Michigan. In 2008 he moved his shop to Fort Wayne, Indiana.

Wechter builds many guitars with his Pathmaker design, an acoustic guitar with a double cutaway. Some of his guitars have drone strings and scalloped fingerboards. In 1976, he collaborated with jazz guitarist John McLaughlin to create the Shakti guitar, which was used by McLaughlin in his band Shakti. The Shakti guitar is a customized Gibson J-200 with drone strings transversely across the soundhole. He also made him a guitar with scalloped fingerboards.

In 2013, Wechter Guitars closed and, according to his web site, Abraham Wechter moved his shop to Guangzhou, China, where he continues to build handmade custom guitars.

Wechter has built guitars for John Denver, Al Di Meola, Jonas Hellborg, Steve Howe, Earl Klugh, Johnny Hiland, and Roman Miroshnichenko.
