= John McLaughlin (musician) =

English jazz fusion guitarist (born 1942)

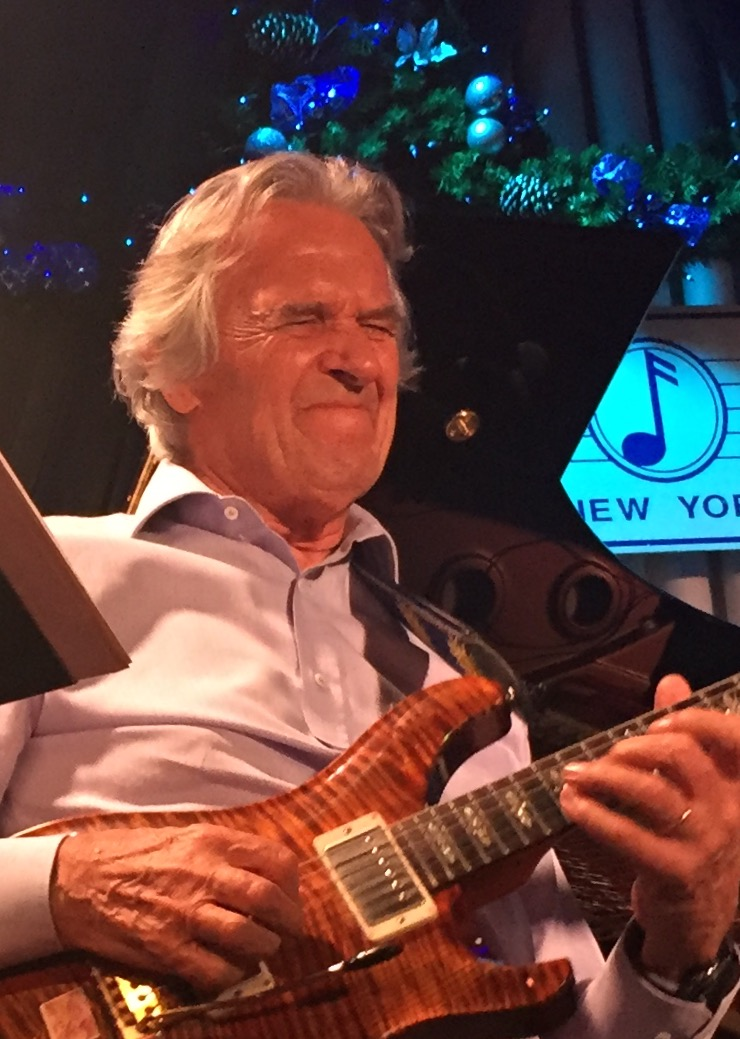
- John McLaughlin performing on Chick Corea's 75th birthday at the Blue Note Jazz Club in New York City on 10 December 2016

Background information
- Born: 4 January 1942 (age 84); Doncaster, West Riding of Yorkshire, England
- Genres: Jazz fusion; world fusion; progressive rock; psychedelic rock
- Occupations: Musician; songwriter
- Instruments: Guitar; piano
- Years active: 1963–present
- Labels: Douglas; Columbia; Verve; Warner Bros.; Abstract Logix
- Website: www.johnmclaughlin.com

John McLaughlin (born 4 January 1942), also previously known as Mahavishnu, is an English guitarist, bandleader, and composer. A pioneer of jazz fusion, his music combines elements of jazz with rock, world music, Western classical music, flamenco, and blues. After contributing to several key British groups of the early 1960s, McLaughlin made Extrapolation, his first album as a bandleader, in 1969. He then moved to the U.S., where he played with drummer Tony Williams' group Lifetime and then with Miles Davis on his 1969–72 electric jazz fusion albums In a Silent Way, Bitches Brew, Jack Johnson, Live-Evil, and On the Corner. His 1970s electric band, the Mahavishnu Orchestra, performed a technically virtuosic and complex style of music that fused electric jazz and rock with Classical, Indian and other influences. In 1974, he helped found Shakti, a seminal Indian-Jazz rock fusion band with Indian violinist L. Shankar and percussionists Zakir Hussain and Vikku Vinayakram.

McLaughlin's solo on "Miles Beyond" from his album Live at Ronnie Scott's won the 2018 Grammy Award for the Best Improvised Jazz Solo. He has been awarded multiple "Guitarist of the Year" and "Best Jazz Guitarist" awards from magazines such as DownBeat and Guitar Player based on reader polls. In 2003, he was ranked 49th in Rolling Stone magazine's list of the "100 Greatest Guitarists of All Time". In 2009, DownBeat included McLaughlin in its unranked list of "75 Great Guitarists", in the "Modern Jazz Maestros" category. In 2012, Guitar World magazine ranked him 63rd on its top 100 list. In 2010, Jeff Beck called McLaughlin "the best guitarist alive", and Pat Metheny has also described him as the world's greatest guitarist. In 2017, McLaughlin was awarded an honorary doctorate of music from Berklee College of Music.

== Biography ==
=== 1960s ===
John McLaughlin was born on 4 January 1942 to a family of musicians in Doncaster, South Yorkshire, England. His mother Mary was a concert violinist; his father John, of Irish descent, was an engineer. The younger John McLaughlin was predominantly raised by his mother and grandmother; his father, the elder John, had separated from Mary when he was 7 years old. The younger John did not have a relationship with his father for most of his life, until in the late 1970s when he contacted his father and took him out to a pub. The younger John said of the experience, "Without my dad, I wouldn't be here. At least I had closure, and for that I thank my lucky stars"; His father later died from a heart attack. Also, at the age of 7, the younger John McLaughlin heard classical music on the phonograph, and considered it a "message to my heart and soul more than anything"; this motivated him to become a musician.

McLaughlin studied violin and piano as a child; At the age of 11, his brother gave John a guitar and John immediately took up the instrument, exploring styles from flamenco to the jazz of Tal Farlow, Django Reinhardt and Stéphane Grappelli. Other influences included Muddy Waters, Sabicas, Jim Hall, Miles Davis, John Coltrane, Bill Evans, Thelonius Monk, S. Balachander, and Jimi Hendrix. He moved to London from Yorkshire in the early 1960s, playing with Alexis Korner and the Marzipan Twisters before moving on to Georgie Fame and the Blue Flames, the Graham Bond Quartet (in 1963) and Brian Auger. During the 1960s, he often supported himself with session work, which he frequently found unsatisfying but which enhanced his playing and sight-reading. Also, he gave guitar lessons to Jimmy Page. In 1963, Jack Bruce formed the Graham Bond Quartet with Bond, Ginger Baker and John McLaughlin. They played an eclectic range of music genres, including bebop, blues and rhythm.

Graham Bond was McLaughlin's first spiritual influence. Bond would introduce McLaughlin to Indian culture, philosophy, and religious esoteric practices, which McLaughlin stated "triggered a desire to know", while under the influence of drugs. The Graham Bond Quartet was not well received financially and critically; McLaughlin quit the group.

By 1966, while working in pop and jazz sessions, McLaughlin observed the personal tragedies of those of his musical peers who succumbed to drug addictions and death. As a response, McLaughlin would gradually stop using drugs and pursue a spiritual lifestyle, which would be a recurring motif of his music career. At the same time, McLaughlin experienced a profound musical revelation when psychedelic music was in vogue: he inferred that this music raised existential questions and insisted that he was "on the same boat" as those who sought answers to such questions, which further motivated his interests in Indian culture and its classical music. For a time, in 1968, McLaughlin would be involved in the free jazz scene with musician Gunter Hampel; McLaughlin described this experience as "devastating" and "anarchistic", but appreciated the free-form aspect of the genre. McLaughlin would later state in a July 2024 interview for JazzTimes that his experience with Hampel was "self-indulgent" and that he needed "structure ... the more restraints I put on myself, the happier I felt."

In January 1969, McLaughlin recorded his debut album Extrapolation in London. It prominently features John Surman on saxophone and Tony Oxley on drums. McLaughlin composed the number "Binky's Beam" as a tribute to his friend, the innovative bass player Binky McKenzie. The album's post-bop style is quite different from McLaughlin's later fusion works, though it gradually developed a strong reputation among critics by the mid-1970s.

McLaughlin moved to the U.S. in 1969 to join Tony Williams' group Lifetime. A recording from the Record Plant, NYC, dated 25 March 1969, exists of McLaughlin jamming with Jimi Hendrix. McLaughlin recollects "we played one night, just a jam session. And we played from 2 until 8, in the morning. I thought it was a wonderful experience! I was playing an acoustic guitar with a pick-up. Um, flat-top guitar, and Jimi was playing an electric. Yeah, what a lovely time! Had he lived today, you'd find that he would be employing everything he could get his hands on, and I mean acoustic guitar, synthesizers, orchestras, voices, anything he could get his hands on he'd use!"

He played on Miles Davis' albums In a Silent Way, Bitches Brew (which has a track titled after him), Live-Evil, On the Corner, Big Fun (where he is featured soloist on "Go Ahead John") and A Tribute to Jack Johnson. In the liner notes to Jack Johnson, Davis called McLaughlin's playing "far in". McLaughlin returned to the Davis band for one night of a week-long club date, recorded and released as part of the album Live-Evil and of the Cellar Door boxed set. His reputation as a "first-call" session player grew, resulting in recordings as a sideman with Miroslav Vitous, Larry Coryell, Joe Farrell, Wayne Shorter, Carla Bley, the Rolling Stones, and others.

=== 1970s ===
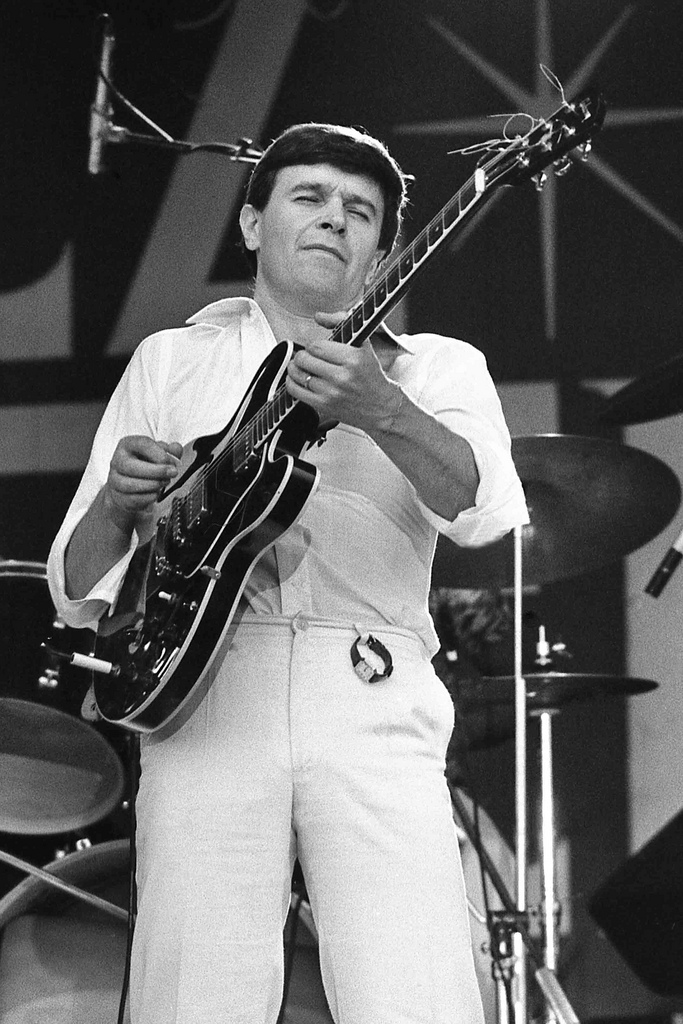
McLaughlin performing in The Netherlands, 1978

McLaughlin recorded Devotion in early 1970 for Douglas Records (run by Alan Douglas), a high-energy, psychedelic fusion album that featured Larry Young on organ (who had been part of Lifetime), Billy Rich on bass and the R&B drummer Buddy Miles. Devotion was the first of two albums he released on Douglas. In 1971 he released My Goal's Beyond in the US, a collection of unamplified acoustic works. Side A ("Peace One" and "Peace Two") offers a fusion blend of jazz and Indian classical forms, while side B features melodic acoustic playing on such standards as "Goodbye Pork Pie Hat", by Charles Mingus whom McLaughlin considered an important influence. My Goal's Beyond was inspired by McLaughlin's decision to follow the Indian spiritual leader Sri Chinmoy, to whom he had been introduced in 1970 by Larry Coryell's manager. The album was dedicated to Chinmoy, with one of the Guru's poems printed on the liner notes. It was on this album that McLaughlin took the name "Mahavishnu".

In 1973, McLaughlin collaborated with Carlos Santana, also a disciple of Sri Chinmoy at the time, on an album of devotional songs, Love Devotion Surrender, which featured recordings of Coltrane compositions including a movement of A Love Supreme. McLaughlin has also worked with the jazz composers Carla Bley and Gil Evans.

==== The Mahavishnu Orchestra ====
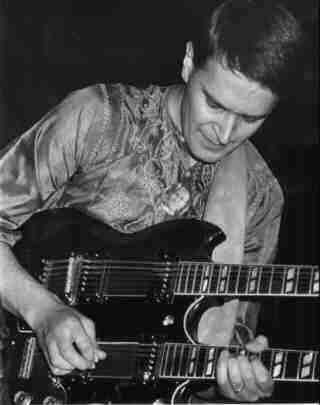
John McLaughlin, Circus Krone-Bau, Munich, West Germany, 9 June 1973

McLaughlin's 1970s electric band, the Mahavishnu Orchestra, included violinist Jerry Goodman, keyboardist Jan Hammer, bassist Rick Laird, and drummer Billy Cobham. They performed a technically difficult and complex style of music that fused electric jazz and rock with Eastern, Classical, and Indian influences. This band helped establish fusion as a new and growing style. McLaughlin's playing at this time was distinguished by fast solos and non-western musical scales.

The first incarnation of the Mahavishnu Orchestra split in late 1973 after two years and three albums, including a live recording Between Nothingness & Eternity, due to personality clashes and overwork imposed by their management; Jan Hammer and Jerry Goodman were among the outspoken members who disputed with McLaughlin's leadership, religious beliefs and songwriting credits. Upon reading an article from Crawdaddy Magazine en route to Japan for a tour, McLaughlin was offended by the writeups and disparagement of his religious beliefs. Goodman reconciled with McLaughlin, several years after the breakup. In 1999 the Lost Trident Sessions album was released; recorded in 1973 but shelved when the group disbanded.

McLaughlin then reformed the group with Narada Michael Walden (drums), Jean-Luc Ponty (violin), Ralphe Armstrong (bass), and Gayle Moran (keyboards and vocals), and a string and horn section with Premik Russell Tubbs playing saxophone, (McLaughlin referred to this as "the real Mahavishnu Orchestra"). This incarnation of the group recorded two albums, Apocalypse, with the London Symphony Orchestra, and Visions of the Emerald Beyond. During the second lineup, McLaughlin had a double-neck electric guitar built by Rex Bogue. When the guitar broke, in a tour for Visions of the Emerald Beyond, McLaughlin began to have a musical and spiritual crisis; He became disillusioned with the teachings of Sri Chinmoy and eventually disavowed Chinmoy's teachings. McLaughlin stated in 1976 for People Magazine, "I love [Sri Chinmoy] very much, but I must assume responsibility for my own actions". A scaled-down quartet was formed with McLaughlin, Walden on drums, Armstrong on bass and Stu Goldberg on keyboards and synthesiser, for their final album in the 1970s, Inner Worlds, which was released in February 1976, largely due to contractual obligations.

==== Shakti ====
McLaughlin then became absorbed in his acoustic playing with his Indian classical music based group Shakti (energy). McLaughlin had already been studying Indian classical music and playing the veena for several years. The group featured Lakshminarayanan L. Shankar (violin), Zakir Hussain (tabla), Thetakudi Harihara Vinayakram (ghatam) and earlier Ramnad Raghavan (mridangam). The group recorded three albums: Shakti with John McLaughlin (1975) A Handful of Beauty (1976), and Natural Elements (1977). Based on both Carnatic and Hindustani styles, along with extended use of konnakol, the band introduced ragas and Indian percussion to many jazz aficionados.

In this group McLaughlin played a custom-made steel-string J-200 acoustic guitar made by Abe Wechter and the Gibson guitar company that featured two tiers of strings over the soundhole: a conventional six-string configuration and seven strings strung underneath at a 45-degree angle – these were independently tuneable "sympathetic strings" much like those on a sitar or veena. The instrument's vina-like scalloped fretboard enabled McLaughlin to bend strings far beyond the reach of a conventional fretboard. McLaughlin grew so accustomed to the freedom it provided him that he had the fretboard scalloped on his Gibson Byrdland electric guitar.

==== Other activities ====
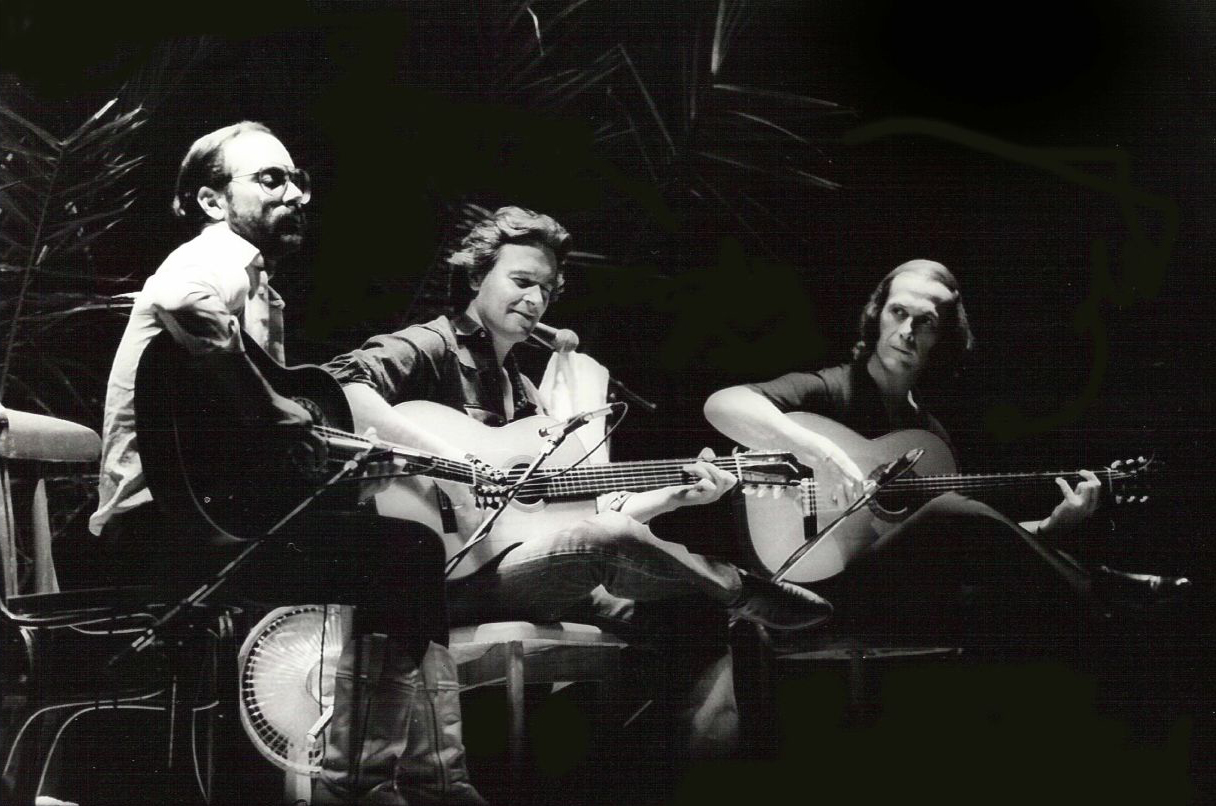
Left to right: Al Di Meola, John McLaughlin, and Paco de Lucía performing in Barcelona, Spain in the 1980s

In 1979, McLaughlin formed a short-lived funk fusion power trio named Trio of Doom with drummer Tony Williams and bassist Jaco Pastorius. Their only live performance was on 3 March 1979 at the Havana Jam Festival (2–4 March 1979) in Cuba, part of a US State Department sponsored visit to Cuba. Later on 8 March 1979, the group recorded the songs they had written for the festival at CBS Studios in New York, on 52nd Street. Recollections from this performance are captured on Ernesto Juan Castellanos's documentary Havana Jam '79 and the archival album, Trio of Doom. McLaughlin also appeared on Stanley Clarke's School Days and numerous other fusion albums.

The same year, McLaughlin teamed up with flamenco guitarist Paco de Lucía and jazz guitarist Larry Coryell (replaced by Al Di Meola in the early 1980s) as the Guitar Trio. For the tour of fall 1983 they were joined by Dixie Dregs guitarist Steve Morse who opened the show as a soloist and participated with The Trio in the closing numbers. The Trio reunited in 1996 for a second recording session and a world tour. Also in 1979 McLaughlin recorded the album Johnny McLaughlin: Electric Guitarist, the title on McLaughlin's first business cards as a teenager in Yorkshire. This was a return to more mainstream jazz/rock fusion and to the electric instrument after three years of playing acoustic guitars.

=== 1980s ===
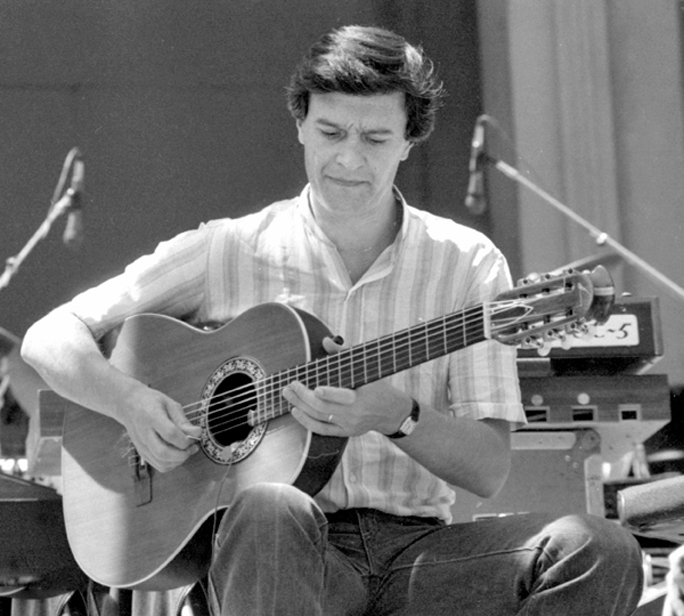
John McLaughlin at Berkeley Jazz Festival 5/25/1980

The short-lived One Truth Band recorded one studio album, Electric Dreams, with L. Shankar on violins, Stu Goldberg on keyboards, Fernando Saunders on electric bass and Tony Smith on drums. After the dissolution of the One Truth Band, McLaughlin toured in a guitar duo with Christian Escoudé.

With the group Fuse One, he released one album in 1980.

In 1981 and 1982, McLaughlin recorded two albums, Belo Horizonte and Music Spoken Here with The Translators, a band of French and American musicians who combined acoustic guitar, bass, drums, saxophone, and violin with synthesizers. The Translators included McLaughlin's then-girlfriend, classical pianist Katia Labèque.

From 1984 through to (circa) 1987, an electric five-piece operated under the name "Mahavishnu" (omitting the "Orchestra"). Two LPs were released, Mahavishnu and Adventures in Radioland. The former featured McLaughlin making extensive use of the Synclavier synthesizer, allied with a Roland guitar/controller. The first of the two albums was recorded with a line-up of McLaughlin, Bill Evans (saxophones), Jonas Hellborg (bass), Mitchel Forman (keyboards) and both Danny Gottlieb and Billy Cobham on drums. Initial advertising for concert dates in support of the album included Cobham's name, but by the time the tour started in earnest, Gottlieb was in the band. Forman left at some point between the albums, and was replaced on keyboards by Jim Beard.

In tandem with Mahavishnu, McLaughlin worked in duo format (c. 1985–87) with bassist Jonas Hellborg, playing a number of concert dates, some of which were broadcast on radio and TV, but no commercial recordings were made.

In 1985 McLaughlin was reunited with Miles Davis once more on having worked the You're Under Arrest album. He would also appear on Davis' concept album Aura four year later.

In 1986, he appeared with Dexter Gordon in Bertrand Tavernier's film Round Midnight. He also composed The Mediterranean Concerto, orchestrated by Michael Gibbs. The world premier featured McLaughlin and the Los Angeles Philharmonic. It was recorded in 1988 with Michael Tilson Thomas conducting the London Symphony Orchestra. Unlike what is typical practice in classical music, the concerto includes sections where McLaughlin improvises. Also included on the recording were five duets between McLaughlin and his then-girlfriend Katia Labèque.

In the late 1980s, McLaughlin began performing live and recording with a trio including percussionist Trilok Gurtu, and three bassists at various times; firstly Jeff Berlin, then Kai Eckhardt and finally Dominique Di Piazza. Berlin contributed to the trio's live work only in 1988/89, and didn't record with McLaughlin. The group recorded two albums: Live at The Royal Festival Hall and Que Alegria, the former with Eckhardt, and the latter with di Piazza for all but two tracks. These recordings saw a return to acoustic instruments for McLaughlin, performing on nylon-string guitar. On Live at the Royal Festival Hall McLaughlin used a unique guitar synth that enabled him to effectively "loop" guitar parts and play over them live. The synth also featured a pedal that provided sustain. McLaughlin overdubbed parts to create lush soundscapes, aided by Gurtu's unique percussive sounds. He used this approach to great effect in the track Florianapolis, among others.

=== 1990s ===
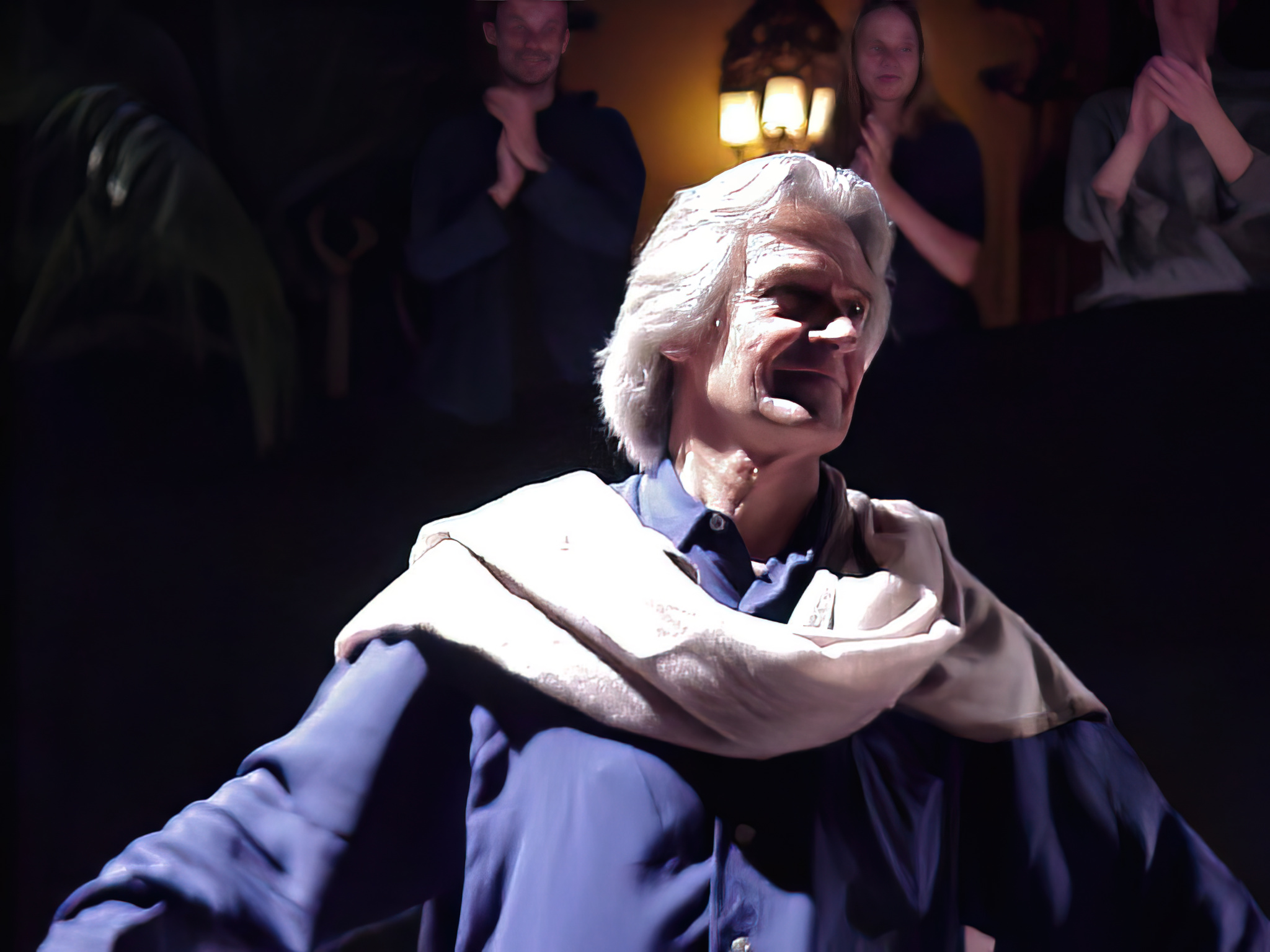
John McLaughlin, Remember Shakti Concert, Munich/Germany (2001)

In the early 1990s, McLaughlin toured with his trio on the Qué Alegría album. By this time, Eckhardt had left, with McLaughlin and Gurtu joined by bass player Dominique Di Piazza. In the latter stages of this trio's life, they were joined on tour by Katia Labèque alone, or by Katia and her sister Marielle, with footage of the latter configuration forming part of a documentary on the Labèque Sisters. Following this period he recorded and toured with The Heart of Things featuring Gary Thomas, Dennis Chambers, Matt Garrison, Jim Beard and Otmaro Ruíz. In 1993 he released a Bill Evans tribute album entitled Time Remembered: John McLaughlin Plays Bill Evans, with McLaughlin's acoustic guitar backed by the acoustic guitars of the Aighetta Quartet and the acoustic bass of Yan Maresz.

In 1994, McLaughlin and Trilok Gurtu composed the soundtrack to the drama film Molom, conte de Mongolie, (Note: English: Molom: A Legend of Mongolia) directed by Marie-Jaoul de Poncheville. The film was praised for its visual aspects, authenticity and acting by outlets such as The New York Times and Variety; Conversely, reception to the soundtrack was mixed, as Variety considered McLaughlin and Gurtu's score "too contemporary to mesh", while remarking that the Mongolian folk music in the soundtrack was "pleasant".

McLaughlin formed a group, Remember Shakti and toured with them; In addition to original Shakti member Zakir Hussain, this group has also featured eminent Indian musicians U. Srinivas, V. Selvaganesh, Shankar Mahadevan, Shivkumar Sharma, and Hariprasad Chaurasia. In 1996, John McLaughlin, Paco de Lucia and Al Di Meola (known collectively as "The Guitar Trio") reunited for a world tour and recorded an album of the same name. They had previously released a studio album entitled Passion, Grace & Fire back in 1983. Meanwhile, in the same year of 1996 McLaughlin recorded The Promise. Also notable during the period were his performances with Elvin Jones and Joey DeFrancesco.

=== 2000s ===
In 2003, McLaughlin recorded a ballet score, Thieves and Poets, along with arrangements for classical guitar ensemble of favourite jazz standards and a three-DVD instructional video on improvisation entitled "This is the Way I Do It" (which contributed to the development of video lessons.) In June 2006 he released the post-bop/jazz fusion album Industrial Zen, on which he experimented with the Godin Glissentar as well as continuing to expand his guitar-synth repertoire.

In 2007, he left Universal Records and joined Abstract Logix. Recording sessions for his first album on that label took place in April. That summer, he began touring with a new jazz fusion quartet, the 4th Dimension, consisting of keyboardist/drummer Gary Husband, bassist Hadrien Feraud, and drummer Mark Mondesir. During the 4th Dimension's tour, an "instant CD" entitled Live USA 2007: Official Bootleg was made available comprising soundboard recordings of six pieces from the group's first performance. Following completion of the tour, McLaughlin sorted through recordings from each night to release a second MP3 download-only collection entitled, Official Pirate: Best of the American Tour 2007. During this time, McLaughlin also released another instructional DVD, The Gateway to Rhythm, featuring Indian percussionist and Remember Shakti bandmate Selva Ganesh Vinayakram (or V. Selvaganesh), focusing on the Indian rhythmic system of konnakol. McLaughlin also remastered and released the shelved 1979 Trio of Doom project with Jaco Pastorius and Tony Williams. The project had been aborted due to conflicts between Williams and Pastorius as well as what was at the time a mutual dissatisfaction with the results of their performance.

On 28 July 2007, McLaughlin performed at Eric Clapton's Crossroads Guitar Festival in Bridgeview, Illinois.

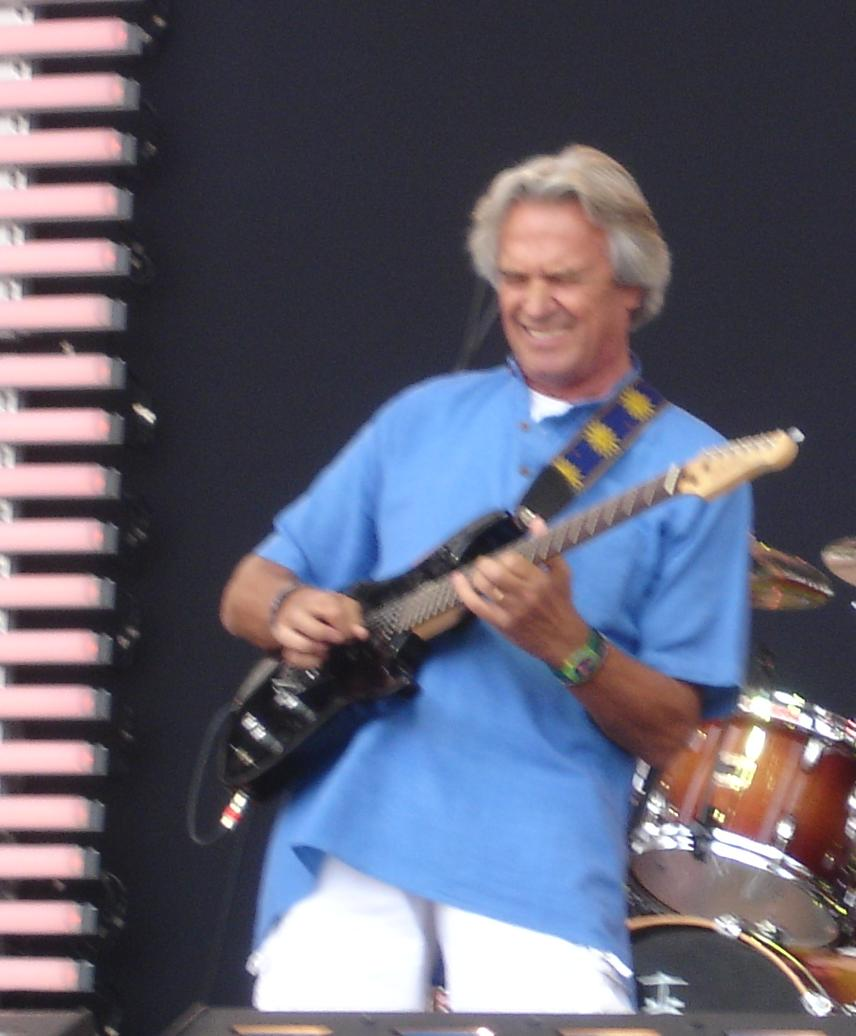
McLaughlin, 2007 Crossroads Guitar Festival

On 28 April 2008, the recording sessions from the previous year surfaced on the album Floating Point, featuring the rhythm section of keyboardist Louis Banks, bassist Hadrien Feraud, percussionist Sivamani and drummer Ranjit Barot bolstered on each track by a different Indian musician. Coinciding with the release of the album was another DVD, Meeting of the Minds, which offered behind the scenes studio footage of the Floating Point sessions as well as interviews with all of the musicians. He engaged in a late summer/fall 2008 tour with Chick Corea, Vinnie Colaiuta, Kenny Garrett and Christian McBride under the name Five Peace Band, from which came an eponymous double-CD live album in early 2009.

McLaughlin performed with Mahavishnu Orchestra drummer Billy Cobham at the 44th Montreux Jazz Festival, in Montreux, Switzerland, on 2 July 2010, for the first time since the band split up. In November 2010, a book was released by Abstract Logix Books entitled Follow Your Heart - John McLaughlin Song by Song by Walter Kolosky, who also wrote the book Power, Passion and Beauty – The Story of the Legendary Mahavishnu Orchestra. The book discussed each song McLaughlin wrote and contained photographs never seen before.

In 2017, McLaughlin headlined the Meeting of the Spirits Tour with his band, The 4th Dimension, and Jimmy Herring's band, the Invisible Whip. The 4th Dimension featured McLaughlin, guitar; Gary Husband, keyboards and drums; Etienne M'Bappe, bass; and Ranjit Barat, drums and vocals. The Invisible Whip featured Herring, guitar; Jeff Sipe, drums; Matt Slocum, Hammond B3 and clavinet; Jason Crosby, violin and Fender Rhodes; and Kevin Scott, bass. The two bands typically would jam for the closing third set of concerts. They collaborated to record an album entitled Live in San Francisco at The Warfield in San Francisico on December 8, 2017. The tracks were all Mahavishnu pieces from the 1970's.

== Artistry ==
McLaughlin is a leading guitarist in jazz and jazz fusion. His style has been described as one that incorporates aggressive speed, technical precision, and harmonic sophistication. He is known for using non-Western scales and unconventional time signatures. Indian music has had a profound influence on his style, and he has been described as one of the first Westerners to play Indian music to Indian audiences. He was influential in bringing jazz fusion to popularity with Miles Davis, playing with Davis on five of his studio albums, including Davis' first gold-certified Bitches Brew, and one live album, Live-Evil. Speaking of himself, McLaughlin has stated that the guitar is simply "part of his body", and he feels more comfortable when a guitar is present.

Although a successful and critically acclaimed artist, some musicians consider McLaughlin's fast alternate picking and unorthodox note choices to be one of his shortcomings. Frank Zappa, who toured with the Mahavishnu Orchestra in May 1973, was indifferent to McLaughlin's fast picking, and made some back-handed compliments to the English player:

A person would be a moron not to appreciate McLaughlin's technique. The guy has certainly found out how to operate a guitar as if it were a machine gun. But I'm not always enthusiastic about the lines I hear or the ways in which they're used. I don't think you can fault him, though, for the amount of time and effort it must have taken to play an instrument that fast. I think anybody who can play that fast is just wonderful. And I'm sure 90% of teenage America would agree, since the whole trend in the business has been "faster is better."

Decades later, McLaughlin issued a rebuke to Zappa's "machine gun" comment. Although he conceded that Zappa "has every right to his opinions", McLaughlin countered Zappa's criticism by saying "he was just jealous!" McLaughlin was also critical of Zappa's lead playing, especially on a live setting. "While I’ve always enjoyed his recordings, on tour he would take very, very long guitar solos, and he just didn’t have what it takes to play long guitar solos", said the English musician.

Guitarist Ritchie Blackmore of Deep Purple was not favourable to the musicianship of McLaughlin and his contemporary, Carlos Santana, although he appreciated the musicianship of Mahavishnu Orchestra members Billy Cobham and Jerry Goodman. In a 1974 interview to Cameron Crowe, Blackmore stated:

People must be completely sick of guitar solos by now. I think my solos are better than the others, without being conceited, but still, if I wasn't a musician I'd be bored stiff. [...]. The guitar has become too trendy. People like John McLaughlin... he's a jazz guitarist who thought that playing with a fuzz would make him a rock 'n roller. He leaves me cold. He’s influencing a lot of people, though, whereas the Santana guy is just plain rotten. I don't why he's got such a name.

== Influence ==
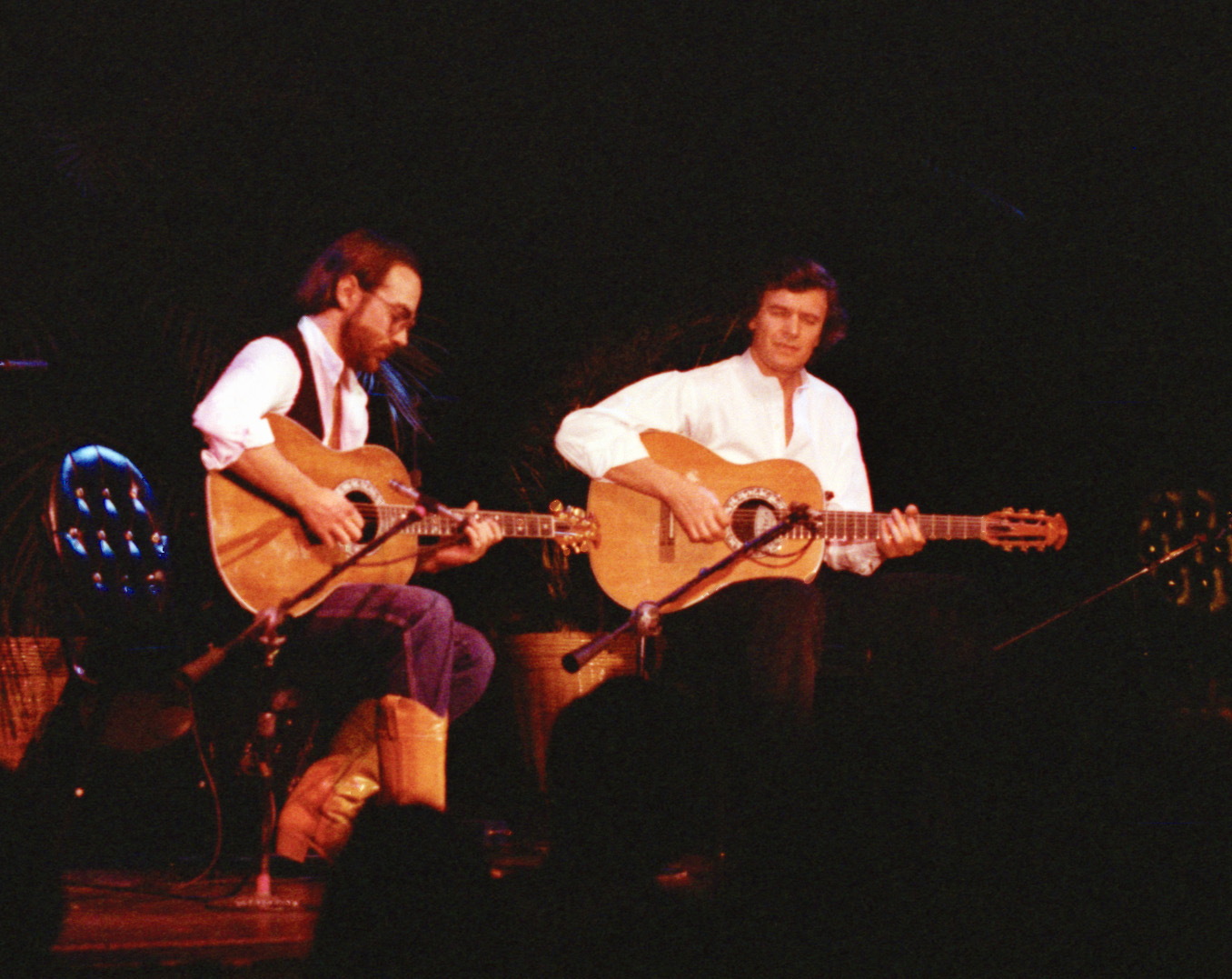
Al Di Meola and John McLaughlin in 1979

In 2010, Jeff Beck said: "John McLaughlin has given us so many different facets of the guitar. And introduced thousands of us to world music, by blending Indian music with jazz and classical. I'd say he was the best guitarist alive." McLaughlin has been cited as a major influence on many 1970s and 1980s guitarists, including prominent players such as Steve Morse, Gary Moore, Eric Johnson, Mike Stern, Al Di Meola, Shawn Lane, Scott Henderson, Adonis Mitzelos of PLJ Band and Trevor Rabin of Yes. Mitzelos dedicated the track "Kucucata" to him from his solo album Beyond the Light (2000), which features members of the American jazz-fusion band Spyro Gyra.

Other players who acknowledge his influence include Omar Rodríguez-López of the Mars Volta, Paul Masvidal of Cynic, and Ben Weinman of the Dillinger Escape Plan. According to Pat Metheny, McLaughlin has changed the evolution of the guitar during several of his periods of playing. Johnny Marr of the Smiths called McLaughlin "the greatest guitar player that's ever lived".

McLaughlin is considered a major influence on composers in the fusion genre. In an interview with Downbeat, Chick Corea remarked that "what John McLaughlin did with the electric guitar set the world on its ear. No one ever heard an electric guitar played like that before, and it certainly inspired me. John's band, more than my experience with Miles, led me to want to turn the volume up and write music that was more dramatic and made your hair stand on end."

The musician and comedian Darryl Rhoades also paid tribute to McLaughlin's influence. In the 1970s, he led the "Hahavishnu Orchestra", which did parodies of the funk, rock and jazz musical styles of the era.

== Personal life ==
McLaughlin was married to Eve when he was a disciple of Sri Chinmoy. For a time he lived with the French pianist Katia Labèque, who was also a member of his band in the early 1980s. As of 2017, McLaughlin is married to his fourth wife, Ina Behrend. They had a son in 1998. Since the late 1980s, he has lived in Monaco. McLaughlin is a pescetarian.

McLaughlin, alongside Behrend, supports a Palestinian music therapy organization, Al-Mada, who run a program called "For My Identity I Sing". McLaughlin performed in Ramallah, Palestine, in 2012 with Zakir Hussain and in 2014 with 4th Dimension.

== Discography ==
- Extrapolation (1969)
- Devotion (1970)
- My Goal's Beyond (1971; credited as Mahavishnu John McLaughlin)
- Electric Guitarist (1978)
- Electric Dreams (1979; with the One Truth Band)
- Friday Night in San Francisco (1981; with Al Di Meola and Paco de Lucía)
- Belo Horizonte (1981)
- Music Spoken Here (1982)
- Concerto for Guitar & Orchestra "The Mediterranean" – Duos for Guitar & Piano (1990; with London Symphony Orchestra and Katia Labèque)
- Time Remembered: John McLaughlin Plays Bill Evans (1993)
- After the Rain (1995; with Joey DeFrancesco and Elvin Jones)
- The Promise (1995)
- The Heart of Things (1997)
- Thieves and Poets (2003)
- Industrial Zen (2006)
- Floating Point (2008)
- To the One (2010; with the 4th Dimension)
- Now Here This (2012; with the 4th Dimension)
- Black Light (2015; with the 4th Dimension)
- Liberation Time (2021)
- Music for Abandoned Heights (2026; with Julian Siegel, Misha Mullov-Abbado, Etienne Mbappé and Gary Husband)

== Awards and nominations ==
DownBeat

- 1972: Jazz Album of the Year - The Inner Mounting Flame from Mahavishnu Orchestra
- 1972: Pop Album of the Year - The Inner Mounting Flame from Mahavishnu Orchestra
- Guitarist of the year - multiple years - John McLaughlin
- 2024: Hall of Fame

Grammy Awards

- 1973: Best Pop Instrumental Performance – "The Inner Mounting Flame" from The Inner Mounting Flame with Mahavishnu Orchestra
- 1974: Best Pop Instrumental Performance – "Birds of Fire" from Birds of Fire with Mahavishnu Orchestra
- 1997: Best Pop Collaboration with Vocals – "The Wind Cries Mary" from In From the Storm with Sting, Dominic Miller and Vinnie Colaiuta
- 2002: Best World Music Album – Saturday Night in Bombay with Remember Shakti
- 2009: Best Contemporary Jazz Album – Floating Point
- 2010: Best Jazz Instrumental Album, Individual or Group – Five Peace Band Live with Chick Corea & Five Peace Band
- 2026: Best Global Music Album nomination for Mind Explosion (50th Anniversary Tour Live) and Best Global Music Performance nomination for Shrini's Dream (Live).

Guitar Player Magazine

Annual Readers Poll Awards

- 1973: Best Jazz Guitarist
- 1974: Best Jazz Guitarist
- 1975: Best Jazz Guitarist
- 1974: Best Overall Guitarist
- 1975: Best Overall Guitarist
- 1992: Acoustic Pickstyle

== Equipment ==
- Gibson EDS-1275 – McLaughlin played the Gibson doubleneck between 1971 and 1973, his first years with the Mahavishnu Orchestra; this is the guitar which, amplified through a 100-watt Marshall amplifier "in meltdown mode", produced the signature McLaughlin sound hailed by Guitar Player as one of the "50 Greatest Tones of All Time".
- Double Rainbow doubleneck guitar made by Rex Bogue, which McLaughlin played from 1973 to 1975.
- The first Abraham Wechter-built acoustic "Shakti guitar", a customised Gibson J-200 with drone strings transversely across the soundhole.
- Gibson Byrdland with a scalloped fingerboard on albums Inner Worlds and Electric Guitarist
- Gibson ES-345 with a scalloped fingerboard on albums Electric Dreams and Trio of Doom
- He has also played Godin electric/MIDI guitars. He discusses the Godin and other gear in an interview for Premier Guitar online.
- McLaughlin endorses PRS guitars.
