= Art metal (disambiguation) =

Art metal may refer to:

- Avant-garde metal, heavy metal music that emphasises experimentation and unconventional techniques
- Neoclassical metal, heavy metal strongly influenced by classical music
- Post-metal, music that is rooted in heavy metal but discards many of its conventions
- Progressive metal, a fusion of heavy metal with progressive rock
- Art Metal (band), a Swedish band led by Jonas Hellborg
  - Art Metal (album), the band's debut album
- Art rock, a subgenre of rock music
