= Freak Guitar: The Smorgasbord =

2013 studio album by Mattias Eklundh

Studio album by Mattias IA Eklundh
- Released: 13 March 2013
- Label: Favored Nations
- Producer: Mattias IA Eklundh

Mattias IA Eklundh chronology
Freak Guitar: The Road Less Traveled (2005)	Freak Guitar: The Smorgasbord (2013)

Freak Guitar: The Smorgasbord is a double-disc studio album by Mattias IA Eklundh, released on Steve Vai's Favored Nations label on 5 March 2013. It features close to two hours of eclectic, mostly instrumental guitar music, with a variety of influences.

== Reception ==
The album was reviewed in the April 2013 issue of Guitarist magazine, where it was given 4.5 stars out of 5 and recommended for fans of Vai and Frank Zappa. Total Guitar gave it 4 stars out of 5.

== Guests performers ==
The album features a number of guest musicians, including:

- Ron "Bumblefoot" Thal – solo on "Special Agent Bauer"
- V. Selvaganesh – kanjira on "Kali Ghat", "Those in Badiyah", "Mandur and Morgan's Camel Safari", "Friedrichs Wahnbriefe"
- Dweezil Zappa – solo on "Mind Your Step (at Schiphol Airport)"
- Andy Timmons – first and fourth solos on "Peter, I Won't Drive Another Meter"; solo on "Those in Badiyah"
- Guthrie Govan – second and fifth solos on "Peter, I Won't Drive Another Meter"
- Kiko Loureiro – third and sixth solos on "Peter, I Won't Drive Another Meter"
- Jan Laney – "Peter, I won't Drive Another Meter"
- Björn Fryklund – drums on "The Smorgasbord", "Crossing the Rubicon", "Peter, I Won't Drive Another Meter", "In the Goo of the Evening"
- Serge Levaillant – vocals on "Mattias – The Beautiful Guy"
- Jonas Hellborg – bass on "Kali Ghat"
- Gabriel Eklundh – screams and various vocal sounds throughout "Blaha Blaha"
- Kevin Fickling – vocals on "Special Agent Bauer"
- Morgan Ågren – drums, percussion on "Meralgia Paresthetica"
- Zac O'Yeah – zombie grunts on "Mandur and Morgan's Camel Safari"
- Ranjit Barot – drums on "Keep It in the Dojo"
- Fredrik Thordendal – solo on "Friedrichs Wahnbriefe"

== Track listing ==
=== CD1 ===
1. "Amphibians Night Out" – 3:32
2. "Musth" – 3:12
3. "Mattias – The Beautiful Guy" – 2:27
4. "Hells Bells" – 3:40
5. "The Smorgasbord" – 2:52
6. "Friedrichs Wahnbriefe" – 3:08
7. "Sexually Frustrated Fruit Fly Flamenco" – 0:41
8. "Daily Grind Disco March" – 2:46
9. "Lease with an Option to Buy" – 2:23
10. "The Swede and the Wolf" – 4:20
11. "Mambo Italiano" – 2:18
12. "Mind Your Step (at Schiphol Airport)" – 3:34
13. "Crossing the Rubicon" – 7:48
14. "That's Amore" – 2:27
15. "Keep it in the Dojo" – 2:41
16. "Infrared Jed" – 0:33
17. "Peter, I Won't Drive Another Meter" – 4:35
18. "Larvatus Prodeo" – 1:15
19. "Blaha Blaha" – 2:31
20. "Lullaby for Gabriel" – 2:25

=== CD2 ===
1. "In the Goo of the Evening" – 3:12
2. "The Dogs of Delhi" – 2:16
3. "Special Agent Bauer" – 2:07
4. "Mahavishnu John" – 3:34
5. "The Harry Lime Theme" – 1:28
6. "Dark Matter" – 2:48
7. "Trumpet Lesson" – 0:53
8. "Mandur and Morgan's Camel Safari" – 3:13
9. "Shore Thing" – 2:14
10. "Captain Smith's Moment of Truth" – 1:35
11. "Mah Nà Mah Nà" – 2:39
12. "The Nigerian Gynecologist" – 3:25
13. "6 Rue Cordot" – 1:17
14. "Kali Ghat" – 4:37
15. "Safe to Remove Hardware" – 1:30
16. "Did You Actually Pay for That?" – 2:45
17. "Those in Badiyah" – 3:46
18. "The Essence of Emptiness" – 4:37
19. "Meralgia Paresthetica" – 4:51
20. "Guano Afternoon" – 1:46

== Credits ==
All songs are written by Mattias IA Eklundh, except the following:

- "Hells Bells" – Angus Young, Malcolm Young, Brian Johnson
- "Mambo Italiano" – Bob Merrill
- "That's Amore" – Harry Warren, Jack Brooks
- "The Harry Lime Theme" – Anton Karas
- "Mandur and Morgan's Camel Safari" – music by Eklundh, lyrics by Eklundh and Zac O'Yeah
- "Mah Nà Mah Nà" – Piero Umiliani
- "Kali Ghat" – Jonas Hellborg, V. Selvaganesh
- "Those in Badiyah" – Jonas Hellborg, V. Selvaganesh, Eklundh
