= The Tri-Tone Fascination =

Studio album by Shawn Lane
- Released: 1999
- Recorded: Sounds Good Recording in Memphis, Tennessee
- Genre: Instrumental rock, jazz fusion
- Length: 53:40
- Label: Eye Reckon
- Producer: Shawn Lane, Les Birchfield

Shawn Lane chronology
Powers of Ten (1992)	The Tri-Tone Fascination (1999)	Powers of Ten; Live! (2001)

Alternative cover
- 2000 reissue

Professional ratings
Review scores
Source	Rating
AllMusic	3/5 stars

The Tri-Tone Fascination is the second and final studio album by guitarist Shawn Lane, released in 1999 through Eye Reckon Records; a second edition was re-issued in 2000, containing a revised track listing (with the omission of two selections and inclusion of an alternate piece on the Japanese edition) and different cover art. The opening track, "Kaiser Nancarrow", was inspired by and named after composer Conlon Nancarrow.

== Track listing ==
No.	Title	Writer(s)	Length
1.	"Kaiser Nancarrow"	Shawn Lane, Sean Rickman	4:43
2.	"Peace in Mississippi"	Jimi Hendrix	3:54
3.	"Minarets"	Lane, Luther Dickinson	3:30
4.	"The Way It Has to Be"	Lane	4:39
5.	"Nine=101"	Lane, Jonas Hellborg	4:26
6.	"Art Tatum"	Lane	2:05
7.	"Hardcase"	Lane, John Eatman	4:58
8.	"Trois Sept Cinq"	Lane	4:19
9.	"The Hurt, the Joy"	Lane, Tom Ward	4:00
10.	"One Note at a Time"	Lane	3:30
11.	"Maria"	Lane	5:44
12.	"Song for Diane (World Keeps Spinning)"	Lane	5:23
13.	"Ich ruf zu dir Herr Jesu"	Johann Sebastian Bach; arr. Eduard Artemyev	2:29
Total length:			53:40

2000 reissue
No.	Title	Length
1.	"Kaiser Nancarrow"	4:43
2.	"Peace in Mississippi"	3:54
3.	"Minarets"	3:30
4.	"The Way It Has to Be"	4:39
5.	"Tri 7\5" (originally "Trois Sept Cinq")	4:19
6.	"Art Tatum"	2:05
7.	"The Hurt, the Joy"	4:00
8.	"Maria"	5:44
9.	"One Note at a Time"	3:30
10.	"World Keeps Spinning (Song for Diane)"	5:23
11.	"Epilogue: J.S. Bach (Ich ruf zu dir)" (originally "Ich ruf zu dir Herr Jesu")	2:29
12.	"I Only Want to Know" (Japanese edition bonus track)	4:19
Total length:		44:16

== Personnel ==
- Shawn Lane – vocals, guitar, keyboard (except track 9), drums (except tracks 1, 3, 5), drum machine, bass (except tracks 3, 5, 9), production
- Luther Dickinson – guitar (tracks 3, 5)
- Buddy Davis – guitar (track 9)
- Tom Ward – keyboard (track 9)
- Sean Rickman – drums (track 1)
- Cody Dickinson – drums (tracks 3, 5)
- Paul Taylor – bass (tracks 3, 5)
- Eric Phillips – bass (track 9)
- Les Birchfield – executive production
