= Ars Moriende =

Studio album by Jonas Hellborg
- Released: 1994
- Recorded: at Ragnarpers in Gärsnäs, Sweden with the Day Eight Mobile
- Genre: World music, jazz, rock, fusion, folk, Acoustic
- Length: 64:24
- Label: Day Eight Music
- Producer: Jonas Hellborg

Ars Moriende is an album by bass guitarist Jonas Hellborg, released in 1994 through Day Eight Music. Performed together with percussionist and overtone singer Glen Velez, the recording is a journey into a state of meditation on the subject of life and death. The three relatively long pieces tell a story that's in turn relaxing and impetuous, and simultaneously modern and ancient, familiar and exotic sounding. "As always, Hellborg amazes with his skill and emotiveness." (Walter Kolosky for Jazz.com) The album was awarded a Swedish Grammy for the best instrumental album of the year 1995.

== Album theme ==
This music was written in a period when Hellborg was exploring the reality of Death, its symbolic meanings and its significance in human cultures. To evolve, people often have to die under a certain aspect, to put an end to an identity within, in order to continue with a new life chapter. The piece "Regicide" is inspired by the ritual, common in some ancient cultures, of killing their king at the end of his 7 years rule. This can also be seen as a metaphor for the contemporary public's mindset in making and breaking celebrities - when a star's popularity fades, he's forgotten (symbolically killed) and a new "king" is appointed.

== Instruments ==
Jonas Hellborg plays two acoustic bass guitars on this album, an Ovation and The Roman Bass, an instrument custom built for Hellborg by luthier Abraham Wechter, also heard on some of his other albums (Aram of the Two Rivers, Silent Life, Octave of the Holy Innocents).

Glen Velez, whose rhythms evoke the Middle East, India and Western Europe, uses as a main instrument is the frame drum, which has a drumhead diameter wider than its depth.

== Songs / tracks listing ==
All tracks are written by Jonas Hellborg

| No. | Title | Length |
|---|---|---|
| 1. | "Ritual Love-Death" | 32:38 |
| 2. | "Stars Of The Morning Sky" | 8:24 |
| 3. | "Regicide" | 23:10 |

== Personnel ==
- Cover Art – Dennis Augustsson
- Bass Guitar [Ovation and Wechter Acoustic Bass Guitar] – Jonas Hellborg
- Drums [Frame], Percussion, Voice – Glen Velez
- Engineer – Stephane Jean
- Photography – Shambhala Marthe
- Business Management - Bo Hellborg
- Coordination - Kenneth Rasmusson
- Technician [Instrument] – Ossian Ekman
- Technical Support – Lennart Schander
- Producer – Jonas Hellborg
