= Abstract logic (disambiguation) =

Abstract logic is a formal system consisting of a class of sentences and a satisfaction relation with specific properties.

Abstract logic may also refer to:

- Abstract algebraic logic, the study of the algebraization of deductive systems arising as an abstraction of the Lindenbaum-Tarski algebra
- Abstract Logic (album), a 1995 album by Jonas Hellborg and Shawn Lane
