= Sensually Primitive =

Studio album by Mr Libido
- Released: 1996
- Recorded: Mid to late 1995, in different places during the 1995 tour of Freak Kitchen
- Genre: Experimental rock, electronic rock
- Length: 50:44
- Language: English
- Label: Thunderstruck Productions
- Producer: Mr Libido

Sensually Primitive is a full-length studio album released under the pseudonym Mr Libido by Mattias Eklundh of the progressive metal band Freak Kitchen. The album was released in 1996 after being recorded in mid to late 1995, as the artist states, "...in bed-rooms, basements, living-rooms & kitchens on Mother Earth".

== Track listing ==
1. "The Serious Musician"
2. "How Are We Feeling Today?"
3. "Big Ugly Secret"
4. "Daddy's Box of No-No's"
5. "Your Left Arm"
6. "Train Leaves at 04:00"
7. "Techno Moron"
8. "Not That Kind of Bird"
9. "Herbert the Pervert"
10. "Dead on Arrival"
11. "Sit on My Face"
12. "I Thought It Was a Horse"
13. "Hard to the Core"
14. "Sensually Primitive"
15. "Bit of King"

== Personnel ==
- Mr Libido – vocals and all instruments
