= Temporal Analogues of Paradise =

Live album by Jonas Hellborg
- Released: 1996
- Recorded: November 27, 1995 at Fasching in Stockholm, Sweden; November 28, 1995 at Rackis in Uppsala, Sweden; December 3, 1995 at Quasimodo in Berlin, Germany; December 4, 1995 at Centre Musical Créatif de Nancy in Nancy, France; December 7, 1995 at Le New Morning in Paris, France
- Genre: Jazz fusion
- Length: 58:59
- Label: Day Eight
- Producer: Jonas Hellborg

Jonas Hellborg and Shawn Lane chronology
Abstract Logic (1995)	Temporal Analogues of Paradise (1996)	Time Is the Enemy (1997)

Alternative cover
- 2004 remastered edition

Professional ratings
Review scores
Source	Rating
Allmusic	4/5 stars

Temporal Analogues of Paradise is an album by bassist Jonas Hellborg, with guitarist Shawn Lane and drummer Jeff Sipe, released in 1996 through Day Eight Music; a remastered edition was reissued through Bardo Records in 2004. It was recorded live at different locations in Sweden, France and Germany during the trio's touring in 1995 and 1996.

== Track listing ==
All tracks are written by Jonas Hellborg and Shawn Lane.

No.	Title	Length
1.	"1st Movement"	32:18
2.	"2nd Movement"	27:06
Total length:		58:59

== Personnel ==
- Jonas Hellborg – bass, mixing, production
- Shawn Lane – vocals, guitar
- Jeff Sipe – drums, percussion
- Timmy Fagerlund – engineering
- Scud Noonan – mixing
