= Sean Rickman =

American musician

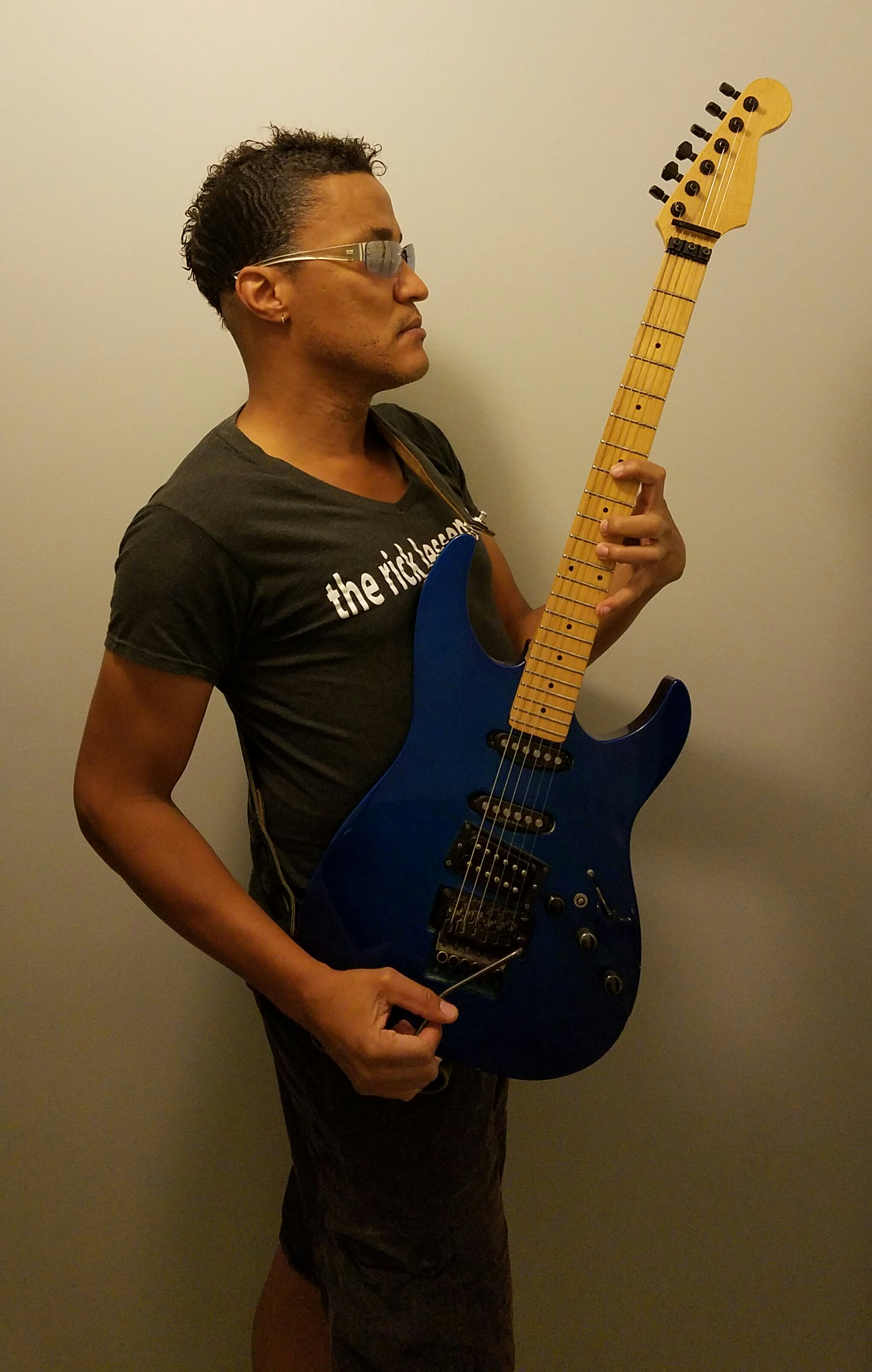
- Rickman in 2016

Background information
- Also known as: The Rick
- Born: Washington, D.C.
- Genres: Rock, rhythm and blues, jazz, funk
- Occupations: Musician, singer, songwriter
- Instruments: Drums, guitar, bass guitar, vocals
- Years active: 1989–present
- Labels: BMG/RCA, Warner Bros
- Member of: Garaj Mahal
- Website: www.therickrocks.com

Sean Rickman is an American musician from Washington, D.C. He has worked with Shawn Lane, Garaj Mahal, Dapp Theory, Steve Coleman, Maxwell, Meshell Ndegeocello, Blacksheep, Phil Upchurch, David Fiucynski and Screaming Headless Torsos, Kai Eckhardt, Anthony Tidd's Quite Sane, K'Alyn, Angela Bofill and George Duke. Rickman was lead singer and drummer for Garaj Mahal from 2007 to 2011 and his rock band Big Mouth featuring guitarist Leonard Stevens. He was also featured alongside Herbie Hancock, Wayne Shorter and Marcus Miller on the Tribute to Miles 2011 tour.

Rickman has toured and recorded with alto saxophonist Steve Coleman, bassist Kai Eckhardt, and guitarist Miles Okazaki. He releases self produced albums under the name "The Rick", performing vocals and all the instruments. He is the lead vocalist and guitarist of his power trio.

== Early life ==
Sean Rickman was born in Georgetown, Washington, D.C., into a musical family. His father, Phil Upchurch, worked as a guitarist and bassist with Michael Jackson, Quincy Jones, B.B. King, George Benson, Curtis Mayfield, Cannonball Adderley, John Lee Hooker, Grover Washington Jr., Lenny Breau, and Dizzy Gillespie. His mother, Renee Morris is a singer who played Mary Magdalene in Jesus Christ Superstar by Andrew Lloyd Webber. His uncle, Joseph Morris, was a drummer with the Ohio University marching band who inspired Rickman's stick grip. Another uncle, Wayne Morris, was a DJ, who exposed him to a record collection without the bounds of genre. Rickman also enjoyed the work of Al Green and Funkadelic at an early age. Rickman exhibited innate musical abilities and was considered a musical prodigy with a remarkable sense of meter. Surrounded by the musical influence of his family, he is said to have begun playing drums around age one, as he began to learn to walk. Throughout primary school and high school, Sean excelled as a musician both intramurally and extramurally. He attended Montgomery College in Rockville, Maryland, in 1988. Taking a jazz improvisation class.

== Career ==
In 1989, Rickman traveled from his hometown, Washington, D.C., to Los Angeles, California, at the request of his father, who introduced him to owner of Third Stone Records and American cinematic music director, Richard Rudolph. Rudolph, known as "Dick" or to his friends and family as "Dickie" was the former husband of Minnie Riperton who Phil Upchurch, Rickman's father, had worked in the short-lived band, Rotary Connection in the 1960s. Rudolph released an album of moderate success with the band Saigon Kick. He later assigned Rickman to work with American record producer, Stewart Levine. Warner/Chappell Music, Inc. signed Rickman to a publishing deal and gave him an advance, used to cover an entertainment attorney, transportation and studio expenses during the remainder of his time in Los Angeles during the late 80s and early 90s. In the early months of 1992, Sean returned to Washington, D.C., and began performing with DC area reggae band Blacksheep. In the final months of 1992, Jamie Brown (owner of Sister2Sister Magazine) recommended Rickman to Kim Jenkins of Ardent Studios in Memphis, Tennessee. Rickman immediately relocated to Memphis and recorded a demo with producer Angelo Earl. Earl placed him with rising star Shawn Lane, whom Rickman instantly recalled from a Guitar Player Magazine article entitled "Unknown Greats" which he had read in years prior. Shawn Lane was sought out and signed by Jim Ed Norman, President of Warner Bros. Records in Nashville. Eventually the group toured the US with Robben Ford and released Shawn Lane's Powers of Ten album which was produced by the legendary Andy Johns. This was followed with the Tri Tone Fascination album release along with two instructional videos on REH video. In 1993, Rickman again relocated to Los Angeles to perform with his father, veteran musician Phil Upchurch. They toured Europe and performed in the Southern California area. Producer Angelo Earl relocated to Los Angeles to work with him, but they both returned to their hometowns following a devastating 6.7 magnitude earthquake in January 1994. After living in Washington, D.C., for a short period of time, Angela Bofill hired him on the spot after watching him perform in Washington, D.C., with keyboardist Federico Gonzalez Peña and alto saxophonist Marshall Keys. In 1994–1996 Rickman began touring with Angela Bofill, and working on her album Love in Slow Motion. While in New York, drummer Gene Lake Jr suggested Rickman to Steve Coleman. After an audition including a host of veteran drummers, Coleman hired 25-year-old Rickman. For the years 1996 through 2002, Rickman toured and recorded four albums with Coleman. In 1996 Rickman began touring with Maxwell.

In 1999 Rickman joined and produced albums with the group Dapp Theory. The group featured pianist/composer Andy Milne. Sean recorded, produced and toured with the group for the albums New Age of Aquarius, Y'all Just Don't Know and Layers of Chance. He remained with Dapp Theory until 2007. In 2000 Rickman toured with Meshell Ndegeocello (with keyboardist Peña) as well as performing on her album, Cookie. In 2002 the DVD entitled Compositional Drumming was released, followed by clinics and lessons in the US. In 2007 Rickman joined the fusion band Garaj Mahal and remained with the group until 2011.

In 2011 Rickman was selected as drummer for the Tribute To Miles 2011 European tour which featured Marcus Miller, Herbie Hancock and Wayne Shorter. In 2012 Rickman re-united with Steve Coleman, releasing Functional Arrhythmias. Later after continued touring, college workshops and residencies, Coleman's band Five Elements performed and recorded at the legendary Village Vanguard in New York City releasing Live At The Village Vanguard Volume I (The Embedded Sets). Then the followup, Live At The Village Vanguard II (MDW NTR).

In 2015 Sean joined former Five Elements guitarist Miles Okazaki forming the group Trickster releasing Trickster (2016) The Sky Below (2019), Thisness (2021) and Live In Brooklyn (2023).

Sean released his first solo album One (2012) under his artist name "The Rick". The album features original material in which he sings all lead and background vocals, as well as performs guitar, bass and drums. He then followed up with Zoom (2016). His third solo release Archives (2021) features unreleased originals from earlier 8 track demos showcasing his intensity as an unknown guitarist. The latest release Oh So Very Much (2024) is where the songs were first written from the drums without music and arrangements. The Rick stated "Writing from the drums without music gives me unpredictability in which I create an unusual rhythmic song format, as opposed to traditional time keeping with most popular Western music."

== Discography ==
=== The Rick ===
- One (Zone One, 2012)
- Zoom (Zone One, 2016)
- Archives (Zone One, 2021)
- Oh So Very Much (Zone One, 2024)

=== As sideman ===
With Steve Coleman

- Genesis & the Opening of the Way (BMG/RCA, 1998)
- Sonic Language of Myth Believing, Learning, Knowing (BMG/RCA, 1999)
- The Ascension to Light (BMG/RCA, 2000)
- Alternate Dimension Series I (Label Bleu, 2002)
- Resistance Is Futile (Label Bleu, 2002)
- On the Rising of the 64 Paths (Label Bleu, 2003)]
- Functional Arrhythmias (Pi, 2013)
- Live at the Village Vanguard Vol. 1 (Pi Recordings, 2018)
- Live at the Village Vanguard Vol. 2 (Pi Recordings, 2021)
- Polytropos/Of Many Turns (Pi Recordings, 2024)

With Shawn Lane

- Powers of Ten (Warner Bros., 1992)
- Powers of Ten; Live! (King, 2001)
- The Tri-Tone Fascination (Eye Reckon, 2001)

With others

- Angela Bofill, Love in Slow Motion (Shanachie, 1996)
- Andy Milne, New Age of Aquarius (Contrology, 2000)
- Kai Eckhardt, Honour Simplicity, Respect the Flow (Naim, 2000)
- Dapp Theory, Y'all Just Don't Know (Concord, 2003)
- Anthony Tidd, Quite Sane/The Child of Troubled Times (Coolhunter, 2002)
- Meshell Ndegeocello, Cookie the Anthropological Mixtape (Maverick, 2002)
- Dapp Theory, Layers of Chance (Contrology/ObliqSound, 2008)
- Garaj Mahal, More Mr. Nice Guy (Owl, 2010)
- Miles Okazaki, Trickster (Pi, 2016)
- Miles Okazaki, The Sky Below (Pi, 2019)
- Miles Okazaki, Thisness (Pi, 2022)
- Miles Okazaki, Live In Brooklyn (Cygnus, 2023)
- Cautious Clay, Karpeh (Blue Note, 2023)

== Videography ==
- 2002: Sean Rickman – Compositional Drumming DVD/CD Set
- 1992: Shawn Lane – Power Licks (REH Video)
- 1992: Shawn Lane – Power Solos (REH Video)
