= Powers of Ten; Live! =

Live album by Shawn Lane
- Released: 2001
- Recorded: November 19, 1992 at New Daisy Theatre in Memphis, Tennessee; February 5, 1993 at Musicians Institute in Hollywood; February 12, 1993 at Ventura Theatre in Ventura, California
- Genre: Instrumental rock, jazz fusion
- Length: 73:43
- Label: Eye Reckon
- Producer: Shawn Lane, Les Birchfield

Shawn Lane chronology
The Tri-Tone Fascination (1999)	Powers of Ten; Live! (2001)

Professional ratings
Review scores
Source	Rating
AllMusic	2.5/5 stars

Powers of Ten; Live! is a live album by guitarist Shawn Lane, released in 2001 through Eye Reckon Records. This was to be Lane's final solo effort, before his death in 2003.

== Track listing ==
All music is composed by Shawn Lane, except where noted.

No.	Title	Length
1.	"Introduction (I Think You Know Why You're Here?)"	0:07
2.	"Esperanto"	3:46
3.	"Gray Pianos Flying"	3:09
4.	"Black Market" (Joe Zawinul)	8:54
5.	"West Side Boogie" (Ray Gomez)	5:51
6.	"Epilogue for Lisa"	3:06
7.	"Illusions"	4:19
8.	"Get You Back"	7:11
9.	"Not Again"	5:23
10.	"Drum & Guitar Solo"	4:27
11.	"Tri-Heaven"	4:04
12.	"Hardcase" (Lane, John Eatman)	9:01
13.	"Drum Solo I"	1:02
14.	"Drum Solo II"	1:48
15.	"Tri 7/5"	6:43
16.	"Introduction of Musicians"	0:28
Total length:		73:43

Japanese edition bonus track
No.	Title	Length
17.	"Rules of the Game"	4:24

== Personnel ==
- Shawn Lane – guitar, production
- Doug Scarborough – keyboard
- Sean Rickman – drums
- Barry Bays – bass
- Todd Bobo – saxophone
- Bruce Dees – digital editing
- Michael Patterson – digital editing
- Denny Purcell – mastering
- Les Birchfield – executive production
