= Richard Hallebeek =

Dutch musician

Richard Hallebeek (born August 2, 1974 in Bilthoven) is a Dutch jazz fusion guitarist.

== Discography ==
Title	Release	Remarks
Generator	1994	Co-production with Finnish guitarist Antti Kotikoski
Nostalgia	1997	Richard Hallebeek performs on guitar on René Engel's album
Spheres Of Samarkand	1998	Richard Hallebeek performs on guitar on René Engel's album
No Respect In '98	1998	Co-production with Finnish guitarist Antti Kotikoski
Leftovers, outtakes & mistakes	2000	-
Richard Hallebeek Project	2004	Featuring Lale Larson, Bas Cornelissen Feat, Shawn Lane, and Brett Garsed
Flowriders-Pheromone	2005	Richard Hallebeek performs on guitar on the EP of the Flowriders

Further contributions of Richard Hallebeek on the albums The Alchemists (track nr 5), Perception Of The Beholder from Isotope, and Attitude from Salvatore Vecchio & Simone Damiani. 2013: Richard Hallebeek Project II: Pain in the Jazz
