= Time Is the Enemy =

Live album by Jonas Hellborg
- Released: 14 October 1997
- Recorded: 1996 in various countries and continents
- Genre: Jazz fusion
- Length: 52:50
- Label: Bardo
- Producer: Jonas Hellborg

Jonas Hellborg chronology
Temporal Analogues of Paradise (1996)	Time Is the Enemy (1997)	Zenhouse (1999)

Alternative cover
- 2004 remastered edition

Time Is the Enemy is a live album by bassist Jonas Hellborg, released on 14 October 1997 through Bardo Records; a remastered edition was reissued on 30 March 2004. It features guitarist Shawn Lane and drummer Jeff Sipe (credited as Apt. Q-258) as collaborators, both of whom joined Hellborg on his previous album Temporal Analogues of Paradise (1996).

== Critical reception ==
Professional ratings
Review scores
Source	Rating
All About Jazz	Favourable
AllMusic	4/5 stars

C. Michael Bailey at All About Jazz gave Time Is the Enemy a positive review, calling it "virtuosic" and "totally improvised and totally honest", whilst saying that the trio of Hellborg, Lane and Sipe were "making fusion fun and interesting again." Michael G. Nastos at AllMusic gave the album four stars out of five, also remarking that the trio was "pumping some stark vitality" into jazz fusion.

== Track listing ==
All music is composed by Jonas Hellborg and Shawn Lane.

No.	Title	Length
1.	"Heretics"	9:13
2.	"Wherever You Walk"	9:48
3.	"Space Time Continuum"	9:53
4.	"The Kings Letter"	6:37
5.	"Barua a Soldani"	10:25
6.	"Time Is the Enemy"	6:54
Total length:		52:50

== Personnel ==
- Jonas Hellborg – bass, production
- Shawn Lane – guitar
- Jeff Sipe – drums
- Scud Noonan – mixing
