= Zenhouse =

Live album by Jonas Hellborg, Shawn Lane and Jeff Sipe
- Released: 9 November 1999
- Recorded: RagnarPers in Gärsnäs
- Genre: Jazz fusion, instrumental, acoustic
- Length: 54:05
- Label: Bardo
- Producer: Jonas Hellborg

Jonas Hellborg and Shawn Lane chronology
Time Is the Enemy (1997)	Zenhouse (1999)	Good People in Times of Evil (2000)

Zenhouse is the fourth collaborative live album by bassist Jonas Hellborg and guitarist Shawn Lane, released on 9 November 1999 through Bardo Records. For this line-up, they are joined for the third time by drummer Jeff Sipe. In contrast to the previous high-energy jazz fusion/rock releases by the trio, this album is performed unplugged.

== Critical reception ==
Professional ratings
Review scores
Source	Rating
AllMusic	4/5 stars

Michael G. Nastos of AllMusic gave Zenhouse four stars of five, describing the music as "displaying a characteristic effortless flow, patience, and virtue closely associated with the music of Ravi Shankar, Oregon, or Shakti", whilst suggesting to casual listeners that "those expecting and wanting only the rock loudness these three have displayed before, however, will be disappointed."

== Track listing ==
All music is composed by Jonas Hellborg, Shawn Lane and Jeff Sipe.

No.	Title	Length
1.	"In the House"	13:00
2.	"Outdoors"	17:08
3.	"Departure"	13:44
4.	"Conclusion"	10:13
Total length:		54:05

== Personnel ==
- Jonas Hellborg – bass, production
- Shawn Lane – scat singing, guitar
- Jeff Sipe – snare drum, bongo drum, cymbals, bells
