= Personae (album) =

Live album by Jonas Hellborg
- Released: 26 February 2002
- Recorded: 1996 in Mainz
- Genre: Jazz fusion
- Length: 56:58
- Label: Bardo
- Producer: Jonas Hellborg

Jonas Hellborg and Shawn Lane chronology
Good People in Times of Evil (2000)	Personae (2002)	Icon: A Transcontinental Gathering (2003)

Personae is a live album by bassist Jonas Hellborg, released on 26 February 2002 through Bardo Records. The album continues the series of live recordings by the trio of Hellborg, guitarist Shawn Lane, and drummer Jeff Sipe.

== Critical reception ==
Professional ratings
Review scores
Source	Rating
All About Jazz	(favourable)
All About Jazz (2)	(favourable)
AllMusic	4.5/5 stars
American Reporter	(favourable)

Marked by individual technical virtuosity and collective harmony of expression, the album escorts the listener through a variety of styles, including rock and funk music, in which "the key ingredient is listening to others" "building on it, extending it, taking it someplace new before handing it back". It is this multifaceted process of personal and collective musical communication that explains the title of Personae.

== Track listing ==
All music is composed by Jonas Hellborg and Shawn Lane.

No.	Title	Length
1.	"Time Is the Enemy"	4:41
2.	"Rag B/B"	20:10
3.	"Personae"	7:20
4.	"Heretics"	11:25
5.	"Hell Is Other People"	8:01
6.	"Rice with the Angels"	5:21
Total length:		56:58

== Personnel ==
- Jonas Hellborg – bass, production
- Shawn Lane – guitar
- Jeff Sipe – drums
- Scud Noonan – mixing
