= Powers of Ten (album) =

Studio album by Shawn Lane
- Released: 1992
- Studios: Apogee Studio, Memphis, Tennessee
- Genres: Instrumental rock, jazz fusion
- Length: 60:16
- Label: Warner Bros.
- Producer: Shawn Lane

Shawn Lane chronology
Powers of Ten (1992)	The Tri-Tone Fascination (1999)

Powers of Ten is the first studio album by guitarist Shawn Lane, released in 1992 through Warner Bros. Records. A second edition was reissued in 1993, with a revised track listing and alternate versions of "Get You Back" and "West Side Boogie" (both of which were included as bonus tracks on the 2006 reissue through Eye Reckon Records). In a 2009 article by Guitar World magazine, Powers of Ten was ranked seventh on the all-time top ten list of shred albums.

== Critical reception ==
Professional ratings
Review scores
Source	Rating
AllMusic	2/5 stars

Jas Obrecht at Guitar Player praised Powers of Ten as "a solo album in the truest sense. ... The immaculate articulations of 'Gray Pianos Flying' will awe shred-heads, while 'Epilogue (for Lisa)' ... displays the guitarist's more tender side."

Daniel Gioffre at AllMusic called the album "uneven and frustrating". Among his criticisms were the lack of a full band (Lane performed all the instruments himself on most tracks), the "egregious misstep" of using programmed drums, and the "long and meandering" keyboard pieces "Powers of Ten: Suite" and "Piano Concertino: Transformation of Themes"; the latter tracks he noted as interrupting the momentum established in the album's first half. He nonetheless called most of the songs "pleasant enough" and praised Lane as a "phenomenally talented" guitarist and musician.

== Track listing ==
All music is composed by Shawn Lane, except where noted.

No.	Title	Length
1.	"Not Again"	3:53
2.	"Illusions"	4:19
3.	"Get You Back"	4:57
4.	"West Side Boogie" (Ray Gomez)	5:31
5.	"Powers of Ten: Suite"	13:05
6.	"Piano Concertino: Transformation of Themes"	9:07
7.	"Paris"	5:47
8.	"Esperanto"	3:39
9.	"Rules of the Game"	3:59
10.	"Gray Pianos Flying"	3:10
11.	"Epilogue (For Lisa)"	2:49
Total length:		60:16

1993 Reissue
No.	Title	Length
1.	"Get You Back"	4:41
2.	"West Side Boogie" (Ray Gomez)	3:44
3.	"Not Again"	3:54
4.	"Esperanto"	3:45
5.	"Illusions"	4:16
6.	"Piano Concertino: Transformation of Themes"	9:04
7.	"Powers of Ten: Suite"	13:02
8.	"Paris"	5:46
9.	"Rules of the Game"	3:58
10.	"Gray Pianos Flying"	3:08
11.	"Epilogue (for Lisa)"	2:45
Total length:		57:03

2006 reissue bonus tracks
No.	Title	Length
12.	"Tri-Heaven"	3:52
13.	"Get You Back" (alternate version)	4:42
14.	"West Side Boogie" (alternate version)	4:40
Total length:		73:30

== Personnel ==
- Shawn Lane – guitar, keyboard, drum programming (except tracks 13, 14), bass (except tracks 13, 14), arrangement, engineering, mixing, production
- Sean Rickman – drums (tracks 13, 14)
- Barry Bays – bass (tracks 13, 14)
- Bil VornDick – mixing (tracks 2, 4, 8, 11)
- Linel – mixing assistance
- Andy Johns – engineering (tracks 12–14), mixing (tracks 12–14), production (tracks 13, 14)
- Richard Landers – engineering assistance (tracks 12–14), mixing assistance (tracks 12–14)
- Rail Rogut – engineering, mixing, digital editing (tracks 12–14)
- Bruce Dees – digital editing (tracks 1–11)
- Michael Patterson – digital editing (tracks 1–11)
- Denny Purcell – mastering (tracks 1–11)
- Bernie Grundman – mastering (tracks 12–14)
