= Good People in Times of Evil =

Live album by Jonas Hellborg, Shawn Lane and V. Selvaganesh
- Released: 10 November 2000
- Recorded: Early 2000 in Spoleto
- Genre: World fusion
- Length: 51:40
- Label: Bardo
- Producer: Jonas Hellborg

Jonas Hellborg and Shawn Lane chronology
Zenhouse (1999)	Good People in Times of Evil (2000)	Personae (2002)

Good People in Times of Evil is the fifth collaborative live album by bassist Jonas Hellborg and guitarist Shawn Lane, released on 10 November 2000 through Bardo Records. For this line-up they are joined by percussionist V. Selvaganesh, and as such it is the first album by Hellborg and Lane to incorporate Indian music.

== Critical reception ==
Professional ratings
Review scores
Source	Rating
AllMusic	4.5/5 stars

Rick Anderson of AllMusic gave Good People in Times of Evil 4.5 stars out of five, recommending it highly. He called it "beautiful in a way that challenges the ear" and "perhaps the most consistently lovely" of Hellborg's albums, whilst noting "Aga of the Ladies" and "Bhakti Ras" as highlights. He also praised the contributions of Selvaganesh and Lane, describing the latter as a "truly awe-inspiring" guitarist.

== Track listing ==
All tracks are written by Jonas Hellborg, except where noted.

No.	Title	Length
1.	"Aga of the Ladies"	12:10
2.	"Savitri"	6:53
3.	"Leal Souvenir"	10:55
4.	"Bhakti Ras" (Hellborg, Ustad Sultan Khan)	7:37
5.	"Who Would You Like to Be?" (Hellborg, V. Selvaganesh)	7:08
6.	"Uma Haimavati" (Hellborg, Selvaganesh)	6:57
Total length:		51:40

== Personnel ==
- Jonas Hellborg – bass guitar, production
- Shawn Lane – guitar
- V. Selvaganesh – vocals, kanjira, udu
- Ustad Sultan Khan – sarangi
