= Shawn Lane =

American musician (1963–2003)

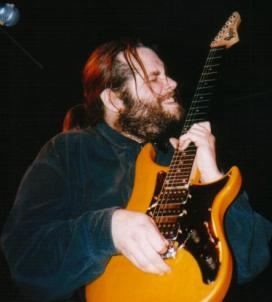

Background information
- Born: March 21, 1963; Memphis, Tennessee, U.S.
- Died: September 26, 2003 (aged 40) Memphis, Tennessee
- Genres: Instrumental rock; jazz fusion; world fusion
- Occupations: Musician; composer; producer
- Instruments: Guitar; piano; keyboard; bass
- Years active: 1977–2003
- Labels: Warner Bros.; Eye Reckon
- Formerly of: Jonas Hellborg/Jeff Sipe; Black Oak Arkansas; Savage Innocence; D.D.T.; The Willys; The Streets
- Website: shawnlane.com

Shawn Lane (March 21, 1963 – September 26, 2003) was an American musician who released two studio albums and collaborated with a variety of musicians including Ringo Starr, Kris Kristofferson, Johnny Cash, Willie Nelson, Waylon Jennings, Reggie Young, Joe Walsh, Jonas Hellborg, Anders Johansson, Jens Johansson and many others. After studying the piano, he learned to play the guitar, which he played with exceptional speed.

== Early life ==
Born in Memphis, Tennessee, Lane began playing piano with his sisters at the age of eight, but did not play guitar seriously until he was ten. At age 12–13, he began to practice heavily. At fourteen, he became the lead guitarist for Black Oak Arkansas (BOA), and alongside members including drummer Tommy Aldridge, toured over the next four years opening shows for bands including REO Speedwagon, Ted Nugent, Outlaws, Cheap Trick, Molly Hatchet and Blue Öyster Cult. During 1979, Shawn played in The Streets, recording studio demos with Andy Tanas on bass, Chris Craig on drums and Jimmy Henderson on guitar.

At age fifteen, Lane saw Allan Holdsworth play guitar with the progressive band U.K., which inspired him to develop his own style of playing guitar. Lane also played in Savage Innocence with singer Jim "Dandy" Mangrum, keyboardist Billy Batte, drummer Chris Craig and bassist Kinley Wolfe who then played with The Cult. As the original members dropped out, Lane replaced them with players from his high school days. Lane began to play a style close to jazz fusion. During the 1980s and early 1990s, Lane played in The Willys, a band consisting of singer/keyboardist Sam Bryant, singer/bassist Rob Caudill and his brother, drummer Russ Caudill. The Caudill brothers had played in The Breaks with Susanne Jerome-Taylor. Lane also performed in the fusion band Out of Bounds, with Barry Bays and DeGarmo and Key drummer Chuck Reynolds.

== Adulthood and piano ==
From age eighteen to twenty-six, Lane studied music, composed music, and played piano. In 1983, he became a father to a daughter named Ashley. Much of the material on Lane's first studio album, Powers of Ten, was written on his home piano. He quickly developed his technique on the keyboard as well, taking influence from pianists such as Franz Liszt, Art Tatum and Georges Cziffra.

His demo tapes led Shawn to be sought out by Jim Ed Norman and a recording contract with Warner Bros. Records. Except for one cover song, Lane wrote all the material and played all the instruments on his debut album. The album sold well and earned several magazine awards. Following its release in 1992, Guitar Player magazine named him "Best New Talent" and Keyboard Magazine placed him second in the "Best Keyboard Player" category. During the production of the album, Lane continued to play live shows and do session work. On September 19, 1992, Lane played in Guitar Player Magazine's 25th anniversary concert at Warfield Theatre, San Francisco alongside Steve Morse, John Lee Hooker, Dick Dale, Jeff "Skunk" Baxter, Adrian Belew, Ry Cooder and others. He also performed on the Mark Varney Project's Centrifugal Funk album along with Brett Garsed, Frank Gambale, Jimmy Earl, T. J. Helmerich. To promote his album, he formed The Powers of Ten band with Barry Bays on bass, keyboardist Doug Scarborough, Todd Bobo on saxophone and drummer Sean Rickman; they opened for Robben Ford's US tour.

Lane released two more solo albums following his debut, Powers of Ten; Live!, recorded live in 1993, and The Tri-Tone Fascination in 1999.

== Collaborations ==
During 1994, Lane met bassist Jonas Hellborg. Lane and Hellborg played with drummer Jeff Sipe in Hellborg, Lane, Sipe. Between 1994 and 1995, Lane played with D.D.T., a band consisting of Paul Taylor, Luther Dickinson, and Cody Dickinson; the latter three then formed the North Mississippi Allstars. Lane developed curricula and taught at several European conservatories, including the American Institute of Music in Vienna with Joey Tafolla and Milan Polak. He also wrote columns for Young Guitar Magazine in Japan which were published between February 1995 and 1996. During 1996, he also wrote columns for Guitar for the Practicing Musician in their Over-the-Top series. He engineered and co-produced the album Red Reign by Steven Patrick of Holy Soldier.

In September 1995, Hellborg, Lane, and drummer Anders Johansson played with Chinese pop singer Wei Wei and the trio appeared as an opening act at Chinese venues. Lane played the Warsaw Summer Jazz Days festival on June 19, 1998, with Hellborg and Félix Sabal Lecco. In 1998, he played the guitar solo on Bang a Drum featuring Jon Bon Jovi and Chris LeDoux, reaching number 68 on Hot Country Songs. During May 1999, he played with drummer Steve Ferrone at the Disma Music show, Rimini, Italy. Later, he and Hellborg formed an east–west fusion band with Indian musicians V. Selvaganesh and V. Umamahesh. On April 19, 2002, HLS opened for guitarist John Scofield at the Variety Playhouse, Atlanta. While in Memphis, Lane played with the Time Bandits, with singer Regina Parker, steel guitarist Tony Sutton, drummer Steve Sutton, and bassist Adam Sutton.

In February 2003, Lane and Hellborg toured India with drummer Andrea Marchesini, playing the Great Indian Rock Festival, Hamsadhwani Theatre, Pragati Maiden, New Delhi. Lane played the Swedish Jazz Celebration Festival, Stockholm, on March 29, 2003, with Hellborg, V. Umamahesh, V. Umashankar and Ramakrishnan. His last concert was at Smilefest in North Carolina with Hellborg and Jim Britt on May 31, 2003.

The Shawn Lane Memorial Concert was held on August 28, 2005, at the New Daisy Theatre in Memphis, Tennessee, celebrating the life and music of Shawn Lane with Andy Timmons, Jimi Jamison, Lord Tracy, Craig Erickson, Kevin Paige, Johnny Holiday, FreeWorld, and Jim "Dandy" Mangrum.

== Influences ==
Lane was influenced by many other artists but an important one was Pakistani musician Nusrat Fateh Ali Khan. Called "the King of Kings of Qawwali" and popular in Pakistan, India and Southern Asia, Khan fascinated Lane with his wide vocal range and the intertwining of his voice and the instrument. Lane was also a lover of great paintings and often spent free time on the road visiting museums. His favorite painter was Johannes Vermeer.

== Health and death ==
Lane had psoriasis throughout his life. From age twelve, he also suffered from psoriatic arthritis, which caused stiffness in his joints and after 2000 affected his ability to play guitar (Lane said that, with proper rest, he could still play live gigs). Lane treated his psoriasis with hydrocortisone for many years, which caused his weight to increase, further loading his joints. The use of hydrocortisone led to him developing Cushing's syndrome. Consequently, he backed off taking cortisone, but then the psoriasis would flare up, and he would need prescription painkillers to manage the unremitting pain. The symptoms of his condition, and the side effects of the medications, created a vicious circle. Complicating matters, for many years Lane did not have medical insurance coverage. In 2003, he started having difficulty breathing and was told that he would have to remain on medical oxygen for the rest of his life.

Lane died in a hospital in Memphis on September 26, 2003, of lung-related illnesses.

== Legacy ==
Although not a familiar name outside musicians' circles, guitar virtuosos such as Rusty Cooley, Michael Romeo, Alex Masi, Buckethead, Paul Gilbert – who called Lane "the most terrifying guy of all time" during a guitar clinic when asked about his thoughts on Lane's guitar playing skills – and many others regard Lane's work highly. In 2008, Guitar World magazine wrote, "Few, if any, guitarists can play faster than Lane could, and his arpeggio sweeps and precision-picked lines blasted more rapid-fire notes than the average human mind could comprehend."

== Discography ==
=== Solo albums ===
- 1992: "West Side Boogie" (promotional single)
- 1992: Powers of Ten (Warner Bros.)
- 1999: The Tri-Tone Fascination (Eye Reckon)
- 2001: Powers of Ten; Live! (Eye Reckon)
- 2019: The Tri-Tone Fascination (20th Anniversary Edition) (Shawn Lane / Shawn Lane Estate Memphis)
- 2021: Powers of Ten; Live!(20th Anniversary Edition) (Shawn Lane)

=== Instructional video ===
- Shawn Lane – Power Licks – REH837, 1993, (VHS)
- Shawn Lane – Power Solos – REH838, 1993, (VHS)
- Shawn Lane – Power Licks & Solos, 1995, Warner Brother Publications

=== With Jonas Hellborg ===
- 1995: Abstract Logic (Bardo)
- 1995: Two Doors with Michael Shrieve (CMP)
- 1996: Temporal Analogues of Paradise (Bardo)
- 1997: Time Is the Enemy (Bardo)
- 1999: Zenhouse (Bardo)
- 2000: Good People in Times of Evil (Bardo)
- 2002: Personae (Bardo)
- 2003: Icon: A Transcontinental Gathering (Bardo)
- 2004: Paris: DVD release of the 2001 concert at New Morning (Bardo)

=== Other appearances ===
- 1983: Tender Mercies – Music from the Motion Picture (Liberty)
- 1984: U.S. Metal Vol. IV – Unsung Guitar Heroes, Stratosphere II, (Shrapnel)
- 1989: Looking for Shelter, Michael Bradley & Mark Lindsay
- 1990: Highwayman 2 – The Highwaymen, (Columbia Nashville)
- 1990: Son of the South – Toy Caldwell, (Blue Hat)
- 1991: Worrall – Rick & Steve Worrall with Jimi Jamison, (A&M)
- 1991: Centrifugal Funk with Frank Gambale Brett Garsed (Legato)
- 1991: When Love Comes Down, Jimi Jamison (Scotti Bros.)
- 1992: Guitar on the Edge, Vol 1, No. 1 (Legato)
- 1992: Guitar on the Edge, Vol 1, No. 2 with David Ormonde Thomas,(Legato)
- 1992: On the Way Home, David Ormonde Thomas (Ethereal Thunde)
- 1993: A Little on the CD Side, Vol. 7, Musician magazine
- 1994: Guitar's Practicing Musicians Vol 111 (Guitar Recordings)
- 1995: Red Reign, Steven Patrick, (Emerald Stare)
- 1996: Guitar Zone, (CMP)
- 1996: Exploring the Frontiers of Rock, Jazz and World Music, (CMP)
- 1996: New Spirits in Jazz – Part 2, (EFA)
- 1997: Breaking the Barriers of Jazz, (Silva Screen)
- 1997: Fission, Jens Johansson, with Mike Stern (Heptagon)
- 1997: Calvin Russell, Calvin Russell (Last Call)
- 1998: One Road Man, Chris LeDoux, (Capitol Nashville)
- 1998: Fission, Jens Johansson, Japanese bonus track Straffpolska Fran Sudan (Pony Canyon)
- 1999: Parker Card & The Sideman Syndicate, Parker Card, with Eric Gales (Orchard)
- 1999: Rock Guitarists Forever Best, Various Artists compilation, Japanese-only release
- 2000: Mood Du Jour, Doug Scarborough, (Hapi Skratch)
- 2000: The Highwayman Collection, The Highwaymen (Sony) CMG
- 2003: Polaris, North Mississippi Allstars (ATO)
- 2004: Richard Hallebeek Project, Richard Hallebeek, with Brett Garsed (Liquid Note)
- 2008: Classic Chris LeDoux (Capitol Nashville)
- 2009: The World's Greatest Fusion Guitarists, (Tone Center)
- 2009: Ain't Over Ain't Through, Larry Raspberry and the Highsteppers, (Larry Raspberry / Intense Records and Music)
- 2011: Worrall – Rick & Steve Worrall with Jimi Jamison (A&M), re-release on (Yesterrock)
- 2013: Parker Card & The Sidemen Syndicate, Remastered (Wild Card)
- 2014: Richard Hallebeek Project, Richard Hallebeek, Remastered with bonus track External Mess (Richie Rich)
- 2019: Underdog Heroes, Black Oak Arkansas, Purple Pyramid

=== Tribute ===
- 2004: Shawn Lane Remembered Vol 1, Lion
- 2004: Shawn Lane Remembered Vol 2, Lion Music
- 2004: The Usual Unusual, J.A.M., (Liquid Note)
- 2004: Concert in Shillong - Live in India, Andrea Marshesini (Big Gear)
- 2005: A Tribute to Frank Marino - Secondhand Smoke, (Wildmess)
- 2005: Tribute, Eric Mantel, The Unstruck Melody, (Holistic Music BMI)
- 2007: Dedication, Whoopgnash, Lack of Education, Independent
- 2007: Homage to Shawn Lane, Victor Lafuente, Six Strings for One Heart, (Ear–volution)
- 2008: Slendro: and Improv for Lane, The Fractured Dimension – Towards the Mysterium, The Fractured Dimension
- 2010: Power Lane, Magnus Olsson, Melodic Soloists (Mad Guitar)
- 2011: One Day in Heaven, Mistheria, Keys of Eternity, Sifare Music Publishing
- 2015: The Spirit of Shawn, Frankenstein Rooster, The Nerdvrotic Sounds' Escape, Scarlet
- 2015: Temporal Landrons, Suhy, Silvergold & Alvarado, Tessellations, Suhy, Silvergold & Alvarado
