= Art Metal (band) =

Swedish band

- Origin: Sweden
- Genres: Progressive metal, art rock, jazz fusion
- Years active: 2007–present
- Label: Bardo Records
- Members: Mattias Eklundh; Jens Johansson; V. Selvaganesh; Jonas Hellborg; Anders Johansson; Zoltan Csörsz Jr.
- Website: http://www.hellborggroup.com/

Art Metal is a progressive metal band based in Sweden and led by Jonas Hellborg. Some of their line-ups have included guitarist Mattias Eklundh of Freak Kitchen fame, the Johansson brothers who have both contributed to the solo career of Yngwie Malmsteen, and Jonas Hellborg, an influential musician and solo artist in the jazz music scene. The band's music also has plenty of Indian music influence.

Mattias Eklundh and Jonas Hellborg made the cover of the Swedish Fuzz Magazine in support of Art Metal.

== Discography ==
- Art Metal (full-length, 18 September 2007)
- Jazz Raj (full-length, 2014)

== Line-up ==
- Jonas Hellborg – bass
- Mattias IA Eklundh – guitar
- V. Selvaganesh – kanjira (1st album except on Vyakhyan Kar)
- Jens Johansson – keyboards (1st album)
- Ranjit Barot – drums on Jazz Raj
- Anders Johansson – drums (1st album)
- Zoltan Csörsz Jr. - drums
