= Octave of the Holy Innocents =

Studio album by Jonas Hellborg with Buckethead and Michael Shrieve
- Released: 1993
- Studios: Greenpoint Studio, Brooklyn, New York
- Genres: Jazz, experimental rock
- Length: 42:49
- Labels: Day Eight Music; DEM 032
- Producer: Jonas Hellborg

Reissue Cover

Octave of the Holy Innocents is an album by bassist Jonas Hellborg on which he is joined by guitarist Buckethead and drummer Michael Shrieve. It was recorded at Greenpoint Studio in Brooklyn, New York, and was released by the Swedish label Day Eight Music in 1993. Hellborg later reworked the album and reissued it on his Bardo Records label.

Regarding his association with Buckethead, Hellborg stated that he "was always playing electric on everything he was doing. It was interesting to see what he could do with acoustic guitar. I like the record and what he did. It's sort of minimalist in a sense. It's definitely a clear musical statement and makes sense to me."

In the album liner notes, Hellborg asked: "Who is pure? Who is innocent? We need to protect innocence. Not only individuals' rights to be innocent but also innocence as a source of beauty, creativity and wisdom."

== Reception ==
Professional ratings
Review scores
Source	Rating
AllMusic	4.5/5 stars
The Virgin Encyclopedia of Jazz	3/5 stars
The Encyclopedia of Popular Music	3/5 stars

In a review for AllMusic, Glenn Astarita wrote: "there's no lack of excitement here, as this acoustic-based power trio generates quite a bit of momentum in concert with a few ethereally enacted dreamscapes... it's all about the sparkling chemistry that prevails throughout this wonderfully conceived and executed project! (Strongly recommended)."

Paul Acquaro of The Free Jazz Collective called the album "dark and lugubriously melodic," and stated that it "rewired parts of [his] musical listening brain."

== Track listing ==
1. "Rana and Fara" – 15:00
2. "Death that Sleeps in Them" – 5:22
3. "The Past is a Different Country, I Don't Live There Anymore" – 9:14
4. "Child King" – 5:47
5. "Kidogo" – 7:13

== Credits ==
- Buckethead – acoustic guitar
- Jonas Hellborg – acoustic bass, keyboards
- Michael Shrieve – drums
