= Icon: A Transcontinental Gathering =

Studio album by Jonas Hellborg
- Released: 25 January 2003
- Recorded: Air Edel Studios in London, England; Bardo Studios in New York City; The Dungeon in Memphis, Tennessee
- Genre: Jazz fusion, world fusion
- Length: 59:19
- Label: Bardo
- Producer: Jonas Hellborg

Jonas Hellborg and Shawn Lane chronology
| Personae (2002) | Icon: A Transcontinental Gathering (2003) |

Professional ratings
Review scores
| Source | Rating |
|---|---|
| Allmusic | 4.5/5 stars |

Icon: A Transcontinental Gathering is an album by bassist Jonas Hellborg, released on 25 January 2003 through Bardo Records. The album merges contemporary jazz-fusion and traditional Indian improvised music and features guitarist Shawn Lane in his last officially released studio recording before his death in September of that year, as well as the sons of ghatam player Vikku Vinayakram: Selvaganesh (kanjeera), Umashankar (ghatam) and Umamamesh (vocals), who also perform passages of konnakol, the vocal "scatting" often used as a memory device by Indian percussionists. The album's name stands for a common cross-cultural ideal image, beyond vanity and self-identity, also present in this kind of musical communication.

== Track listing ==
All tracks are written by Jonas Hellborg and V. Selvaganesh.

| No. | Title | Length |
|---|---|---|
| 1. | "Anchor" | 15:02 |
| 2. | "Mirror" | 23:20 |
| 3. | "Vehicle" | 16:11 |
| 4. | "Escape" | 4:46 |
| Total length: | | 59:19 |

== Personnel ==
- Jonas Hellborg – bass, production
- Shawn Lane – guitar
- V. Umamahesh – vocals
- V. Selvaganesh – konnakol, kanjira
- V. Umashankar – konnakol, ghatam
