= Abstract Logic (album) =

Live album by Jonas Hellborg, Shawn Lane and Kofi Baker
- Released: 1995
- Recorded: December 1994 at RagnarPers in Gärsnäs
- Genre: Jazz fusion
- Length: 46:54
- Label: Day Eight
- Producer: Jonas Hellborg

Jonas Hellborg and Shawn Lane chronology
Abstract Logic (1995)	Temporal Analogues of Paradise (1996)

Alternative cover
- 2004 remastered edition

Abstract Logic is the first collaborative live album by bassist Jonas Hellborg and guitarist Shawn Lane, released in 1995 through Day Eight Music; a remastered and remixed edition, containing a revised track listing and two extra tracks, was reissued through Bardo Records in 2004. For this lineup, they are joined by drummer Kofi Baker.

== Critical reception ==
Professional ratings
Review scores
Source	Rating
Allmusic	4/5 stars

Robert Taylor at AllMusic gave Abstract Logic four stars out of five, calling it "a very good recording" but criticising Shawn Lane's guitar playing as inconsistent on the album. He praised Lane for sounding "positively demonic" and "demented, original and exciting" on some songs, but sounding too much like Allan Holdsworth on others.

== Track listing ==
All tracks are written by Jonas Hellborg, Shawn Lane and Kofi Baker, except where noted.

No.	Title	Length
1.	"Serpents and Pigs"	5:08
2.	"Rice with the Angels"	8:07
3.	"Pluie de Etincelles" (Lane)	4:05
4.	"Layla Attar" (Hellborg)	5:49
5.	"Abstract Logic" (Baker)	8:49
6.	"Put the Shoe on the Other Foot"	6:15
7.	"Throwing Elephant and Wrestling"	8:41
Total length:		46:54

=== 2004 remastered edition ===
No.	Title	Length
1.	"Serpents and Pigs"	5:08
2.	"Rice with the Angels"	8:07
3.	"Abstract Logic" (Baker)	8:49
4.	"A Handful of Earth"	4:35
5.	"Don't Look Back"	8:52
6.	"Throwing Elephant and Wrestling"	8:41
7.	"Pluie de Etincelles" (Lane)	4:05
8.	"Layla Attar" (Hellborg)	5:49
9.	"Put the Shoe on the Other Foot"	6:15
Total length:		60:21

== Personnel ==
- Jonas Hellborg – bass, production
- Shawn Lane – vocals, guitar, keyboard
- Kofi Baker – drums
- Stéphane Jean – engineering
- Tim Hunt – mixing
