= Art Metal (album) =

Studio album by Jonas Hellborg
- Released: 2007
- Recorded: at The Bunker, The Red House and at Aspoe Island
- Genre: Art rock, heavy metal, world music, jazz, rock, jazz fusion
- Length: 49:40
- Label: Bardo
- Producer: Jonas Hellborg

Jonas Hellborg chronology
Art Metal (2007)	Jazz Raj (2014)

Art Metal is an album by bass guitarist Jonas Hellborg, released in 2007 through Bardo Records. It is the debut recording by Hellborg's project of the same name, Art Metal, borrowing the aesthetic of contemporary metal expanded with Indian and jazz improvisational disciplines.

With longtime collaborator, South Indian percussion master V. Selvaganesh, the bass virtuoso explores this new path with three Swedish exponents of the modern metal scene, Jens Johansson (Yngwie Malmsteen, Dio, Stratovarius) and Anders Johansson (Yngwie Malmsteen and HammerFall) and, completing the ensemble, guitarist Mattias IA Eklundh. The music has been slowly brewed over 18 months to find the spaces where the elements of the seemingly disparate musical traditions can comfortably coexist, even gel into new forms of sonic art.

== Songs / tracks listing ==
All tracks are written by Jonas Hellborg

No.	Title	Length
1.	"Muthucutpor"	5:08
2.	"Manirambha"	5:48
3.	"Nataraja"	4:10
4.	"Solitude"	3:07
5.	"The Three Princes of Serendip"	11:18
6.	"Round Metal Hat"	4:44
7.	"Vyakhyan - kar"	5:58
8.	"Art Metal"	9:23

== Personnel ==
- Cover Art – Magnus Bergström
- Bass – Jonas Hellborg
- Drums – Anders Johansson
- Guitar – Mattias IA Eklundh
- Kanjira – Selvaganesh
- Keyboards – Jens Johansson
- Mixed By, Mastered By – Jens Johansson, Jonas Hellborg
- Producer – Jonas Hellborg
