= Aram of the Two Rivers =

Live album by Jonas Hellborg
- Released: 1999
- Recorded: September 1996
- Venue: Damascus, Aleppo
- Studio: Studio Aryanam
- Genre: World, jazz fusion
- Length: 58:59
- Label: Bardo
- Producer: Jonas Hellborg

Aram of the Two Rivers is an album by bass guitarist Jonas Hellborg that was released in 1999 by Bardo Records.

It was recorded live in Syria in 1996 at two venues: the Al Azam Palace in Damascus and one of the oldest caravanserais in Aleppo. Composed of six improvised suites, the album is a fusion of jazz and Arabic music, melding Hellborg's polyrhythms and Middle Eastern modal harmonic structures with authentic sounds of ethnic instruments played by local musicians.

Darbukas (Tarek Malas and Mahfouz Al Hosaini) and riqq (Nabil Khaiat) are assisting Hellborg's acoustic bass in its rhythmic and melodic drive, joined by ney player Mased Sri al Den on the first three tracks and violinist Hadi Backdonas on the last three. The result is a collection of intriguing, though pleasantly accessible, silence-breathing arrangements with virtuous melodic exchanges, unison played ideas and haunting (at times even dance-like) rhythms.

== Instruments ==
Jonas Hellborg plays here an acoustic bass, custom built by luthier Abraham Wechter, an exquisite work of art also to be heard on some of his other albums ("Silent Life", "Octave of the Holy Innocents").

In his hands, the instrument receives the versatility of a wider sounding, deeper range guitar, capable of appealing melodic runs, chordal approaches, but also of the thumb slapping, string pulling and popping one would expect from an electric bass.

"It makes me wonder if he's not some sort of demonic half-organic machine, performing myriad calculations before lifting a finger to play not quite the thing you expected." concludes Carl Glaser for Ink19 Music Reviews.

Darbuka is a hand-drum heard in the Middle East, North Africa and Eastern Europe, similar to a clay pot (it can also be made of metal or wood);

Riqq is a small percussion instrument similar to a tambourine used in traditional Arabic music, originally built as a wooden frame with jingles, covered with fish or goat skin;

Ney is a traditional Middle-Eastern end-blown flute, with a fluid, sensual and floating sound.

== Title etymology ==
"Aram of the Two Rivers" (original: "Aram-Naharaim") designates a Syrian region better known today as Mesopotamia, ancient home of the Arameans and primordial cradle of human culture and civilization, stretching between the two rivers Tigris and Euphrates, and referenced as far back as the Old Testament.

== Songs / tracks listing ==
All tracks are written by Jonas Hellborg

No.	Title	Length
1.	"Aram of Damascus"	9:32
2.	"Sham"	7:57
3.	"Akkadia"	11:58
4.	"Aram of Zoba"	9:14
5.	"Salah Al Din"	9:47
6.	"Suriya"	6:02

== Personnel ==
- Jonas Hellborg – bass guitar, producer
- Mased Sri Al Deen – flute (ney)
- Hadi Backdonas – violin
- Nabil Khaiat – tambourine (riq)
- Mahfouz Al Hosaini – goblet drum
- Tarek Malas – goblet drum
