= Mattias Eklundh =

Swedish guitarist (born 1969)

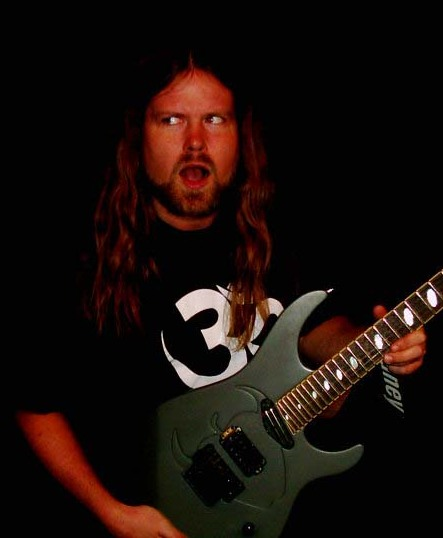
- Eklundh in 2006

Background information
- Also known as: IA
- Born: 6 October 1969 (age 56); Gothenburg, Sweden
- Genres: Progressive metal, experimental, heavy metal, speed metal, power metal, hard rock
- Occupations: Musician, producer, songwriter
- Instruments: Guitar, vocals
- Years active: 1985–present
- Labels: Favored Nations, Thunderstruck
- Member of: Art Metal, Freak Kitchen, Freak Guitar
- Formerly of: Fate, Frozen Eyes
- Website: freakguitar.com

Mattias Bernt Johannes Eklundh (born 6 October 1969), also known as IA, is a Swedish guitarist and vocalist. He is known for his work with Freak Kitchen, Jonas Hellborg and Art Metal, and he has also produced several noted solo Freak Guitar albums released by Steve Vai and Favored Nations, and holds his annual Freak Guitar Camp in the woods of Sweden every summer for dedicated guitar players from all over the world. He was also prominently featured playing his trademark-style solos on the first four Soilwork albums.

== Biography ==
Eklundh began drumming at the age of six; when he was thirteen, he began playing guitar. He has named Frank Zappa and Ace Frehley of Kiss as his two major musical influences, but his record collection also included gypsy jazz, Miles Davis, and Slayer among many others.

In the mid-80's, Eklundh joined the band Frozen Eyes, a few years later he quit because their manager was holding their money, and they never had a good share of it, until Eklundh did the math. Frozen Eyes split up soon after their self-titled album was released in 1988 and Eklundh subsequently joined Danish metal band Fate as lead guitarist. Eklundh appears on their 1990 album Scratch 'n Sniff. He later returned to Sweden, forming his own band Freak Kitchen in 1992 with former Frozen Eyes drummer Joakim Sjöberg and bassplayer Christian Grönlund. The band played together for eight years, until Sjöberg and Grönlund left in 2000, only to be replaced by Christer Örtefors and Björn Fryklund.

Outside of Freak Kitchen, Eklundh has recorded several solo albums, and made appearances as a guest musician for Swedish heavy metal bands like Evergrey and Soilwork. His two Freak Guitar solo albums are released on Steve Vai's Favored Nations label, and include drawings and other artwork by friend Anders Nyberg. In 2005, he grouped with Swedish bass guitarist and composer Jonas Hellborg in the Jonas Hellborg Trio along with drummer Niclas Campagnol and played their first gig in Mumbai, India and followed with a tour of India. His album, Freak Guitar – The Road Less Traveled, features a rock- and metal-like remix of not title theme, but the background theme from the 1985 film Fletch.

In 2006, Eklundh's song "Zoo Me", was contributed to the album project Artists for Charity – Guitarists 4 the Kids, produced by Slang Productions, to assist World Vision Canada in helping underprivileged kids in need.

He also annually hosts and teaches at the Freak Guitar Camp.

Eklundh does not smoke and is a vegetarian. He lives in Härryda with his family, two dogs and a cat.

== Equipment ==
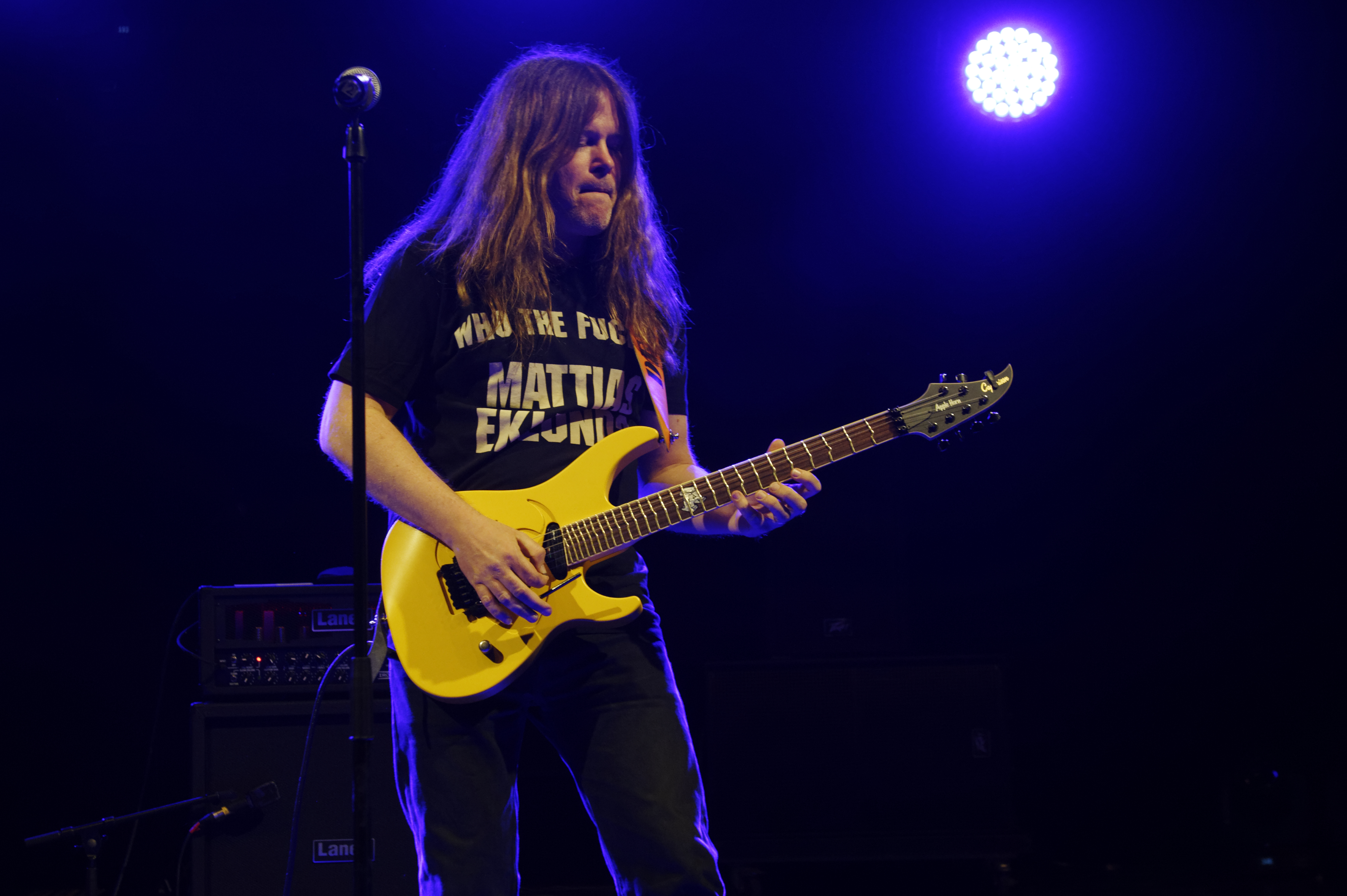
Eklundh performing in 2013

Eklundh played Caparison Guitars from 1996 to 2024 and had a long standing signature guitar model called "Apple Horn". In 2015 saw the release of an eight-string model "Apple Horn 8" bearing a factory set low E. Eklundh uses the True Temperament fret system on his guitars. In March 2024 it was announced that Eklundh and True Temperament have collaborated on a new guitar brand called Freak Guitar Lab, manufactured at True Temperament's factory in Trollhättan, Sweden. Six, seven and eight-string "Ulv" models are currently available.

Eklundh exclusively uses Laney Ironheart amplifiers and cabinets. His signal chain includes Dunlop volume pedal before the amp and MXR Carbon Copy delay pedal in the amp's effects loop. Eklundh also uses Line 6 Helix guitar processors both standalone and with his Laney amps.

Eklundh also endorses Toontrack products and has provided digital guitar amp and cabinet simulations for the "Metal Guitar Gods" expansion pack. He also uses EZdrummer for the drum tracks of his Freak Guitar project.

== Discography ==
=== Solo ===
- Sensually Primitive (1996) – as Mr. Libido
- Freak Guitar (1999)
- Freak Guitar: The Road Less Traveled (2005)
- Freak Guitar: The Smorgasbord (2013)

=== With Freak Kitchen ===
- Appetizer (1994)
- Raw (1994)
- Spanking Hour (1996)
- Junk Tooth EP (1997)
- Freak Kitchen (1998)
- Dead Soul Men (2000)
- Move (2002)
- Organic (2005)
- Land of the Freaks (2009)
- Cooking with Pagans (2014)
- Confusion to the Enemy (2018)
- Everyone Gets Bloody (2024)

=== Other ===
- Frozen Eyes – The Metal Collection III (1987)
- Frozen Eyes – Frozen Eyes (1988)
- Fate – Scratch 'n' Sniff (1990)
- Road Ratt – Road Ratt (1992)
- Is this tough or what? – Compilation (1992)
- Pagan – The Weight (1993)
- Triple & Touch – T & T (1993)
- Tornado Soup – Tornado Soup (1994)
- Hans Lindell – En del av bilden (1996)
- Sven Olander – Air Blue (1997)
- Locomotive Breath (1997)
- Hans Sahlin – Hans Sahlin (1997) (Unreleased)
- Evergrey – The Dark Discovery (1998)
- Torben Schmidt (1998) (Unreleased)
- Janne Lucas (1998) (Unreleased)
- Soilwork – Steelbath Suicide (1998)
- Soilwork – The Chainheart Machine (1999) song – "Machinegun Majesty"
- Guitar Oddysey – A tribute to Yngwie Malmsteen (1999)
- Soilwork – A Predator's Portrait (2001) song – "Needlefeast"
- Warmth in the Wilderness – A tribute to Jason Becker (2001)
- Bumblefoot – 9.11 (2001)
- Plug In (2001) (Unreleased)
- Mister Kite – All in Time (2002)
- Locomotive Breath – Heavy Machinery (2002)
- Soilwork – Natural Born Chaos (2002) song – "No More Angels"
- Johan Randen – Lead Guitar (2002)
- Audiovision – The Calling (2005)
- United – DVD (2005)
- Petrus – Come What Might (2005)
- Martin Motnik with Gregg Bissonette – Bass Invader (2005) songs – "YYZ" and "Bee on Speed"
- Artists for Charity – Guitarists 4 the Kids (2006) song – "Zoo Me"
- Art Metal – Art Metal (2007)
- Mr. Fastfinger – The Way of the Exploding Guitar (2009)
- Chris Catena – Discovery (2009)
- Destrage – Jade's Place (2010)
- Stephan Forte – The Shadows Compendium – Song – "De Praestigiis Daemonum" (2012)
- Panzerballet – Tank Goodness – Song – "The Ikea Trauma" (2012)
- Art Metal – Jazz Raj (2014)
- Technopath – Sudden Enlightenment (2017)

==== Instructional Videos ====
- Freak Guitar Vol 1 (1995) (VHS)
- Hyper Freak Exercise (1999) (Audio CD)
- Hyper Freak Exercise DVD (2001) (DVD)
- Super Virtuosity DVD (2004) (DVD)
