= Freak Kitchen =

Swedish rock band

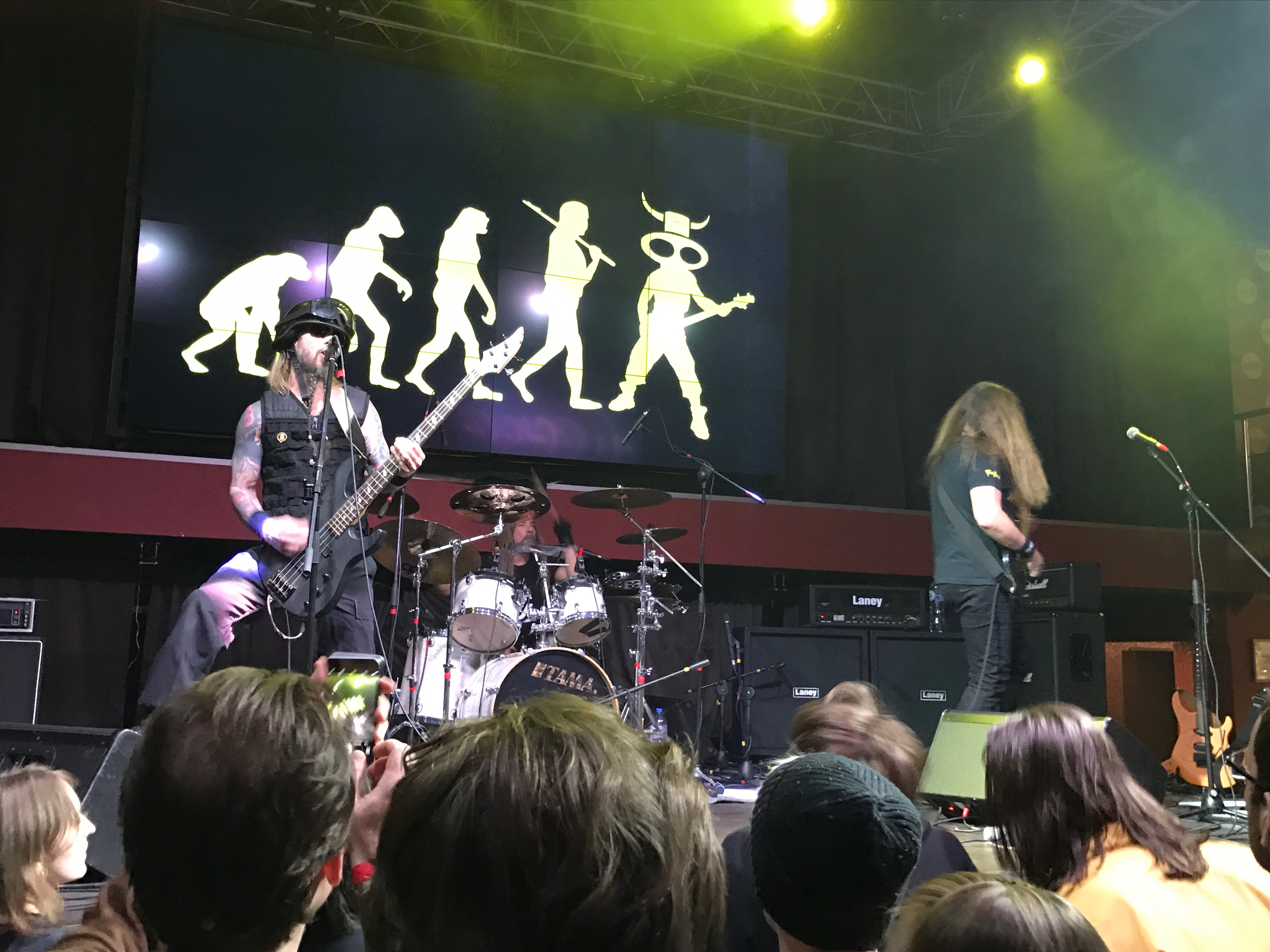
- Freak Kitchen performing in Moscow in 2017

Background information
- Origin: Gothenburg, Sweden
- Genres: Heavy metal; hard rock; progressive metal
- Years active: 1992–present
- Label: Thunderstruck
- Members: Mattias "IA" Eklundh; Björn Fryklund; Christer Örtefors
- Past members: Joakim Sjöberg; Christian Grönlund
- Website: www.freakkitchen.com

Freak Kitchen is a Swedish rock band from Gothenburg, formed in 1992.

== History ==
Freak Kitchen co-headlined Fuel Great Indian Rock 2008 alongside Sahg and Satyricon.

Their album, Cooking with Pagans, was released in 2014, with the first single, "Professional Help" released in November.

== Musical style ==
Freak Kitchen's style of music is influenced by many genres besides traditional heavy metal, ranging from jazz to pop. The band described their third album as "A corny little heavy-pop-rock-Latin-world-jazz-avant-garde-metal-blues-record straight from hell!". The album Land of the Freaks, which was released in late October 2009, is inspired by Indian music, with the band joined by the two Indian musicians V. Selvaganesh and Neyveli S Radhakrishna on several tracks.

The lyrics of Freak Kitchen often contain humor and criticism of capitalist society, conformity, racism and the attitude of major labels.

== Members ==
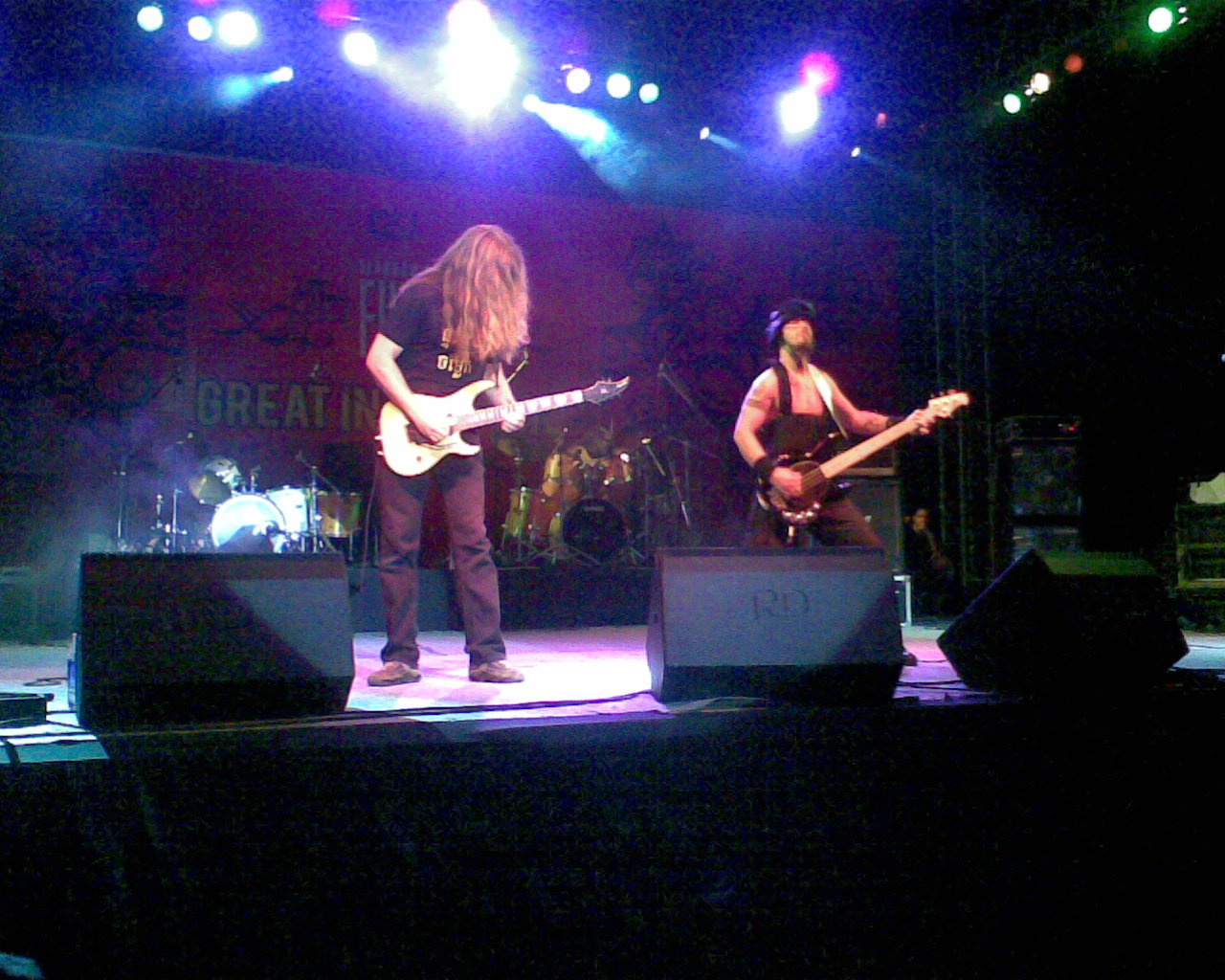
Freak Kitchen in 2008. L–R: Christer Örtefors, Björn Fryklund.

Current

- Mattias "IA" Eklundh – vocals, guitar (1992–present)
- Christer Örtefors – bass, vocals (2000–present)
- Björn Fryklund – drums (2000–present)

Previous

- Christian Grönlund – bass, vocals (1992–2000)
- Joakim Sjöberg – drums (1992–2000)

== Discography ==
Albums

- Appetizer (Thunderstruck Productions, 1994)
- Spanking Hour (Thunderstruck Productions, 1996)
- Freak Kitchen (Thunderstruck Productions, 1998)
- Dead Soul Men (Thunderstruck Productions, 2000)
- Move (Thunderstruck Productions, 2002)
- Organic (Thunderstruck Productions, 2005)
- Land of the Freaks (Thunderstruck Productions, 2009)
- Cooking with Pagans (Thunderstruck Productions, 2014)
- Confusion to the Enemy (Thunderstruck Productions, 2018)
- Everyone Gets Bloody (Thunderstruck Productions, 2024)

EPs

- Junk Tooth (1997)
