= Jonas Hellborg =

Swedish bassist

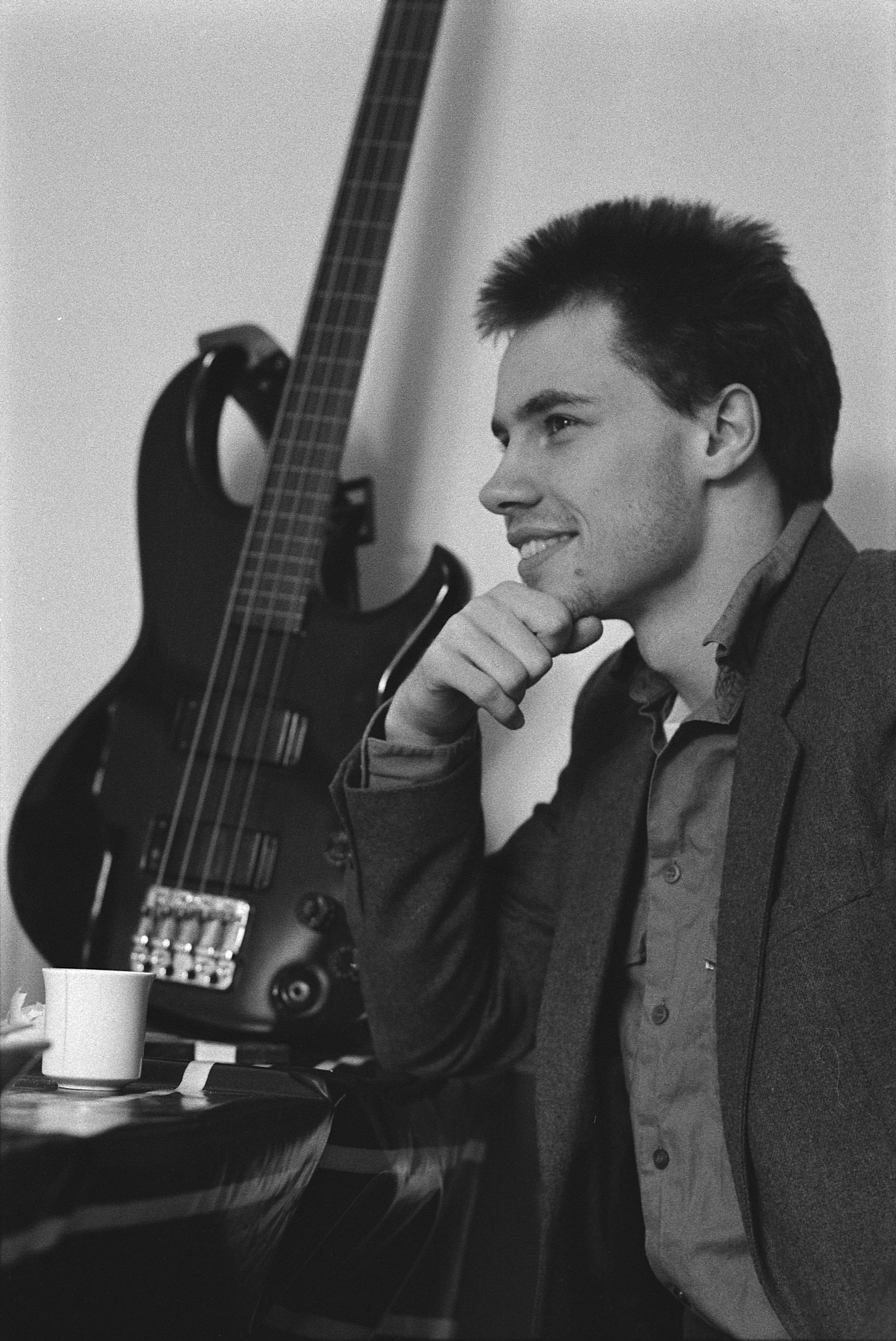
- Hellborg in 1983

Background information
- Born: 7 June 1958 (age 68)
- Origin: Sweden
- Genres: Jazz fusion; progressive rock; carnatic music; world fusion
- Occupations: Musician; composer
- Instrument: Bass

Jonas Hellborg (born 7 June 1958) is a Swedish bass guitarist. He has collaborated with John McLaughlin, Ustad Sultan Khan, Fazal Qureshi, Bill Laswell, Shawn Lane, Jens Johansson, Anders Johansson, Ginger Baker, Michael Shrieve, V. Selvaganesh, Jeff Sipe, Mattias IA Eklundh, Public Image Ltd, Devin Townsend and Buckethead.

== Recording career ==
Hellborg began his music career in 1976 in Sweden touring with local rock acts. He was spotted by percussionist Reebop Kwaku Baah in a small club in Stockholm 1979 and he moved to London for a year to work with Reebop on different projects. He played the Montreux Jazz festival in Switzerland in 1981 and met Michael Brecker, who introduced him to John McLaughlin, Billy Cobham and other fusion stars. He was asked to join McLaughlin's reformed Mahavishnu Orchestra in 1983. He stayed with McLaughlin until 1988, touring and recording with Mahavishnu Orchestra. He also did several duet tours with McLaughlin during this time.

In 1986 and 1987 he toured with a project featuring Ginger Baker on drums and Bernie Worrell on keyboards, which appears on Hellborg's 1988 album Bass. They continued to perform together in 1989.

In 1988 Hellborg moved to New York and started his own band which first included keyboardist Aydin Esen and drummer Kenwood Dennard, and later the Johansson Brothers, Jens on keyboards and Anders on drums. He started a recording studio together with producer/bassist Bill Laswell called Greenpoint Studios. They recorded a multitude of records there until early 1993, including The Word together with Tony Williams, Octave of the Holy Innocents with Mike Shrieve and Buckethead, Material's Hallucination Engine, and E with the Johansson Brothers.

In 1993 he sold his part in the studio to Laswell and resettled in Paris, France. The following year he teamed up with guitarist Shawn Lane, a cooperation that would last nine years. The first record was Abstract Logic with Ginger Baker's son Kofi on drums; this was followed by Michael Shrieve's Two Doors. By the third record they were joined by drummer Jeff Sipe and embarked on a long stretch that produced four records and a lot of touring between 1995 and 1997.

In 1998 Hellborg met percussionist V. Selvaganesh at a Zakir Hussain concert in Paris. The two formed a musical partnership that has been ongoing since then. To start with, Selvaganesh joined Hellborg in duets and in different "classical" settings Hellborg was working on at the time. Later a group was formed, first in trio with Lane, then a quintet including Selvaganesh's two brothers V. Umashankar and V. Umamahesh. Two CDs and a DVD were produced with this group. After Shawn Lane's death in 2003, Hellborg has continued to explore amalgamations of Indian and Western music, working with Indian masters as Debashish Bhattacharya, Niladri Kumar, Vikku Vinayakram, Tanmoy Bose and U. Shrinivas. He has also started a new metal-fusion project with guitarist Mattias IA Eklundh called Art Metal.

Hellborg founded his own record label, Day Eight Music (D.E.M.), in 1979, releasing his first solo bass record, The Bassic Thing – an early showcase of his pioneering chordal, and for the time very advanced, slapping approaches. It was the first LP ever to feature solely bass guitar. With the move to the US, a new entity was formed, called Bardo Music, that took over the responsibilities of Hellborg's output, now counting around 40 releases.

== Musical equipment ==
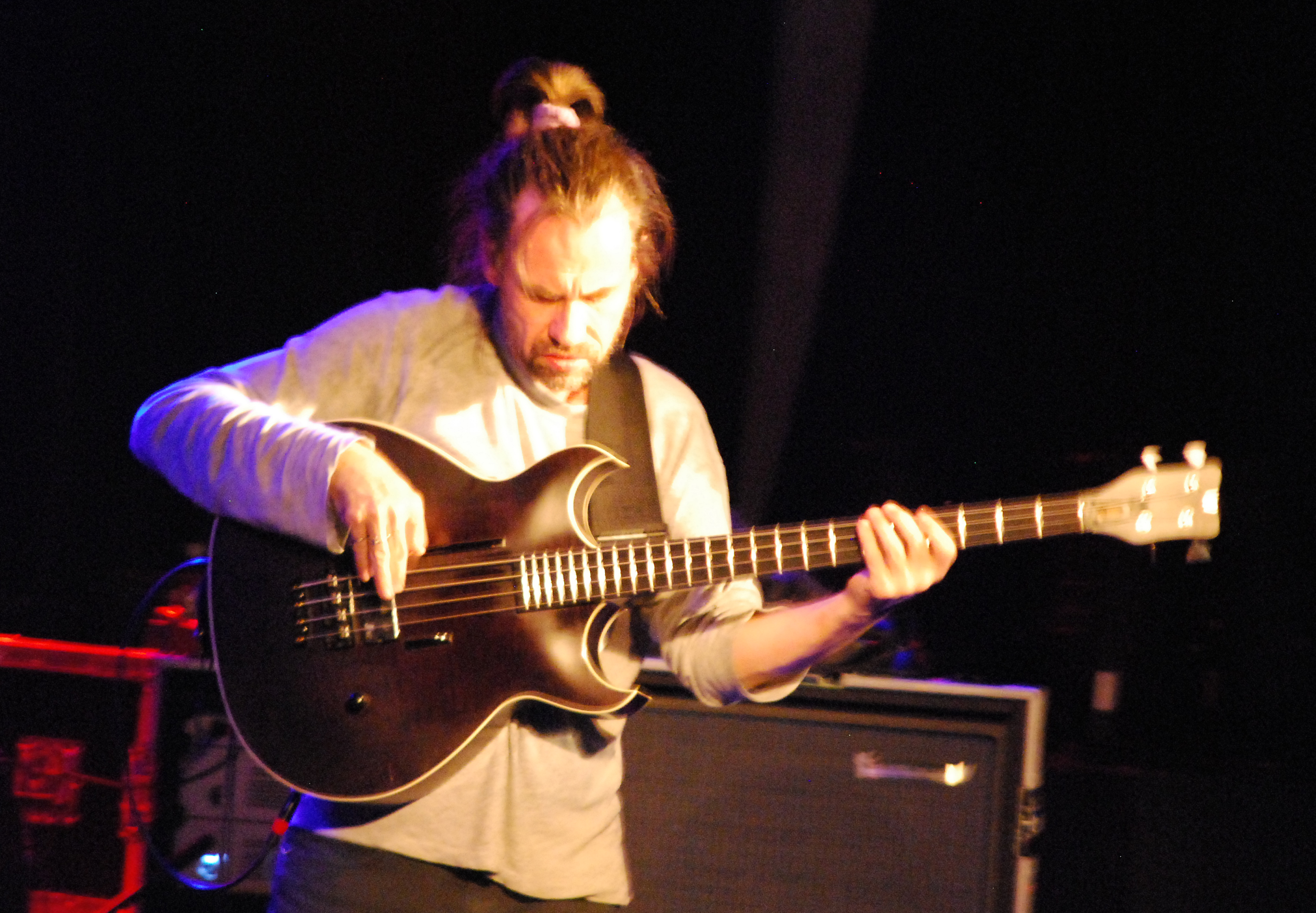
Hellborg with his signature Warwick bass model, Innsbruck 2011

Hellborg has been involved in instrument design from early in his career. His work includes a signature model for Aria, the first ever biamped bass amplifier (in cooperation with Italian company FBT), a double neck bass, fretted and fretless, for British company Wal in 1983, and, in 1984, an acoustic bass in collaboration with master luthier Abraham Wechter.

After working with a half dozen other companies with signature models and inventions he, together with the German manufacturer Warwick, created a new bass and a high end line of bass amplification.

Hellborg published two books in the early '80s with Music Sales of London, one on slap bass called Thumb Bassics, and a chord book called Chord Bassics.

== Acting ==
As a teenager Hellborg appeared as an actor in the TV series Hem till byn (Home to the Village), a widely popular dramatic series inspired by everyday life in Sweden, in which Jonas's mother, actress Tove Waltenburg, played one of the main characters. He appeared in the first three seasons, in 1971, 1973 and 1976, as well as in one episode in season four (in 1990), where his character has become a famous bass player. According to IMDb, playing Anders Persson in Hem till Byn is his only acting credit.

== Discography ==
As band leader

- The Bassic Thing (solo bass) (1979), Day Eight Music
- Dreamland (1983), Day Eight Music
- Elegant Punk (solo bass) (1984), Day Eight Music
- Axis (1986), Day Eight Music
- Bass (1988), Day Eight Music
- Adfa (1989), Day Eight Music
- The Silent Life (acoustic solo bass) (1991), Day Eight Music
- Jonas Hellborg Group (1990), Day Eight Music
- Jonas Hellborg Group E (1991), Day Eight Music
- The Word (1991), Axiom
- Ars Moriende (1994), Day Eight Music (with Glen Velez)
- Abstract Logic (1995), Bardo
- Octave of the Holy Innocents (1993), Day Eight Music (re-released 2003, Bardo)
- Temporal Analogues of Paradise (1996), Bardo
- Time Is the Enemy (1997), Bardo
- Aram of the Two Rivers (1999), Bardo
- Zenhouse (1999), Bardo
- Good People in Times of Evil (2000), Bardo
- Personae (2002), Bardo
- Icon: A Transcontinental Gathering (2003), Bardo
- Paris (2004) (DVD), Bardo
- Kali's Son (2006), Bardo
- Art Metal (2007), Bardo
- The Jazz Raj (2014), Bardo
- The Concert Of Europe (2023, recorded 1987), Bardo

With The Mahavishnu Orchestra

- Mahavishnu (1984), Warner Bros.
- Adventures in Radioland (1986), Relativity

With Deadline

- Dissident (1991), Day Eight Music
- Down by Law, Cell

With Devin Townsend

- The Puzzle (2021), HevyDevy Records

With Michael Joseph Smith

- Faces, Day Eight Music
- All our steps, Day Eight Music

With Michael Shrieve

- Two Doors (1995), CMP, with Shawn Lane
- THE LEAVING TIME, NOVUS/BMG

With Public Image Ltd

- Album (1986), Virgin

With Trilok Gurtu

- Usfret, CMP

With Sultan Khan and Fazal Qureshi

- Friends Across Boundaries, Ninaad Music

With Ginger Baker

- Unseen Rain, Day Eight Music
- Middle Passage, Axiom

With Kollektiv

- feat. Jonas Hellborg, ITM

With Jens Johansson

- Fjäderlösa tvåfotingar, Day Eight Music

With Anders Johansson

- Shutka, Day Eight Music
- Red Shift, Heptagon

With RAF (feat. Peter Brötzmann, Bill Laswell, Jamal Evans)

- Ode to a Tractor (1992), Day Eight Music

With Reebop

- Melodies in a Jungle Man's Head, Day Eight Music

With Shining Path

- No Other World (1992)

With Busch-Werk

- Busch-Werk & the Masters of Groove (DVD) (2009), Zauberhaus-Records (feat. Nippy Noya, and Famoudou Konaté)
- Trance (2011), Zauberhaus-Records (feat. Nippy Noya, Famoudou Konaté, and Baba Sissoko)
