= Billy Cobham discography =

The discography of jazz/jazz fusion drummer Billy Cobham includes solo, collaborative, and work playing on other artists' albums.

== Discography ==
=== As leader ===
Year	Title	Peak chart positions			Label	Notes
Year	Title	US	US R&B	US Jazz	Label	Notes
1973	Spectrum	26	―	1	Atlantic	
1974	Crosswinds	23	19	2	Atlantic	
1974	Total Eclipse	36	12	6	Atlantic	
1974	Shabazz [live]	74	―	―	Atlantic	
1975	A Funky Thide of Sings	79	32	15	Atlantic	
1976	Life & Times	128	―	―	Atlantic	
1976	"Live" on Tour in Europe	99	―	―	Atlantic	as The Billy Cobham–George Duke Band
1977	Magic	―	―	―	Columbia	
1978	Alivemutherforya [live]	―	―	―	Columbia	with Steve Khan, Alphonso Johnson, Tom Scott and Mark Sos
1978	Inner Conflicts	172	―	―	Atlantic	
1978	Simplicity of Expression: Depth of Thought	166	―	―	Columbia	
1979	B.C.	―	―	―	Columbia	
1980	Live: Flight Time [live]	―	―	―	Inak	
1981	Stratus	―	―	―	Inak	as Billy Cobham's Glassmenagerie
1982	Observations & Reflections	―	―	―	Elektra/Musician	as Billy Cobham's Glassmenagerie
1982	Smokin’ [live]	―	―	―	Elektra/Musician	as Billy Cobham's Glassmenagerie
1985	Warning	—	―	―	GRP	
1985	Consortium	—	―	―	GRP	with Johannes Faber
1986	Power Play	—	―	―	GRP	
1987	Best Of	―	―	―		
1987	Picture This	—	—	―	GRP	
1989	Incoming	—	—	―	K-Tel	
1990	No Filters	―	―	―		with Wolfgang Schmid
1992	By Design	―	―	―		
1994	The Traveler	―	―	―		
1996	Nordic	―	―	―		
1996	Paradox	―	―	―		
1998	Paradox, The First Second [live]	―	―	―		
1998	Mississippi Nights Live [live]	―	―	―		
1999	Focused	―	―	―		
1999	Ensemble New Hope Street	―	―	―		
1999	Nordic: Off Color	―	―	―		
2001	North by NorthWest	―	―	―		
2002	Drum 'n' Voice	―	―	―		
2002	The Art of Three [live]	―	―	―		
2002	Many Years B.C. [compilation]	―	―	―		
2002	Culture Mix	―	―	―		
2004	The Art of Five	―	―	―		
2005	Caravaggio	―	―	―		with Massimo Colombo
2006	Art of Four [live]	―	―	―		
2006	Drum 'n' Voice 2	―	―	―		
2007	Fruit from the Loom	―	―	―		
2008	De Cuba y de Panama	―	―	―		with Asere
2010	Palindrome	―	―	―		
2010	Drum 'n' Voice 3	―	―	―		
2013	Compass Point	―	―	―		
2014	Tales From The Skeleton Coast	―	―	―		
2015	Ayajala Live	―	―	―		
2015	Spectrum 40 Live	―	―	―		
2016	Drum 'n' Voice 4	―	―	―		
2016	Broad Horizon	―	―	―		with Frankfurt Radio Big Band
2020	Tierra Del Fuego	―	―	―		
2022	Drum 'n' Voice 5	―	―	―		
"—" denotes releases that did not chart or were not released in that territory.

=== As sideman ===
With Mose Allison

- Western Man (Atlantic, 1971)
- Lessons in Living (1982)

With Gene Ammons

- Got My Own (Prestige, 1972)
- Big Bad Jug (Prestige, 1973)

With Ray Barretto

- The Other Road (1973)

With George Benson

- Giblet Gravy (1968)
- White Rabbit (CTI, 1972)

With Bobby and the Midnites

- Bobby and the Midnites (1981)
- Where the Beat Meets the Street (1984)

With The Brothers Johnson

- Look Out for #1 (1976)

With James Brown

- Make It Funky: The Big Payback 1971-1975 (1996)

With Kenny Burrell

- Night Song (Verve, 1969)
- God Bless the Child (CTI, 1971)

With Cargo

- Cargo (1982)

With Ron Carter

- Uptown Conversation (Embryo, 1970)
- Blues Farm (CTI, 1973)
- All Blues (CTI, 1973)
- Spanish Blue (CTI, 1974)
- Yellow & Green (CTI, 1976)
- New York Slick (Milestone, 1980)
- Empire Jazz (RSO, 1980)

With Stanley Clarke

- School Days (1976)
- Atlanta with George Duke (1983)
- Live at the Greek with Larry Carlton (1993)

With Larry Coryell

- Spaces (1974)
- The Essential Larry Coryell (1975)
- Spaces Revisited (1997)

With Miles Davis

- Bitches Brew (1970)
- Live-Evil (1970)
- A Tribute to Jack Johnson (1970)
- Big Fun (1974)
- Get Up with It (1974)
- Circle in the Round (1979)
- Directions (recorded 11.3.1960-27.2.1970, released 1980)

With Richard Davis

- Way Out West (recorded 1977, Muse, 1980)
- Fancy Free (Galaxy, 1977)

With Eumir Deodato

- Prelude (1972)
- Deodato 2 (1973)
- Whirlwinds (1974)

With Dreams

- Dreams (1970)
- Imagine My Surprise (1971)

With Charles Earland

- Intensity (Prestige, 1972)

With Gil Evans

- Live at the Public Theater (New York 1980) (Trio, 1981)

With Fania All Stars

- Latin-Soul-Rock (1974)

With Roberta Flack and Donny Hathaway

- Roberta Flack & Donny Hathaway (1980)

With Peter Gabriel

- Passion: Music for The Last Temptation of Christ (1989)

With Johnny Hammond

- Breakout (Kudu, 1971)
- Wild Horses Rock Steady (Kudu, 1971)
- The Prophet (Kudu, 1972)

With Billy Harper

- Capra Black (Strata-East, 1973)

With Donald Harrison

- Heroes (Nagel Heyer, 2004)
- New York Cool: Live at The Blue Note (Half Note, 2005)
- This Is Jazz: Live at The Blue Note (Half Note, 2011)

With Freddie Hubbard

- Sky Dive (CTI, 1973)

With Jackie and Roy

- Time & Love (CTI, 1972)

With Milt Jackson

- Sunflower (CTI, 1972)

With Jazz Is Dead

- Blue Light Rain (1998)

With Quincy Jones

- The Anderson Tapes (1971)
- I Heard That!! (1976)

With Robin Kenyatta

- Gypsy Man (Atlantic, 1973)

With Hubert Laws

- Morning Star (CTI, 1972)
- Carnegie Hall (CTI, 1973)

With Mahavishnu Orchestra

- Inner Mounting Flame (1971)
- Birds of Fire (1973)
- Between Nothingness and Eternity (1973)
- The Lost Trident Sessions (recorded 1973, released 1999)
- Mahavishnu (1984)

With Junior Mance

- With a Lotta Help from My Friends (Atlantic, 1970)

With Arif Mardin

- Journey (Atlantic, 1974)

With Les McCann

- Comment (Atlantic, 1970)

With John McLaughlin

- My Goal's Beyond (Columbia, 1971)
- Love Devotion Surrender with Carlos Santana (Columbia, 1973)
- Electric Guitarist (Columbia, 1978)

With Mark-Almond Band

- Rising (1972)
- To the Heart (1976)

With Jimmy Owens

- Headin' Home (A&M/Horizon, 1978)

With Sonny Rollins

- The Way I Feel (Milestone, 1976)
- Don’t Stop the Carnival (Milestone, 1978)

With Michel Sardaby

- Michel Sardaby in New York (Sound Hills, 2002)

With Don Sebesky

- Giant Box (CTI, 1973)

With Horace Silver

- Serenade to a Soul Sister (1968)
- You Gotta Take a Little Love (1969)

With Carly Simon

- Hotcakes (1974)

With Lonnie Smith

- Mama Wailer (Kudu, 1971)

With Gábor Szabó

- Mizrab (CTI, 1972)

With Leon Thomas

- The Leon Thomas Album (Flying Dutchman, 1970)

With McCoy Tyner

- Fly with the Wind (Milestone, 1976)

With Stanley Turrentine

- Sugar (CTI, 1970)
- Ain't No Way (Blue Note, 1980, recorded 1969)

With Stanley Turrentine and Milt Jackson

- Cherry (CTI, 1972)

With Miroslav Vitous

- Purple (1970)

With Grover Washington, Jr.

- All the King's Horses (Kudu, 1972)
- Soul Box (Kudu, 1973)

With Randy Weston

- Blue Moses (CTI, 1972)

With Paul Winter

- Traps on Sunwheel and on Whole Earth Chant (1972)
