= The Inner Mounting Flame Tour =

1971–72 concert tour by Mahavishnu Orchestra

- Tour by Mahavishnu Orchestra
- Associated album: The Inner Mounting Flame
- Start date: July 21, 1971
- End date: December 27, 1972
- Legs: 3
- No. of shows: 177 in North America; 5 in Europe; 182 in total (186 scheduled)

Mahavishnu Orchestra concert chronology
- The Inner Mounting Flame Tour (1971–72); Birds of Fire Tour (1973)

The Inner Mounting Flame Tour was the first concert tour by the jazz fusion band Mahavishnu Orchestra.

== History ==
The band's first ever live performance was on July 21, 1971 at the Gaslight at the Au Go Go in New York City, where they opened for blues guitarist John Lee Hooker. McLaughlin recalled: "The first set was shaky but the second set just took off and every night it was great. They wanted to hold us over and a few days after the second week ... we went into the studio". The band ending up doing a 18-date residency at the night club. The band ended up performing in several colleges, high schools, night clubs, music venues with a capacity of less than a thousand people, and small arenas and sports venues across the United States. The band also played at the Mar y Sol Pop Festival in Puerto Rico, the Summerfest festival in Milwaukee, and many more festivals across North America. The group also played in Europe for the first time, simply appearing at music festivals. The band grew to popularity thanks to appearing at festivals and touring endlessly, and the group's shows were praised by The Harvard Crimson and The New York Times.

== Live releases ==
Live material from this tour has appeared on the following releases:

- "The Noonward Race" from April 3, 1972 at the Mar y Sol Pop Festival in Puerto Rico was released on the 1972 live album Mar Y Sol: The First International Puerto Rico Pop Festival, the 2011 re-release of the 1980 compilation album The Best of the Mahavishnu Orchestra and the 2011 remaster of The Inner Mounting Flame.

== Tour dates ==
Date	City	Country	Venue
North America
July 21, 1971 (Note: The band opened for John Lee Hooker on July 21–26, 1971.)	New York City	United States	Gaslight at the Au Go Go
July 22, 1971	New York City	United States	Gaslight at the Au Go Go
July 23, 1971	New York City	United States	Gaslight at the Au Go Go
July 24, 1971	New York City	United States	Gaslight at the Au Go Go
July 25, 1971	New York City	United States	Gaslight at the Au Go Go
July 26, 1971	New York City	United States	Gaslight at the Au Go Go
July 28, 1971 (Note: The band opened for Spencer Davis and Peter Jameson on July 28–August 2, 1971.)	New York City	United States	Gaslight at the Au Go Go
July 29, 1971	New York City	United States	Gaslight at the Au Go Go
July 30, 1971	New York City	United States	Gaslight at the Au Go Go
July 31, 1971	New York City	United States	Gaslight at the Au Go Go
August 1, 1971	New York City	United States	Gaslight at the Au Go Go
August 2, 1971	New York City	United States	Gaslight at the Au Go Go
August 4, 1971	New York City	United States	Gaslight at the Au Go Go
August 5, 1971	New York City	United States	Gaslight at the Au Go Go
August 6, 1971	New York City	United States	Gaslight at the Au Go Go
August 7, 1971	New York City	United States	Gaslight at the Au Go Go
August 8, 1971	New York City	United States	Gaslight at the Au Go Go
August 9, 1971	New York City	United States	Gaslight at the Au Go Go
September 14, 1971 (2 shows) (Note: The band opened for the Steve Miller Band and the Cannonball Adderley Quintet on September 14–15, 1971.)	New York City	United States	Beacon Theatre
September 15, 1971 (2 shows)	New York City	United States	Beacon Theatre
October 2, 1971	Madison	United States	Baldwin Gym
October 22, 1971	Providence	United States	Alumnae Hall
November 4, 1971	Syracuse	United States	Jabberwocky
November 5, 1971	Syracuse	United States	Jabberwocky
November 6, 1971	Syracuse	United States	Jabberwocky
November 18, 1971 (Note: The band opened for Blue Öyster Cult and the Byrds on November 18 and 20, December 3–4, 9–11, 1971.)	Durham	United States	University of New Hampshire
November 20, 1971	Cortland	United States	Lusk Field House
November 28, 1971 (Note: The band opened for Yes and the Kinks on November 28, 1971.)	Stony Brook	United States	Pritchard Gymnasium
December 3, 1971	Orono	United States	Memorial Hall
December 4, 1971	Kingston	United States	Frank W. Keaney Gymnasium
December 9, 1971	Potsdam	United States	Clarkson College of Technology Gymnasium
December 10, 1971	Burlington	United States	Roy L. Patrick Gymnasium
December 11, 1971 (2 shows)	Stony Brook	United States	Pritchard Gymnasium
December 21, 1971	Chicago	United States	Quiet Knight
December 22, 1971	Chicago	United States	Quiet Knight
December 23, 1971	Chicago	United States	Quiet Knight
December 24, 1971	Chicago	United States	Quiet Knight
December 25, 1971	Chicago	United States	Quiet Knight
December 26, 1971	Chicago	United States	Quiet Knight
December 29, 1971	New York City	United States	Carnegie Hall
January 22, 1972 (Note: The band opened for Jerry Garcia and Howard Wales on January 22–23, 26, 28–29, 1972.)	Schenectady	United States	Memorial Chapel
January 23, 1972	Philadelphia	United States	Villanova Field House
January 26, 1972	Boston	United States	Symphony Hall
January 28, 1972	Providence	United States	Loew's Theatre
January 29, 1972	Buffalo	United States	Century Theatre
February 3, 1972	Roslyn	United States	My Father's Place
February 4, 1972	Roslyn	United States	My Father's Place
February 5, 1972	Roslyn	United States	My Father's Place
February 6, 1972	Roslyn	United States	My Father's Place
February 12, 1972	Nashville	United States	Neely Auditorium
February 18, 1972 (Note: The band opened for T. Rex on February 18, 1972.)	Philadelphia	United States	Spectrum
February 19, 1972	East Garden City	United States	Nassau Community College
February 20, 1972	Brockport	United States	SUNY Brockport
February 25, 1972	Columbia	United States	Carolina Coliseum
February 26, 1972	Grinnell	United States	Grinnell College
February 27, 1972	Minneapolis	United States	Guthrie Theater
February 28, 1972	Columbia	United States	Livestock Center
March 1, 1972	Evanston	United States	Cahn Auditorium
March 3, 1972	Milwaukee	United States	Milwaukee Performing Arts Center
March 4, 1972	Worcester	United States	Clark University
March 8, 1972	West Chester	United States	Hollinger Field House
March 11, 1972	Bethlehem	United States	Grace Hall
March 12, 1972	Oswego	United States	Laker Hall
March 17, 1972	Brownsville	United States	Zodiac
March 18, 1972	Waterville	United States	Horsetrader and Coffee House
March 21, 1972 (Note: The band opened for Emerson, Lake & Palmer on March 21–23, 1972.)	Denver	United States	Denver Coliseum
March 22, 1972	Long Beach	United States	Long Beach Arena
March 23, 1972 (2 shows)	Santa Monica	United States	Santa Monica Civic Auditorium
March 24, 1972	San Francisco	United States	Winterland Ballroom
March 25, 1972	San Francisco	United States	Winterland Ballroom
March 27, 1972	Los Angeles	United States	Whisky a Go Go
March 28, 1972	Los Angeles	United States	Whisky a Go Go
April 1, 1972	Princeton	United States	Alexander Hall
April 3, 1972 (Note: The concert on April 3, 1972 was a part of the Mar y Sol Pop Festival.)	Manatí	Puerto Rico	Tortuguero Lagoon
April 7, 1972	Ewing Township	United States	Kendall Hall
April 8, 1972	Asbury Park	United States	Sunshine In
April 9, 1972	New York City	United States	Philharmonic Hall
April 11, 1972	Wilmington	United States	Delcastle Technical High School
April 14, 1972	Carlisle	United States	Dickinson Dining Hall
April 16, 1972	Boston	United States	Aquarius Theater
April 17, 1972	Detroit	United States	Cobo Arena
April 19, 1972	Middletown	United States	Dave Finkelman Auditorium
April 20, 1972	Yellow Springs	United States	Antioch College
April 21, 1972	Cleveland	United States	Public Hall
April 22, 1972	Marietta	United States	Ban Johnson Field House
April 23, 1972	Cincinnati	United States	Xavier University Fieldhouse
April 24, 1972	Bloomington	United States	Town Cinema Theatre
April 25, 1972	Indianapolis	United States	Ritz Theater
April 28, 1972	Providence	United States	George V. Meehan Auditorium
April 29, 1972	Syracuse	United States	Skytop
April 29, 1972	Hamilton	United States	Cotterell Court
April 30, 1972	Buffalo	United States	Kleinhans Music Hall
~~May 4, 1972~~	~~New York City~~	United States	~~City College of the City University of New York~~
May 5, 1972	New Haven	United States	Woolsey Hall
May 6, 1972	Coral Gables	United States	Union Patio
May 7, 1972	Atlanta	United States	Sports Arena
May 9, 1972 (Note: The concert on May 9, 1972 was rescheduled from May 4, 1972.)	New York City	United States	City College of the City University of New York
May 12, 1972	Indiana	United States	College Lodge
May 13, 1972	Blackwood	United States	Camden County College
May 14, 1972	Alfred	United States	Alfred University
May 15, 1972	New York City	United States	Assembly Hall
May 17, 1972	Newtown	United States	Council Rock High School North
May 20, 1972	Passaic	United States	Capitol Theatre
May 21, 1972	Chicago	United States	Auditorium Theatre
May 24, 1972	Boca Raton	United States	Florida Atlantic University
May 26, 1972	Tampa	United States	Fort Homer W. Hesterly Armory
May 27, 1972 (Note: The band opened for Seatrain on May 27, 1972.)	Pembroke Pines	United States	Hollywood Sportatorium
May 28, 1972	Tallahassee	United States	Bobby Tully Gymnasium
June 2, 1972	Orlando	United States	Orlando Sports Stadium
June 9, 1972	Dallas	United States	Dallas Memorial Auditorium
June 10, 1972	Austin	United States	Armadillo World Headquarters
June 11, 1972	Houston	United States	Hofheinz Pavilion
June 12, 1972 (2 shows)	San Diego	United States	The Funky Quarters
June 14, 1972	Los Angeles	United States	Whisky a Go Go
June 15, 1972	Los Angeles	United States	Whisky a Go Go
June 16, 1972	Los Angeles	United States	Whisky a Go Go
June 17, 1972	Los Angeles	United States	Whisky a Go Go
June 18, 1972 (Note: The band opened for Cheech & Chong on June 18, 1972.)	Berkeley	United States	Berkeley Community Theatre
June 21, 1972	Boston	United States	Boston Common
July 6, 1972 (2 shows) (Note: The band's concert on June 6, 1972 was a part of the Newport Jazz Festival-New York.)	New York City	United States	Carnegie Hall
July 7, 1972	Hartford	United States	Bushnell Memorial Hall
July 8, 1972	Stockbridge	United States	Lenox Arts Center at the Music Inn
July 10, 1972	Amherst	United States	Student Union Ballroom
July 17, 1972	Hackensack	United States	Orrie de Nooyer Auditorium
July 19, 1972	Cincinnati	United States	Reflections
July 20, 1972	Columbus	United States	Agora Ballroom
July 21, 1972	Dayton	United States	Victoria Opera House
July 22, 1972	Indianapolis	United States	Ritz Theater
July 23, 1972 (Note: The concert on July 23, 1972 was a part of Summerfest.)	Milwaukee	United States	Henry Maier Festival Park
July 29, 1972 (2 shows)	Westport	United States	Staples High School
July 30, 1972	Hyannis	United States	Cape Cod Melody Tent
July 31, 1972	Gaithersburg	United States	Shady Grove Music Fair
August 4, 1972	Wildwood	United States	Wildwood Convention Hall
August 5, 1972 (Note: The concert on August 5, 1972 was a part of the Schaefer Music Festival.)	New York City	United States	Wollman Rink
August 7, 1972	Baltimore	United States	Painters Mill Music Fair
August 9, 1972 (Note: The concert on August 5, 1972 was a part of the Ravinia Festival.)	Highland Park	United States	The Pavilion
August 10, 1972	Detroit	United States	Ford Auditorium
August 11, 1972 (Note: The band opened for Yes on August 11, 1972.)	Akron	United States	Rubber Bowl
~~August 12, 1972~~	~~Ann Arbor~~	United States	~~Crisler Arena~~
August 13, 1972	Minneapolis	United States	Guthrie Theater
Europe
~~August 15, 1972~~	~~Copenhagen~~	~~Denmark~~	—N/a
August 17, 1972 (Note: The concert on August 17, 1972 was a part of Jazz Now!.)	Munich	West Germany	Deutsches Museum
August 20, 1972 (Note: The concert on August 20, 1972 was a part of the Montreux Jazz Festival.)	Montreux	Switzerland	Pavillon Montreux
~~August 21, 1972~~	~~Saint-Tropez~~	France	—N/a
August 23, 1972 (Note: The concert on August 23, 1972 was a part of the Châteauvallon Jazz Festival.)	Ollioules	France	Châteauvallon-Scène nationale
August 25, 1972 (Note: The concert on August 25, 1972 was for Sounds for Saturday.)	London	England	Paris Theatre
September 2, 1972 (Note: The concert on September 2, 1972 was a part of Garden Party V.)	London	England	Crystal Palace Bowl
North America
September 8, 1972	Durham	United States	Cameron Indoor Stadium
September 9, 1972	Atlanta	United States	Atlanta Symphony Hall
September 15, 1972	Middletown	United States	Wesleyan Hockey Rink
September 16, 1972	Putney	United States	Windham College Fieldhouse
September 17, 1972	Troy	United States	RPI Field House
September 22, 1972	Rutherford	United States	Rutherford Campus Gymnasium
September 23, 1972	Pittsburgh	United States	Soldiers and Sailors Memorial Hall and Museum
October 1, 1972	Philadelphia	United States	Academy of Music
October 6, 1972	Buffalo	United States	Buffalo State Union Social Hall
October 13, 1972	Washington, D.C.	United States	Lisner Auditorium
October 14, 1972	Cincinnati	United States	Cincinnati Gardens
October 15, 1972	Coral Gables	United States	Union Patio
October 27, 1972	Boston	United States	Aquarius Theater
October 28, 1972	Princeton	United States	Alexander Hall
October 29, 1972 (2 shows)	Plattsburgh	United States	Hawkins Hall
November 3, 1972	Chicago	United States	Aragon Ballroom
November 4, 1972	Lawrence	United States	Hoch Auditorium
November 5, 1972	St. Louis	United States	Kiel Auditorium
November 6, 1972	Albuquerque	United States	Student Union Ballroom
November 9, 1972	Berkeley	United States	Berkeley Community Theatre
November 10, 1972	Santa Monica	United States	Santa Monica Civic Auditorium
November 11, 1972	Seattle	United States	Paramount Theatre
November 19, 1972	Waterbury	United States	Palace Theater
December 1, 1972	Middlebury	United States	Middlebury College
December 2, 1972	Providence	United States	Palace Concert Theater
December 3, 1972	Williamstown	United States	Chapin Hall
December 5, 1972	Loretto	United States	Maurice Stokes Field House
December 8, 1972	Poughkeepsie	United States	Kenyon Gym
December 9, 1972	Philadelphia	United States	Irvine Auditorium
December 10, 1972	New Britain	United States	Welte Auditorium
December 27, 1972	Pembroke Pines	United States	Miami-Hollywood Motorsports Park

== Personnel ==
- John McLaughlin - guitar
- Jerry Goodman - violin
- Rick Laird - bass guitar
- Jan Hammer - keyboards, organ
- Billy Cobham - drums, percussion
