= Mahavishnu Orchestra: The Complete Columbia Albums Collection =

The Complete Columbia Albums Collection

Box set by Mahavishnu Orchestra
- Released: 2011
- Recorded: 1971–73
- Genre: Jazz fusion, progressive rock
- Length: 249:31
- Label: Sony Music, Columbia, Legacy
- Producer: John McLaughlin, Bob Belden, Richard Seidel

The Complete Columbia Albums Collection is a box set by Mahavishnu Orchestra. It came out in 2011 and it contains remastered versions of all the albums by the first incarnation of the band, including The Lost Trident Sessions, which was to be the band's third studio album, recorded in 1973 but only released in 1999. Additionally, the first album, The Inner Mounting Flame, contains a bonus live track; the live album Between Nothingness & Eternity was remixed and expanded; and the box includes a previously unreleased live CD called Unreleased Tracks from Between Nothingness & Eternity. The box comes with a 16-page booklet with short liner notes by John McLaughlin and Richard Seidel.

== Track listing ==
CD1 - The Inner Mounting Flame (1971)
CD2 - Birds of Fire (1973)
CD3 - The Lost Trident Sessions (recorded 1973, released 1999)
CD4 - Between Nothingness & Eternity (1973)
CD5 - Unreleased Tracks from Between Nothingness & Eternity (recorded 1973, released 2011)

== Personnel ==
- John McLaughlin - double neck electric guitar (six and twelve-string), acoustic guitar
- Jan Hammer - keyboards
- Jerry Goodman - violin
- Rick Laird - bass
- Billy Cobham - percussion
