= Assembly hall (disambiguation) =

An assembly hall is a large room for public meetings or a type of building.

Assembly hall may also refer to:

== United Kingdom ==
- General Assembly Hall of the Church of Scotland in Edinburgh, Scotland.
- Assembly Hall Theatre, Tunbridge Wells in Royal Tunbridge Wells, England.

== United States ==
- State Farm Center, known as Assembly Hall until 2013, an arena in Champaign, Illinois.
- Simon Skjodt Assembly Hall, known as Assembly Hall until 2016, an arena in Bloomington, Indiana.
- Assembly Hall (Washington, Mississippi), a NRHP-listed tavern in Washington, Mississippi.
- Old Municipal Assembly Hall, Victoria, Texas, listed on the NRHP in Victoria County, Texas
- Salt Lake Assembly Hall, in Salt Lake City, Utah
- Assembly Hall (Hunter College), in New York City

== Other countries ==
- Assembly Hall, Warwick, Australia
- Mansudae Assembly Hall, North Korea
- Former Tainan Assembly Hall, Taiwan

== See also ==
- Assembly rooms
