= Apocalypse (Mahavishnu Orchestra album) =

Studio album by Mahavishnu Orchestra
- Released: April 1974
- Recorded: March 1974
- Studio: AIR Studios (London)
- Genre: Jazz fusion
- Length: 52:23
- Label: Columbia
- Producer: George Martin

Mahavishnu Orchestra chronology
Between Nothingness and Eternity (1973)	Apocalypse (1974)	Visions of the Emerald Beyond (1975)

Professional ratings
Review scores
Source	Rating
AllMusic	4/5 stars
Christgau's Record Guide	C
Sputnikmusic	3.5/5
The Rolling Stone Jazz Record Guide	2/5 stars
The Penguin Guide to Jazz Recordings	2/4 stars

Apocalypse is the third studio album by the jazz fusion band Mahavishnu Orchestra. Released in 1974 by Columbia Records, it is the first album of the second lineup of the Mahavishnu Orchestra and features the London Symphony Orchestra. It was produced by George Martin, who regarded it as "one of the best records [he had] ever made". It is the fourth album in its chronology after Between Nothingness and Eternity.

The back cover features a poem by Sri Chinmoy as well as a group photo of those who created the album.

== Track listing ==
All music composed by John McLaughlin; lyrics to "Smile of the Beyond" composed by "Mahalakshmi" Eve McLaughlin.

Side one
No.	Title	Length
1.	"Power of Love"	4:36
2.	"Vision Is a Naked Sword"	14:16
3.	"Smile of the Beyond"	7:56

Side two
No.	Title	Length
1.	"Wings of Karma"	6:12
2.	"Hymn to Him"	19:23

== Personnel ==
- John McLaughlin – guitars, vocal composer
- Gayle Moran – keyboards, vocals
- Jean-Luc Ponty – electric violin, electric baritone violin
- Ralphe Armstrong – bass guitar, vocals
- Narada Michael Walden – drums, percussion, vocals

with

- Michael Tilson Thomas – conductor, piano
- Michael Gibbs – orchestration
- Marsha Westbrook – viola
- George Martin – producer
- Carol Shive – violin, vocals
- Philip Hirschi – cello, vocals
- Geoff Emerick – engineer

== Charts ==
Chart (1974)	Peak position
Australian Albums (Kent Music Report)	82
Canada Top Albums/CDs (RPM)	29
Finnish Albums (The Official Finnish Charts)	30
US Billboard 200	43
US Top Jazz Albums (Billboard)	10
