= Unreleased Tracks from Between Nothingness & Eternity =

Live album by the Mahavishnu Orchestra
- Released: 2011
- Recorded: August 17–18, 1973
- Venue: Wollman Rink (Central Park, New York City)
- Genre: Jazz fusion
- Length: 64:01
- Label: Columbia
- Producer: John McLaughlin

The Mahavishnu Orchestra chronology
The Lost Trident Sessions (1999)	Unreleased Tracks from Between Nothingness & Eternity (2011)

Unreleased Tracks from Between Nothingness & Eternity is a live album by the Mahavishnu Orchestra, first released in 2011 as part of The Complete Columbia Albums Collection boxset, along with the other albums by the first line-up of the band, including The Lost Trident Sessions. As the title explains, the album contains other selections from the two Central Park shows from August 1973 from which the live album Between Nothingness and Eternity was culled.

== Track listing ==
All music is composed by John McLaughlin, except where noted.

No.	Title	Length
1.	"Hope"	1:48
2.	"Awakening"	14:09
3.	"You Know, You Know"	7:12
4.	"One Word"	18:31
5.	"Stepping Tones" (music: Rick Laird)	2:01
6.	"Vital Transformation"	6:16
7.	"The Dance of Maya"	14:04
Total length:		64:01

Tracks 3, 4 and 7 are from the August 17 show, while the rest of the tracks are from August 18.

== Personnel ==
- John McLaughlin – guitar
- Jan Hammer – keyboards
- Jerry Goodman – violin
- Rick Laird – bass
- Billy Cobham – percussion
