= Visions of the Emerald Beyond =

Visions of The Emerald Beyond

Studio album by Mahavishnu Orchestra
- Released: February 1975
- Recorded: December 1974
- Studio: Electric Lady Studios, New York City; mixed at Trident Studios, London
- Genre: Jazz fusion
- Length: 40:23
- Label: Columbia
- Producer: Ken Scott, Mahavishnu John McLaughlin

Mahavishnu Orchestra chronology
Apocalypse (1974)	Visions of The Emerald Beyond (1975)	Inner Worlds (1976)

Professional ratings
Review scores
Source	Rating
Allmusic	3/5 stars
Christgau's Record Guide	C+
The Rolling Stone Jazz Record Guide	2/5 stars
The Penguin Guide to Jazz Recordings	2/4 stars

Visions of the Emerald Beyond is the fifth album by the jazz fusion group Mahavishnu Orchestra, and the second released by its second incarnation.

According to the liner notes, the album was recorded at Electric Lady Studios in New York City from December 4 until December 14, 1974. It was then mixed at Trident Studios in London from December 16 until December 24, 1974.

== Poem ==
This poem by Sri Chinmoy, titled "Visions of the Emerald Beyond", was printed on the album cover.

"No more am I the foolish customer
of a dry, sterile, intellectual breeze.
I shall buy only
the weaving visions of the emerald Beyond.
My heart-tapestry
shall capture the Himalayan Smiles
of my Pilot Supreme.
In the burial of my sunken mind
is the revival of my climbing heart.
In the burial of my deceased mind
is the festival of my all-embracing life."

== Track listing ==
All songs by John McLaughlin except where indicated.

Side one
No.	Title	Length
1.	"Eternity's Breath - Part 1"	3:10
2.	"Eternity's Breath - Part 2"	4:50
3.	"Lila's Dance"	5:37
4.	"Can't Stand Your Funk"	2:10
5.	"Pastoral"	3:41
6.	"Faith"	2:01

Side two
No.	Title	Music	Length
1.	"Cosmic Strut"	Narada Michael Walden	3:21
2.	"If I Could See"		1:17
3.	"Be Happy"		3:33
4.	"Earth Ship"		3:43
5.	"Pegasus"		1:48
6.	"Opus 1"		0:25
7.	"On the Way Home to Earth"		4:45

== Personnel ==
=== Mahavishnu Orchestra ===
- John McLaughlin – guitars, vocals
- Jean-Luc Ponty – violin, vocals, electric violin, baritone violin
- Ralphe Armstrong – bass guitar, vocals, contrabass
- Narada Michael Walden – percussion, drums, vocals, clavinet
- Gayle Moran – keyboards, vocals

=== Others ===
- Carol Shive – 2nd violin, vocals
- Russell Tubbs – alto and soprano sax
- Philip Hirschi – cello
- Bob Knapp – flute, trumpet, flugelhorn, vocals, wind
- Steve Kindler – 1st violin

== Charts ==
Chart (1975)	Peak position
Australian Albums (Kent Music Report)	74
New Zealand Albums (RMNZ)	32
US Billboard 200	68
US Top Jazz Albums (Billboard)	18
