= Rick Laird =

Irish jazz bassist (1941–2021)

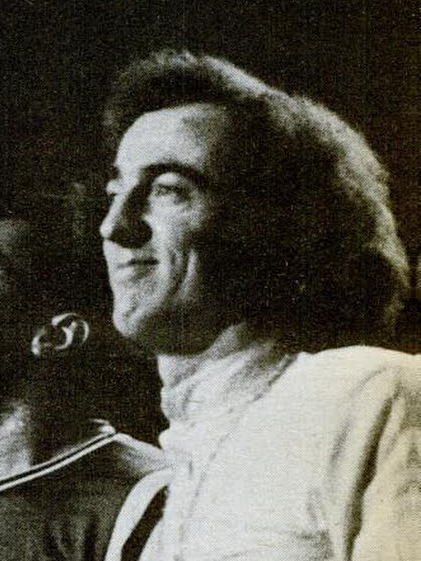
- Rick Laird in 1973.

Background information
- Born: Richard Quentin Laird; 5 February 1941; Dublin, Ireland
- Origin: Auckland, New Zealand
- Died: 4 July 2021 (aged 80) New City, Rockland County, New York, U.S.
- Genres: Jazz fusion
- Instruments: Bass guitar; double bass
- Years active: 1962–2021

Richard Quentin Laird (February 5, 1941 – July 4, 2021) was an Irish musician, best known as the bassist and a founding member of the jazz fusion band Mahavishnu Orchestra, with which he performed from 1971 to 1973.

== Early life ==
Laird was born in Dublin on 5 February 1941 to a musical family. His mother played the piano in a variety of styles and his father played the ukulele; Laird started playing both instruments when he was three. At around five years of age, Laird started formal tuition in the guitar and piano, and he had already started to read sheet music. He soon quit the piano as he did not perform well, which led him to take up painting and drawing. At twelve, Laird began lessons in Spanish guitar, but his teacher used books that he felt were too difficult, so he quit. He then discovered jazz from his mother, who bought her son a pair of drum brushes and made him play along to records.

== Career ==
=== Early career ===
At sixteen, Laird moved to New Zealand with his father and worked on a sheep farm. It was there that he took music seriously, first picking up an Australian Maton guitar, learning chords, and playing along to songs on the radio. After listening to an Oscar Peterson record featuring bassist Ray Brown, Laird noted Brown "doing such incredible things" and started to play bass lines on his guitar. He bought a string bass and played along to Brown's records; two weeks later he joined a local group in Auckland where, at eighteen, he "quit his day job" and became a professional bassist.

Laird's first band soon split, but he joined another which featured pianist Mike Nock and toured New Zealand extensively. When Laird was nineteen, he moved to Sydney, Australia for two years, where there was a more active jazz scene; he played with many top jazz musicians including Don Burrows, and performed in jazz quartets on the radio. Around this time, Laird's goal was to move to the US, but he was encouraged to relocate to England in 1962.

While in England, Laird toured with the vocal ensemble Lambert, Hendricks, and Ross, which led to a stint with Zoot Sims and saxophonist Al Cohn, followed by session work. From 1963 to 1964, Laird studied at the Guildhall School of Music and Drama and played in The Brian Auger Trinity (July 1963–February 1964) and The Brian Auger Group (February–October 1964), the latter of which featured guitarist John McLaughlin. Laird clashed with Auger when he was asked to switch from upright to electric bass to complement the music they were playing, but Laird refused. Laird then accepted the offer to become house bassist at Ronnie Scott's Jazz Club, playing with many visiting musicians including Wes Montgomery and Sonny Stitt. It became a valuable learning experience for Laird, as the group were given considerable freedom and Laird received constructive and helpful advice from the other musicians. Laird is featured on the soundtrack of Alfie (1966) with Sonny Rollins. With Buddy Rich, he played a residence at The Talk of the Town in 1969.

=== Move to the United States and Mahavishnu Orchestra ===
In 1966, Laird won a scholarship to study at Berklee College of Music in Boston, Massachusetts after sending a tape of himself playing with Stan Getz. There, Laird studied arranging, composition, and the string bass. In 1968, he took up the bass guitar "so I could be heard." He gained confidence to take up the instrument after seeing The Tony Williams Lifetime in concert.

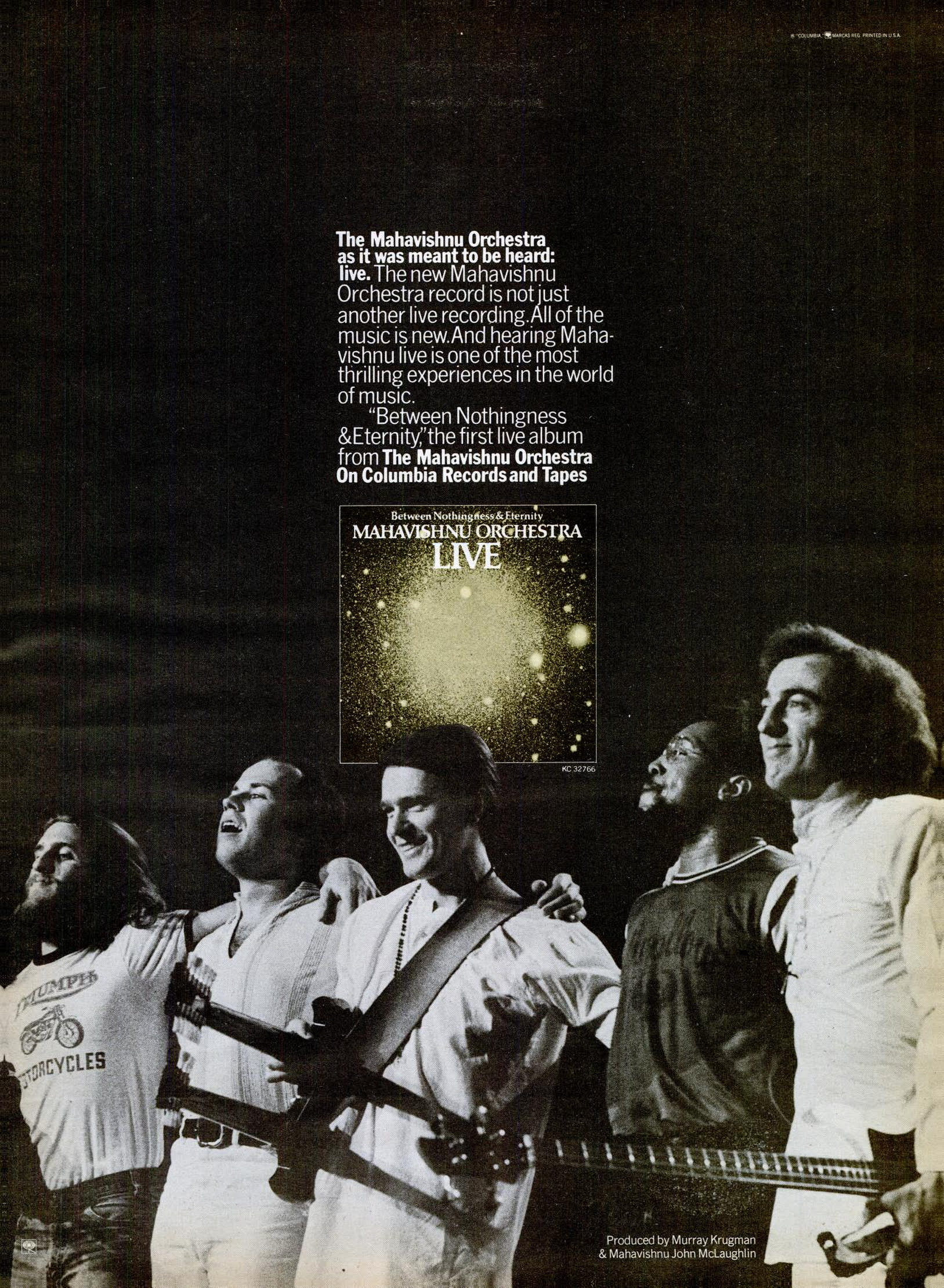
Laird as part of the band Mahavishnu Orchestra in an advertisement in 1973. From left to right: Jerry Goodman, Jan Hammer, John McLaughlin, Billy Cobham, Rick Laird

Laird was a founding member and electric bassist of the jazz fusion band Mahavishnu Orchestra, the original line-up of which were active from June 1971 to December 1973. Guitar Player described Laird's playing: "Laird's solid, economical lines in conjunction with Billy Cobham's meticulous, powerful drumming provided a strong anchor for the odd-tempo and often volatile solos [from the rest of the band]". After the band split, Laird moved to New York City and played with Stan Getz (a tour in 1977) and Chick Corea (a tour the following year). Laird put out one album as a leader, Soft Focus.

=== Later career ===
Laird retired as a performing musician in 1982. He became a successful photographer and bass teacher. He authored two intermediate- to advanced-level bass books. In 1999, Laird had started to compose on his daughter's iMac computer. He said: "I have no agenda. It's just for my own enjoyment. Besides, I've come to realise our main gig on this planet is not what we do for a living – it's to find out who we are, and to learn how to love ourselves and love others." Laird was one of a handful of musicians to play an S. D. Curlee, which was his principal fretted bass.

In March 2009, Laird discovered a collection of photographs that he had taken of musical artists, including Miles Davis, Chick Corea, Wayne Shorter, the Mahavishnu Orchestra, Elvin Jones, Keith Jarrett and many others. Much of his collection was posted online.

== Death ==
In early 2021, Laird's daughter announced that he had entered hospice care. Laird died of lung cancer in New City, Rockland County, New York on 4 July 2021, aged 80.

== Discography ==
=== As leader ===
- Soft Focus (Timeless Muse, 1979)

=== As sideman ===
With Horacee Arnold

- Tales of the Exonerated Flea (Columbia, 1974)

With Richie Cole

- New York Afternoon (Muse, 1977)
- Alto Madness with Eddie Jefferson (Muse, 1978)
- Keeper of the Flame (Muse, 1979)

With Eddie Daniels

- Brief Encounter (Muse, 1977)

With Stan Getz

- Mort d'un Pourri (Melba, 1977) - Soundtrack

With Benny Golson

- Three Little Words (Jazz House, 1997)

With Eddie Jefferson

- Still on the Planet (Muse, 1976)
- The Live-Liest (Muse, 1979)

With Vic Juris

- Roadsong (Muse, 1978)

With Rahsaan Roland Kirk

- Gifts & Messages (Mercury, 1964)
- Live in London (Harkit, 2004)

With Eric Kloss

- Battle of the Saxes with Richie Cole (Muse, 1976)

With Prince Lasha

- Insight (CBS, 1966)

With Yusef Lateef

- Live at Ronnie Scott's 15 Jan 1966 (Gearbox Records, 2017)

With The Mahavishnu Orchestra

- The Inner Mounting Flame (Columbia, 1971)
- Birds of Fire (Columbia, 1973)
- Between Nothingness & Eternity (Columbia, 1973)
- The Best of Mahavishnu Orchestra (Columbia, 1980)
- The Lost Trident Sessions (Columbia, 1999)
- Unreleased Tracks from Between Nothingness & Eternity (Columbia, 2011)
- The Complete Columbia Albums Collection (Columbia, 2011)

With Czesław Niemen

- Mourner's Rhapsody (Import Records, 1976)

With Gerry Niewood

- Gerry Niewood and Timepiece (A&M/Horizon, 1977)

With Anita O'Day

- Ao vivo no 150 Night Club (Estúdio Eldorado, 1984)

With Buddy Rich

- Keep the Customer Satisfied (Pacific Jazz, 1970)

With Sonny Rollins

- Live in London (Harkit, 2004)
- Live in London, Vol. 2 (Harkit, 2005)
- Live in London, Vol. 3 (Harkit, 2006)

With Annie Ross

- You and Me Baby (Decca, 1971)

With Clive Stevens & Friends

- Atmospheres (Capitol, 1974)

With Stan Tracey

- Laughin' & Scratchin' (Jazz House, 1966)

With Treasure

- Treasure (Epic, 1977)

== Instructional books ==
- Laird, Rick. (1978) Jazz Riffs for Bass
- Laird, Rick. (1980) Improvising Jazz Bass (Music Sales Corp)
