= On the Future of Aviation =

Studio album by Jerry Goodman
- Released: 1985
- Studios: Studiomedia, Evanston, Illinois
- Genre: Progressive rock
- Length: 42:14
- Labels: Private Music; 1301
- Producers: Jerry Goodman, Martin Rubenstein

Jerry Goodman chronology
On the Future of Aviation (1985)	Ariel (1986)

On the Future of Aviation is an album by violinist Jerry Goodman. It was recorded at Studiomedia in Evanston, Illinois, and was released by Private Music in 1985. On the album, Goodman is joined by keyboardist Fred Simon and drummer Paul Wertico. Vocalist Linda Sears, keyboardist Jeffery Vanston, and drummer Phil Gratteau also appear on several tracks.

== Reception ==
Professional ratings
Review scores
Source	Rating
AllMusic	4.5/5 stars

In a review for AllMusic, William Ruhlmann wrote: "Fans of the original Mahavishnu lineup may have expected a jazz fusion effort with Goodman's amplified violin soaring above all; instead, On the Future of Aviation contains pop-style compositions in which individual virtuosity is only a part of the overall conception... As long as listeners are willing to encounter a stimulating composer rather than the violin soloist of old, they will enjoy Goodman's return to active duty."

Spin's Richard Gehr stated that, on the album, "Goodman assembles a dramatic synthesis that recalls his past work as electric violinist for the Flock and Mahavishnu Orchestra. This is reading music that verily swings. Light and pleasantly bombastic at the same time."

Author John Schaefer praised the "stellar recording and production," and commented: "Goodman is a virtuoso violinist, and he ain't too shabby on guitar, either. The title track is the best."

A writer for KUVO Jazz noted that the album stands "in marked contrast" to Goodman's earlier recordings, and described it as "subtle, yet complex; intricate yet understated."

== Track listing ==
All songs written and arranged by Jerry Goodman.

1. "On the Future of Aviation" – 6:36
2. "Endless November" – 8:40
3. "Outcast Islands" – 6:34
4. "Orangutango" – 6:26
5. "Waltz of the Windmills" – 5:50
6. "Sarah's Lullaby" – 5:42

== Personnel ==
- Jerry Goodman – acoustic violin, electric violin, acoustic guitar, electric guitar, mandolin, viola, synthesizer
- Fred Simon – synthesizer
- Paul Wertico – drums
- Linda Sears – vocals (tracks 1, 5, 6)
- Jeffery Vanston – synthesizer (track 3)
- Phil Gratteau – drums (track 4)
