= Fred Simon =

American pianist and composer

- Born: Frederick Victor Simon
- Genres: Jazz
- Occupation: Musician
- Instrument: Piano
- Years active: 1970s–present
- Labels: Flying Fish, Windham Hill, Naim, NorthSound
- Formerly of: Simon & Bard

Frederick Victor Simon is an American pianist and composer.

Simon first gained recognition with Simon & Bard, the jazz fusion group he founded in Chicago with composer and reed player Michael Bard, drummer Phil Gratteau, and bassist Ken Haebich. The group toured widely and recorded three acclaimed albums including collaborations with Larry Coryell and Ralph Towner. Members of the Simon & Bard group Paul Wertico and Steve Rodby left to join the Pat Metheny Group, and Mark Walker left to join the band Oregon. Simon often performs in the Chicago area with his wife, drummer Sarah Allen, and frequently collaborates with guitarist David Onderdonk.

== The Beach Boys Distilled ==
In 2018, Al Gomes and Connie Watrous of Big Noise served as Executive Producers, along with Simon, for the remastering and re-release of Simon's collection of solo piano interpretations of pop classics by The Beach Boys. Grammy Award-winning Beach Boys producer Alan Boyd also assisted heavily with the project. The album was placed on the Official Ballot for the 61st Annual Grammy Awards by The Recording Academy for Best Contemporary Instrumental Album. Further validation of the recording was achieved when The Beach Boys' official magazine ESQ posted a rave review of the album. 'Just beautiful,' said Beach Boy Mike Love.

== Discography ==
- Short Story, (Quaver, 1984)
- Time and the River, (Quaver, 1985)
- Usually/Always, (Windham Hill, 1988)
- Open Book, (Columbia, 1991)
- Twilight with Teja Bell and Paul McCandless (NorthSound, 1996)
- Summer Nights with Spencer Brewer and Paul McCandless (NorthSound, 1996)
- Dreamhouse (Naim Audio, 2000)
- Fred Simon's Interpretation of the Beach Boys, (NorthSound, 2003)
- Remember The River with Steve Rodby and Paul McCandless, (Naim, 2004)
- Since Forever with Steve Rodby, Paul McCandless and Mark Walker (Naim, 2009)
- Reflections with Ira Antelis (Artists and Brands, 2013)
- The Beach Boys Distilled (Fred Simon Music, 2018)

With Simon & Bard

- Musaic featuring Larry Coryell (Flying Fish, 1980)
- Tear It Up with Ralph Towner (Flying Fish, 1982)
- The Enormous Radio (Flying Fish, 1984)

With Jerry Goodman

- On the Future of Aviation (Private Music, 1985)
