= Love Devotion Surrender =

Studio album by Santana & McLaughlin
- Released: June 22, 1973
- Recorded: October 1972, March 1973
- Genre: Jazz fusion
- Length: 38:44
- Label: Columbia
- Producers: Carlos Santana & Mahavishnu John McLaughlin

Carlos Santana chronology
Caravanserai (1972)	Love Devotion Surrender (1973)	Welcome (1973)

John McLaughlin chronology
Birds of Fire (1973)	Love Devotion Surrender (1973)	Between Nothingness and Eternity (1973)

Love Devotion Surrender is an album released in 1973 by guitarists Carlos Santana and John McLaughlin, with the backing of their respective bands, Santana and The Mahavishnu Orchestra. The album was inspired by the teachings of Sri Chinmoy and intended as a tribute to John Coltrane. It contains two Coltrane compositions, two McLaughlin songs, and a traditional gospel song arranged by Santana and McLaughlin. It was certified Gold in 1973.

In 2003, Love Devotion Surrender was released on CD with alternate versions as bonus tracks.

Santana and McLaughlin toured in 1973 and 1974 to support the album.

== Background ==
Both men were recent disciples of the guru Sri Chinmoy, and the title of the album echoes basic concepts of Chinmoy's philosophy, which focused on "love, devotion and surrender". Chinmoy spoke about the album and the concept of surrender:

Unfortunately, in the West surrender is misunderstood. We feel that if we surrender to someone, he will then lord it over us....But from the spiritual point of view...when the finite enters in the Infinite, it becomes the Infinite all at once. When a tiny drop enters into the ocean, we cannot trace the drop. It becomes the mighty ocean.

For both men the album came at a transitional moment spiritually and musically: Love Devotion Surrender was a "very public pursuit of their spiritual selves." Carlos Santana was moving from rock toward jazz and fusion, experiencing a "spiritual awakening", while McLaughlin was about to experience the break-up of the Mahavishnu Orchestra after being criticized by other band members. Santana had been a fan of McLaughlin, and McLaughlin had introduced Santana to Sri Chinmoy in 1971, at which time the guru bestowed the name "Devadip" on him, and the two had started playing and recording together in 1972. According to his biographer Marc Shapiro, Santana had much to learn from McLaughlin: "He would sit for hours, enthralled at the new ways to play that McLaughlin was teaching him," and his new spirituality had its effect on the music: "the feeling was that Carlos's newfound faith was present in every groove."

== Tracks ==
The first track, "A Love Supreme", is a version of the Coltrane composition "Acknowledgement" from the 1964 landmark album A Love Supreme. It features McLaughlin and Santana, both playing electric guitar, in an extended, improvised trading of bars. For the most part, Santana is panned to the left channel and McLaughlin to the right. As with the original, toward the end a chant of "A love supreme" is heard. (Only Armando Peraza is credited as a singer.)

"Naima" is another Coltrane composition, played on acoustic guitar. First appearing in 1959 on Coltrane's Giant Steps, it is a gentle song played in a straightforward manner.

"The Life Divine" again returns to Coltrane's A Love Supreme, opening with the chanted phrase "the love divine." The song's first part is extensive, high-tempo improvisation by Santana, alternating between quick phrases and long, sustained notes (including one that runs from 3:29 to 4:03). Midway through the song and introduced by the "life divine" chant, McLaughlin takes over with mostly high-speed staccato bursts and riffs. The chant returns, incorporating "it's yours and mine", and Larry Young's organ, with percussion, provide the outro.

"Let Us Go Into the House of the Lord" is a 16-minute-long track based on the traditional gospel song. The arrangement was credited to Santana and McLaughlin but Bob Palmer in Rolling Stone wrote that the arrangement is close enough to Lonnie Liston Smith's "to be described as a cop". Smith's arrangement was recorded in 1970 when he worked with Pharoah Sanders, who had recorded and worked closely with Coltrane. After the slow introductory statement (the part which resembles Smith's arrangement), most of the piece consists of soloing over two chords accompanied by a loping bass and Latin percussion. Of Larry Young's organ contribution here, Paul Stump, in Go Ahead John, wrote: "with its overlapping flurries of triplets, [it] is a moment of pure genius, worthy of mention in its own right, a musical equivalent of a swarm of surreally coloured butterflies." The track closes with a return to the slow introductory statement.

The final track, "Meditation", is a "pretty but light McLaughlin composition" that McLaughlin had previously recorded as a solo for exclusive use by the New York radio station WNEW-FM. McLaughlin plays piano, and Santana the acoustic guitar, on Love Devotion Surrender's version of the tune.

== Critical reception ==
Professional ratings
Review scores
Source	Rating
AllMusic	4.5/5 stars
Christgau's Record Guide	B−
The Rolling Stone Jazz Record Guide	2/5 stars
Rolling Stone	(not rated)

Criticism of the compositions and their execution is varied. In addition to noting the resemblance of "Let Us Go" to Smith's arrangement, Bob Palmer referred to the "superficial treatments" of Coltrane material, while Paul Stump, author of Go Ahead John, a McLaughlin biography, is negative about the album's execution and direction, saying it was, "in retrospect, a spiritually-hobbled album", criticizing Santana's tone and McLaughlin's "technophiliac tendencies" and "electronic gimmickry", and a "plink-plonk conga-heavy foursquare vamp all too typical of Santana" in "A Love Supreme". Thom Jurek is much more positive, praising, for instance, "The Life Divine" as "insanely knotty yet intervallically transcendent."

Fans of Santana were, apparently, disappointed; according to Thom Jurek, Love Devotion Surrender was a "hopelessly misunderstood record in its time by Santana fans", though Marc Shapiro's biography of Santana suggests otherwise.

Thom Jurek, reviewing the album for AllMusic, praises the album highly: "After three decades, Love Devotion Surrender still sounds completely radical and stunningly, movingly beautiful." Robert Palmer, writing for Rolling Stone, is ambivalent about the album, calling it "loud and insistent...depend[ent] on monochord drones and simple modes for its structure and on sheer screaming force for much of its effect." He thinks more highly of Carlos Santana's playing than of McLaughlin's, which he suggests lacks feeling and relies on technicality: "Here, at his most inspired, McLaughlin is exhilarating if a bit monolithic." Later, in a positive review of Santana's Welcome (1973), Palmer said the album "was simply a series of ecstatic jams on Coltrane and Coltrane-influenced material."

Many reviewers praise organist Larry Young. Thom Jurek says Young is the gel that holds the two very different guitar players together; Robert Palmer says "that the sensitive organ solos on Love Devotion Surrender were the best things on that album."

== Tour ==
A ten-city tour was done to promote the album during late summer of 1973, just after the summer Mahavishnu Orchestra tour. Each of the ten concerts lasted nearly three hours. The September 1st concert in Chicago was broadcast, and is easily available in its entirety. The band featured McLaughlin and Santana on guitar with Larry Young on keyboards, Doug Rauch on bass, Billy Cobham on drums and Armando Peraza on percussion. Just as the album itself, it consisted mostly of Coltrane covers, but also played was Cobham's "Taurian Matador." In contrast to the mixed reviews given the studio album, the reception of the live shows was almost universally ecstatic.

== Remix ==
In 2001, Bill Laswell, responsible for remixes of albums by Bob Marley and Miles Davis, mixed and remixed excerpts of Santana's Illuminations and Love Devotion Surrender, on an album called Divine Light.

Also on a SME SACD from Japan (Not the one above)

== Track listing ==
Side one
No.	Title	Writer(s)	Length
1.	"A Love Supreme"	John Coltrane	7:48
2.	"Naima"	Coltrane	3:09
3.	"The Life Divine"	John McLaughlin	9:30

Side two
No.	Title	Writer(s)	Length
4.	"Let Us Go Into the House of the Lord"	traditional	15:45
5.	"Meditation"	McLaughlin	2:45
Total length:			38:44

CD version bonus tracks
No.	Title	Writer(s)	Length
6.	"A Love Supreme" (take 2)	Coltrane	7:24
7.	"Naima" (take 4)	Coltrane	2:51

== Personnel ==
- Mahavishnu John McLaughlin – guitar, piano
- Carlos Santana – guitar
- Mahalakshmi Eve McLaughlin – piano
- Larry Young (under his Muslim name Khalid Yasin) – piano, organ
- Doug Rauch – bass guitar
- Jan Hammer – drums, percussion
- Billy Cobham – drums, percussion
- Don Alias – drums, percussion
- Mike Shrieve – drums, percussion
- Mingo Lewis – percussion
- Armando Peraza – congas, percussion, vocals

== Production ==
- Mahavishnu John McLaughlin – producer
- Carlos Santana – producer
- Glen Kolotkin – engineer
- Ashok – album design & cover photo
- Pranavananda – photography
- Sri Chinmoy – essay

== Charts ==
Chart (1973)	Peak position
Australian Albums (Kent Music Report)	10
Austrian Albums (Ö3 Austria)	14
Finnish Albums (The Official Finnish Charts)	17
German Albums (Offizielle Top 100)	26
Norwegian Albums (VG-lista)	19
Spanish Albums (AFE)	1
UK Albums (Official Charts)	7
US Billboard 200	14

== Certifications ==
Region	Certification	Certified units/sales
United States (RIAA)	Gold	500,000^{^}
^{^} Shipments figures based on certification alone.
