= Strat Andriotis =

- Born: 21 April 1963 (age 63); Elefsina, Greece
- Genres: Jazz, Rock, Neo-Classical
- Occupations: Guitarist & Composer
- Years active: 1990 - Present
- Labels: Dekatria, Innsbruck
- Website: stratmusic.net

Strat Andriotis (born April 21, 1963) is a Canadian-based jazz guitarist and composer.

Strat Andriotis Promo Shot 2023

== Life and career ==
Born in Elefsina, Greece, Andriotis began playing the piano at a young age taking classical piano lessons. Later on, he started playing the guitar with rock bands. In the early 1990s, Andriotis started recording albums with pianist Tom Carney. His first album titled First was released shortly after.

In 2004, Andriotis released an album titled Nice. In 2007, he joined promoter Lou Molinaro in his band alongside, drummer Albert Bouchard. Andriotis also played with drummer Roger Banks alongside keyboardist Jim Gilmour (Saga (band)) and bass icon Tony Levin. In 2014, Andriotis released a new album titled Liars Incorporated.

Andriotis earned his honors at the 2015 Hamilton Music Awards in the Instrumental Record of the Year, Classical Composition of the Year and Classical Recording of the Year for Liars Incorporated . All three of the guitarist's awards were handed out at the Saturday event, also held at Theatre Aquarius. In 2016, he released another album titled Less Off Patient with pianist Jeff Vidov and violinist Adrianna Lee. In 2018, Andriotis came up with a new album titled Night Manager featuring jazz rock violin icon Jerry Goodman and pianist Gonzalo Rubalcaba. In 2020, he released a new album titled Remember Me At Twilight.

== Discography ==
=== Albums ===
| Year | Album |
|---|---|
| 1995 | First (CD) |
| 1997 | Duo (CD) |
| 2000 | Tria (CD) |
| 2014 | Liars Incorporated (CD) |
| 2016 | Less Off Patient (CD, Album) |
| 2018 | Night Manager (CD, Album) |
| 2020 | Remember Me At Twilight (CD, Album) |
| 2025 | Exits (CD, Album) |

== See also ==
- Jerry Goodman
- Gonzalo Rubalcaba
