= Inner Worlds =

Studio album by Mahavishnu Orchestra
- Released: January 1976
- Recorded: July–August 1975
- Studio: Château d'Hérouville, France
- Genre: Jazz fusion
- Length: 44:07
- Label: Sony
- Producer: John McLaughlin with Dennis MacKay

Mahavishnu Orchestra chronology
Visions of the Emerald Beyond (1975)	Inner Worlds (1976)	Mahavishnu (1984)

John McLaughlin chronology
Visions of the Emerald Beyond (1975)	Inner Worlds (1976)	Shakti with John McLaughlin (1976)

Professional ratings
Review scores
Source	Rating
Allmusic	4.5/5 stars
Christgau's Record Guide	B−
The Rolling Stone Jazz Record Guide	2/5 stars

Inner Worlds is an album by the Mahavishnu Orchestra. It was the group's sixth album release, as well as their last for nearly ten years.

In 1975, violinist Jean-Luc Ponty and keyboardist Gayle Moran left the band. Stu Goldberg was brought in as a replacement for Moran. Although they were not officially recorded, initially this version of the group still retained Norma Jean Bell, Carol Shive, Phillip Hirschi, Russell Tubbs and Steve Kindler. After some hasty rehearsals, this line-up toured with Jeff Beck. After the tour, McLaughlin pared the band down to a quartet of himself, Goldberg, Walden and Armstrong, and then the album was recorded.

This would be the last album by the Mahavishnu Orchestra for nearly ten years, when leader and guitarist John McLaughlin formed an entirely different version of the group in 1984.

== Track listing and personnel ==
Side one
No.	Title	Music	Length
1.	"All in the Family"	John McLaughlin	6:02
2.	"Miles Out"	McLaughlin	6:44
3.	"In My Life"	Narada Michael Walden, McLaughlin	3:22
4.	"Gita"	McLaughlin	4:29
5.	"Morning Calls"	McLaughlin, Walden	1:23

Side two
No.	Title	Music	Length
6.	"The Way of the Pilgrim"	Walden	5:15
7.	"River of My Heart"	Walden	3:41
8.	"Planetary Citizen"	Ralphe Armstrong	2:14
9.	"Lotus Feet"	McLaughlin	4:24
10.	"Inner Worlds"	McLaughlin (part 1), Goldberg (part 2)	6:37

== Personnel ==
- John McLaughlin - Guitar, Guitar synthesizer, 12-string, acoustic guitar, backing vocals, synthesizer
- Stu Goldberg - organ, piano, synthesizers, backing vocals, clavinet
- Ralphe Armstrong - bass, double bass, vocals
- Narada Michael Walden - drums, percussion, marimba, piano, vocals, organ, timpani,

== Charts ==
Chart (1976)	Peak position
US Billboard 200	118
US Top Jazz Albums (Billboard)	24
