= Focused (album) =

Studio album by Billy Cobham
- Released: 9 February 1999
- Genre: Jazz funk, jazz fusion
- Length: 72:38 (CD)
- Label: Cleopatra
- Producer: Billy Cobham, Mark Meyerson, Donald Elfman & Naomi Yoshii

Billy Cobham chronology
Mississippi Nights Live (1998)	Focused (1999)	Ensemble New Hope Street (1999)

Professional ratings
Review scores
Source	Rating
Allmusic	4/5 stars
All About Jazz	(mixed)

Focused is a 1999 studio album by jazz fusion drummer Billy Cobham.

== Track listing ==
1. "Mirage" (Billy Cobham) – 10:43
2. "The Sleaze Factor" (Randy Brecker) – 7:11
3. "Walking In 5" (Billy Cobham) – 9:51
4. "How Was The Night?" (Stefan Rademacher) – 8:06
5. "Three Will Get You Four" (Billy Cobham) – 11:39
6. "Nothing Can Hurt Her Now" (Carl Orr) – 11:00
7. "Disfigured Mirrors" (Billy Cobham) – 7:22
8. "Avatar"(Gary Husband) – 6:46

== Personnel ==
- Billy Cobham – drums, percussion
- Randy Brecker – trumpet, flugelhorn
- Gary Husband – keyboards
- Carl Orr – guitars
- Stefan Rademacher – electric bass

Other credits

- Tristan Powell – engineer
