= S. D. Curlee =

American guitar manufacturer

- Company type: Private
- Industry: Manufacturing
- Founded: 1975; 50 years ago in Matteson, Illinois, United States
- Founders: Randy Curlee; Randy Dritz; Sonny Storbeck
- Defunct: 1982
- Fate: Ceased operations
- Headquarters: San Marcos, Texas, United States
- Products: Electric basses, guitars
- Footnotes / references Birdsong resurrected the S.D. Curlee brand in limited runs of bass guitars.

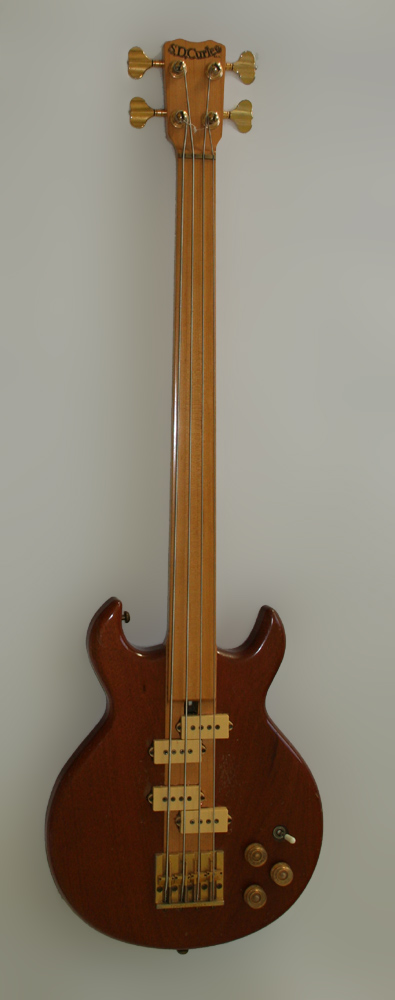
An example of an S.D. Curlee Fretless Bass electric bass

S.D. Curlee is a guitar manufacturer that originated in Matteson, Illinois and later relocated to central Texas.

The company experienced its peak production years between 1977 and 1981, after which it ceased operations until resuming in 2011. During its original period of activity, S.D. Curlee was particularly known for its electric basses. The instruments were exported internationally and found notable popularity in countries such as Ecuador, Belgium, Malaysia, and Germany.

== History ==
S.D. Curlee was founded in 1975 in Matteson, Illinois, by musician and businessman Randy Curlee, instrument designer Randy Dritz, and pattern maker Sonny Storbeck. The company name was derived from the initials of the founders: Storbeck, Dritz, and Curlee. Production began in early 1976 and ended in 1982.

The company officially produced approximately 15,000 instruments, though this number has been subject to dispute among the founders. Marketing efforts were aimed at promoting quality instruments at accessible prices, with advertising placed in Guitar Player magazine and the release of an eight-page color brochure in 1979.

S.D. Curlee also applied its brand name to imported instruments arranged by the company and licensed the name to Hondo. This was one of the early examples of a manufacturer addressing the issue of unlicensed copies by offering authorized, lower-cost versions.

In the early 1980s, market preferences shifted toward headless designs, vibrant colors, and new styles, prompting the company to introduce painted models that differed from its earlier natural-finish instruments. The company ceased operations in 1982.

Randy Curlee later worked in sales and marketing in the musical instrument industry, including positions with Yamaha’s Drums, Guitars & Amps Division and Peavey Guitars. He died in 2005 due to complications from diabetes.

== Construction ==
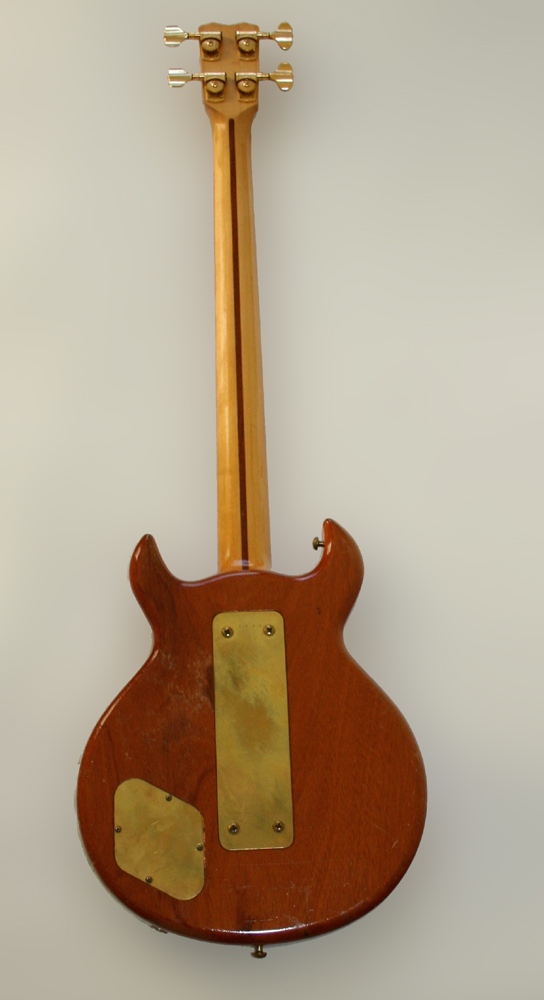
The rear view showing heavy brass neck plate

S.D. Curlee instruments incorporated a distinctive construction that combined features of neck-through-body and bolt-on neck designs. The neck was secured into the body using a heavy brass plate.

Most bass models from the 1970s shared a similar, nearly symmetrical body shape, influenced by the double cutaway design of the Gibson Les Paul Jr. These were available in both fretted and fretless versions. Primary models included:

- Standard 1: Mahogany body, maple neck, equipped with a single P-style DiMarzio pickup (originally a Gibson EB-style DiMarzio Model One near the bridge).
- Standard 2: Similar to the Standard 1 but with two pickups (P-style).
- Butcher: Constructed from butcher block maple.
- Liberty: Featured a Liberty Bell-shaped body, designed by Denny Rauen.
- Curbeck: Walnut body with maple stripes.
- Summit: Laminated walnut and maple body and neck.
- Yankee: Introduced in the early 1980s, featured active electronics, a walnut body, maple neck, and revised body contours. It was offered in several pickup configurations: Yankee I (1 P-style), Yankee II (2 P-style), and the rare Yankee II-J (1 P-style at bridge, 1 J-style at neck), with most examples being Yankee II.

Additional body shapes and models were prototyped and produced in limited numbers. Toward the end of the original production run, some instruments were branded "Curlee" (omitting the "S.D.") and included design changes such as painted finishes and set (glued-in) necks. These included models with P-bass-style bodies and "Star" shaped basses and guitars.

Hardware on S.D. Curlee basses typically included Grover tuning machines, brass or Badass II bridges, brass nuts, and high-output DiMarzio pickups. All basses featured a 32½" medium-scale neck. Some early U.S.-made models experienced truss rod issues over time. Later versions included design changes such as German Carve body edges and the use of aluminum plates in place of brass.

== Cultural effect and availability ==
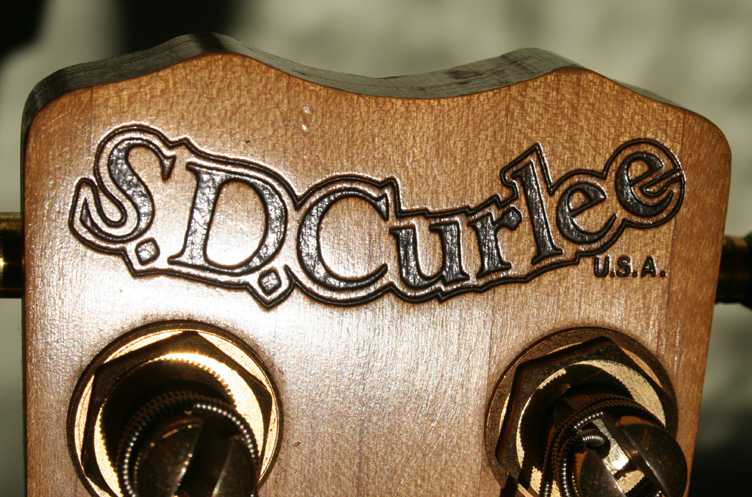
The branded logo headstock logo

While the S.D. Curlee brand has developed a cult following, it was associated with only a limited number of well-known bassists during its initial run in the mid- to late-1970s. Rick Laird owned one, and R. "Skeet" Curtis used one while touring with Parliament. Vincent Gallo played a Curlee bass in Gray, and Nick Lowe used a fretless model for select recordings. Jack Blades played a Curlee bass on the first Night Ranger album and in the video for "Don't Tell Me You Love Me." Alec John Such reportedly owned three. More recently, guitarist Adam McIlwee of Tigers Jaw has used a vintage Curlee guitar, and Brandt Huseman of The Greenberry Woods plays a vintage International Standard 1 bass.

On July 4, 2011, Scott Beckwith, owner of Birdsong Guitars, announced the revival of the S.D. Curlee brand. The modern instruments closely resemble the original models but incorporate contemporary hardware and upgrades. Current production is limited to U.S.-made basses, with fewer than 25 produced annually.
