= The Stranger's Hand (album) =

Studio album by Jerry Goodman, Steve Smith, Howard Levy, and Oteil Burbridge
- Released: 1999
- Recorded: January 7–16, 1999
- Studio: Neverland Studio, Marin County, California
- Genre: Jazz fusion
- Label: Tone Center Records; TC-40052
- Producer: Steve Smith

The Stranger's Hand is an album by violinist Jerry Goodman, drummer Steve Smith, multi-instrumentalist Howard Levy, and bassist Oteil Burbridge. It was recorded in January 1999 at Neverland Studio in Marin County, California, and was released later that year by Tone Center Records

== Reception ==
Professional ratings
Review scores
Source	Rating
AllMusic	4.5/5 stars
The Encyclopedia of Popular Music	4/5 stars

In a review for AllMusic, Jim Newsom wrote: "In the late 1990s, drummer Steve Smith set out to reinvigorate the long slumbering jazz-rock fusion movement with a series of all-star recordings... The Stranger's Hand is the best of the lot, with four instrumental masters coming together for nine days of spontaneous combustion that recalls the music's heyday while also bringing the freshness of new discovery into the updated mix."

David Adler of All About Jazz stated: "We're dealing with fusion of the virtuosic variety, so the fact that the playing is flawless is unsurprising and somehow beside the point."

== Track listing ==
1. "Brick Chicken" (Jerry Goodman) – 6:27
2. "Sufferin' Catfish" (Howard Levy) – 7:15
3. "Four, Four and More" (Howard Levy, Oteil Burbridge, Steve Smith) – 2:36
4. "Glimmer of Hope" (Jerry Goodman) – 6:44
5. "Pinky's Revenge" (Oteil Burbridge, Steve Smith) – 3:43
6. "Elvin" (Oteil Burbridge, Steve Smith) – 2:37
7. "Caliente" (Howard Levy) – 6:58
8. "Going Up!" (Howard Levy, Steve Smith) – 2:29
9. "Moonchild" (Howard Levy) – 5:05
10. "Stranger's Hand" (Howard Levy, Jerry Goodman, Oteil Burbridge, Steve Smith) – 7:18

== Personnel ==
- Jerry Goodman – violin, electric guitar
- Howard Levy – harmonica, piano, electric piano, ocarina
- Oteil Burbridge – bass
- Steve Smith – drums
