= The Lost Trident Sessions =

Studio album by Mahavishnu Orchestra
- Released: 21 September 1999
- Recorded: 25–29 June 1973
- Studio: Trident Studios, London
- Genre: Jazz fusion
- Length: 39:44
- Label: Columbia/SME
- Producer: Mahavishnu Orchestra, Bob Belden

Mahavishnu Orchestra chronology
Adventures in Radioland (1986)	The Lost Trident Sessions (1999)	Unreleased Tracks from Between Nothingness & Eternity (2011)

Professional ratings
Review scores
Source	Rating
All About Jazz	Favourable
AllMusic	3/5 stars
Sputnikmusic	4.5/5 stars
The Penguin Guide to Jazz Recordings	3/4 stars

The Lost Trident Sessions is a studio album by jazz fusion group the Mahavishnu Orchestra, released on 21 September 1999 through Sony Music Entertainment. It was originally recorded in June 1973 at Trident Studios but was not released until 26 years later. According to the album's detailed liner notes, in November 1998 Columbia Records producer Bob Belden stumbled upon two quarter-inch tapes in Columbia's Los Angeles vault whilst gathering material for a remastered reissue of the Mahavishnu Orchestra's 1973 album Birds of Fire. The tapes were otherwise unlabelled besides the recording location, but upon further inspection, they were revealed to be the two-track mixes for what would have been the Mahavishnu Orchestra's third studio album at the time.

Guitarist John McLaughlin told gig - The Music Magazine in 1977:

McLaughlin feels that the Orchestra was never recorded at their peak. "There is a studio album that never got released which is really good", he explains. It would have been their third studio album, following Inner Mounting Flame and Birds of Fire. "But at the time the record was being made, emotion in the band was running so high that people could no longer see clearly. Everyone felt nervous about it". Why? "I don't know why". And McLaughlin did not pursue it either: "When the people in the band told me how they felt, I respected it. I didn't ask them to explain why they felt it. That was enough. So we put a live album out (Between Nothingness and Eternity) which was good, but it wasn't on the same level. But one day I'd like the album to come out. It's a great album".

With the exception of "John's Song #2", all compositions on this album were performed on other albums. The Mahavishnu Orchestra's 1973 live album, Between Nothingness and Eternity, consisted entirely of songs from the Trident sessions: "Dream", "Trilogy" and "Sister Andrea." Violinist Jerry Goodman and keyboardist Jan Hammer performed "I Wonder" and "Steppings Tones" on their 1974 album Like Children.

== Track listing ==
No.	Title	Music	Length
1.	"Dream"	John McLaughlin	11:10
2.	"Trilogy": "The Sunlit Path"; "La Mere de la Mer"; "Tomorrow's Story Not the Same"	McLaughlin	9:33
3.	"Sister Andrea"	Jan Hammer	6:47
4.	"I Wonder"	Jerry Goodman	3:10
5.	"Steppings Tones"	Rick Laird	3:11
6.	"John's Song #2"	McLaughlin	5:53
Total length:			39:44

== Personnel ==
- John McLaughlin – guitar, production
- Jan Hammer – electric piano, synthesizer, production
- Billy Cobham – drums, production
- Jerry Goodman – electric violin, viola, violow (custom viola with cello strings), production
- Rick Laird – bass, production

Technical

- Ken Scott – engineering
- Mark Wilder – mastering
- Bob Belden – production

== Charts ==
Chart (1999)	Peak position
US Top Jazz Albums (Billboard)	4
