= Between Nothingness & Eternity =

Live album by The Mahavishnu Orchestra
- Released: November 1973
- Recorded: August 18, 1973
- Venues: Wollman Rink (Central Park, New York City)
- Genre: Jazz fusion
- Length: 42:24; 43:17 (2011 remix)
- Label: Columbia
- Producers: Murray Krugman; John McLaughlin

The Mahavishnu Orchestra chronology
| Birds of Fire (1973) | Between Nothingness & Eternity (1973) | Apocalypse (1974) |

John McLaughlin chronology
| Love Devotion Surrender (1973) | Between Nothingness & Eternity (1973) | Apocalypse (1974) |

Professional ratings
Review scores
| Source | Rating |
|---|---|
| Allmusic | 4/5 stars |
| Christgau's Record Guide | B+ |
| Sputnikmusic | 4/5 |
| All About Jazz | (favorable) |
| The Rolling Stone Jazz Record Guide | 3/5 stars |
| The Penguin Guide to Jazz Recordings | 3/4 stars |

Between Nothingness & Eternity is the first live album by jazz fusion band Mahavishnu Orchestra, released in November 1973 by Columbia Records. According to the Mahavishnu Orchestra Gigs listing by Walter Kolosky, it was recorded live at the Schaefer Music Festival, held in Central Park, New York, on August 17 and 18, 1973, even though available recordings indicate that all of the material from the album was taken from the second night only. Originally, Mahavishnu Orchestra's third album was to be a studio effort, recorded in June 1973 at Trident in London, but was scrapped during the final days of the project; the live album, containing versions of three of the original six tracks, was released instead as the last album during the period of the original line-up of the band. The original studio album was released in 1999 as The Lost Trident Sessions.

Between Nothingness & Eternity was included in 2011 as part of The Complete Columbia Albums Collection boxed set, along with the other albums by the first line-up of the band, including The Lost Trident Sessions. This new version was a new different mix with an additional minute of music on "Sister Andrea". The boxed set also contained an album called Unreleased Tracks from Between Nothingness & Eternity, which contains other selections from the two Central Park shows.

== Track listing ==
=== Original vinyl ===
Side one
| No. | Title | Music | Length |
|---|---|---|---|
| 1. | "Trilogy: Sunlit Path/La Mere de la Mer/Tomorrow's Story Not the Same" | John McLaughlin | 12:16 |
| 2. | "Sister Andrea" | Jan Hammer | 8:45 |

Side two
| No. | Title | Music | Length |
|---|---|---|---|
| 1. | "Dream" | McLaughlin | 21:24 |

=== "The Complete Columbia Albums Collection" version ===
| No. | Title | Music | Length |
|---|---|---|---|
| 1. | "Trilogy: Sunlit Path/La Mere de la Mer/Tomorrow's Story Not the Same" | | 12:03 |
| 2. | "Sister Andrea" | | 9:53 |
| 3. | "Dream" | McLaughlin | 21:22 |

== Personnel ==
- John McLaughlin - guitar
- Jan Hammer - keyboards
- Jerry Goodman - violin
- Rick Laird - bass
- Billy Cobham - drums, percussion

== Charts ==
| Chart (1974) | Peak position |
|---|---|
| Australian Albums (Kent Music Report) | 42 |
| Canada Top Albums/CDs (RPM) | 48 |
| US Billboard 200 | 41 |
