= Serenade to a Soul Sister =

Studio album by Horace Silver
- Released: Early June 1968
- Recorded: February 23 and March 29, 1968
- Studio: Van Gelder, Englewood Cliffs
- Genre: Jazz
- Length: 37:54
- Label: Blue Note; BST 84277
- Producer: Francis Wolff

Horace Silver chronology
The Jody Grind (1966)	Serenade to a Soul Sister (1968)	You Gotta Take a Little Love (1969)

Serenade to a Soul Sister is an album by jazz pianist Horace Silver, released on the Blue Note label in 1968 and featuring performances by Silver with Charles Tolliver, Stanley Turrentine, Bennie Maupin, Bob Cranshaw, John Williams, Mickey Roker and Billy Cobham.

The album was re-mastered, for the CD release in the 24-bit series, by Rudy Van Gelder, in 2004.

== Silver's guidelines to musical composition ==
The album's liner notes include Silver's guidelines to musical composition:

a. Melodic Beauty
b. Meaningful Simplicity
c. Harmonic Beauty
d. Rhythm
e. Environmental, Hereditary, Regional, and Spiritual Influences

== Reception ==
Professional ratings
Review scores
Source	Rating
AllMusic	4.5/5 stars
DownBeat	4/5 stars
The Penguin Guide to Jazz	3/4 stars
The Rolling Stone Jazz Record Guide	3/5 stars

AllMusic writer Steve Huey stated:

One of the last great Horace Silver albums for Blue Note, Serenade to a Soul Sister is also one of the pianist's most infectiously cheerful, good-humored outings... You'd never know this album was recorded in one of the most tumultuous years in American history, but as Silver says in the liner notes' indirect jab at the avant-garde, he simply didn't believe in allowing 'politics, hatred, or anger' into his music. Whether you agree with that philosophy or not, it's hard to argue with musical results as joyous and tightly performed as Serenade to a Soul Sister.

== Track listing ==
All compositions by Horace Silver.

1. "Psychedelic Sally" – 7:14
2. "Serenade to a Soul Sister" – 6:19
3. "Rain Dance" – 6:21
4. "Jungle Juice" – 6:46
5. "Kindred Spirits" – 5:55
6. "Next Time I Fall in Love" – 5:19

== Personnel ==
Musicians on tracks 1 – 3 (February 23, 1968)

- Horace Silver – piano
- Charles Tolliver – trumpet
- Stanley Turrentine – tenor saxophone
- Bob Cranshaw – bass, electric bass (on track 1)
- Mickey Roker – drums

on tracks 4 – 6 (March 29, 1968)

- Horace Silver – piano
- Charles Tolliver – trumpet (exc. track 6)
- Bennie Maupin – tenor saxophone (exc. track 6)
- John Williams – bass
- Billy Cobham – drums

Production

- Francis Wolff – production
- Rudy Van Gelder – engineering
- Forlenza Venosa Associates – design
- Billy Cobham (Cover), Francis Wolff (Interior) – photography
