= Jerry Goodman =

American violinist (born 1949)

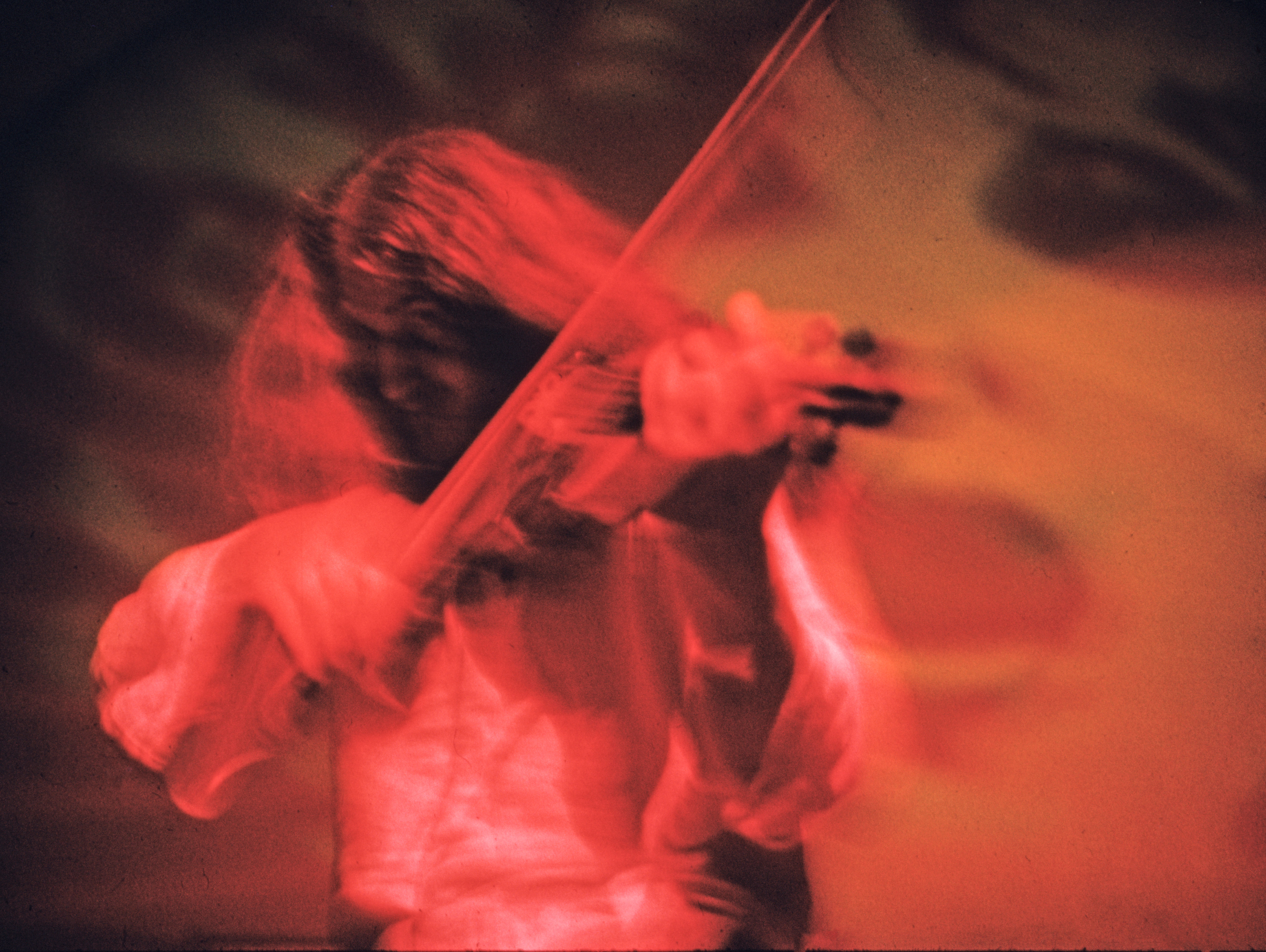
Goodman performing in London in 1970

Jerry Goodman (born March 16, 1949) is an American violinist known for playing electric violin with The Flock and the jazz fusion ensemble Mahavishnu Orchestra.

== Career ==
Jerry Goodman was born in Chicago, Illinois, United States. His parents were both members of the string section of the Chicago Symphony Orchestra, and his uncle was the noted composer and jazz pianist Marty Rubenstein. Jerry was trained in a conservatory before he began his musical career as The Flock's roadie and subsequently as a violinist.

After his 1971 appearance on John McLaughlin's album My Goal's Beyond, he became a member of McLaughlin's original Mahavishnu Orchestra lineup until the band broke up in 1973, and was viewed as a soloist of equal virtuosity to McLaughlin, keyboardist Jan Hammer and drummer Billy Cobham.

In 1974, after Mahavishnu, Goodman and Mahavishnu alum Hammer released the jazz fusion album Like Children. Starting in 1985 he recorded three solo albums for Private Music—On the Future of Aviation, Ariel, and the live album It's Alive with collaborators including Fred Simon and Jim Hines—and went on tour with his own band, as well as with Shadowfax and The Dixie Dregs. He scored Lily Tomlin's The Search for Signs of Intelligent Life in the Universe and is the featured violinist on numerous film soundtracks, including Billy Crystal's Mr. Saturday Night and Steve Martin's Dirty Rotten Scoundrels. His violin can be heard on more than fifty albums from artists ranging from Toots Thielemans to Hall & Oates to Styx to Jordan Rudess to Choking Ghost to Derek Sherinian. Goodman has appeared on four of Sherinian's solo records—Inertia (2001), Black Utopia (2003), Mythology (2004), and Blood of the Snake (2006)

In 1993, Goodman joined the American instrumental band, The Dixie Dregs, fronted by guitarist Steve Morse. Goodman appeared on one studio recording Full Circle (1994), and the live album "California Screamin'" (2000). In 1996, session violist and producer Ray Tischer featured Goodman on the award-winning CD Canciones del Sol/Britt Bossa Orchestra on Tischer's original instrumental "Toca del Angel".

After an absence from the public eye in live concert, he toured in 2004 and 2005 with Gary Husband in his group Gary Husband’s Force Majeure, and appeared on the DVD Gary Husband's Force Majeure - Live at the Queen Elizabeth Hall. Even more recently, he played with the San Diego–based fusion group Hectic Watermelon and with Dream Theater in their album Black Clouds & Silver Linings. Goodman has also been a part of Billy Cobham's Spectrum 40 tour.

== Discography ==
As leader

- 1985 – On the Future of Aviation
- 1986 – Ariel
- 1987 – It's Alive
- 2016 – Violin Fantasy

With The Flock

- 1969 – The Flock
- 1970 – Dinosaur Swamps

With Mahavishnu Orchestra 1971–1974: First incarnation: Jerry Goodman, John McLaughlin, Jan Hammer, Rick Laird, Billy Cobham

- 1971 – The Inner Mounting Flame
- 1973 – Birds of Fire
- 1973 – Between Nothingness and Eternity
- 1980 – The Best of Mahavishnu Orchestra
- 1999 – The Lost Trident Sessions
- 2011 – Unreleased Tracks from Between Nothingness & Eternity

With Jan Hammer

- 1974 – Like Children

With John McLaughlin

- 1971 – My Goal's Beyond
- 1979 – Electric Guitarist

With Dixie Dregs

- 1994 – Full Circle
- 2000 – California Screamin'

With Howard Levy, Oteil Burbridge, and Steve Smith

- 1999 – The Stranger's Hand

As a guest artist

- 1992 – Dave Uhrich by Dave Uhrich
- 1994 – Fret-no-tized by Dave Uhrich
- 1994 – El nervio del volcán by Caifanes
- 1995 – Canciones del Sol violinist Ray Tischer's the Britt Bossa Orchestra
- 1996 - Friend of the Moon (album) Jerry appears on two tracks of San Diego based singer/songwriter, John Katchur's album.
- 1998 – Standing 8 with Choking Ghost
- 1999 – Encores, Legends & Paradox, A Tribute To The Music OF ELP – Various Artists – (Jerry Goodman, Peter Banks, Igor Khoroshev, John Wetton, Simon Phillips, Robert Berry, Marc Bonilla, Jordan Rudess) Magna Carta – MAX-9026-2
- 1999 – Brave New World by Styx
- 2001 – Amazing Ordinary Things by Anne McCue
- 2005 – Visions Of An Inner Mounting Apocalypse: A Fusion Guitar Tribute - Tone Center – TC 40402
- 2007 – School of the Arts – School of the Arts (featuring T Lavitz, Steve Morse, Frank Gambale, Dave Weckl, John Patitucci) Goodman contributes violin work on 3 tracks, "No Time Flat" "Like This" and "Dinosaur Dance"
- 2009 –Black Clouds & Silver Linings by Dream Theater
- 2009 – A Tribute To Zbigniew Seifert – Jarek Śmietana Band (featuring Mateusz Smoczyński, Didier Lockwood, Krzesimir Dębski, Christian Howes, Mark Feldman, Maciej Strzelczyk, Adam Bałdych, Pierre Blanchard: JSR Records – JSR 0011)
- 2018 – Night Manager – Strat Andriotis
- 2019 – 1000 Hands: Chapter One – Jon Anderson
- 2020 – Remember Me At Twilight – Strat Andriotis
- 2021 – Path To Light – Denis Krupin

== Multimedia ==
- Jerry Goodman with the Mahavishnu Orchestra - "You Know You Know" on YouTube
- Jerry Goodman with The Flock (Duet, 1970) on YouTube
- Jerry Goodman with the Dixie Dregs on YouTube
- Video introduction from Jerry Goodman website on YouTube
- L.A. Underscore with Jerry Goodman on YouTube

== Sources and external links ==
- Mahavishnu Orchestra The Inner Mounting Flame CD booklet
- Mahavishnu Orchestra The Lost Trident Sessions CD booklet
- All Music Guide to Jerry Goodman
- 2010 interview with Jerry Goodman on Prog Sphere
