= You Gotta Take a Little Love =

Studio album by The Horace Silver Quintet
- Released: Early June 1969
- Recorded: January 10 & 17, 1969; Van Gelder Studio, Englewood Cliffs
- Genre: Jazz
- Length: 39:06
- Label: Blue Note; BST 84309
- Producer: Francis Wolff

Horace Silver chronology
Serenade to a Soul Sister (1968)	You Gotta Take a Little Love (1969)	That Healin' Feelin' (1970)

Professional ratings
Review scores
Source	Rating
AllMusic	4/5 stars

You Gotta Take a Little Love is an album by jazz pianist Horace Silver released on the Blue Note label in 1969, featuring performances by Silver with Randy Brecker, Bennie Maupin, John Williams, and Billy Cobham. The AllMusic review awarded the album four stars.

== Track listing ==
All compositions by Horace Silver except as indicated

1. "You Gotta Take a Little Love" - 5:24
2. "The Risin' Sun" - 4:37
3. "It's Time" - 6:42
4. "Lovely's Daughter" (Bennie Maupin) - 4:14
5. "Down and Out" - 4:30
6. "The Belly Dancer" - 7:25
7. "Brain Wave" - 6:14

Recorded on January 10 (1, 2, 4), and 17 (3, 5-7), 1969.

== Personnel ==
- Horace Silver – piano
- Randy Brecker – trumpet, flugelhorn, except 4
- Bennie Maupin – tenor saxophone, flute on 4, 6
- John Williams – bass
- Billy Cobham – drums
