= Uptown Conversation =

Studio album by Ron Carter
- Released: 1970
- Recorded: October 6 & 7, 1969
- Studio: A&R Recording Studio, New York City
- Genre: Jazz
- Length: 57:02 CD reissue with bonus tracks
- Label: Embryo SD 521
- Producer: Herbie Mann

Ron Carter chronology
Where? (1961)	Uptown Conversation (1970)	Alone Together (1972)

Reissue Cover

Uptown Conversation is the second album led by the jazz double bass player Ron Carter, recorded in 1969 and first released on the Embryo label.

== Reception ==
Professional ratings
Review scores
Source	Rating
Allmusic	4.5/5 stars
The Rolling Stone Jazz Record Guide	4/5 stars
The Penguin Guide to Jazz Recordings	3/4 stars

The Allmusic review by Michael G. Nastos said, "Ron Carter's Uptown Conversation may very well be the most intriguing, challenging, and resonant statement of many he has made over the years as a leader ...Considering the music Ron Carter played preceding and following this effort, you'd be hard-pressed to find a more diverse, intellectually stimulating, enlivened, and especially unrestricted musical statement in his long and enduring career."

== Track listing ==
All compositions by Ron Carter

1. "Uptown Conversation" - 6:06
2. "Ten Strings" - 5:35
3. "Half a Row" - 10:13
4. "R.J." - 2:46
5. "Little Waltz" - 8:29
6. "Einbahnstrasse" (aka First trip) - 8:04
7. "Doom" - 7:07
8. "Einbahnstrasse" [Alternate Take] - 7:15 Bonus track on CD reissue
9. "Doom" [Alternate Take] - 6:34 Bonus track on CD reissue

== Personnel ==
- Ron Carter — electric bass, double bass
- Hubert Laws — flute (tracks 1, 4 & 5)
- Herbie Hancock — piano, electric piano (all tracks except 2)
- Sam Brown — guitar (tracks 1, 2 & 4)
- Grady Tate (tracks 1, 4 & 5), Billy Cobham (tracks 3, 6, & 7) — drums
