= Observations & Reflections =

Studio album by Billy Cobham
- Released: 1982
- Studio: Normandy Recording Studios, Warren, Rhode Island
- Genre: Jazz fusion
- Label: Elektra/Musician
- Producer: Billy Cobham

Observations & Reflections is a studio album by jazz fusion drummer Billy Cobham, released in 1982 on the Elektra/Musician label. The album rose to No. 25 on the Billboard Top Jazz LPs chart.

== Overview ==
Observations & Reflections was produced by Billy Cobham.

== Covers ==
Cobham covered "Take It To The Sky" by Earth, Wind & Fire which came off the band's 1980 album Faces.

== Critical reception ==
Professional ratings
Review scores
| Source | Rating |
|---|---|
| AllMusic | 3/5 stars |
| Billboard | (favourable) |
| Detroit Free Press | (favourable) |

The album was released to favorable reviews, and continued to gain momentum through the years.

== Tracklisting ==
=== Side One ===
| No. | Title | Writer(s) | Length |
|---|---|---|---|
| 1. | "Jailbait" | Tim Landers | 5:10 |
| 2. | "M.S.R" | Dean Brown | 5:22 |
| 3. | "Arroyo" | Billy Cobham | 7:56 |

=== Side Two ===
| No. | Title | Writer(s) | Length |
|---|---|---|---|
| 4. | "Chiquita Linda" | Gil Goldstein | 5:56 |
| 5. | "Take It To The Sky" | Garry Glenn, Larry Dunn, Maurice White | 4:11 |
| 6. | "Observations & Reflections" | Billy Cobham | 10:03 |

== Musicians ==
- Dean Brown - guitar
- Bill Cobham - drums
- Gil Goldstein - keyboards
- Tim Landers - bass
