= The Inner Mounting Flame =

Studio album by Mahavishnu Orchestra
- Released: November 3, 1971
- Recorded: August 14, 1971
- Studio: CBS Studios (New York City)
- Genre: Jazz fusion; progressive rock
- Length: 46:15
- Label: Columbia
- Producer: John McLaughlin

Mahavishnu Orchestra chronology
The Inner Mounting Flame (1971)	Birds of Fire (1973)

Professional ratings
Review scores
Source	Rating
AllMusic	5/5 stars
Christgau's Record Guide	A
The Rolling Stone Jazz Record Guide	5/5 stars
Sputnikmusic	5/5
The Penguin Guide to Jazz Recordings	4/4 stars

The Inner Mounting Flame is the debut studio album by jazz-rock fusion band Mahavishnu Orchestra, recorded in August 1971 and released later that year by Columbia Records. After their formation, the group performed several gigs before they entered the studio to record their first album featuring all original material written by guitarist John McLaughlin. The album is credited to both Mahavishnu Orchestra and John McLaughlin.

== Release and reception ==
The Inner Mounting Flame was released in 1971. Reviewing the album for JazzTimes in 1998, Bill Milkowski said:

One is struck by the grandiose reach of the quintet that dared to call itself an orchestra. Pieces like "Meeting of the Spirits" and the fragile, acoustic "A Lotus on Irish Streams" are like classically-inspired suites in miniature. But it was numbers like "Noonward Race", "Vital Transformation" and especially "Awakening", fueled by Cobham’s smoldering intensity on the kit and McLaughlin’s raging, distortion-soaked guitar lines, that really grabbed rock crowds. More ethereal pieces like "The Dance of Maya", with its odd time signatures and arpeggios, and the haunting "You Know, You Know", a drum feature for Cobham, helped to create a kind of mystique about the Mahavishnu Orchestra that was wholly unprecedented for its time.

In a retrospective review for Allmusic, Richard S. Ginell wrote that The Inner Mounting Flame "is the album that made John McLaughlin a semi-household name, a furious, high-energy, yet rigorously conceived meeting of virtuosos that, for all intents and purposes, defined the fusion of jazz and rock a year after Miles Davis' Bitches Brew breakthrough".

== Later releases ==
A remastered version of the album, on CD, was released in 1998 by Sony Music Entertainment. It features a facsimile of the LP front cover, a new set of liner notes by Bob Belden, and many photographs of the band. The Inner Mounting Flame was included in 2011 as part of The Complete Columbia Albums Collection box set, along with the other albums by the first line-up of the band, including The Lost Trident Sessions. This version includes a version of "The Noonward Race" recorded live at the Mar y Sol Pop Festival 3 April 1972. That version was previously available on the compilation album Mar Y Sol: The First International Puerto Rico Pop Festival, but the version included in the box set is two minutes longer.

== Track listing ==
All tracks composed by John McLaughlin.

Side one
No.	Title	Length
1.	"Meeting of the Spirits"	6:52
2.	"Dawn"	5:10
3.	"The Noonward Race"	6:28
4.	"A Lotus on Irish Streams"	5:39

Side two
No.	Title	Length
1.	"Vital Transformation"	6:16
2.	"The Dance of Maya"	7:17
3.	"You Know You Know"	5:07
4.	"Awakening"	3:32

2011 remaster bonus track
No.	Title	Length
9.	"Noonward Race (live)"	15:03

== Personnel ==
=== Mahavishnu Orchestra ===
- John McLaughlin – guitar
- Rick Laird – bass
- Billy Cobham – drums, percussion
- Jan Hammer – keyboards, organ
- Jerry Goodman – violin

=== Additional personnel ===
- Don Puluse – engineer

== Charts ==
Chart (1972)	Peak position
US Billboard 200	89
US Top Jazz Albums (Billboard)	11
