= Assembly Hall (Hunter College) =

Performance venue in New York, United States

Coordinates: 40.767824°N 73.964534°W

The Assembly Hall is a 2,079-capacity performance venue located on the campus of Hunter College in Manhattan, New York City. The theater is mostly used for graduation ceremonies, large symposiums, or performances by the college's orchestra. The New York Philharmonic played at the hall while David Geffen Hall was considering undergoing renovations. The venue has hosted many notable music acts such as Pink Floyd, The Doors and Frank Sinatra.
