= Birds of Fire =

Studio album by Mahavishnu Orchestra
- Released: January 19, 1973
- Recorded: August 1972
- Studios: CBS, New York; Trident, London
- Genre: Jazz fusion
- Length: 39:53
- Label: Columbia/CBS
- Producer: Mahavishnu Orchestra

Mahavishnu Orchestra chronology
The Inner Mounting Flame (1971)	Birds of Fire (1973)	Between Nothingness & Eternity (1973)

John McLaughlin chronology
The Inner Mounting Flame (1971)	Birds of Fire (1973)	Love Devotion Surrender (1973)

"Birds of Fire"
Sample of the title track

Birds of Fire is the second studio album by jazz fusion band the Mahavishnu Orchestra. It was released in 1973 by Columbia Records and is the last studio album released by the original line-up before it dissolved.

As with the group's previous album, The Inner Mounting Flame, Birds of Fire consists solely of compositions by John McLaughlin. These include the track "Miles Beyond (Miles Davis)", which McLaughlin dedicated to his friend and former bandleader.

The back cover of the album features the poem "Revelation" by Sri Chinmoy.

The track "Birds of Fire" was nominated for the 1974 Grammy for Best Pop Instrumental Performance.

== Release history ==
In addition to the standard two-channel stereo album there was also a four-channel quadraphonic version released in 1973 on LP and 8-track tape. The quad LP was encoded in the SQ matrix format.

The first CD issue was in 1986. A remastered version of the album was released on CD in 2000 by Sony Music Entertainment. It features a new set of liner notes by JazzTimes critic Bill Milkowski, as well as photographs of the band. In 2015 the album was re-issued on Super Audio CD by Audio Fidelity containing both the stereo and quad mixes. The same content was re-issued on SACD in Japan in 2021 by Sony Music.

The track "Celestial Terrestrial Commuters" appears on the six-CD box set Jazz: The Smithsonian Anthology, released by Smithsonian Folkways in 2011, covering the history of jazz.

== Reception ==
Professional ratings
Review scores
Source	Rating
AllMusic	5/5 stars
Christgau's Record Guide	A−
The Penguin Guide to Jazz Recordings	3.5/4 stars
The Rolling Stone Jazz Record Guide	5/5 stars
Sputnikmusic	5/5

Reviewing the album for All About Jazz in 2002, Walter Kolosky wrote of the title track:

"Birds of Fire," which opens up the album, is a fusion classic. John McLaughlin scares the hell out of his guitar with his melodic convulsions. If you ever want to frighten a musical neophyte, turn your stereo up really loud and play the cover tune – it's guaranteed to send him or her fleeing.

== Track listing ==
All tracks composed by John McLaughlin.

Side one
No.	Title	Length
1.	"Birds of Fire"	5:50
2.	"Miles Beyond" (dedicated to Miles Davis)	4:47
3.	"Celestial Terrestrial Commuters"	2:54
4.	"Sapphire Bullets of Pure Love"	0:24
5.	"Thousand Island Park"	3:23
6.	"Hope"	1:59

Side two
No.	Title	Length
7.	"One Word"	9:57
8.	"Sanctuary"	5:05
9.	"Open Country Joy"	3:56
10.	"Resolution"	2:09

== Personnel ==
=== Musicians ===
- John McLaughlin – guitars
- Rick Laird – bass
- Billy Cobham – drums, percussion
- Jan Hammer – keyboards, Moog synthesizer, Fender Rhodes
- Jerry Goodman – violin

=== Technical ===
- Ken Scott, Jim Green – audio engineer
- Ashok (Chris Poisson) – album design
- Pranavananda – photography

== Charts ==
Chart (1973)	Peak position
Australian Albums (Kent Music Report)	38
Canada Top Albums/CDs (RPM)	5
Finnish Albums (The Official Finnish Charts)	16
German Albums (Offizielle Top 100)	29
Norwegian Albums (VG-lista)	18
UK Albums (Official Charts)	20
US Billboard 200	15

== Certifications ==
Region	Certification	Certified units/sales
United States (RIAA)	Gold	500,000^{^}
^{^} Shipments figures based on certification alone.
