= Mahavishnu Orchestra =

American jazz fusion band

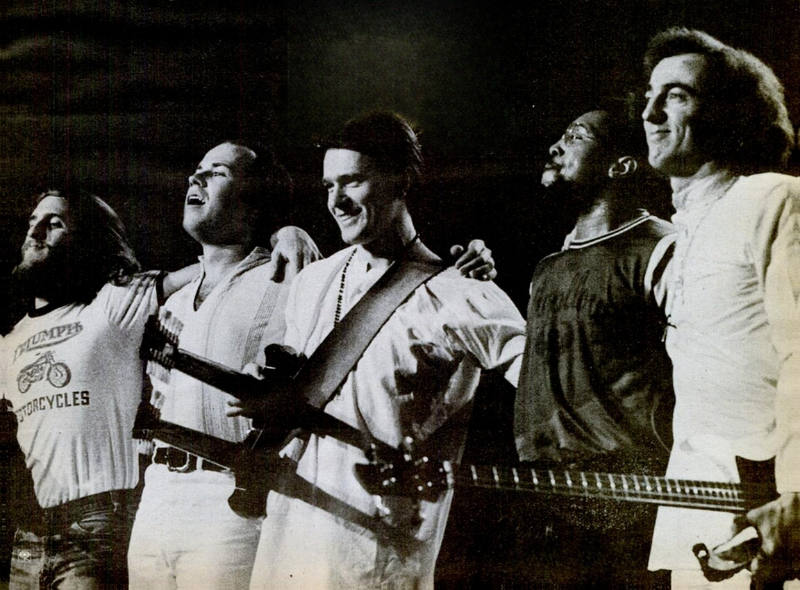
- The original line-up on stage in 1973. Left to right: Jerry Goodman, Jan Hammer, John McLaughlin, Billy Cobham, Rick Laird

Background information
- Origin: New York City, U.S.
- Genres: Jazz fusion; progressive rock; world jazz
- Years active: 1971–1976; 1984–1987
- Label: Columbia
- Past members: John McLaughlin; Billy Cobham; Jan Hammer; Jerry Goodman; Rick Laird; Ralphe Armstrong; Narada Michael Walden; Gayle Moran; Jean-Luc Ponty; Stu Goldberg; Bill Evans; Jonas Hellborg; Mitchel Forman; Danny Gottlieb; Jim Beard

The Mahavishnu Orchestra was a jazz fusion band formed in New York City in 1971, led by English guitarist John McLaughlin. The group underwent several line-up changes throughout its history across its two periods of activity, from 1971 to 1976 and from 1984 to 1987. With its first line-up consisting of McLaughlin, drummer Billy Cobham, keyboardist Jan Hammer, violinist Jerry Goodman and bassist Rick Laird, the band received acclaim for its complex, intense music consisting of a blend of Indian classical music, jazz, and psychedelic rock as well as its dynamic live performances between 1971 and 1973. Many members of the band have gone on to acclaimed careers of their own in the jazz and jazz-fusion genres.

== History ==
=== 1971–1974: First incarnation ===
By mid-1971, McLaughlin had been a member of Miles Davis' band and Tony Williams' Lifetime, and released three solo albums. He then set about forming his own jazz fusion group, the first line-up of which featured Panamanian drummer Cobham, Irish bassist Laird, Czech keyboardist Hammer and American violinist Goodman. Cobham and Goodman had played on McLaughlin's third solo album My Goal's Beyond (1971). McLaughlin's first choice for violinist was Frenchman Jean-Luc Ponty, but he was unable to join due to immigration problems. After listening to various albums he hired Goodman, formerly of the Flock. Though American bassist Tony Levin was the first person McLaughlin wanted, Laird had known McLaughlin for several years and accepted the invitation. Hammer was found through a mutual friendship with Miroslav Vitouš of the jazz fusion group Weather Report. The group's name originates from Indian spiritual leader and guru Sri Chinmoy, of whom McLaughlin had become a follower, who gave him the name Mahavishnu, "Maha" meaning "great" in Sanskrit and "vishnu" after the Hindu deity Vishnu.

With the line-up secured, the five met in New York City in July 1971 and rehearsed for one week. They adopted an instrumental fusion sound characterised by electric rock, funk, complex time signatures, and arrangements influenced by McLaughlin's interest in Indian classical music. Their debut gigs followed at the Gaslight at the Au Go Go as the opening act for bluesman John Lee Hooker. McLaughlin recalled: "The first set was shaky but the second set just took off and every night it was great. They wanted to hold us over and a few days after the second week ... we went into the studio". McLaughlin secured a record deal with Columbia Records, giving the green light to record an album.

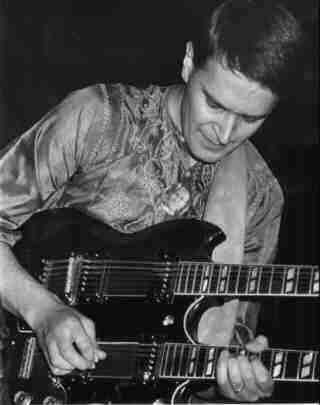
McLaughlin in 1973 performing with the band

The Inner Mounting Flame was released in November 1971, peaking at No. 11 on the Billboard Jazz Albums and No. 89 on the Billboard 200. This was followed by Birds of Fire (1973) which peaked at No. 15 on the Billboard 200. Due to the pressures of sudden fame, exhaustion and a lack of communication, the original band began to tire. The stress was further exacerbated by problematic recording sessions in June 1973 at London's Trident Studios that found some of the players not speaking to others. Their project was never fully completed. Cobham was disappointed and felt that the group "were knocking on the door of something really new. Something unique, something that had never been done before in rock and roll." This was followed by the release of their first live album Between Nothingness & Eternity, which featured material from the Trident sessions.

Later in 1973, Hammer and Goodman expressed their frustrations with McLaughlin's leadership in an interview for Crawdaddy magazine. An attempt was made to improve group relations by having each member introduced as they walked on stage, and tunes by Hammer, Laird, and Goodman mixed into the live set. It was not enough, however, and the five played their final gig on December 30. According to Laird, the band did not say goodbye to each other afterward. In January 1974, McLaughlin split the group. Laird spoke about the group weeks later, claiming that despite McLaughlin's having composed most of the group's tunes, the rest of the band contributed "a great deal" and did not receive credit. He was also critical of Cobham's claim that the group had rejected his musical ideas, and that Hammer, Goodman, and Laird pushed to have their songs performed because of "an ego trip".

=== 1974–1976: Second incarnation ===
After the original group dissolved, it reformed in 1974 with a new cast of musicians behind McLaughlin: Jean-Luc Ponty (who had performed with Frank Zappa and the Mothers of Invention) on violin, Gayle Moran on keyboards, Ralphe Armstrong on bass guitar and Narada Michael Walden on drums, Steve Kindler and Carol Shive on violins, Marcia Westbrook on viola, Phil Hirschi on cello, Steve Frankevich, Premik Russell Tubbs on alto, tenor and soprano saxophones, and Bob Knapp on brass. This "new", expanded Mahavishnu Orchestra (which McLaughlin has reportedly called the "real" Mahavishnu Orchestra) changed personnel slightly between 1974's Apocalypse and Visions of the Emerald Beyond in 1975. Apocalypse was recorded in London with the London Symphony Orchestra under the direction of Michael Tilson Thomas, with George Martin producing and Geoff Emerick engineering the sessions. The band was then reduced to a four-piece for 1976's Inner Worlds, with Jean-Luc Ponty leaving after a heated disagreement about writing credits on the Visions album (one of Ponty's compositions, Pegasus, was mistakenly credited to John McLaughlin), and Gayle Moran being replaced with Stu Goldberg. Ponty would later settle over the royalties for the tracks Pegasus and Opus 1 for an undisclosed amount of money.

=== 1984–1987: Third incarnation ===
After the dissolution of this version of the Orchestra, McLaughlin formed another group called Shakti to explore his interest in Indian music; following that, he went on to form other bands including the One Truth Band and the Translators, and a guitar trio with Al Di Meola and flamenco guitarist Paco de Lucía.

In 1984, McLaughlin reformed the Mahavishnu Orchestra with Bill Evans on saxophones, Jonas Hellborg on bass, Mitchel Forman on keyboards, and original member Billy Cobham on drums. Cobham participated in the sessions for their self-titled 1984 album, but was replaced by Danny Gottlieb for live work, and Jim Beard replaced Mitchel Forman for the latter period of this band's life. This band's overall sound was different from the original Mahavishnu Orchestra, in particular because of McLaughlin's extensive use of the Synclavier synthesizer system.

=== Post-Mahavishnu Orchestra ===
McLaughlin then worked with a number of incarnations of the John McLaughlin Guitar Trio, all of which featured Trilok Gurtu on percussion, and, at various times, Jeff Berlin, Kai Eckhardt, and Dominique Di Piazza on bass. He then formed the Free Spirits, a guitar, organ and drums trio, with Joey DeFrancesco on Hammond organ and trumpet, and Dennis Chambers on drums, as well as touring and recording again with Al Di Meola and Paco de Lucía.

In 2017, McLaughlin headlined the Meeting of the Spirits Tour with his band, The 4th Dimension, and Jimmy Herring's band, the Invisible Whip. The 4th Dimension featured McLaughlin, guitar; Gary Husband, keyboards and drums; Etienne M'Bappe, bass; and Ranjit Barat, drums and vocals. The Invisible Whip featured Herring, guitar; Jeff Sipe, drums; Matt Slocum, Hammond B3 and clavinet; Jason Crosby, violin and Fender Rhodes; and Kevin Scott, bass. The two bands typically would jam for the closing third set of concerts. They collaborated to record an album entitled Live in San Francisco at The Warfield in San Francisico on December 8, 2017. The tracks were all Mahavishnu pieces from the 1970's.

Billy Cobham went on to perform as a solo artist, recording many albums including Total Eclipse, Crosswinds and Spectrum, and toured with the "Billy Cobham & George Duke Band" for many years. Jan Hammer went on to collaborate with Jeff Beck (together with Narada Michael Walden) in Beck's acclaimed album Wired and also recorded a live album with Beck. He released several solo albums and composed the theme and incidental music for the hit 1980s TV show Miami Vice. Jerry Goodman recorded the album Like Children with Mahavishnu keyboard alumnus Jan Hammer. Starting in 1985 he recorded three solo albums for Private Music and went on tour with his own band, as well as with Shadowfax and the Dixie Dregs. Rick Laird played with Stan Getz and Chick Corea as well as releasing one solo LP, Soft Focus, but retired from the music business in 1982. He worked both as a bass teacher and photographer since then. He died on July 4, 2021, at the age of 80.

== Legacy ==
Mahavishnu Orchestra has been cited as an influence on many bands of different genres. Greg Ginn, guitarist and main composer of hardcore punk band Black Flag, cited their early records which inspired him to record more progressive guitar work and even record instrumental albums. There has been a resurgence of interest in the Mahavishnu Orchestra in recent years, with bands like The Mars Volta, Opeth, Black Midi,The Fierce and the Dead, and the Dillinger Escape Plan, naming them as an influence. Jon Fishman, drummer for Phish, has also cited them as an influence. There have been no fewer than five major tribute recordings released. In addition, a book Power, Passion and Beauty: The Story of the Legendary Mahavishnu Orchestra by Walter Kolosky (AbstractLogix Books) has been published. It contains interviews with all of the band's members and quotes obtained specifically for the book from many famous admirers such as Jeff Beck, Pat Metheny, the artist Peter Max, Bill Bruford and many more. The Mahavishnu Orchestra have also been sampled in contemporary music, most notably by Massive Attack on their track "Unfinished Sympathy", which sampled "Planetary Citizen", resulting in the band's being sued by Ralphe Armstrong, who received a healthy out-of-court settlement. "You Know, You Know" was sampled on Massive Attack's "One Love" and Mos Def's "Kalifornia."

== Band members ==
| Image | Name | Years active | Instruments | Release contributions |
|---|---|---|---|---|
| | John McLaughlin | 1971–1976; 1984–1987 | guitar; vocals | all releases |
| | Billy Cobham | 1971–1973; 1984 | drums | The Inner Mounting Flame (1971); Birds of Fire (1973); Between Nothingness & Eternity (1973); Mahavishnu (1984); The Lost Trident Sessions (1999); Unreleased Tracks from Between Nothingness & Eternity (2011) |
| | Jerry Goodman | 1971–1973 | violin | The Inner Mounting Flame (1971); Birds of Fire (1973); Between Nothingness & Eternity (1973); The Lost Trident Sessions (1999); Unreleased Tracks from Between Nothingness & Eternity (2011) |
| | Jan Hammer | 1971–1973 | keyboards | The Inner Mounting Flame (1971); Birds of Fire (1973); Between Nothingness & Eternity (1973); The Lost Trident Sessions (1999); Unreleased Tracks from Between Nothingness & Eternity (2011) |
| | Rick Laird | 1971–1973 (died 2021) | bass guitar | The Inner Mounting Flame (1971); Birds of Fire (1973); Between Nothingness & Eternity (1973); The Lost Trident Sessions (1999); Unreleased Tracks from Between Nothingness & Eternity (2011) |
| | Ralphe Armstrong | 1974–1976 | bass guitar; vocals | Apocalypse (1974); Visions of the Emerald Beyond (1975); Inner Worlds (1976) |
| | Narada Michael Walden | 1974–1976 | drums; percussion; vocals; keyboards | Apocalypse (1974); Visions of the Emerald Beyond (1975); Inner Worlds (1976) |
| | Jean-Luc Ponty | 1974–1975 | violin; vocals | Apocalypse (1974); Visions of the Emerald Beyond (1975); Inner Worlds (1976) |
| | Gayle Moran | 1974–1975 | keyboards; vocals | Apocalypse (1974); Visions of the Emerald Beyond (1975) |
| | Stu Goldberg | 1975–1976 | keyboards; vocals | Inner Worlds (1976) |
| | Bill Evans | 1984–1987 | saxophone; keyboards | Mahavishnu (1984); Adventures in Radioland (1987) |
| | Jonas Hellborg | 1984–1987 | bass guitar | Mahavishnu (1984); Adventures in Radioland (1987) |
| | Mitchel Forman | 1984–1986 | keyboards | Mahavishnu (1984); Adventures in Radioland (1987) |
| | Danny Gottlieb | 1985–1986 | drums; percussion | Mahavishnu (1984); Adventures in Radioland (1987) |
| | Jim Beard | 1987 (died 2024) | keyboards | none |

=== Timeline ===
| Period | Line-up |
|---|---|
| 1971–1973 | John McLaughlin – guitar; Jan Hammer – keyboards; Jerry Goodman – violin; Rick Laird – bass guitar; Billy Cobham – drums |
| 1974–1975 | John McLaughlin – guitar; Gayle Moran – keyboards, vocals; Jean-Luc Ponty – violin; Ralphe Armstrong – bass guitar; Narada Michael Walden – drums, vocals |
| 1976 | John McLaughlin – guitar, vocals; Stu Goldberg – keyboards, vocals; Ralphe Armstrong – bass guitar, vocals; Narada Michael Walden – drums, vocals |
| 1976–1984 | Disbanded |
| 1984 | John McLaughlin – guitar; Mitchel Forman – keyboards; Bill Evans – saxophone; Jonas Hellborg – bass guitar; Billy Cobham – drums |
| 1985–1986 | John McLaughlin – guitar; Mitchel Forman – keyboards; Bill Evans – saxophone, keyboards; Jonas Hellborg – bass guitar; Danny Gottlieb – drums |
| 1987 | John McLaughlin – guitar; Jim Beard – keyboards; Bill Evans – saxophone, keyboards; Jonas Hellborg – bass guitar; Danny Gottlieb – drums |

== Discography ==
=== Studio albums ===
| Title | Album details | Peak chart positions | | | | | | Certifications |
| Title | Album details | US | US Jazz | AUS | GER | NOR | UK | Certifications |
|---|---|---|---|---|---|---|---|---|
| The Inner Mounting Flame | Released: November 3, 1971; Label: C.B.S., Columbia; Formats: CD, LP, digital download | 89 | 11 | — | — | — | — | |
| Birds of Fire | Released: January 19, 1973; Label: C.B.S., Columbia; Formats: CD, CS, LP, Q8, digital download | 15 | — | 38 | 29 | 18 | 20 | US: Gold |
| Apocalypse with London Symphony Orchestra | Released: March, 1974; Label: C.B.S., Columbia; Formats: CD, LP, Q8, digital download | 43 | 10 | 82 | — | — | — | |
| Visions of the Emerald Beyond | Released: February, 1975; Label: C.B.S., Columbia; Formats: CD, CS, LP, Q8, digital download | 68 | 18 | 74 | — | — | — | |
| Inner Worlds | Released: January, 1976; Label: C.B.S., Columbia; Formats: CD, CS, LP, Q8, digital download | 118 | 24 | — | — | — | — | |
| Mahavishnu | Released: October 8, 1984; Label: WEA Musik, Warner Bros.; Formats: CD, CS, LP | — | — | — | — | — | — | |
| Adventures in Radioland | Released: 1987; Label: Relativity, PolyGram; Formats: CD, LP, digital download | — | — | — | — | — | — | |
| The Lost Trident Sessions | Released: September 21, 1999; Label: Sony; Formats: CD, HDCD, digital download | — | — | — | — | — | — | |
"—" denotes a recording that did not chart or was not released in that territory.

=== Live albums ===
| Title | Album details | Peak chart positions | |
| Title | Album details | US | AUS |
|---|---|---|---|
| Between Nothingness & Eternity | Released: November, 1973; Label: C.B.S., Columbia; Formats: CD, LP, Q8, digital download | 41 | 42 |
| Unreleased Tracks from Between Nothingness & Eternity | Released: 2011; Label: C.B.S., Columbia; Formats: CD, digital download | — | — |

=== Compilations ===
| Title | Album details | Peak chart positions |
| Title | Album details | US |
|---|---|---|
| The Best of Mahavishnu Orchestra | Released: 1980; Label: Columbia, CBS; Formats: LP, CS, CD | |
| The Complete Columbia Albums Collection | Released: 2011; Label: Columbia, Sony; Formats: CD | |
| The Essential Mahavishnu Orchestra with John McLaughlin | Released: 2013; Label: Columbia, Sony; Formats: Digital download, streaming | |

== Sources ==
- Kolosky, Walter (2006). Power, Passion and Beauty: The Story of the Legendary Mahavishnu Orchestra
