= Billy Cobham =

Panamanian–American drummer (born 1944)

- Billy Cobham Time Machine at the 2026 Montreux Jazz Festival

Background information
- Born: William Emanuel Cobham Jr. May 16, 1944 (age 82); Colón, Panama
- Genres: Jazz; jazz fusion; jazz funk; progressive rock
- Occupations: Musician; songwriter; bandleader; educator
- Instruments: Drums, percussion
- Years active: 1968–present
- Labels: Atlantic; Columbia; CTI; Elektra; GRP
- Formerly of: Mahavishnu Orchestra; New York Jazz Quartet; Jazz Is Dead; Bobby and the Midnites
- Website: billy-cobham.com

William Emanuel Cobham Jr. (born May 16, 1944) is a Panamanian–American jazz drummer who came to prominence in the late 1960s and early 1970s with trumpeter Miles Davis and then with the Mahavishnu Orchestra.

Cobham was inducted into the Modern Drummer Hall of Fame in 1987, the Classic Drummer Hall of Fame in 2013., and The Percussive Arts Society Hall Of Fame in 2006, a very rare honour. AllMusic biographer Steve Huey said: "Generally acclaimed as fusion's greatest drummer, Billy Cobham's explosive technique powered some of the genre's most important early recordings – including groundbreaking efforts by Miles Davis and the Mahavishnu Orchestra – before he became an accomplished bandleader in his own right. At his best, Cobham harnessed his amazing dexterity into thundering, high-octane hybrids of jazz complexity and rock & roll aggression."

Cobham's influence stretched far beyond jazz; he influenced progressive rock contemporaries, including Bill Bruford of King Crimson, and later ones such as Danny Carey of Tool. Prince and Jeff Beck both played a version of Cobham's "Stratus" in concert. Phil Collins, who named the Mahavishnu Orchestra's The Inner Mounting Flame as a key influence on his early style, said: "Billy Cobham played some of the finest drumming I've ever heard on that record."

== Biography ==
Born in Colón, Panama, Cobham moved with his family to Brooklyn, New York, when he was three. His father, Manuel, worked as a hospital statistician during the week and played piano on weekends. Cobham started playing drums at the age of four, and joined his father four years later. When he was 15, he got his first drum kit as a gift after being accepted to The High School of Music & Art in New York City.

He was drafted in 1965, and played with a U.S. Army band for the next three years. After his discharge, he joined Horace Silver's quintet. He played an early model electric drum kit given to him by Tama Drums. He was a house drummer for Atlantic Records and a session musician for CTI and Kudu, appearing on the albums White Rabbit by George Benson, Sunflower by Milt Jackson, and Soul Box by Grover Washington Jr.

Cobham started the jazz rock group Dreams with Michael Brecker, Randy Brecker, Barry Rogers, and John Abercrombie. He moved further into jazz fusion when he recorded with Miles Davis, appearing on Davis's albums A Tribute to Jack Johnson and Big Fun. In 1971, he and guitarist John McLaughlin started the Mahavishnu Orchestra, another group that fused rock, funk, and jazz. Cobham toured extensively from 1971 to 1973 with the first incarnation of the Mahavishnu Orchestra, which released two studio albums, The Inner Mounting Flame (1971) and Birds of Fire (1973), and one live album, Between Nothingness & Eternity (1973). The studio versions of songs on the live album were released on The Lost Trident Sessions (1999).

Cobham's debut album, Spectrum (1973), surprised him and his record company when it reached No. 1 on the Billboard magazine Jazz Albums chart and No. 26 on the Top 200 Albums chart. Cobham started experimenting with different drum equipment. In 1974, for Crosswinds he used a fiberglass-shell snare built for him by Al Duffy, and used Duffy's custom chain-drive bass drum pedal. Cobham's massive drum kit in the mid-1970s, based on a clear acrylic set by Fibes Drums, contained two Fibes bass drums, a custom Duffy snare, two flared-shell rack toms by North Drums, four Fibes rack toms, two Fibes floor toms, two gong drums by Duffy customized by Cobham's drum roadie Jeff Ocheltree, a hi-hat, five Zildjian cymbals, and one hanging 36-inch gong. This expansive kit and Cobham's dynamic style influenced later drummers.

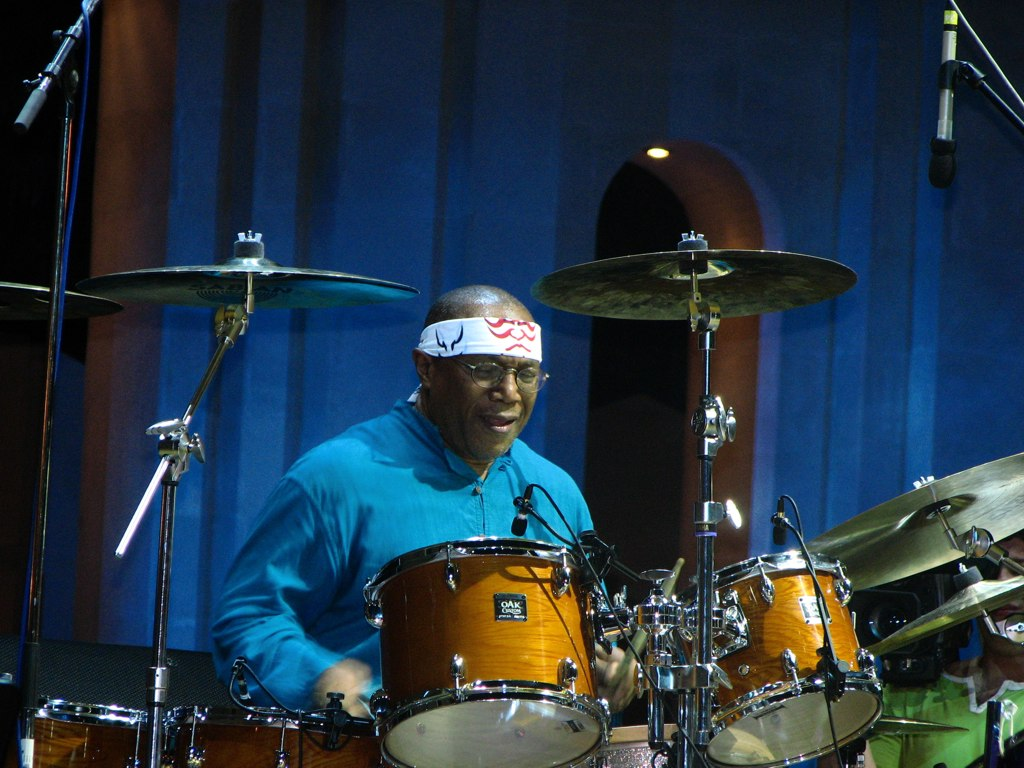
Baku Jazz Festival, 2007

In 1980, he worked with Jack Bruce in Jack Bruce & Friends. For this group, Cobham used a very large custom drum kit designed for him by Tama Drums, featuring three bass drums with linked pedals, and three snares including a piccolo snare and a Hinger Space Tone expanding snare. Cobham said this kit adapted to fit the music, and the music adapted to fit the kit – "a continual chicken–egg–chicken scenario." On October 30, 1980, he joined the Grateful Dead during the band's concert at Radio City Music Hall. He performed a long drum solo session with the band's two percussionists, Bill Kreutzmann and Mickey Hart, also known as the Rhythm Devils. In 1981, Billy Cobham's Glass Menagerie was formed with Michał Urbaniak on violin and EWI, Gil Goldstein on piano, Tim Landers on bass, and Mike Stern on guitar. Dean Brown replaced Stern when he left to play with Miles Davis. Glass Menagerie released two albums for Elektra Musician.

From 1980 to 1984, Cobham played in the band Bobby and the Midnites, a side project for Bob Weir of the Grateful Dead, with Bobby Cochran and Kenny Gradney, and recorded the album Where the Beat Meets the Street.

Cobham moved to Switzerland in 1985.

In 1994, he joined an all-star cast Greek Theatre in Los Angeles; the results appeared on the album Stanley Clarke, Larry Carlton, Billy Cobham, Najee and Deron Johnson Live at the Greek. The concert was predominantly Clarke's music, but all the musicians contributed material.

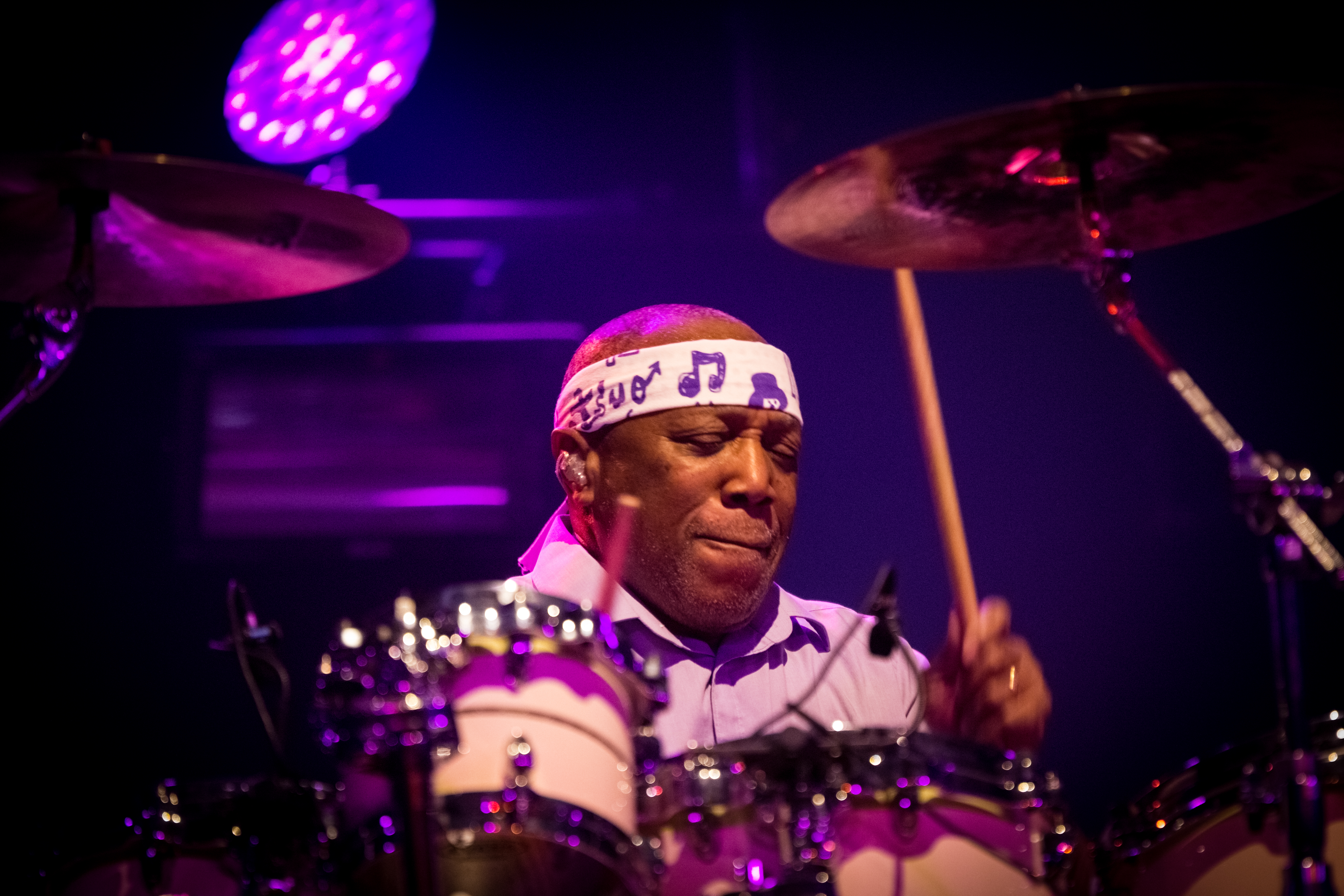
Cobham live at Leverkusener Jazztage (Germany) in 2016

In 2006, Cobham released Drum 'n' Voice 2, a return to the 1970s jazz-funk sound, with guests including Brian Auger, Guy Barker, Jeff Berlin, Frank Gambale, Jan Hammer, Mike Lindup, Buddy Miles, Dominic Miller, Airto Moreira, John Patitucci, and the band Novecento. The album was produced and arranged by Pino and Lino Nicolosi for Nicolosi Productions. In 2009, he released Drum'n' Voice 3. Guests included Alex Acuña, Brian Auger, George Duke, Chaka Khan, Bob Mintzer, Novecento, John Scofield, and Gino Vannelli.

Cobham plays his drums using the open-handed technique, which allows the player to play without crossing their right hand over the snare drum.

In December 2011, Cobham began teaching drums online at the Billy Cobham School of Drums, a school in the ArtistWorks Drum Academy.

== Praise from other musicians ==
Many musicians have cited Cobham as an influence, including Phil Collins, Tullio De Piscopo, Kenny Aronoff, Steve Arrington, Ranjit Barot, Danny Carey, Jimmy Chamberlin, Dennis Chambers, Brann Dailor, Matt Garstka, Chris Hornbrook, Thomas Lang, Mac McNeilly, OM, Opeth, Chris Pennie Mike Portnoy, Thomas Pridgen, Sivamani, Bill Stevenson, Jon Theodore, Tony Thompson, and Mike Clark. Other musicians have expressed admiration for his work, including Steven Wilson and Dave Bainbridge.

== Influences ==
Cobham has cited big-band drummers, such as Buddy Rich, Jo Jones, Louie Bellson, Sam Woodyard, Sonny Payne, Mel Lewis, and Charlie Persip, as well as modern jazz drummers, such as Tony Williams, Elvin Jones, Jimmy Cobb, Roy Haynes, Max Roach, and Art Blakey, as influences on his playing.

== Discography ==
=== As leader ===
- 1973 – Spectrum
- 1974 – Crosswinds
- 1974 – Total Eclipse
- 1975 – Shabazz
- 1975 – A Funky Thide of Sings
- 1976 – Life & Times
- 1976 – Live On Tour In Europe with George Duke
- 1977 – Magic
- 1978 – Inner Conflicts
- 1978 – Alivemutherforya
- 1978 – Simplicity of Expression: Depth of Thought
- 1979 – BC
- 1980 – Flight Time
- 1981 – Stratus
- 1982 – Observations & Reflections
- 1983 – Smokin'
- 1985 – Warning
- 1986 – Powerplay
- 1987 – Picture This
- 1989 – Incoming
- 1992 – By Design
- 1994 – The Traveler
- 1996 – Nordic
- 1998 – Focused
- 1999 – Off Color
- 2000 – North by Northwest
- 2001 – Drum & Voice 1 (All That Groove)
- 2002 – Culture Mix
- 2003 – The Art of Three
- 2006 – Art of Four
- 2006 – Drum & Voice – Vol.2
- 2007 – Fruit from the Loom
- 2008 – De Cuba y Panama
- 2009 – Drum & Voice – Vol.3
- 2010 – Palindrome
- 2014 – Tales From The Skeleton Coast
- 2015 – Ayajala Live
- 2015 – Spectrum 40 Live
- 2016 – Drum & Voice – Vol.4
- 2017 – Red Baron
- 2019 – Jon Anderson 1000 Hands Chapter One
- 2020 – Tierra Del Fuego
- 2021 – Robby Steinhardt Not in Kansas Anymore
- 2022 – Drum & Voice – Vol.5
- 2023 – Michael and Tim Franklin, Anahata
- 2024 – Drum 'N' Voice Vol 1–5 (Deluxe Edition) Nicolosi Productions

=== As sideman ===
With Stanley Turrentine

- Sugar (CTI, 1970)

With Stanley Turrentine and Milt Jackson

- Cherry (CTI, 1972)

With Mose Allison

- Western Man (Atlantic, 1971)
- Lessons in Living (1982)

With Gene Ammons

- Got My Own (Prestige, 1972)
- Big Bad Jug (Prestige, 1973)

With Ray Barretto

- The Other Road (1973)

With Roberto Tola

- Kon Tiki (EBM, 2021)

With George Benson

- Giblet Gravy (1968)
- White Rabbit (CTI, 1972)

With Bobby and the Midnites

- Bobby and the Midnites (1981)
- Where the Beat Meets the Street (1984)

With The Brothers Johnson

- Look Out for #1 (1976)

With James Brown

- Make It Funky: The Big Payback 1971–1975 (1996)

With Kenny Burrell

- Night Song (Verve, 1969)
- God Bless the Child (CTI, 1971)

With Cargo

- Cargo (1982)

With Ron Carter

- Uptown Conversation (Embryo, 1970)
- Blues Farm (CTI, 1973)
- All Blues (CTI, 1973)
- Spanish Blue (CTI, 1974)
- Yellow & Green (CTI, 1976)
- New York Slick (Milestone, 1980)
- Empire Jazz (RSO, 1980)

With Stanley Clarke

- School Days (1976)
- Atlantis with George Duke (1973)
- Live at the Greek with Larry Carlton (1993)

With Larry Coryell

- Spaces (1970)
- The Essential Larry Coryell (1975)
- Spaces Revisited (1997)

With Miles Davis

- Live-Evil (1970)
- A Tribute to Jack Johnson (1970)
- Big Fun (1974)
- Get Up with It (1974)
- Circle in the Round (1979)
- Directions (recorded 11.3.1960–27.2.1970, released 1980)
- The Complete Bitches Brew Sessions (recorded 1969–1970, released 1998)

With Richard Davis

- Way Out West (recorded 1977, Muse, 1980)
- Fancy Free (Galaxy, 1977)

With Eumir Deodato

- Prelude (1972)
- Deodato 2 (1973)
- Whirlwinds (1974)

With Dreams

- Dreams (1970)
- Imagine My Surprise (1971)

With Charles Earland

- Intensity (Prestige, 1972)

With Gil Evans

- Live at the Public Theater (New York 1980) (Trio, 1981)

With Fania All Stars

- Our Latin Thing (1972)
- Yankee Stadium (1973)
- Latin-Soul-Rock (1974)

With Roberta Flack and Donny Hathaway

- Roberta Flack & Donny Hathaway (1972)

With Peter Gabriel

- Passion: Music for The Last Temptation of Christ (1989)

With Johnny Hammond

- Breakout (Kudu, 1971)
- Wild Horses Rock Steady (Kudu, 1971)
- The Prophet (Kudu, 1972)

With Billy Harper

- Capra Black (Strata-East, 1973)

With Donald Harrison

- Heroes (Nagel Heyer, 2004)
- New York Cool: Live at The Blue Note (Half Note, 2005)
- This Is Jazz: Live at The Blue Note (Half Note, 2011)

With Freddie Hubbard

- Sky Dive (CTI, 1973)

With Jackie and Roy

- Time & Love (CTI, 1972)

With Milt Jackson

- Sunflower (CTI, 1972)

With Jazz Is Dead

- Blue Light Rain (Zebra, 1998)

With Quincy Jones

- The Anderson Tapes (1971)
- I Heard That!! (1976)

With Robin Kenyatta

- Gypsy Man (Atlantic, 1973)

With Hubert Laws

- Morning Star (CTI, 1972)
- Carnegie Hall (CTI, 1973)

With Mahavishnu Orchestra

- Inner Mounting Flame (1971)
- Birds of Fire (1973)
- Between Nothingness and Eternity (1973)
- The Best of Mahavishnu Orchestra (recorded 1971–1973, released 1980)
- The Lost Trident Sessions (recorded 1973, released 1999)
- Unreleased Tracks from Between Nothingness & Eternity (recorded 1973, released 2011)
- Mahavishnu (1984)

With Junior Mance

- With a Lotta Help from My Friends (Atlantic, 1970)

With Arif Mardin

- Journey (Atlantic, 1974)

With Les McCann

- Comment (Atlantic, 1970)
- Invitation to Openness (Atlantic, 1971)

With John McLaughlin

- My Goal's Beyond (Columbia, 1971)
- Love Devotion Surrender with Carlos Santana (Columbia, 1973)
- Electric Guitarist (Columbia, 1978)

With Mark-Almond Band

- Rising (1972)
- To the Heart (1976)

With Jimmy Owens

- Headin' Home (A&M/Horizon, 1978)

With Sonny Rollins

- The Way I Feel (Milestone, 1976)
- Don’t Stop the Carnival (Milestone, 1978)

With Michel Sardaby

- Michel Sardaby in New York (Sound Hills, 2002)

With Don Sebesky

- Giant Box (CTI, 1973)

With Horace Silver

- Serenade to a Soul Sister (1968)
- You Gotta Take a Little Love (1969)

With Carly Simon

- Hotcakes (1974)

With Lonnie Smith

- Mama Wailer (Kudu, 1971)

With Gábor Szabó

- Mizrab (CTI, 1972)

With Leon Thomas

- The Leon Thomas Album (Flying Dutchman, 1970)

With McCoy Tyner

- Fly with the Wind (Milestone, 1976)

With Miroslav Vitous

- Purple (1970)

With Grover Washington, Jr.

- All the King's Horses (Kudu, 1972)
- Soul Box (Kudu, 1973)

With Randy Weston

- Blue Moses (CTI, 1972)

With Jon Anderson

- 1000 Hands Chapter One (Solar, 2019)

With Robby Steinhardt

- Not in Kansas Anymore (Solar, 2021)

With Michael and Tim Franklin

- Anahata (Solar, 2023)
