= Michael Gurley =

American musician

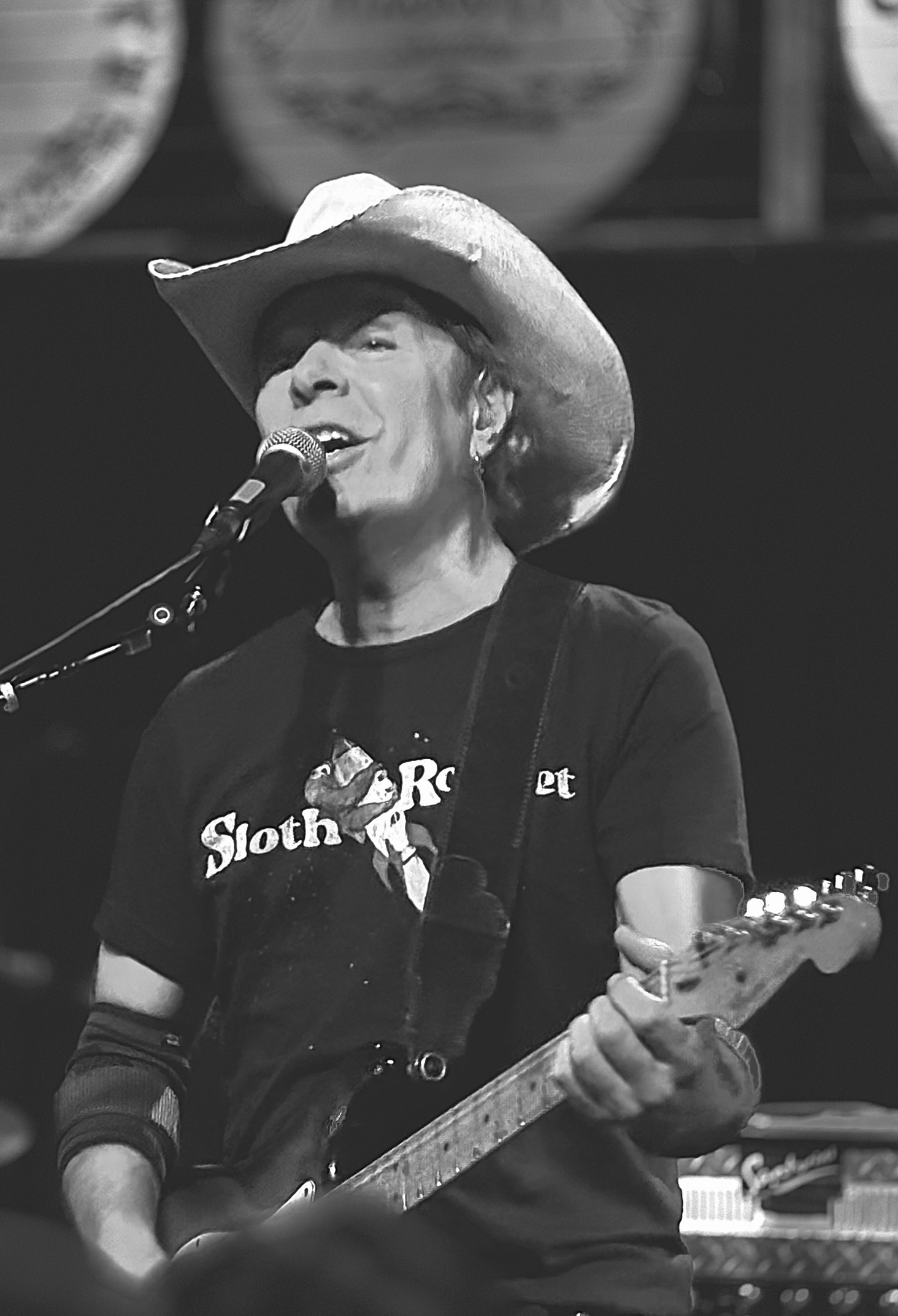
- Gurley onstage in 2024

Background information
- Genres: Rock, active rock, country, jazz standards, children's, folk
- Instrument: Guitar
- Years active: 1987–present

Michael Gurley is an American musician whose musical talents have been featured in many successful rock bands including dada and Butterfly Jones. He is best known as the guitarist and co-lead singer of dada.

== Musical career ==
Gurley's band dada gained popularity in 1992 with the release of their first single, "Dizz Knee Land", from their first album, Puzzle, which was produced by the legendary Ken Scott. "Dizz Knee Land" reached number 2 on the Billboard Heatseekers chart, number 5 on the Billboard Modern Rock chart, and number 27 on the Billboard Mainstream Rock Chart;. Puzzle sold more than half a million copies and received an RIAA gold record award. dada toured with Sting and bands such as Crowded House, and Izzy Stradlin and the Ju Ju Hounds. They opened shows for Stone Temple Pilots, Courtney Love, Sarah McLachlan, and a host of other bands and musicians.

Among others, Gurley has recorded and played with Ringo Starr of The Beatles, Stewart Copeland of The Police, and Mick Taylor of The Rolling Stones.

Gurley co-wrote and co-produced the album Drama Junkie Queen by the Los Angeles band Billy Boy On Poison. Billy Boy On Poison was signed to the record label Ironworks Music, owned by Jude Cole (producer for the band Lifehouse) and Kiefer Sutherland. Gurley previously wrote for and produced the band Wayland (based in Wayland, MI) along with Grammy-nominated producer, instrumentalist, and mixer Florian Ammon.

Gurley was a singer and the lead guitar player for Kiefer Sutherland in The Kiefer Sutherland Band for 6 years. He also performs in Mike Gurley and the Nightcaps, a jazz standards band. His early career included a stint in the power pop band Louis and Clark, which featured Louis Gutierrez of Mary's Danish and Joie Calio, bass player and vocalist for dada.

In his more than 30-year career, Gurley has published over 300 songs and has sold over 1,000,000 records.

== Television music ==
Gurley has written theme songs for three Disney Channel television series, with the best known being "American Dragon", the theme song for Disney’s animated series American Dragon: Jake Long, which was sung by The Jonas Brothers. His song "Stick Hippo" was used for the Disney Channel movie Prom. He has also written music for the Nickelodeon channel show SpongeBob SquarePants, and his music has been used in a variety of television shows and movies. Gurley, along with Joie Calio of dada, wrote the song "I'm Feeling Nothing," which is the opening song for The Brady Bunch Movie. He wrote and produced the song "On My Way", performed by Billy Boy On Poison. "On My Way" has been featured in commercials for DayQuil, Harley Davidson, Chrysler, and Nickelodeon as well as professional sports commercials. Gurley is also the singing voice in the commercial for the successful Xbox video game Titanfall.

== Discography ==
=== Louis and Clark ===
- Hollywood Capacity: Maximum (1987)

=== dada ===
- Puzzle (1992)
- American Highway Flower (1994)
- El Subliminoso (1996)
- dada (1998)
- Live: Official Bootleg (Volume 1) (2003)
- How to Be Found (2004)
- A Friend Of Pat Robertson (2006)

=== Butterfly Jones ===
- Napalm Springs (2001)

=== Mike Gurley and the Nightcaps ===
- Champagne Champagne (1996)
- Euphoria (1999)
- I Ain't Gonna Sit On Santa's Lap (2004)

=== Solo ===
- Ultrasound (2020)
- Campfire Singin’ Cowboy (2023)
- Right Now, Yesterday, and Tomorrow (2025)

=== Billy Boy On Poison ===
- Sweet Mess EP (writer/producer, 2008, Ironworks)
- Drama Junkie Queen (writer/producer, 2009, Ironworks)

==== Billy Boy On Poison singles ====
- "On My Way" (writer/producer, 2009)
- "Angry Young Man" (writer/producer, 2009)
- "4 Leaf Clover" (writer/producer, 2010)
