= Wall Street (disambiguation) =

Wall Street is a street which runs through the Financial District of New York City, which due to many financial centers being located on the street is further a metonym for the financial services industry of the United States.

Wall Street may also refer to:

== Places in New York ==
- Financial District, Manhattan, area of New York City containing Wall Street, and is sometimes known as "Wall Street"

=== Subway stations ===
- Wall Street station (IRT Broadway–Seventh Avenue Line), at William Street, serving the 2 and 3 trains
- Wall Street station (IRT Lexington Avenue Line), at Broadway, serving the 4 and 5 trains

== Arts and entertainment ==
- Wall Street (photograph), by Paul Strand
- Wall Street (1929 film), directed by Roy William Neill
- Wall Street (1987 film), directed by Oliver Stone
  - Wall Street, a novelization of the 1987 film by Kenneth Lipper
  - Wall Street (soundtrack), a soundtrack album from the 1987 film
  - Wall Street: Money Never Sleeps, a 2010 film directed by Oliver Stone, sequel to the 1987 film
- "Wall Street", a 1988 episode of Good Morning, Miss Bliss
- "Wall Street", a 1999 episode of Spin City
- Wall Street: Men and Money, a 1955 book by Martin Mayer
- Wall Street, a 1997 book by Doug Henwood
- Wall Street (Wig Wam album) or the title song, 2012

== Other uses ==
- Wallstreet, the world's first-ever 8c (5.14b) graded rock climb by Wolfgang Gullich.
- Wall Street (Asheville, North Carolina), a woonerf (or living street)
- Wall Street, a former train of the Reading Railroad

== See also ==
- Wall Street Historic District (Manhattan)
- Wall Street Historic District (Norwalk, Connecticut)
- The Wall Street Journal, a daily newspaper
- Occupy Wall Street, 2011 protests in Wall Street, part of the worldwide Occupy movement against socioeconomic inequality
- r/wallstreetbets, a subreddit (forum on the social media website Reddit) dedicated to the stock market
- The Black Wall Street (disambiguation)
- Wolf of Wall Street (disambiguation)
- Bay Street (disambiguation), a financial street in Toronto, Canada, also used metonymically to refer to the Canadian financial market
