= Shabazz (album) =

Live album by Billy Cobham
- Released: 1975
- Recorded: July 4 and 13, 1974
- Venue: Montreux Jazz Festival (Montreux); Rainbow Theatre (London)
- Genre: Jazz fusion
- Length: 39:57
- Label: Atlantic Records; SD 18139
- Producer: Ken Scott and Billy Cobham

Billy Cobham chronology
Total Eclipse (1974)	Shabazz (1975)	A Funky Thide of Sings (1975)

Shabazz is a live album by drummer Billy Cobham. It was recorded in Switzerland and England during July 1974, and was released on LP in 1975 by Atlantic Records. On the album, Cobham is joined by saxophonist Michael Brecker, trumpeter Randy Brecker, trombonist Glenn Ferris, guitarist John Abercrombie, keyboardist Milcho Leviev, and bassist Alex Blake.

All of the musicians had participated in the recording of Cobham's 1974 studio album Total Eclipse, and Abercrombie and the Brecker brothers had previously appeared on Crosswinds (1974) as well. "Taurian Matador" and "Red Baron" were originally recorded on Spectrum (1973).

== Reception ==
Professional ratings
Review scores
Source	Rating
AllMusic	4/5 stars
The Penguin Guide to Jazz	3/4 stars

In a review for AllMusic, Robert Taylor wrote: "All of the songs are blowing sessions allowing each musician ample time to develop their ideas... This is a good, old-fashioned blowing session that captures one of Cobham's best bands at their peak."

The authors of The Penguin Guide to Jazz Recordings stated: "Shabazz turned up the dials to 11... The recording is classic '70s 'in concert' fare, cavernous and booming, with the drums mixed well up, but still perfectly listenable."

Exposé Online's Jon Davis commented: "This band is in absolute top form... Shabazz is a great sounding recording for both performance and audio quality, and deserves a place as one of the best live fusion albums of the 70s."

The writers at Billboard included the album in their "Recommended LPs," stating "Cobham swings throughout." However, they cautioned: "at times it can get to be a bit too much."

== Track listing ==
All compositions by Billy Cobham.

1. "Shabazz" – 13:48
2. "Taurian Matador (Revised)" – 5:28
3. "Red Baron (Revised)" – 6:37
4. "Tenth Pinn" – 14:00
- "Taurian Matador" was recorded at the Montreux Jazz Festival, Switzerland, on July 4, 1974. Remaining tracks were recorded at the Rainbow Theatre, London, England, on July 13, 1974.

== Personnel ==
- Billy Cobham – percussion
- Michael Brecker – saxophone
- Randy Brecker – trumpet
- Glenn Ferris – trombone
- John Abercrombie – guitar
- Milcho Leviev – keyboards
- Alex Blake – bass
