= Wall Street Historic District =

Wall Street Historic District may refer to:

- Wall Street Historic District (Norwalk, Connecticut), listed on the NRHP in Fairfield County, Connecticut
- Wall Street Historic District (Manhattan), listed on the NRHP in New York County, New York

== See also ==
- Wall Street (disambiguation)
