= Dizz Knee Land =

Single by dada

from the album Puzzle
- Released: 1992
- Recorded: 1992
- Genre: Alternative rock
- Length: 4:03
- Label: I.R.S. Records
- Songwriter: Joie Calio/Michael Gurley
- Producer: Ken Scott

Dada singles chronology
"Dizz Knee Land" (1992)	""Dog"" (1993)

Music video
- "Dizz Knee Land" on YouTube

"Dizz Knee Land" is the debut single by American alternative rock band dada, released in 1992. It was the lead single from their first album, Puzzle. The song became a major hit on Modern Rock radio, reaching number 5 on the Billboard Modern Rock Tracks chart and number 27 on the Album Rock Tracks chart. Its success introduced the band to a national audience and helped Puzzle sell over 500,000 copies. The song is known for its distinctive stop-motion music video and its cryptic lyrics satirising media saturation.

== Background and writing ==
Dada formed in Los Angeles in 1991 when bassist Joie Calio and guitarist Michael Gurley began writing songs together. They were later joined by drummer Phil Leavitt. The trio quickly developed a style that blended vocal harmonies, acoustic and electric guitars, and a rhythm section tight enough to allow playful dynamic shifts. The name "dada" was chosen both for its absurdist connotations and because it was a palindrome.

Calio came up with the core idea for "Dizz Knee Land" in a dream. In a 1992 interview with the Westwood One radio program On the Edge, he recalled:

I got the idea for the song in a dream where I saw this word 'Disneyland' on a bus. I heard the melody and then I woke up, wrote it all down and called Mike up to finish it up.

The dream logic carried over into the song's meaning. Though the title is a deliberate misspelling of "Disneyland", Calio insisted the track was not actually about the theme park. Instead, it addresses the sensory overload of modern life, the way television channels flip between violence, sentimentality, and advertising, creating a surreal, disconnected experience. As he told On the Edge:

It's not about Disneyland at all... It has more to do with the craziness of the juxtaposition of the state of your every day. Just looking around you. You could see a guy's head being chopped off and, you know, a leg flying away and someone embracing someone in a lovely kiss and then flip the channel and then a chainsaw goes buzzing through, you know, some butter and it accidentally cuts your mom's head off and then you flip again and they're making love and then you flip again and it's Montana going 'I'm going to Disneyland'. You know, it's just that whole thing, how insane it is, but you know, it's just the natural state.

In a later interview with the Chicago Sun-Times, Calio elaborated: "It's our best-known song, but it's not our best song." He noted that the song's popularity was partly due to its catchy, upbeat sound, which belied its dark, fragmented lyrics.

== Recording and production ==
"Dizz Knee Land" was recorded in 1992 for dada's debut album Puzzle. The album was produced by Ken Scott, a legendary engineer and producer known for his work with The Beatles and David Bowie. Scott brought a clean, spacious production style that highlighted the band's three-part harmonies and the interplay between Gurley's acoustic and electric guitar parts. The track was recorded at various Los Angeles studios, with the basic tracks laid down live to capture the band's energy.

The song is built around a driving acoustic guitar riff that opens the track, soon joined by a tight rhythm section and a distorted electric guitar that punctuates the verses. Calio's lead vocal is double-tracked on the chorus, giving the line "I'm goin' to Dizz Knee Land" a mocking, sing-along quality. The bridge features a key change and a guitar solo that resolves back into the main riff.

== Music and lyrics ==
Musically, "Dizz Knee Land" fuses elements of alternative rock, pop rock, and funk. The song is in the key of E major and moves at a brisk tempo of around 122 beats per minute. The verses are delivered in a rapid-fire, almost spoken style, while the chorus opens up into a wide, melodic hook.

Lyrically, the song strings together a series of absurd, disconnected images: "Sittin' in a room with a big blue bunny," "A chainsaw buzzin' through some butter," "My mom's head came off," and the recurring refrain "I'm goin' to Dizz Knee Land." These vignettes mirror the experience of channel-surfing, where news, violence, and entertainment blend into a meaningless collage. The band intended the song to be a reflection on the numbing effect of mass media, but many listeners initially took the title literally and assumed it was a sarcastic ode to Disneyland.

== Release and chart performance ==
"Dizz Knee Land" was released as a single in 1992 by I.R.S. Records, shortly before the album Puzzle hit stores. It quickly gained traction on college radio and then on the newly influential Modern Rock format. The song debuted on the Billboard Modern Rock Tracks chart in August 1992 and steadily climbed, peaking at number 5 on November 7, 1992. It spent a total of 20 weeks on the chart. On the Album Rock Tracks chart, it reached number 27.

The song's success was buoyed by its frequent airplay on MTV and by the band's relentless touring schedule. They opened for acts such as The Black Crowes and Spin Doctors, exposing "Dizz Knee Land" to a wider audience. The single's performance helped Puzzle achieve gold certification in the United States.

== Music video ==
The music video for "Dizz Knee Land" was directed by a team known for using experimental animation techniques. It shows the band performing on a sparsely lit stage, interspersed with stop-motion sequences of everyday objects moving on their own: leaves skittering, hard candy rolling, nuts and bolts wriggling like insects, rusty tools, and a flatiron dragging itself across the floor. The animation style was directly inspired by the video for Peter Gabriel's "Sledgehammer", which had pioneered the use of stop-motion with real objects.

The video received heavy rotation on MTV's 120 Minutes and was featured on the channel's Alternative Nation. Its quirky, low-budget aesthetic fit the early 1990s alternative zeitgeist and helped cement the song's identity.

== Critical reception ==
"Dizz Knee Land" received generally positive reviews from music critics. In a retrospective review, Stephen Thomas Erlewine of AllMusic called the song a highlight of the early-90s alternative era, noting its "insanely catchy chorus and offbeat humor". The song has been included on various decade-spanning compilations, such as the box set Whatever: The '90s Pop and Culture Box.

Some critics, however, dismissed the track as a novelty hit that overshadowed the band's deeper album cuts. Calio himself acknowledged this sentiment, telling the Sun-Times: "It's our best-known song, but it's not our best song."

== Track listing ==
All songs written by Joie Calio and Michael Gurley.

- Cassette single / CD single (IRS 67007)
1. "Dizz Knee Land" – 4:03
2. "Moon" – 4:26
- 12-inch vinyl single / Maxi-CD
1. "Dizz Knee Land" (Album Version) – 4:03
2. "Dizz Knee Land" (Acoustic Version) – 3:58
3. "Moon" – 4:26

== Personnel ==
dada

- Joie Calio – lead vocals, bass guitar
- Michael Gurley – guitar, backing vocals
- Phil Leavitt – drums, percussion

Production

- Ken Scott – producer, engineer
- Mike Shipley – mixing

== Charts ==
Chart performance for "Dizz Knee Land"
Chart (1992)	Peak position
US Modern Rock Tracks (Billboard)	5
US Album Rock Tracks (Billboard)	27

== Legacy ==
"Dizz Knee Land" remains dada's most recognisable song and a staple of their live performances. The band has continued to tour and record for over three decades, and the song invariably appears near the end of their setlists. In interviews, the members have expressed mixed feelings about the song's dominance; while grateful for its role in launching their career, they have often noted that their catalogue contains many tracks they consider artistically superior.

The song has been featured in several 1990s-themed playlists and has appeared in documentaries and television shows about the alternative rock era. Its title, a deliberate misspelling of "Disneyland", has become a minor emblem of the wordplay that characterised much of the decade's alternative culture.
