= Kit Watkins =

American musician (born 1953)

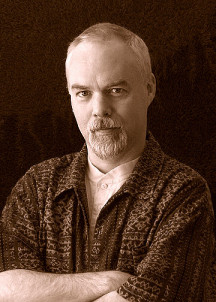
- Kit Watkins in 2001

Background information
- Born: November 20, 1953 (age 72); Virginia, U.S.
- Genres: Progressive Rock, Jazz, ambient
- Occupations: Recording artist, musician
- Instrument: Keyboards

Kit Watkins (born November 20, 1953) is an American progressive-ambient-jazz recording artist based in Brattleboro, Vermont. He was previously a member of the band Happy the Man.

== Beginnings ==
Born in Virginia to classical piano teachers, Watkins took piano lessons from the age of 5 to 13. As a teenager he began to play keyboards in various amateur bands, first playing Top 40 material, then moving to progressive rock covers by bands such as Yes and Emerson, Lake & Palmer. While a student at James Madison University, he met guitarist Stanley Whitaker, who introduced him to Gentle Giant, Genesis and Van der Graaf Generator. He joined Whitaker's fledgling band Happy the Man in 1973.

== Happy the Man (1973–1979) ==
The band moved to the Washington, DC, area in the summer of 1975 and developed a devoted following as a result of airplay on WGTB-FM (the Georgetown University radio station, which no longer broadcasts) as well as live performances sponsored by the station, headlining the Pandemedia event of that year. The band was a regular act at The Cellar Door in Georgetown, DC, and signed with the venue's management office. In 1976, the band signed with Clive Davis's Arista Records, which released two albums, Happy the Man (1977) and Crafty Hands (1978). Both albums were produced by Ken Scott, the engineer from The Beatles' White Album sessions, who also engineered and produced albums by David Bowie, Supertramp, Mahavishnu Orchestra, and the Dixie Dregs. Watkins worked closely with Scott as the band's representative in recording and mixing both Happy the Man albums. But before Crafty Hands was finished being recorded, Davis had a change of heart and dropped the band from his label.

In 1979, Happy the Man performed locally to an ever-growing audience but struggled to find another label to sign with. In the spring of 1979, Happy the Man disbanded only months after having recorded a demo tape of its 3rd album.

In 1983, Kit released the band's demo and called it 3rd, Better late... on his Azimuth record label.

== Performances ==
Kit and Brad Allen performed only one show in support of Frames of Mind album at a club called DC Space, on Jan 21 1982. During which concert, Brad broke a guitar string and took time out to repair it. During this break, someone called out a request, "Play Untitled!" Untitled, was an outtake from the Labyrinth album and was often performed live at Kit and Coco shows. Kit honored the request. Untitled was later released on Kit's Holographic Tapestries CD.

== Camel and early solo years ==
In June 1979, Watkins traveled to England to join Camel, and the band recorded a new album, I Can See Your House from Here for Decca Records, with Rupert Hine as producer.

During 1980, Watkins launched a solo career and recorded his first solo album, Labyrinth, (with Coco Roussel on drums) on Kit's own indie Label Azimuth. In a review of the album, critic George Varga described Watkins as "a composer and synthesizer wizard of almost unequaled talents." The LP was largely in the same vein as Happy the Man, including a couple of compositions written for Happy the Man's third album. "Kit & Coco" played duo concerts sparsely in the fall and winter of 1980 and 1981 - in between Kit's tours with Camel. The duo performed with backing tape accompaniment, often ending their set with an unaccompanied improvisation. A historic video tape of Kit & Coco's December 1, 1981 performance at DC's 9:30 Club was made but has never been released.

Watkins' next effort, Frames of Mind, with Brad Allen on guitars and vocals, appeared in 1982. The album was a fun and quirky mix of new wave pop and hybrid world music, recorded at Watkins' home studio in Arlington, Virginia and released on his label, Azimuth Records.

In 1983, Kit released Happy the Man's 3rd LP, Better late.. on his Azimuth Record Label.

== Later solo years ==
In 1987, Watkins relocated to Linden, Virginia in the rural Blue Ridge Mountains where he recorded and released several albums over the next 10 years, including Azure (1988), SunStruck (1990), and wet, dark, and low (1992) for the Minneapolis-based East Side Digital (ESD) label, and Thought Tones (1990), A Different View (1991), Kinetic Vapors (1993), Holographic Tapestries (1995), and Beauty Drifting (1996) for his Linden Music label. Linden also released a number of albums by other notable electronic/ambient artists, including David Borden, Robert Rich, and Jeff Greinke.

Linden Music closed its doors in 1997 due to distribution problems, but Watkins has continued releasing his work on CD, first via MP3.com and currently via Cafepress. In 2000, he signed a contract with One Way Records for the release of four of his albums (Labyrinth, SunStruck, wet, dark, and low, and Holographic Tapestries) which continue to be distributed nationally.

Recent albums include The Unseen (2000), Rolling Curve (2000), The Gathering (2001 - a live recording of a rare live performance given in Philadelphia that year), music for the end (2001), This Time and Space (2003), unraveled (2003), Flying Petals (2004), and World Fiction (2005). Critic Ernie Rideout, in reviewing Flying Petals, wrote that it "is as intriguing for the depth of compositional talent as it is for beautiful sound design and monster grooves."

Watkins has released two DVDs: a hypnotic visual work based on his album This Time and Space (2004); and The Gathering (2005), a live performance, videotaped by his longtime friend and Azimuth Records partner Sally Heldrich.

In 2008, Watkins began an association with the Earth Mantra ambient netlabel which has released many of his albums for free under a Creative Commons license.

== Discography ==
=== Solo ===
- Labyrinth (1980)
- Frames of Mind (1983)
- In Time (1985, with Coco Roussel)
- Azure (1989)
- SunStruck (1990)
- Thought Tones Volume 1 (1990)
- A Different View (1991)
- wet, dark, and low (1992)
- Thought Tones Volume 2 (1992)
- Kinetic Vapors (1993)
- Circle (1993)
- Holographic Tapestries (1995)
- Beauty Drifting (1996)
- Rolling Curve (2000)
- The Unseen (2000)
- The Gathering (2001)
- music for the end (2001)
- This Time and Space (2003)
- unraveled (2003)
- Flying Petals (2004)
- World Fiction (2005)
- SkyZone (2006)
- The Works (2007) (27 albums plus 12 bonus tracks : all in MP3 format on one DVD-DATA disc)
- Mockingbird Mantras (2015)
- Land (2015)
- Field of View (2019)

=== Happy the Man ===
- Happy the Man (1977)
- Crafty Hands (1978)
- Live (1978)
- 3rd, Better Late... (1983)

=== Camel ===
- I Can See Your House from Here (1979)
