= The Wolf of Wall Street (soundtrack) =

The Wolf of Wall Street: Music from the Motion Picture

Soundtrack album by Various artists
- Released: December 17, 2013
- Genres: Blues; jazz; classical rock
- Length: 56:30
- Label: Virgin
- Producers: Randall Poster; Robbie Robertson

The Wolf of Wall Street: Music from the Motion Picture is the soundtrack to the Martin Scorsese-directed 2013 epic biographical black comedy crime film of the same name released on December 17, 2013, for digital download and through physical CDs and vinyl editions on January 7, 2014, distributed by Virgin Records. The album features a roster of mid-century blues tracks from popular artists during the 1950s and 1960s. The music received critical acclaim and received a nomination for Grammy Award for Best Compilation Soundtrack for Visual Media, though lost to the soundtrack of Frozen (2013).

== Development ==
The film featured 60 tracks handpicked by Scorsese's regular collaborator and music supervisor Randall Poster; however, only 16 of them made it onto the official soundtrack release. The film does not feature an original music score, but is underscored by Canadian musician and fellow regular Scorsese collaborator Robbie Robertson, who also helped Poster on selecting the songs as well as serving as executive music producer.

The 2013 single "Black Skinhead" performed by Kanye West was used in the film's trailer for promotions, but was not included anywhere in the film as Poster went for a more "blues, early rock-and-roll motif" for the film. He said that "I think that the people that made the trailer, they were making it before we had a [completed] movie [...] You try to find something that is impactful for the trailer, and I think [Kanye] felt very 'now.' I think that in spite of the movie's period setting, some of the substance of it is contemporary."

Robertson sent Scorsese a few recordings of mid-century blues singles, that included Elmore James' cover of Robert Johnson's "Dust My Broom" (1951) and Howlin' Wolf's "Smokestack Lightning" (1956), as "nobody but Marty and me would have chosen Smokestack Lightning for a movie that takes place in the '80s and '90s because it's got nothing to do with anything except raw amazement [...] This is music that gets under your skin immediately," which attributes that blues-powered numbers attribute to the character development in tune to the epic debauchery that progresses in the film, despite time correctness. Scorsese supervised the film's editing with editor Thelma Schoonmaker, another one of his usual collaborators, for a year, cutting the image and music seamlessly, Robertson said that "For Marty, the music and the picture–it's the same thing [...] It's about cinematic power and finding something that goes beautifully counter point, and avoiding the obvious so the music works against the idea."

The independent band 7horse's original song "Meth Lab Zoso Sticker" from their 2011 album Let The 7Horse Run, was used by Scorsese in the film. The bandleader Phil Leavitt said that he received an email from the music clearance for the film, in last July, and added "It came out of the blue, and I still to this day don't know how Martin Scorsese or his people heard it, or who found it. I dug into it a bit and found out that Scorsese finds a lot of his own music for his movies. Randall Poster and [The Band's] Robbie Robertson also worked on the music. Maybe they heard it on satellite radio." Sharon Jones & the Dap-Kings performed the cover version of the 1964 Shirley Bassey single "Goldfinger" that was used in the film's soundtrack.

== Track listing ==
No.	Title	Artist(s)	Length
1.	"Mercy, Mercy, Mercy"	Cannonball Adderley	5:11
2.	"Dust My Broom"	Elmore James	2:53
3.	"Bang! Bang!"	Joe Cuba	4:06
4.	"Movin' Out (Anthony's Song)"	Billy Joel	3:29
5.	"C'est si bon"	Eartha Kitt	2:58
6.	"Goldfinger"	Sharon Jones & The Dap-Kings	2:30
7.	"Pretty Thing"	Bo Diddley	2:49
8.	"Moonlight in Vermont" (Live at the Pershing Lounge)	Ahmad Jamal	3:10
9.	"Smokestack Lightning"	Howlin' Wolf	3:07
10.	"Hey Leroy, Your Mama's Callin' You"	The Jimmy Castor Bunch	2:26
11.	"Double Dutch"	Malcolm McLaren	3:56
12.	"Never Say Never"	Romeo Void	5:54
13.	"Meth Lab Zoso Sticker"	7horse	3:42
14.	"Road Runner"	Bo Diddley	2:46
15.	"Mrs. Robinson"	The Lemonheads	3:44
16.	"Cast Your Fate to the Wind"	Allen Toussaint	3:19
Total length:			56:30

== Reception ==
=== Critical response ===
Gregory Heaney of AllMusic mentioned that the soundtrack "evokes the off-the-rails feeling of the film with its eclectic mish-mash of genres" and called it as "solid disc that offers many of the film's thrills without all fraud and greed." Paul Taylor of Lemonwire wrote "Martin Scorsese delivers a film with a soundtrack that hits all the right notes without the use of a traditional score. It's a tall order, but one Scorsese has proven time and time again that he is quite capable of dishing out. It is interesting that, unlike his other period films, in The Wolf of Wall Street, Scorsese draws on more songs that predate the historical setting of the film. It's a stylistic choice that the film benefits from, as it derives from the need to strike the right tone, rather than the historical accuracy of radio hits."

=== Analysis ===
Analysing the film's music, Ryan Leas of Consequence wrote "most of these songs are old and were already old in the era The Wolf of Wall Street depicts. That is not an uncommon quality to the music here. In fact, perhaps the defining characteristic of The Wolf of Wall Street‘s soundtrack is its focus on blues music. There are three Bo Diddley songs and two Howlin' Wolf songs, with John Lee Hooker and Elmore James rounding it out, and that aforementioned 7Horse song basically being used as if it's one of them, too. There are some classics used here, no doubt, but they make little sense in the world of The Wolf of Wall Street." However, he praised the brilliant use of "Smokestack Lightning" in the film which he said, that "The whole effect is ghostly, haunting, and gets at what I would imagine was the primary reason for using blues music so prominently in the movie. Both thematically and formally, blues music is foundational [...] much of blues music does have the sort of libidinous, desire-driven madness shared by Belfort. There's a way to parse Scorsese's use of blues music here as being in touch with something elemental, pulling up specters of Americana to further examine how the corruption of Belfort could be something endemic to the American identity." He mentioned the soundtrack to the film as "diverse as you might expect from Scorsese, but unfortunately, it feels more like a grab bag here than ingenuity" adding that "It's as sprawling and freewheeling as the movie, sure, but it's also mostly predictable."
