= The Wolf of Wall Street =

The Wolf of Wall Street may refer to:

- The Wolf of Wall Street (book), 2007 memoir by former stockbroker and trader Jordan Belfort
  - The Wolf of Wall Street (2013 film), based on Belfort's memoir, directed by Martin Scorsese
    - The Wolf of Wall Street (soundtrack), the soundtrack album accompanying the 2013 film
- The Wolf of Wall Street (1929 film), silent film directed by Rowland V. Lee and starring George Bancroft
- Wolves of Wall Street, 2002 American horror film directed by David DeCoteau
- Bernard Baruch (1870–1965), financier, stock investor, and statesman nicknamed the Lone Wolf of Wall Street
- David Lamar (1876–1934), con man known as the Wolf of Wall Street

== See also ==
- Wall Street (disambiguation)
