= Happy the Man (Happy the Man album) =

Studio album by Happy the Man
- Released: August 1977
- Recorded: November & December 1976
- Studios: A&M, Hollywood
- Genres: Progressive rock, jazz rock
- Length: 49:07
- Label: Arista Records
- Producer: Ken Scott

Happy the Man chronology
Happy the Man (1977)	Crafty Hands (1978)

Happy the Man is the debut album by the American progressive rock band Happy the Man, released in 1977. Rolling Stone ranked it 50th on their list of the 50 greatest prog-rock albums of all time.

== Reception ==
Professional ratings
Review scores
Source	Rating
AllMusic	3.5/5 stars

In a review for AllMusic, Donald A. Guarisco called the album "a solid prog outing that will find favor with those who enjoy art rock at its most complex and ambitious," and wrote: "Though it met with little commercial success, Happy the Man's 1977 debut quickly became a cult sensation with fans of prog rock. It's easy to see why: their sound combines a number of diverse influences in a distinctive manner, and their music is as complex and meticulously arranged as any prog album one cares to mention."

A writer for Rolling Stone stated that the album represents "the band at its most dynamic, highlighted by intricate instrumental interplay as far-out as the song titles."

Mike McLatchey of Exposé Online described the album as "one of the best debuts of all time and an essential item," noting that it is "some of the best, most elaborate and sophisticated symphonic rock ever produced, played by technical geniuses."

== Track listing ==
1. "Starborne" (Kit Watkins) – 4:22
2. "Stumpy Meets the Firecracker in Stencil Forest" (Stanley Whitaker) – 4:16
3. "Upon the Rainbow (Befrost)" (Watkins, Frank Wyatt) – 4:42
4. "Mr. Mirror's Reflections on Dreams" (Watkins) – 8:54
5. "Carousel" (Wyatt) – 4:06
6. "Knee Bitten Nymphs in Limbo" (Whitaker) – 5:22
7. "On Time as a Helix of Precious Laughs" (Wyatt) – 5:22
8. "Hidden Moods" (Watkins) – 3:41
9. "New York Dream's Suite" (Wyatt) – 8:32

== Personnel ==
- Stanley Whitaker – electric guitar, acoustic guitar (8), lead vocals (3,7)
- Frank Wyatt – keyboards, backing vocals, saxophone (2,3), flute (4,8), piano
- Kit Watkins – Minimoog, acoustic piano, Rhodes piano, ARP string ensemble, Hammond B3 organ, Hohner clavinet, flute (4,8), marimba (7)
- Rick Kennell – electric bass
- Mike Beck – drums, percussion

== Road Crew ==
- Eric Smith – Road Manager
- Steven Meeks – Stage Lighting
- Kenny Baily – Stage Manager
- Wayne Garber – Sound Engineer
- Live Sound Provided by Ace Pace
- Cover Art – Mary Walsh Photo/ Dennis Luzak Illustration Back cover *Photography – Mary Walsh Inner Sleeve Photo: Benno Friedman Design & *Art Direction – Bob Heimall

== Sources ==
- Happy the Man, Happy the Man. Arista Records AL4120, 1977 (liner notes)
