= Happy the Man =

American progressive rock band

- Origin: Harrisonburg, Virginia
- Genres: Progressive rock; jazz rock
- Years active: 1973–1979, 2000–present
- Labels: Arista Records, Azimuth Records, Cuneiform Records, InsideOut Music
- Members: Rick Kennell; Stanley Whitaker; Mike Beck; Ron Riddle
- Past members: Cliff Fortney; David Bach; Kit Watkins; Dan Owen; Coco Roussel; David Rosenthal; Joe Bergamini; Frank Wyatt

Happy the Man is an American progressive rock band formed in 1973 at James Madison University. The band was since based in Washington, D.C. The name Happy the Man is a reference to Goethe’s Faust and the Bible.

== History ==
=== Early days (1973–76) ===
The group formed in 1973 in Harrisonburg, Virginia. Guitarist Stanley Whitaker and bassist Rick Kennell first met in Germany in 1972. Whitaker, whose army officer father had left his native Missouri for Germany four years earlier, had formed Shady Grove, with fellow US expatriate, keyboardist David Bach, while Kennell had just been drafted and was stationed there, beginning a two-year stint in the army. The pair met when Kennell attended a Shady Grove gig in mid-1972, and discovering a shared love of British progressive rock, decided to form a band together. While the soon-to-be-graduate Whitaker was soon to return to the US, Kennell wasn't due back for a while, but he gave Whitaker the contacts of two former members of his teenage band Zelda, back in Fort Wayne, Indiana: drummer Mike Beck and singer/flautist Cliff Fortney, who both agreed to move to Virginia. The original lineup of the band was completed when Whitaker, now a student at James Madison University, met saxophonist/pianist Frank Wyatt. As Wyatt later recalled:

"Dr. George West was the instructor, and it was the first day of class. I remember there were, perhaps, 60 students in this very large room, and Dr. West was trying to feel out the class by playing two notes on the piano and seeing who could name the interval. At one point in the exercise, a voice shouted out "Dominant seventh… Hendrix!", and it was Stan. I made sure I met the skinny guy with long hair, and we became close friends right away."

This lineup did not last long however; as Kit Watkins, the son of a JMU piano teacher, replaced Bach early on. When in January 1974 Kennell at last returned from Germany (early shows had been performed without him), the band, named Happy the Man by Whitaker's brother Ken (who was strongly influenced by Christianity), was finally able to operate.

The band's early repertoire included a number of covers — notably Genesis’s "Watcher of the Skies", King Crimson’s "21st Century Schizoid Man" and Van der Graaf Generator’s "Man-Erg" — but they were soon outnumbered by original compositions, penned by Fortney, Watkins, Whitaker, and Wyatt, with the latter providing the lion's share of new material. In 1975 they moved closer to Washington, DC, where they got the attention of DJs at WGTB (Georgetown University radio), who helped break the band in DC. The station played their music, aired their interview, announced and sponsored their concerts and kept them in front of listeners.

In 1974, another lineup change occurred as Fortney (who wished to maintain his flute study) was replaced by Dan Owen, yet another old friend from Indiana. However, Owen's tenure in the band was brief, and after he left in early 1975, the band chose not to replace him; instead opting to make their material more instrumental. Hiring a vocalist was often discussed but never reinstated. There was resistance to giving the spotlight to a frontman; instead, Whitaker would handle all vocal duties over the course of the band's career.

Later that year they decided to move from Harrisonburg to Washington, DC, which they accomplished with the help of Dave Knapp. They soon signed a management deal with The Cellar Door — a venue where the band would perform many times. The Cellar Door became their management company and helped them get through to the labels, culminating in a showcase in New York City in front of iconic American record producer Clive Davis in the summer of 1976. After the presentation, Clive made the comment: "Wow. I don’t really understand this music. It’s way above my head, but my head of A&R, Rick Chertoff says you guys are incredible, and we should sign you, So welcome to Arista."

On June 28, 1976, former Genesis frontman Peter Gabriel, who wanted musicians for his solo band following his departure from Genesis, came down to the band’s house in Arlington for a try-out session, where he presented the band with some of his newly written material, including the song "Slowburn", which they rehearsed. Eventually Gabriel decided against hiring HTM, but this encounter proved instrumental in securing a five-year, multi-album deal with Arista Records.

=== The Arista years (1976–78) ===
Happy the Man's self-titled debut LP was recorded at A&M Studios towards the end of 1976, with Ken Scott (whose work with Mahavishnu Orchestra, Supertramp, and David Bowie had impressed them) handling production duties, and was released in 1977. The album included only two songs with vocals (both of which were compositions sung by Whitaker).

Much of 1977 was spent on the road. HTM’s management put them on tours supporting various artists, including Foreigner, Renaissance, Stomu Yamash’ta and the Jefferson Airplane offshoot Hot Tuna, with whom they performed to an audience of almost 10,000 at the Field House in Long Island.

In late 1977, Beck left the band, and was replaced by Ron Riddle. The band then recorded their second album, Crafty Hands. This time only one track, "Wind Up Doll Day Wind", featured any vocals, which again were performed by Whitaker. This album features Stanley playing guitars made by a little-known local guitar luthier at the time by the name of Paul Reed Smith. Stanley played a 6-string that now resembles a Santana I PRS, and 6/12-string doubleneck custom guitar. The 12-string guitar parts, as well as the guitar solo on "Ibby It Is" from Crafty Hands, is played on his PRS Doubleneck.

=== Dissolution (1978–79) ===
The contract with Arista Records was dissolved after Crafty Hands failed to make any significant commercial impact. Undeterred, the band soldiered on, enlisting French drummer Coco Roussel, formerly of Heldon and Clearlight, to replace Riddle, who had departed the band following the completion of the album. Towards the end of 1978 the band started adding new compositions to their live repertoire, and over the next few months enough material was assembled for the band's next release, which was given a working title of Labyrinth, and was demoed in February 1979 at the band house in Reston, Virginia. However, the band failed to secure a new contract, and on May 27, 1979 (a year to the day that Roussel had joined the band), Kit Watkins announced his departure to the British band Camel. The remaining members played one final show at the James Madison University before dissolving, with Whitaker and Kennell immediately forming a new band, Vision, with original HTM keyboardist David Bach. The bulk of the Labyrinth compositions would remain unreleased until 1983, when they surfaced under the title 3rd - Better Late... on Watkins’ own Azimuth label (the later CD reissue added two extra tracks from the same sessions, "Who's in Charge Here" and "Such a Warm Breeze").

=== Intervening Years (1979–2000) ===
While in the Camel camp, Watkins re-recorded the HTM track, "Eye of the Storm" onto Camel's 1979 Arista release I Can See Your House from Here, and two more Happy the Man tracks, "Labyrinth" and "While Crome Yellow Shine", on his 1980 solo album Labyrinth, recorded with the assistance of ex-HTM drummer Coco Roussel. Watkins and Roussel gigged as a duo with backing tapes in 1980–81 in and around the Baltimore – DC area, and would go on to collaborate on their 1984 duo album In Time and Roussel's 1992 solo CD Reaching Beyond.

The band's music has maintained an ongoing interest in progressive rock circles, supported by internet distribution, digital platforms, and archival CD reissues.

In 1990, a compilation of demos from 1974–75, Beginnings, was released by Kit on the Cuneiform Records Label as part of their Wayside Music Archive Series. It consisted of all previously unreleased compositions, some dating back to the original line-up with Cliff Fortney.

In 1999, Cuneiform put out a second archive CD, Death's Crown, consisting mostly as a suite under the title track, a 40-minute epic penned by Wyatt and recorded in the band's rehearsal room in 1974, when Dan Owen was in the band. The CD also includes an early version of a track first available on their debut Arista Records release, "New York Dream's Suite", also with Owen on vocals.

According to Frank Wyatt, this is how "Death's Crown (An Afterlife Fantasy) came about:

In 1974 Edward Kenestrick, a theatre professor at NYU, left New York to return to Harrisonburg, where he had taught prior at Madison college. There he met up with Happy the Man and spent the next three years working with them, providing lighting and multimedia design and touring direction. Members of the band had low incomes during this period, using food assistance and working part-time jobs. For a time the entire band lived together in a warehouse in Harrisonburg.

Kenestrick worked extensively at a dinner theatre outside Harrisonburg, The Blackfriar. Several band members were enlisted to play for productions there, including "The Fantasticks", directed by Kenestrick.

Kenestrick approached the band with an idea for a piece about one of his favorite figures, that of The Hanged Man in the Tarot. Wyatt ran with it, and the piece was developed to be a live performance with dance and multimedia. The piece was retitled as "Death's Crown" in conversations between Wyatt and Kenestrick, with the other band members concurring. There was only one performance, at the Blackfriar Theatre in late December, 1975.It was choreographed by Nancy Jo Morrisey, the house choreographer at the Blackfriar, but was not staged again as a multimedia production. The band continued to perform the music from the piece in several versions, "Open Book Without Words" devolving to "Open Book." Projections were continued as well, but there were no more live performers other than the musicians.

Later, in 1976, HTM was signed by Clive Davis at Arista records, and Bob Steinem, brother to Gloria, became the band's day-to-day manager. During that time the band lived at a house Steinem rented for them in Winchester, Virginia. Kenestrick traveled back and forth from New York City to Virginia with his friend Lloyd Halverson in Lloyd's Dodge pickup. Band members often visited NYC, particularly Frank Wyatt, and stayed at Kenestrick's loft on 26th Street in Manhattan. It was these visits that inspired Wyatt's composition, "New York Dreams Suite."

Other visual artists who worked with the band at that time were Steven Witt, Susie Rappold (Frank's then girl friend), Jeff Garringer, and John Hornberger, both also from Ft. Wayne. They provided light show effects, inspired by Kenestrick's work at the Fillmore East (his NYU office was on 2nd Avenue, where he could reach out the window and touch the FE banner), and slide shows, often using photos of art works. The visuals were keyed to the band's music; the content was often antiwar in nature. Their trips to New York included their signing with Arista, the audition for which was facilitated by Halverson's scheduling and transportation.

Also in 1999, the Arista albums were remastered by Kit Watkins and reissued by One Way Records in the USA and Musea in Europe. The European issues of the albums featured a biographical feature in the liner notes.

=== Reformation (2000–2005) ===
Following several aborted attempts over the previous decade, the group reformed for their first reunion performance on June 8, 2000, at The State Theatre in Falls Church, Virginia. This was followed shortly thereafter by an appearance at the NEARfest 2000 Festival. The lineup consisted of mainstays Kennell, Whitaker, and Wyatt, along with a returning Ron Riddle and new recruit David Rosenthal on keyboards. Riddle departed again in 2002 and was replaced by Joe Bergamini. The band released a new album in 2004 entitled "The Muse Awakens." Whitaker and Wyatt later released another album, "Pedal Giant Animals," and formed a new band, "Oblivion Sun," which left the status of HTM unclear.

Frank Wyatt died from cancer in January 2023.

== Personnel ==
=== Members ===
Current members

- Rick Kennell - bass guitar (1973–79, 2000–present)
- Stanley Whitaker - guitars, vocals (1973–79, 2000–present)
- Ron Riddle - drums, orchestration, keyboards (1977–78, 2000–02, 2024-present)
- Mike Beck - drums, percussion (1973-1977, 2024–present)

Former members

- Cliff Fortney - vocals, flute (1973–74)
- David Bach - keyboards (1973)
- Kit Watkins - keyboards, flute (1973–79)
- Dan Owen - vocals (1974–1975)
- Coco Roussel - drums (1978–79)
- David Rosenthal - keyboards (2000–2023)
- Joe Bergamini - drums (2002–2023)
- Frank Wyatt - keyboards, saxophones, flute (1973–79, 2000–2023, d. 2023)

=== Lineups ===
| 1973 | 1973–74 | 1974–75 | 1975–77 |
|---|---|---|---|
| Cliff Fortney - lead vocals, flute, keyboards; Stanley Whitaker - guitars, backing vocals; Frank Wyatt - keyboards, backing vocals, saxophones, flute; David Bach - keyboards; Rick Kennell - bass; Mike Beck - drums, percussion | Cliff Fortney - lead vocals, flute, keyboards; Stanley Whitaker - guitars, backing vocals; Frank Wyatt - keyboards, backing vocals, saxophones, flute; Kit Watkins - keyboards, backing vocals; Rick Kennell - bass; Mike Beck - drums, percussion | Dan Owen - lead vocals; Stanley Whitaker - guitars, backing vocals; Frank Wyatt - keyboards, backing vocals, saxophones, flute; Kit Watkins - keyboards, backing vocals; Rick Kennell - bass; Mike Beck - drums, percussion | Stanley Whitaker - guitars, lead vocals; Frank Wyatt - keyboards, backing vocals, saxophones, flute; Kit Watkins - keyboards, backing vocals; Rick Kennell - bass; Mike Beck - drums, percussion |
| 1977–78 | 1978–79 | 1979 | 1979–2000 |
| Stanley Whitaker - guitars, lead vocals; Frank Wyatt - keyboards, backing vocals, saxophones, flute; Kit Watkins - keyboards, backing vocals; Rick Kennell - bass; Ron Riddle - drums, percussion | Stanley Whitaker - guitars, lead vocals; Frank Wyatt - keyboards, backing vocals, saxophones, flute; Kit Watkins - keyboards, backing vocals; Rick Kennell - bass; Coco Roussel - drums | Stanley Whitaker - guitars, lead vocals; Frank Wyatt - keyboards, backing vocals, saxophones, flute; Rick Kennell - bass; Coco Roussel - drums | Disbanded |
| 2000–02 | 2002–2023 | 2024-current |
| Stanley Whitaker - guitars, lead vocals; Frank Wyatt - keyboards, backing vocals, saxophones, flute; David Rosenthal - keyboards; Rick Kennell - bass; Ron Riddle - drums, percussion | Stanley Whitaker - guitars, lead vocals; Frank Wyatt - keyboards, backing vocals, saxophones, flute; David Rosenthal - keyboards; Rick Kennell - bass; Joe Bergamini - drums, percussion | Stanley Whitaker - guitars, lead vocals; Rick Kennell - bass; Mike Beck - percussion; Ron Riddle - drums, keyboards, orchestration |

== Discography ==
Studio

- Happy the Man (Arista 1977 & 1988, One Way 1999)
- Crafty Hands (Arista 1978 & 1988, One Way 1999)
- 3rd - Better Late... (recorded 1979; released Wayside 1990)
- Beginnings (recorded 1974–5, released Wayside 1990)
- Death's Crown (unreleased 1974 & 1976 material, released Cuneiform 1999)
- The Muse Awakens (Inside Out Music 2004)

Live & Compilations

- Retrospective (East Side Digital 1989)
- Live (recorded in 1978; released Linden Music 1994)
