= Beginnings (Happy the Man album) =

Studio album by Happy the Man
- Released: 1990
- Recorded: 1974–1975
- Genre: Progressive rock
- Length: 61:26
- Label: Cuneiform Records
- Producer: Happy the Man

Happy the Man chronology
3rd - Better Late... (1983)	Beginnings (1990)	Death's Crown (1999)

Beginnings is an album by the progressive rock band Happy the Man, released in 1990 but composed of material written and recorded during Happy the Man's first two years, 1974 and 1975. Originally recorded on 2- and 4-track tape as demos, the material was compiled and transferred to DAT where additional mixing and processing was added by Kit Watkins.

== Track listing ==
1. "Leave That Kitten Alone, Armone" (Wyatt) – 9:16
2. "Passion's Passing" (Wyatt) – 8:40
3. "Don't Look to The Running Sun" (Cliff Fortney) – 9:52
4. "Gretchen's Garden" (Wyatt/Ken Whitaker) – 11:04
5. "Partly The State" (Kit Watkins) – 5:49
6. "Broken Waves" (Wyatt) – 4:53
7. "Portrait of a Waterfall" (Whitaker) – 6:45

== Personnel ==
- Cliff Fortney - lead vocals (2–5), flute (2–5), electric piano (2–5)
- Stanley Whitaker - six and twelve string guitars, backing and lead vocals
- Kit Watkins - keyboards, backing vocals
- Frank Wyatt - keyboards, backing vocals, alto saxophone, flute
- Rick Kennell - bass
- Mike Beck - drums, percussion
