= Joe Bergamini =

American drummer

Joe Bergamini is a drummer from New Jersey in the United States. He is the co-founder of the instrumental progressive rock band 4Front. 4Front's other founder, guitarist/songwriter Zak Rizvi, went on to become a member of the classic rock group Kansas in 2016. Since 2000 Bergamini has been a member of progressive rock band Happy the Man, and appears on their 2005 album The Muse Awakens. In 2003 Bergamini began working on Broadway, with his first show being the New York and national tour productions of the Billy Joel musical Movin' Out, and has also performed at the Broadway productions of Beautiful: The Carole King Musical, School of Rock: The Musical, Rock of Ages, In The Heights, The Lion King, Jersey Boys, Pippin (revival), Jesus Christ Superstar (revival), Spider-Man: Turn Off the Dark, and Million Dollar Quartet. In addition to performing with Billy Joel himself at Movin' Out, Bergamini has also performed with Bumblefoot, Dennis DeYoung and Deborah Gibson. He held the drum chair for the short-lived Broadway show Gettin' the Band Back Together in 2018. Bergamini was born in Belleville, New Jersey, and grew up in East Hanover. He attended the New Jersey Institute of Technology, receiving a bachelor's degree in architecture while studying drums with Dom Famularo on Long Island, as well as teachers Al Miller, John Riley, and Jim Chapin.

Bergamini is known for his work in the area of drum education. He has operated his own private teaching practice since 1990, and among his many successful students is jazz drummer Mark Guiliana. In addition to having given many drum clinics in schools and retail stores in the US, Bergamini has also appeared at large international drum events including the Percussive Arts Society International Convention (PASIC) (multiple appearances), the Ultimate Drummers Weekend (Melbourne, Australia) (2002 & 2007), The Cape Breton Drum Festival (Nova Scotia, Canada), and KOSA (Vermont, US).

After many years as a columnist and contributing writer for Modern Drummer magazine, he served a brief stint as the drum editor for Carl Fischer publications. In 2007 he became the Senior Drum Editor for Hudson Music, a position which he still holds (as of 2023). In this capacity he has worked with some of the world's most famous drummers, including Steve Smith, Keith Carlock, Stanton Moore, David Garibaldi, Gavin Harrison, Simon Phillips, and many others. Bergamini was the co-producer, co-writer and onscreen interviewer for Neil Peart's 2011 Hudson Music DVD Taking Center Stage and the author of the companion book of the same name. In 2021 Bergamini worked with Stewart Copeland, writing a book about Copeland's career entitled Stewart Copeland: Drumming in the Police and Beyond. He has collaborated on two projects with Steve Gadd; serving as editor of Gadd's first educational drum book, Gaddiments) and then writing Gadd's authorized musical biography, GADD: A Life in Time. In 2024, Bergamini collaborated with jazz legend Billy Cobham on COBHAM: The Music and Drumming of Billy Cobham.

As a music industry consultant, Bergamini has also worked with Tama Drums during the R&D for their Bubinga Omnitune drums, and appears on the Tama website in various educational videos. He is also a featured endorser of Sabian cymbals, Vic Firth sticks, Evans drumheads, and Latin Percussion. In 2015 Bergamini became Education Consultant to Sabian Ltd., in which capacity he designed and launched the Sabian Education Network, a club/network designed to help drum teachers in both educational and business skills.

In 2007 Bergamini and his former teacher Dom Famularo founded the company Wizdom Media LLC, an independent music publisher specializing in drum books. Bergamini continues to operate the company in partnership with Famularo's estate.

== Discography ==
- The Doo Wop Project - Echoes of the Street (2025)
- The Doo Wop Project - Old School New Generation (2022)
- The Doo Wop Project - A Live Concert Event (PBS Special, 2022)
- 4Front - Malice in Wonderland
- Flaud Logic - Flaud Logic
- Happy The Man - The Muse Awakens
- 4Front - Radio Waves Goodbye
- 4Front - Gravity
- Joe Bergamini - Arrival
- Gettin' the Band Back Together - Original Broadway Cast Recording
- Bumblefoot - Uncool
- Broadway's Greatest Gifts / Carols for a Cure Vol. 7 (1 track)
- Playground - What Was Is

=== BOOKS ===
- COBHAM: The Music and Drumming of Billy Cobham (Hudson Music)
- GADD: A Life in Time (Hudson Music)
- Neil Peart; Taking Center Stage : A Lifetime Of Live Performance (Hudson Music)
- Stewart Copeland: Drumming in the Police and Beyond (Hudson Music)
- The Working Drummer's Chart Book (Hudson Music)
- Arrival Drum Play-Along (Hudson Music)
- MD Classic Tracks (Modern Drummer Publications)
- Drum Techniques of Led Zeppelin (Alfred)
- Operation: Rockenfield - The Drumming of Queensryche (with Craig LeMay) (Carl Fischer)
- Drumming Out of the Shadows (with Jason Bittner) (Carl Fischer)
- Polyrhythmic Potential (with Chris Pennie) (Carl Fischer)
- Pedal Control (with Dom Famularo) (Alfred)
- It's Your Move (with Dom Famularo) (Alfred)
- Turn It Up, Lay It Down: The Book, Vol. 1 (Alfred)
