= Black Wall Street =

The Black Wall Street may refer to:

- Greenwood District, Tulsa, Oklahoma, a neighborhood containing many African-American businesses in the early 20th Century
  - Tulsa race massacre of 1921, in which a white mob destroyed much of Greenwood
- Jackson Ward, a thriving African-American business community in Richmond, Virginia
- Black Wall Street (Durham, North Carolina), Parrish Street, in Durham, North Carolina, an area of successful black-owned businesses
- The Black Wall Street Records, a record label

== See also ==
- Wall Street (disambiguation)
