= Bay Street (disambiguation) =

Bay Street is a street in Toronto, Ontario, Canada.

Bay Street may also refer to:

- Bay Street (entertainment complex), a shopping and entertainment centre in St. Julian's, Malta
- Bay Street (Hamilton, Ontario), the financial centre of Hamilton, Ontario, Canada
- Bay Street (Savannah, Georgia), a street in the United States
- Bay Street (Victoria, British Columbia), an arterial road in Victoria, British Columbia, Canada
- Bay Street (Nassau), the political, cultural, financial, and tourist center of Nassau, Bahamas
- Bay Street Boys, a nickname for the white, segregationist oligarchy of the United Bahamian Party in the 1950s and 1960s
- Bay Street Emeryville, a mall in Emeryville, San Francisco Bay Area, California, United States
- Bay Street Film Festival, an independent film festival in Thunder Bay, Ontario, Canada
- Bay Street station, a commuter rail station in Montclair, New Jersey, United States
- International Plaza and Bay Street, a shopping mall in Tampa, Florida, United States

== See also ==
- Wall Street (disambiguation), the US equivalent in New York City
