= Total Eclipse (Billy Cobham album) =

Studio album by Billy Cobham
- Released: 1974
- Studio: Atlantic and Electric Lady, New York City; re-mixed at Scorpio & Trident, London, England.
- Genre: Jazz fusion
- Length: 44:15
- Label: Atlantic
- Producer: William E. Cobham, Jr., Ken Scott

Billy Cobham chronology
Crosswinds (1974)	Total Eclipse (1974)	Shabazz (1975)

Total Eclipse is the third album of fusion drummer Billy Cobham. The album was released in 1974. It comprises eight songs, all written by Billy Cobham. The album peaked number 6 in the Billboard Jazz album chart, number 12 in the R&B album chart, and number 36 in the Billboard pop albums chart.

Professional ratings
Review scores
Source	Rating
Allmusic	3.5/5 stars
The Rolling Stone Jazz Record Guide	2/5 stars
The Penguin Guide to Jazz Recordings	3/4 stars
DownBeat	4/5 stars

== Track listing ==
All selections written by Billy Cobham.

=== Side one ===
1. "Solarization" – 11:09
  - a. "Solarization" – 3:00
  - b. "Second Phase" – 1:43
  - c. "Crescent Sun" – 2:40
  - d. "Voyage" – 2:56
  - e. "Solarization-Recapitulation" – 0:50
2. "Lunarputians – 2:32
3. "Total Eclipse" – 5:59
4. "Bandits" – 2:30

=== Side two ===
1. "Moon Germs" – 4:55
2. "The Moon Ain't Made of Green Cheese" – 0:56
3. "Sea of Tranquility" – 10:44
4. "Last Frontier" – 5:22

== Personnel ==
The personnel on all sections is:

- John Abercrombie – electric & ovation guitars
- Michael Brecker – flute, soprano & tenor saxes
- Randy Brecker – trumpet, flugelhorn
- Glenn Ferris – tenor & bass trombones
- Billy Cobham – traps, timpani, acoustic piano on "The Moon Ain't Made Of Green Cheese" & "Last Frontier"
- Milcho Leviev – keyboards
- Alex Blake – electric bass

Additional musicians

- David Earle Johnson – congas on "Solarization" & "Moon Germs"
- Sue Evans – marimba on "Solarization"
- Cornell Dupree – first guitar solo on "Moon Germs"

=== Credits ===
- Ken Scott – recording and re-mixing engineer
- Bob Warner – tape operator & assistant
- Gilbert Stone – cover illustration
- Bob Defrin – art direction

== Charts ==
Chart (1974)	Peak position
US Top LPs & Tape (Billboard)	36
US Soul LPs (Billboard)	12
US Jazz LPs (Billboard)	6
