= Crafty Hands =

Studio album by Happy the Man
- Released: 21 September 1978
- Recorded: December 1977 & January 1978
- Genre: Progressive rock
- Length: 41:36
- Label: Arista Records (reissues: One Way, Musea)
- Producer: Ken Scott

Happy the Man chronology
| Happy the Man (1977) | Crafty Hands (1978) | 3rd - Better Late... (1983) |

Crafty Hands is the second studio album by the progressive rock band Happy the Man, released in 1978. Only one track, "Wind Up Doll Day Wind," contains vocals.

== Reception ==
Professional ratings
Review scores
| Source | Rating |
|---|---|
| Allmusic | 4/5 stars |

Mike McLatchey of Exposé Online stated that the album displays "some of the best, most elaborate and sophisticated symphonic rock ever produced, played by technical geniuses," but noted that, in comparison with the group's debut album, "Crafty Hands seems more polished, yet overall slightly less impressive."

Pete Pardo, writing for Sea of Tranquility, commented: "As far as US prog goes, it doesn't get much better than this folks. Crafty Hands is classy stuff all the way."

== Track listing ==
1. "Service with a Smile" (Ron Riddle, Greg Hawkes) – 2:44
2. "Morning Sun" (Kit Watkins) – 4:05
3. "Ibby It Is" (Frank Wyatt) – 7:50
4. "Steaming Pipes" (Stanley Whitaker) – 5:30
5. "Wind Up Doll Day Wind" (Watkins, Whitaker, Wyatt) – 7:06
6. "Open Book" (Wyatt) – 4:53
7. "I Forgot to Push It" (Watkins) – 3:08
8. "The Moon, I Sing (Nossuri)" (Watkins) – 6:16

== Personnel ==
- Stanley Whitaker – six and twelve string guitars, vocals (5)
- Frank Wyatt – pianos, harpsichord, saxes, flute, words
- Kit Watkins – pianos, harpsichord, Moog synthesizer, fake strings, clavinet, 33, recorder
- Rick Kennell – bass
- Ron Riddle – drums, percussion
