= Crosswinds (Billy Cobham album) =

Studio album by Billy Cobham
- Released: 1974
- Studio: Electric Lady, New York City; re-mixed at Trident, London, England
- Genre: Jazz fusion
- Length: 35:20
- Label: Atlantic
- Producer: William E. Cobham, Jr., Ken Scott

Billy Cobham chronology
Spectrum (1973)	Crosswinds (1974)	Total Eclipse (1974)

Crosswinds is the second album of fusion drummer Billy Cobham. The album was released in 1974 and it contains four songs in total, all composed by Billy Cobham. It features songs that are more mid-tempo and slow-tempo as opposed to the earlier Spectrum album.

Professional ratings
Review scores
Source	Rating
Allmusic	3.5/5 stars
The Rolling Stone Jazz Record Guide	3/5 stars
The Penguin Guide to Jazz Recordings	3/4 stars

== Cover art ==
A photo taken by Billy Cobham himself is used for the cover art; it wraps around the spine to comprise both the front and back cover.

== Track listing ==
All selections written by Billy Cobham.

=== Side one ===
1. "Spanish Moss – 'A Sound Portrait'" – 17:08
  a. "Spanish Moss" – 4:08
  b. "Savannah The Serene" – 5:09
  Solos: Garnett Brown & George Duke
  c. "Storm" – 2:46
  Solo: Billy Cobham
  d. "Flash Flood" – 5:05
  Solos: Randy Brecker & John Abercrombie

=== Side two ===
1. "The Pleasant Pheasant" – 5:11
  Solos: Lee Pastora, Michael Brecker, George Duke & Billy Cobham
2. "Heather" – 8:25
  Solos: George Duke & Michael Brecker
3. "Crosswind" – 3:39
  Solo: John Abercrombie

== Personnel ==
- Billy Cobham – drums, percussion, production, orchestrations
- John Abercrombie – guitars
- George Duke – keyboards
- Michael Brecker – woodwinds
- Randy Brecker – trumpet
- Garnett Brown – trombone
- John Williams – acoustic & electric basses
- Lee Pastora – latin percussion
- Ken Scott – production, recording and re-mix engineering

== Chart performance ==
Year	Chart	Position
1974	Billboard 200	23
1974	Billboard R&B Albums	19
1974	Billboard Jazz Albums	2

== Trivia ==
The song "Heather" was used as the basis for the Souls of Mischief song "93 'til Infinity".
