= Spectrum (Billy Cobham album) =

Studio album by Billy Cobham
- Released: October 1, 1973
- Recorded: May 14–16, 1973
- Studios: Electric Lady, New York City; mixed at Trident, London
- Genre: Jazz fusion
- Length: 37:23
- Label: Atlantic
- Producer: Billy Cobham

Billy Cobham chronology
Spectrum (1973)	Crosswinds (1974)

Spectrum is the debut solo album by jazz fusion drummer Billy Cobham.

The song "Stratus" appears in the video game Grand Theft Auto IV on the radio station "Fusion FM", as well as being the main sample in the Massive Attack hit "Safe from Harm".

== Recording ==
The recording process took place at Electric Lady Studios. According to Leland Sklar it was done in just two or three days and almost every track that ended up on a record was "first or second take at the most".

Ken Scott, engineer of Spectrum, recounted: "Bill Cobham's drums were treated in exactly the same way as I recorded every other drummer. I just used more mics: Neumann U67s on toms, D20s or RE20s (at Electric Lady) on the bass drums, Neumann KM54 or 56 on snare, and either STC 4038s or Beyer M160 ribbon mics for the overheads. One other thing: in order to dampen the snare, Bill just laid his wallet on the top head."

Leland Sklar, bassist on four of the songs, remarked, "Spectrum is such a benchmark for so many people. There was a sort of fire in it. It was new ground and it wasn't very analytical. It was more flying by the seat of your pants. That's where great accidents happen, which seems impossible these days. We never did more than a couple of takes on any of it. It was more or less a two-day record. It went by so fast." Sklar as well as pianist Jan Hammer recall that the music was recorded live and was not edited or fixed in any way afterwards. This recording method captured Tommy Bolin breaking his high E string while soloing on "Taurian Matador" (approximately at 1:45 into the track) and continuing playing. Bolin used a Fender Stratocaster and a Maestro Echoplex delay unit, prominently heard on "Quadrant 4". Sklar attests that he played his 1962 Fender Jazz bass through a small Univox amp with a single 12″ speaker.

Not as well known at the time, Tommy Bolin plays lead guitar on four songs. Cobham had met Bolin years before, when he was a member of Zephyr. Bolin had recently joined rock band James Gang, and recorded his first album with that band just two months prior to the Spectrum sessions.

"To the Women in My Life" is unusual in that Cobham himself does not play on it, though he did produce the track. It is an unaccompanied piano piece performed by Hammer.

== Critical reception ==
Retrospective professional reviews
Review scores
Source	Rating
AllMusic	5/5 stars
Christgau's Record Guide	C+
The Rolling Stone Jazz Record Guide	4/5 stars
Sputnikmusic	4/5
The Penguin Guide to Jazz Recordings	3.5/4 stars

Spectrum received positive reviews from contemporary critics. However, Robert Christgau offered a dissenting review for Creem magazine, calling Cobham "Mahavishnu's muscle-headed muscle man" and saying, "Despite a few tough minutes this is basically slick, gimmicky, one-dimensional—in a word, undemanding. All of which may make him a star." Scott Yanow was more impressed by the record, writing years later in his review for AllMusic that Spectrum remains Cobham's best and an exceptional jazz fusion album with "rock-ish rhythms and jazz improvising".

== Track listing ==
All songs written and composed by Billy Cobham.

1. "Quadrant 4" – 4:20
2. "Searching for the Right Door" – 1:19 / "Spectrum" – 5:07
3. "Anxiety" – 1:41 / "Taurian Matador" – 3:03
4. "Stratus" – 9:48
5. "To the Women in My Life" – 0:51 / "Le Lis" – 3:20
6. "Snoopy's Search" – 1:02 / "Red Baron" – 6:37

Though tracks 2, 3, 5, and 6 are designated as medleys, all of the component songs have clean breaks between them. Most recent CD issues list 10 tracks.

== Personnel ==
- Billy Cobham – drums, percussion, production
- Jan Hammer – electric and acoustic pianos, Moog synthesizer
- Ken Scott – recording and re-mix engineering

Additional personnel on "Quadrant 4", "Taurian Matador", "Stratus", and "Red Baron"

- Tommy Bolin – guitar, Echoplex
- Lee Sklar – electric bass

Additional personnel on "Spectrum" and "Le Lis"

- Joe Farrell – soprano and alto saxes, flute
- Jimmy Owens – flugelhorn, trumpet
- John Tropea – guitar on "Le Lis"
- Ron Carter – acoustic bass
- Ray Barretto – congas

== Chart performance ==
Year	Chart	Position
1974	Billboard 200	26
1973	Billboard Jazz Albums	1
