= Wall Street (soundtrack) =

Wall Street (Original Motion Picture Soundtrack)

Soundtrack album by Stewart Copeland
- Released: 1988

The soundtrack for the 1987 Oliver Stone movie Wall Street was composed and arranged by Stewart Copeland. Released on LP record in 1988, a CD version was produced in 1993. Copeland is praised for a "relentless, pounding soundtrack, very much a product of its time". The music for the film also contains songs by Frank Sinatra ("Fly Me to the Moon"), by David Byrne and Brian Eno and Talking Heads (This Must Be the Place).

== Track listing ==
No.	Title	Length
1.	"Kent: Unpredictable (from Talk Radio)"	2:18
2.	"Dietz: Just Come Right in Here, Denise (from Talk Radio)"	3:07
3.	"TLKa: We Know Where You Live (from Talk Radio)"	3:52
4.	"Tick: We Feel Too Much (from Talk Radio)"	2:48
5.	"Trend: He Has Heart (from Talk Radio)"	3:12
6.	"Bud's Scam"	2:51
7.	"Are You with Me?"	1:15
8.	"Trading Begins"	2:25
9.	"The Tall Weeds"	3:04
10.	"Break-Up (Darian)"	2:03
11.	"Anacott Steal"	2:54
12.	"End Title Theme"	1:09
