= Wall Street (Asheville, North Carolina) =

Street in Asheville, North Carolina

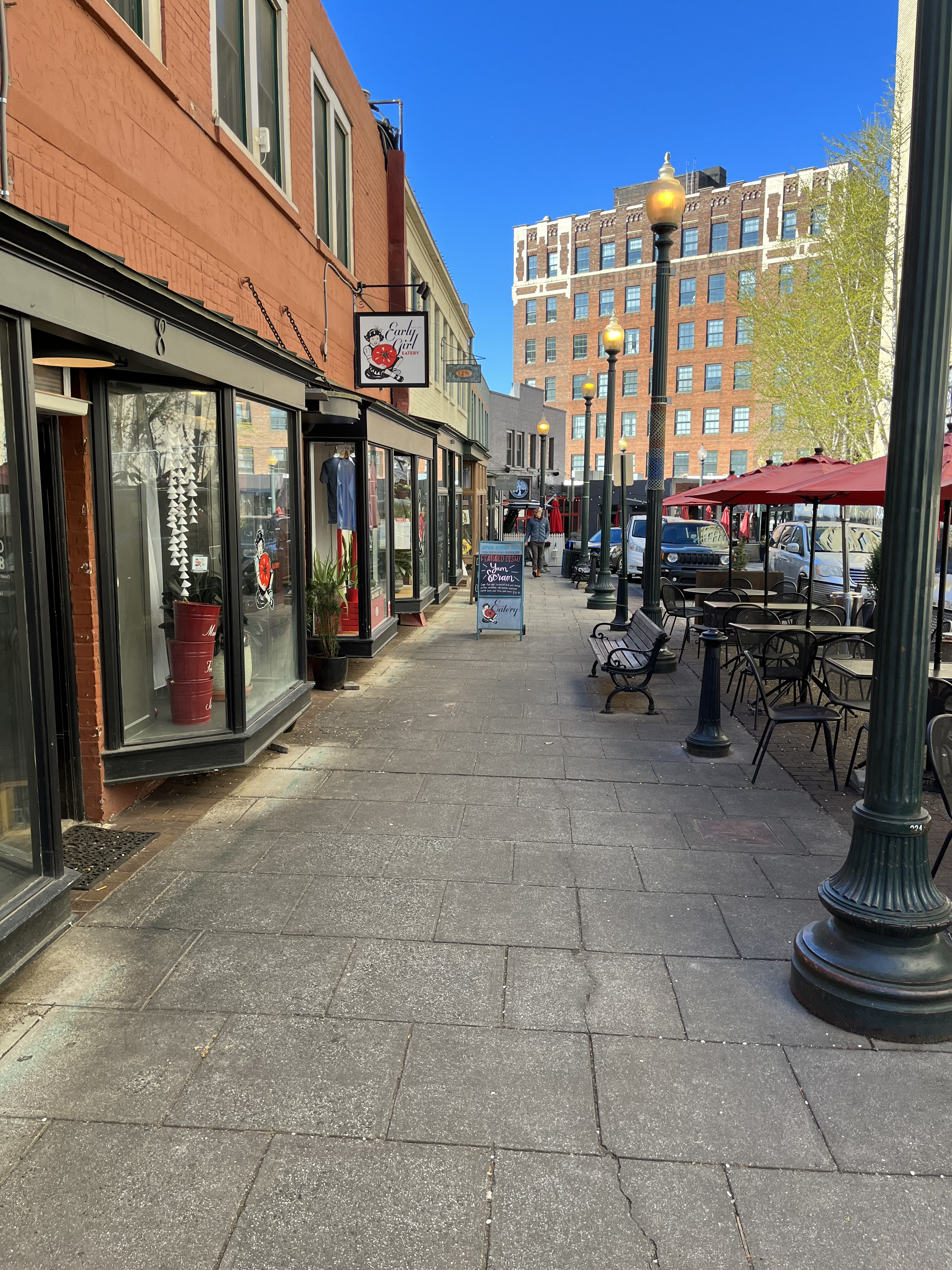
- Looking west towards the Public Use Building (2023)
- Length: 0.14 mi (0.23 km)
- Location: Asheville, North Carolina, U.S.
- West end: Otis Street
- East end: Battery Park Avenue

Wall Street is a thoroughfare in Asheville, North Carolina, United States. It runs for about 730 feet (240 yd) from Otis Street in the west to Battery Park Avenue in the east, and parallel to Battery Park Avenue to the north and Patton Avenue to the south. It has been referred to as a retail "woonerf," or "living street", and has been nicknamed The Little Street with Big Ideas.

It was originally an alley used for access to businesses, but was converted to use by traffic in the 1940s. Stores began to open, with their frontages facing onto the southern side of the street.

In the 1970s, a redevelopment of the street's character was undertaken to attract tourists and improve the amenities of pedestrians. Today, it is home to restaurants, stores and a climbing wall.

The seven-storey Public Service Building is located in the midsection of the street's southern side, while the Miles Building stands at the corner of Wall Street and Battery Park Avenue. Wall Street Parking Garage occupies a large part of the northern side of the street towards its eastern end.

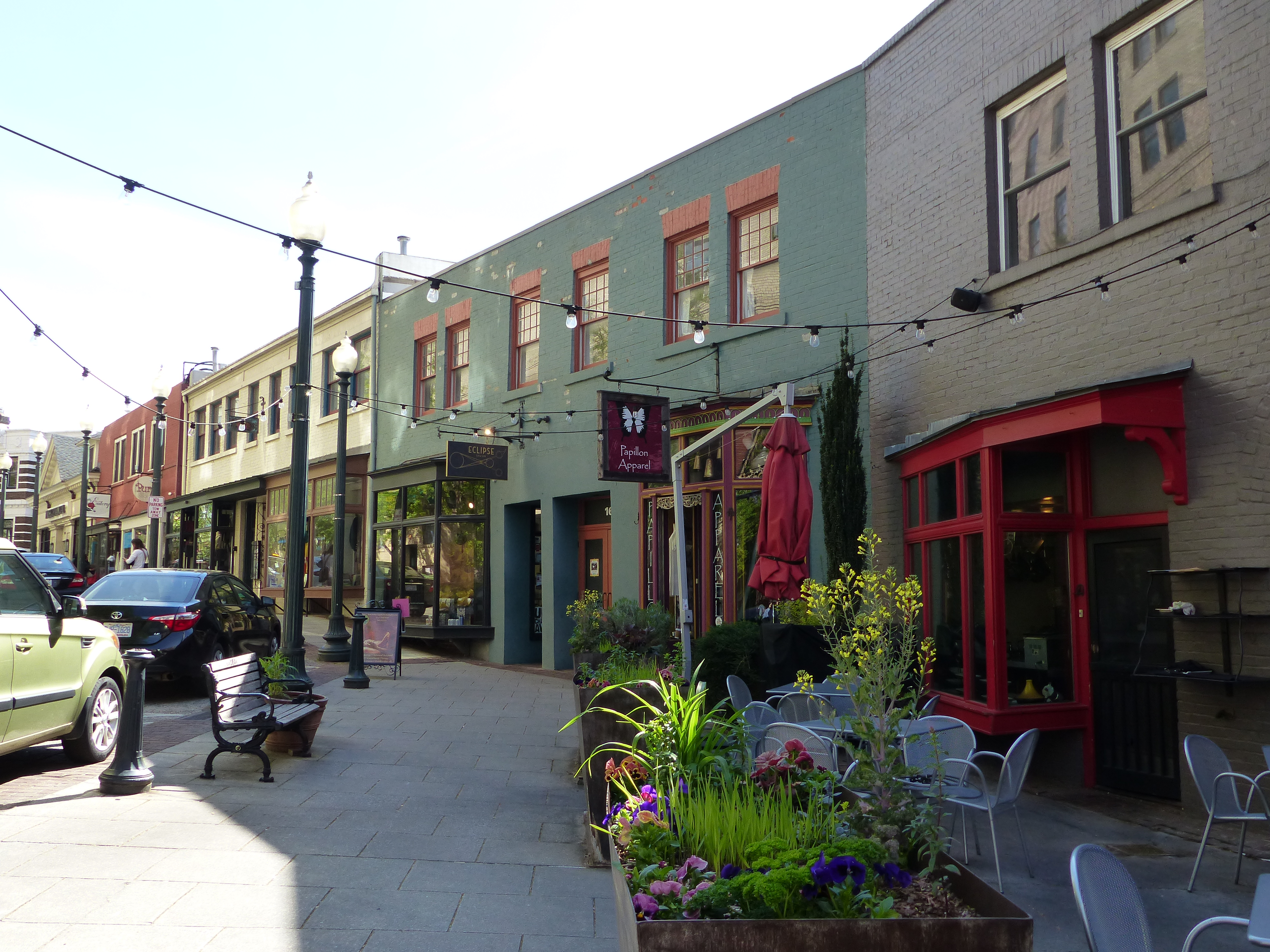
Looking east towards the Miles Building (2019)

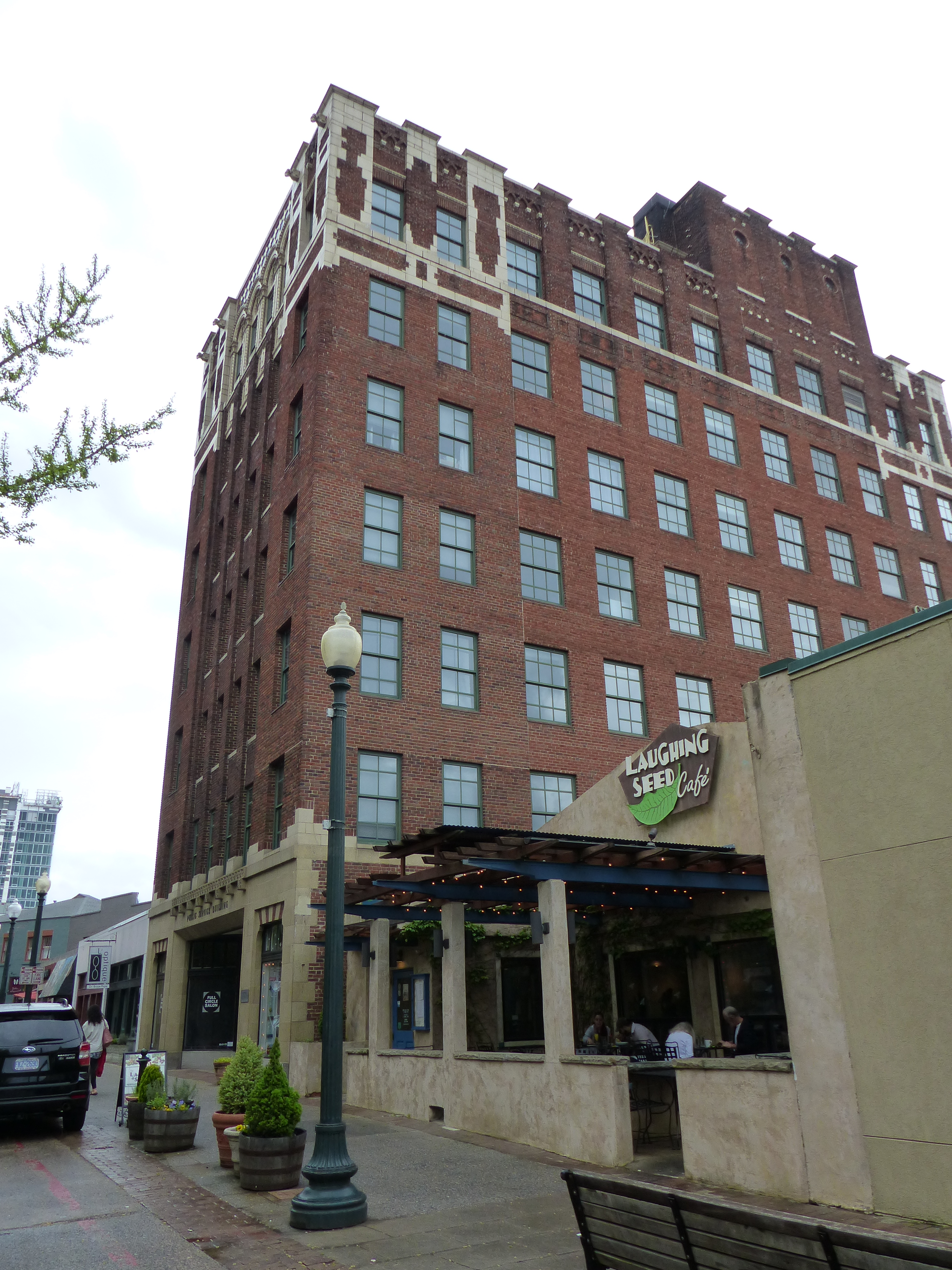
Public Service Building (2019)
