= Puzzle (Dada album) =

Studio album by dada
- Released: 1992
- Recorded: 1992
- Genre: Rock
- Length: 55:00
- Label: I.R.S.
- Producers: dada, Ken Scott

Dada chronology
Puzzle (1992)	American Highway Flower (1994)

Singles from Puzzle
- 1. "Dizz Knee Land" Released: 1992; 2. "Dog" Released: 1993; 3. "Dim" Released: 1993; 4. "Here Today, Gone Tomorrow" Released: 1993; 5. "Dorina" Released: 1993

Puzzle is the debut album by the American band dada, released in 1992 on I.R.S. Records. It contains the hit single "Dizz Knee Land". The album peaked at No. 111 on the Billboard 200. On July 13, 2004, the album was reissued with bonus tracks by Blue Cave Records.

A limited vinyl pressing of 2,000 copies was released as part of Record Store Day 2025.

== Critical reception ==
Professional ratings
Review scores
Source	Rating
AllMusic	4.5/5 stars
The Indianapolis Star	3.5/5 stars

Trouser Press noted that "the prevailing sensibility of Puzzle is skepticism about the Southern California dream and its undersides." The Philadelphia Daily News wrote that "Dada mines a West Coast po-mo sensibility with its Los Angeles imagery, sunny tunes and radio-friendly vocal harmonies." The Indianapolis Star said that "'Dorina' is pure craftsmanship, a tale of a barfly with a fantasy woman, perfectly expressed by spare, biting guitar with occasional breaks of scorching rock."

== Track listing ==
- 1992 I.R.S. Records Edition (Original release)

All songs written by Joie Calio and Michael Gurley except as noted.

1. "Dorina" – 6:06
2. "Mary Sunshine Rain" (Calio, Gurley, Phil Leavitt) – 4:39
3. "Dog" – 4:13
4. "Dizz Knee Land" (Calio, Gurley, Leavitt)– 4:06
5. "Surround" – 3:38
6. "Here Today, Gone Tomorrow" – 4:42
7. "Posters" – 4:05
8. "Timothy" – 4:00
9. "Dim" (Calio, Gurley, Leavitt) – 4:21
10. "Who You Are" – 3:24
11. "Puzzle" (Calio, Gurley, Leavitt) – 6:20
12. "Moon" - 5:18
- 2004 Blue Cave Records Edition (Reissued release)
1. "Dorina"
2. "Mary Sunshine Rain"
3. "Dog"
4. "Dizz Knee Land"
5. "Surround"
6. "Here Today, Gone Tomorrow"
7. "Posters"
8. "Timothy"
9. "Dim"
10. "Who You Are"
11. "Puzzle"
12. "Moon"
13. "Colour" [Bonus Track]
14. "Opera" [Bonus Track]
15. "Little Way" [Bonus Track]
16. "Here Today, Gone Tomorrow" [Bonus Video]

== Personnel ==
dada

- Joie Calio – Guitars, bass, percussion, vocals
- Michael Gurley – Guitars, keyboards, vocals
- Phil Leavitt – Drums, percussion, vocals

Additional musicians

- Robert Becker – Viola
- Henry Corbett – Cello
- Bruce Dukov – Violin

Production

- Produced by dada and Ken Scott
- Recorded and engineered by Eddie Ashworth, Steve Cormier and Ken Scott
- Assistant engineers: Jan Hovet, Melissa Sewell
- Mixed by dada, Ken Scott and Eddie Ashworth
- Mastered by Stephen Marcussen
- Art direction and design by Dale Lavi
