= Dada (album) =

dada

Studio album by dada
- Released: September 8, 1998 [US]
- Genre: Rock, Alternative rock
- Label: MCA
- Producer: Danny Kortchmar with dada

Dada chronology
El Subliminoso (1996)	dada (1998)	How to Be Found (2004)

Dada is the fourth full-length studio album by alternative rock group dada, and their debut album for MCA Records. In the U.S., it was released on September 8, 1998. dada charted at number 32 on the Billboard Heatseeker Albums chart.

"California Gold" was released as the first single from the album. Later in 1998, "Information Undertow" was distributed to radio stations as a promotional single. As of 2019, the album had sold 25,000 copies in the United States according to Nielsen Soundscan.

== Track listing ==
1. "Information Undertow"
2. "Playboy In Outerspace"
3. "Where You're Going"
4. "California Gold"
5. "This Thing Together"
6. "Sweet Dark Angel"
7. "Goodbye"
8. "Beautiful Turnback Time Machine"
9. "Baby Really Loves Me"
10. "Spinning My Wheels"
11. "Outside"
12. "The Ballad Of Earl Grey And Chamomile"
13. "Agent's Got No Secret"
