= 7horse =

American rock and blues duo

7Horse is an American rock and blues duo formed in 2011 most notable for their song "Meth Lab Zoso Sticker" which was featured in Martin Scorsese's film The Wolf of Wall Street, in the second trailer and on the soundtrack. The group consists of Phil Leavitt (songwriter, drummer, and lead vocals) and Joie Calio (songwriter, guitars, bass, and vocals). Both are also members of the band dada.

Their first album, Let the 7Horse Run, was released in 2011. They toured extensively by themselves in 2012. In 2013, they toured as an opening act for the dada 20th Anniversary Tour.

In April 2014, the song "BlackJack Moon" from the album Let the 7Horse Run was used in a Canadian national television commercial for Jeep Wrangler called Limitations.

On June 10, 7Horse released Songs for a Voodoo Wedding, coinciding with St. Johns Eve, a Voodoo Holy Day celebration honoring Marie Laveau. A national tour followed.

On April 15, 2016, 7Horse released its third record, Livin' in a Bitch of a World. A national tour followed during April–May 2016. A Fall 2016 tour began in October 2016.

Several of their songs were used in season one, episode three of Amazon's The Grand Tour ("Opera, Art, and Donuts"), and "Meth Lab Zoso Sticker" and "Blackjack Moon" were featured in Ubisoft's 2018 game Far Cry 5.

In 2018, the band released their fourth album Superfecta on December 7.

In 2022, the band released their fifth album The Last Resort on October 28, 2022.

In December 2024, Leavitt confirmed that he and Calio would be begin working on a new 7Horse record.

In June of 2026 the band began social media teasers for their sixth record which will be released 7/24/2026. https://www.facebook.com/share/p/1AmF7rvyjq/

On October 16, 2026, 7Horse released its sixth record, DOOM SCROLL ECHO https://www.instagram.com/7horseband

== Discography ==
- Let the 7Horse Run (2011)
- Songs for a Voodoo Wedding (2014)
- Livin' in a Bitch of a World (2016)
- Superfecta (2018)
- The Last Resort (2022)
- Charlie No-Face (2026)
