= How to Be Found =

Studio album by dada
- Released: March 2, 2004 [US]
- Genre: Alternative rock
- Label: Blue Cave Records

Dada chronology
dada (1998)	How to Be Found (2004)

How to Be Found is the fifth full-length studio album by the alternative rock group Dada. In the United States, the album was released by Blue Cave Records on March 2, 2004. Blue Cave was also responsible for re-releasing dada's first three out-of-print albums (originally released by I.R.S. Records) later in 2004. While none of the material featured on How to Be Found had ever been commercially released, it technically wasn't a "new" album. It was actually a compilation album containing all the leftover songs from the MCA recording sessions that resulted in their 1998 self-titled album.

== Track listing ==
1. "The Next Train Out Of My Mind"
2. "It's All Mine"
3. "How To Be Found"
4. "Crumble"
5. "Nothing Like You"
6. "Guitar Girl"
7. "Any Day The Wind Blows"
8. "Blue Girl"
9. "My Life Could Be Different"
10. "What's Happening To Steven"
11. "I Wish You Were Here Now"
12. "Reason"
13. "Love Is a Weird Thing"
