= El Subliminoso =

Studio album by dada
- Released: April 2, 1996 [US]
- Recorded: at IRS Studios in 1995 by Scott Gordon and Adam Weiner
- Genre: Alternative rock
- Label: I.R.S. Records
- Producer: dada with Adam Weiner and Scott Gordon

Dada chronology
American Highway Flower (1994)	El Subliminoso (1996)	Dada (1998)

Singles from El Sublimnoso
- 1. "I Get High" Released: April 15, 1996

El Subliminoso is the third album by the alternative rock group dada, and their final album for I.R.S. Records. In the United States, the album was initially released in April 1996. On July 13, 2004, the album was reissued with bonus tracks by Blue Cave Records. The album has sold 36,000 copies to date according to Nielsen Soundscan.

== Track listing ==
- 1996 I.R.S. Records Edition (Original Release)
1. "Time Is Your Friend"
2. "Sick In Santorini"
3. "Bob The Drummer"
4. "I Get High"
5. "The Spirit Of 2009"
6. "Star You Are"
7. "A Trip With My Dad"
8. "You Won't Know Me"
9. "Rise"
10. "No One"
11. "The Fleecing Of America"
12. "Hollow Man"
- 2004 Blue Cave Records Edition (Reissued Release)
1. "Time Is Your Friend"
2. "Sick In Santorini"
3. "Bob The Drummer"
4. "I Get High"
5. "The Spirit Of 2009"
6. "Star You Are"
7. "A Trip With My Dad"
8. "You Won't Know Me"
9. "Rise"
10. "No One"
11. "The Fleecing Of America"
12. "Hollow Man"
13. "California Dreamin'" (originally performed by The Mamas & the Papas) [Bonus Track]
14. "Happy Day Violator" [Bonus Track]
15. "Mystery Date" [Bonus Track]
16. "Put Me Down" [Bonus Track]
