= American Highway Flower =

Studio album by dada
- Released: 1994
- Genre: Rock, pop, grunge, alternative rock
- Label: I.R.S. Records
- Producer: Jason Corsaro, dada

Dada chronology
| Puzzle (1992) | American Highway Flower (1994) | El Subliminoso (1996) |

American Highway Flower is the second album by the American band dada, released in 1994. "All I Am" peaked at No. 27 on the Billboard Modern Rock Tracks chart. The album sold more than 50,000 copies during its first year of release.

The band supported the album with a North American tour. The album was reissued in 2004, with bonus tracks, by Blue Cave Records. The album had sold 77,000 copies in the United States as of 2019 according to Nielsen Soundscan.

== Production ==
The album was produced by Jason Corsaro and the band. The songs were written by Joie Calio and Michael Gurley. The album's original title was Backyard Fruit. "Feet to the Sun" addresses suicide.

== Critical reception ==
Professional ratings
Review scores
| Source | Rating |
|---|---|
| AllMusic | 2/5 stars |
| Chicago Tribune | 3.5/4 stars |
| The Indianapolis Star | 3/4 stars |
| Milwaukee Sentinel | B |
| Windsor Star | B+ |

Trouser Press wrote that "the sweet harmonizing on '8 Track' is notable, but American Highway Flower feels too long by at least twenty minutes." The Indianapolis Star noted that "dada mixes a knack for fine pop with clever lyrics and traditional American guitar rock." The Washington Post thought that the "eclecticism seems a little too labored, and Dada is more often clever than committed."

The Milwaukee Sentinel determined that, "at their most satisfying, Dada reminds us of a Dire Straits for the '90s, thanks to Michael Gurley's artful guitar work." The St. Louis Post-Dispatch praised the "several concise and memorable pop tunes." The Star Tribune concluded that "Dada is full of all kinds of 1980s progressive-rock touchstones—from the two-part pop harmonies to the rocking guitar solos to the well-crafted hooks."

AllMusic wrote that the band's disciplined use of harmony is a rare find in the alt-rock world, and continues to define their sound."

== Track listing ==
- 1994 I.R.S. Records Edition (Original Release)
1. "Ask the Dust"
2. "Feet to the Sun"
3. "All I Am"
4. "Scum"
5. "Pretty Girls Make Graves"
6. "Gogo"
7. "Feel Me Don't You"
8. "Real Soon"
9. "S.F. Bar '63"
10. "8 Track"
11. "Green Henry"
12. "i"
13. "Heaven and Nowhere"
- 2004 Blue Cave Records Edition (Reissued Release)
1. "Ask the Dust"
2. "Feet to the Sun"
3. "All I Am"
4. "Scum"
5. "Pretty Girls Make Graves"
6. "Gogo"
7. "Feel Me Don't You"
8. "Real Soon"
9. "S.F. Bar '63"
10. "8 Track"
11. "Green Henry"
12. "i"
13. "Heaven and Nowhere"
14. "I'm Feeling Nothing" [Bonus Track]
15. "Little Insister" [Bonus Track]
16. "All American Suicide" [Bonus Track]
