= Billy Boy on Poison =

American rock band

- Origin: Los Angeles, California, U.S.
- Genres: Alternative rock, garage rock, glam punk, punk blues
- Years active: 2005-2011
- Labels: Universal Republic; Ironworks Music
- Past members: Dee Dee (Davis) Leduke; Ryan Wallengren; Jess Calcaterra; Greg West; Jacob Pillot; Julian Borrego; Ryan Alberts; Dashiell LeFrancis; Billy Wesley

Billy Boy on Poison was an American rock and roll band from Los Angeles, California. Andrew Leahy of AllMusic suggested the band was "[l]ike the glittery offspring of the New York Dolls", and they "create a debauched, glammy, gender-bending style of rock & roll". The band formed in 2005 by members Dee Dee (Davis) LeDuke, Ryan Wallengren, Dashiell LeFrancis and Jess Calcaterra. The band was managed by Blue Cave Entertainment Group, LLC (BCEG). In 2007, LeFrancis left the band & was replaced by guitarist Gregory West. After writing and recording with producer Chris Sorensen and songwriter Michael Gurley, and engineers Big Stu Brantley and Doug Messenger--- BCEG began shopping the band, and they were subsequently signed by Kiefer Sutherland and Jude Cole of Ironworks Music. In 2009, bass player Julian Borrego left Billy Boy on Poison, and after a rotating cast of bass players, the band settled with Jacob Pillot in December 2010.

At the same time the line-up was settled, Paul Lester at The Guardian featured them as a New Band of the Day. His summation, from April 30, 2009, said: "Every so often a band come along and promise, threaten even, to bring scuzzy glamour and outlaw allure back to rock'n'roll, to restore it to first principles". They made their first television appearance on Late Night with Jimmy Fallon on May 21, 2009, publicizing the upcoming album release. On July 7, 2009, their debut album, Drama Junkie Queen, was released to critical acclaim. Their single "On My Way" has been featured in promos for television shows including Gossip Girl and Entourage, along with spots in several commercials, and finally on the soundtrack for the 2011 video game Driver: San Francisco. In addition, the group opened for Jet, Stone Temple Pilots, and Weezer.

Their name originates from a mis-quote in the novel and film A Clockwork Orange. The actual quote refers to a gang led by a man named Billy Joe, to whom Alex, the protagonist, refers to collectively as "Billy Boy and Poison".

On March 13, 2011, the band announced via their Twitter account that they had officially broken up and would no longer play together.

== Line-up ==
- Davis LeDuke (lead vocals)
- Ryan Wallengren (guitar, keys, vocals)
- Jess Calcaterra (drums)
- Greg West (guitar, vocals)
- Jacob Pillot (bass)

== Discography ==
=== Albums ===
- Sweet Mess EP (2008, Ironworks)
- Drama Junkie Queen (2009, Ironworks)

=== Singles ===
- "On My Way" (2009)
- "Angry Young Man" (2009)
- "4 Leaf Clover" (2010)
