= WGTB =

Internet radio station at Georgetown University

WGTB is a student-run internet radio station at Georgetown University in Washington, D.C.

== History ==
The station was founded as an AM station in 1946 by the Reverend Francis J. Heyden, S.J., and moved to FM in 1960. In the late 1960s and through the 1970s, the station attracted attention in the Washington, D.C. area for its blend of alternative rock. Its tag line was "WGTB, one nation underground". Strong left-wing sentiments, especially ads for the Washington Free Clinic, caused significant friction between the station's staff and the school's administration. Fr. Timothy Healy, SJ, Georgetown's president, donated the 6,700-watt signal, broadcasting at 90.1 MHz, to the University of the District of Columbia in 1979 for the sum of one dollar. UDC sold the signal to C-SPAN in 1997 for $25 million. That incarnation of the station is now WCSP-FM.

== WROX-AM (carrier current) ==
In 1982, a new student staff founded a new college radio station, as WROX-AM, an album-oriented rock format broadcasting to individual campus buildings over carrier current at 690 AM. The station reverted to its WGTB call sign in 1985, and moved to an alternative format.

== Leavey Center ==
After the move from studios in the Copley dormitory basement to the Leavey Center in 1996, the station broadcast via a "leaky cable" FM system at 92.3 MHz, also intended to ensure that the station could only broadcast around the campus and its immediate environs. Since 2001, WGTB's content has been available exclusively over the web. Broadcasts can be heard every day from 8 a.m. to 2 a.m.

== Staff ==
Serena Korkmaz is the General Manager. Eloise Owen and Mary-Grace Yaeger are the Promotional Directors. Anya Gizis is the Director of Marketing. Maxwell Keeney is the Director of Music. Savannah Benko is the Director of Events. Katie Hawkinson is the Web Director. Jamie Hood and Aleida Olvera are the Director of Technology. Peter Lorio is the Director of Programming.

== WGAY (internet radio) ==
WGAY, is a gay-oriented eclectic internet radio station, via live365. WGAY first signed on in February 2006, evolving from a Washington, DC "Part 15" (low-power) broadcast radio station, that was founded in 1991.

On Wednesdays, WGAY broadcasts archived airchecks of WGTB from the 1970's. Hundreds of hours of WGTB were recorded by various listeners, of whom, several have allowed WGAY to borrow and digitally dub these tapes. WGTB was a controversial student-run station at Georgetown University. Georgetown University, the Jesuit school, shut down because of the controversial programming the station carried.
