= Dada (band) =

American rock band

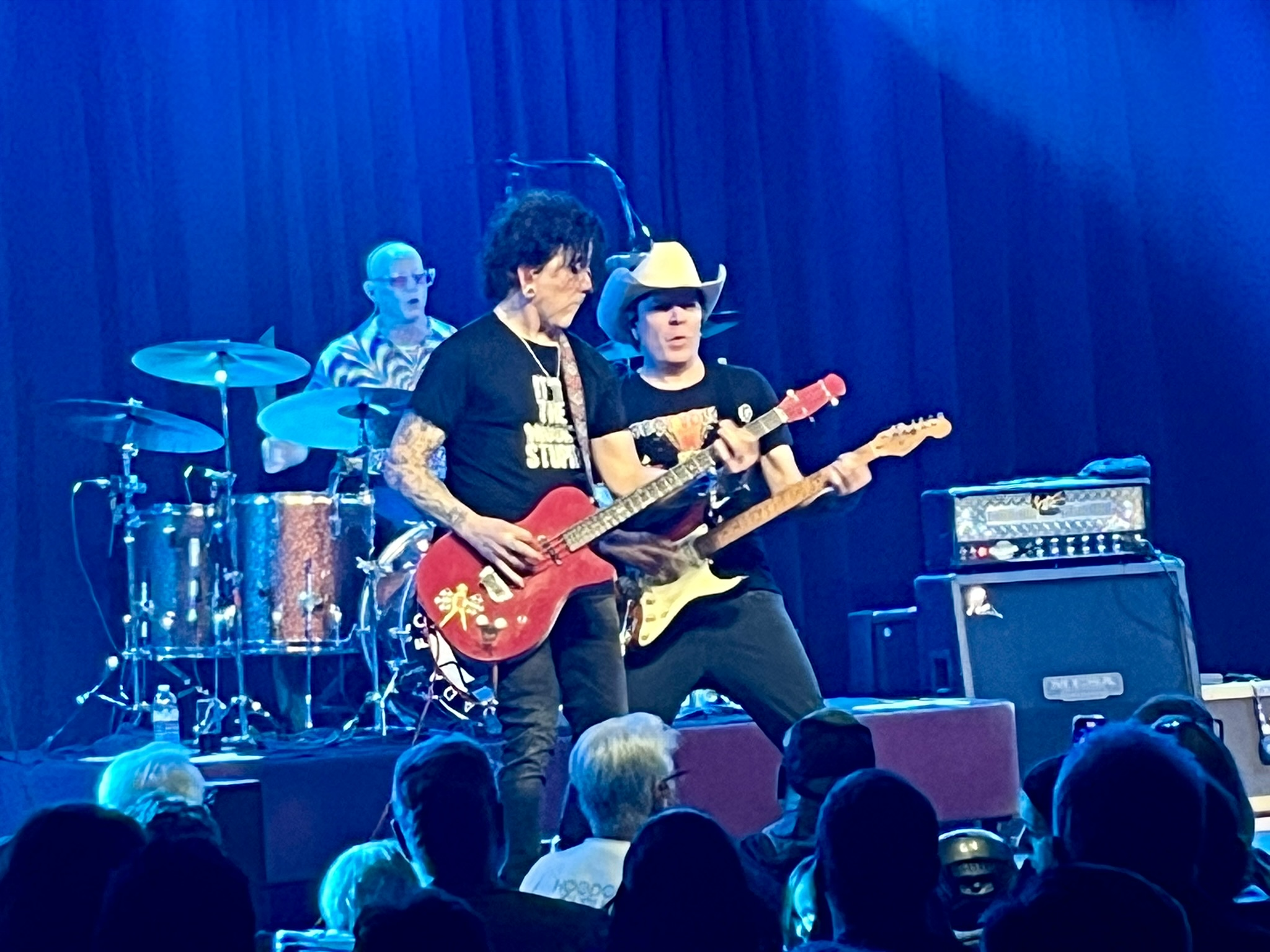
- Dada in San Juan Capistrano 2024

Background information
- Origin: Los Angeles, California, United States
- Genre: Alternative rock
- Years active: 1992–1999, 2003–present
- Labels: I.R.S. Records, MCA Records, Geffen Records
- Members: Michael Gurley; Joie Calio; Phil Leavitt
- Website: dadaforever.com

Dada (stylized dada) is a three piece rock band from California (United States). The band is made up of Michael Gurley (guitar/co-lead vocals), Joie Calio (bass/co-lead vocals) and Phil Leavitt (drums).

The band's songs feature both Michael and Joie sharing the vocals on each song. The group write highly melodic, harmony laden tunes, and their constant touring with two and a half to three hour performances has won them a wide fanbase.

== History ==
1992 saw the release of their debut album Puzzle. First single "Dizz Knee Land" quickly became a staple of radio across the U.S. and reached as far as Australia, where the song and album went on high rotation on national radio station Triple J. "Dizz Knee Land" reached number 2 on the Billboard Heatseekers chart, number 5 on the Billboard Modern Rock chart and number 27 on the Billboard Mainstream Rock Chart; Puzzle went on to sell more than half a million copies and earned an RIAA Gold Record award. dada toured for the album with bands such as Crowded House and Izzy Stradlin & the Ju Ju Hounds, as well as Sting.

They released the follow-up in 1994, American Highway Flower. Though the first single from that album "All I Am" spent eight weeks in the modern rock charts their record label at the time (I.R.S. Records) began to collapse. By the release of their third album El Subliminoso in 1996, I.R.S. Records had all but folded. In 1997 the band signed to MCA Records and, in 1998, released their fourth full-length studio album simply titled dada. Their bad luck with record companies continued as the parent company of MCA was sold. They continued touring throughout the U.S. In 1999 the band decided to have a break and played their supposedly final show in Norfolk, Virginia in front of 14,000 fans.

During their break Joie Calio worked as an A&R scout for MCA Records and wrote a book. Soon afterwards he released his debut solo album The Complications of Glitter. Michael Gurley and Phil Leavitt formed the band Butterfly Jones and they released the album Napalm Springs. Phil Leavitt also had a short stint with the Blue Man Group during this time.

2003 saw the return of dada. They began playing live shows again and recorded one of them in Santa Ana, California. They released the show on CD, titled Dada Live: Official Bootleg (Vol. 1). They spent seven weeks touring the CD across the US. In 2004, dada released their fifth album How To Be Found. Technically, How To Be Found was not a "new" album, but merely a compilation album that gathered all the leftover songs from the highly productive sessions that produced their 1998 self-titled album dada. They once again toured extensively across the US. Dada spent much of 2005 working on their next studio album, playing just three gigs during November. They played selected dates mainly on the East Coast of America during February–April 2006.

During much of the band's tenure, Michael Gurley has struggled with carpal tunnel syndrome. In order to continue playing, Gurley was forced to make some changes - these included using light gauge strings and tuning the instrument down a half step, as well as icing his wrists frequently to help with the pain.

In November 2006, the band released an EP titled A Friend Of Pat Robertson. They commenced 2007 with shows at the Whisky a Go Go in Los Angeles followed by shows in Milwaukee, Chicago and Minneapolis in April.

In June 2008, Joie Calio released a second solo record under the moniker X Levitation Cult which was titled Happiness in Hell. In 2010 Calio released a third solo record (using his name this time) titled Black Art of Blue.

On May 3, 2010, Joie Calio posted on his Facebook profile that "Dada is actually recording a new record - really! It's sounding good too. We've decided to stay focused on the writing/recording of this new record for now and hold off on any big tour plans". The band began a club tour later in the year. For unknown reasons, work came to a standstill on the new dada album in 2010 and to date, none of the recordings from those sessions have been released.

In 2011, using studio time originally booked for dada, Joie Calio and Phil Leavitt recorded a new album together under the name 7Horse. The debut 7Horse album, titled Let The 7Horse Run, was independently released late in 2011, and a tour of the U.S. followed early in 2012. In 2013 Martin Scorsese featured the 7Horse song "Meth Lab Zoso Sticker" in his movie The Wolf of Wall Street. It was also used in multiple trailers for the film and is on the movie soundtrack. In 2014 7Horse released its second record Songs For a Voodoo Wedding. That year they toured opening for Kenny Wayne Shepherd and later Whiskey Meyers. in 2016 7Horse released its third record Living In a Bitch of a World. They subsequently toured that year headlining in the U.S.

Late in 2012, dada announced an extensive "20th Anniversary Tour" of the U.S. that began in January 2013. It was also announced that 7Horse would be the opener for all shows.

In February 2017, dada embarked on its 25th Anniversary Tour of the U.S.

In 2017, dada released a single on limited edition vinyl consisting of two new songs titled "The Bluebird" and "Take Me To The Song".

Michael Gurley released an album "Ultrasound" in 2020 and Campfire Singin' Cowboy in 2023. Calio & Leavitt continue with their band 7Horse, beginning work on new material in 2025.

On December 8, 2023, on the (official Facebook group page) "Dada Forever" the "Return to dizz knee land" tour was announced playing venues in U.S. cities. Starting on February 24, 2024, in San Juan Capistrano, California and ended at Pappy & Harriet's in Pioneertown, CA on January 18, 2025.

== Discography ==
=== Studio albums ===
Year	Title	Chart positions
Year	Title	US
1992	Puzzle	111
1994	American Highway Flower	178
1996	El Subliminoso	-
1998	Dada	-
2004	How to Be Found	-

=== EPs ===
- A Friend of Pat Robertson (self-released, 2006)

=== Live albums ===
- Live: Official Bootleg (Vol.1) (Coach House Records, 2003)

=== Singles ===
Year	Title	Chart positions				Album
Year	Title	US	US Rock	US Alt	UK	Album
1992	"Dizz Knee Land"	102	27	5	85	Puzzle
1993	"Dog"	-	-	-	71	Puzzle
1993	"Dim"	-	-	24	92	Puzzle
1993	"Here Today, Gone Tomorrow"	-	-	-	-	Puzzle
1993	"Dorina"	-	-	-	-	Puzzle
1993	"My Baby Fell for Ol' St. Nick"	-	-	-	-	non-album single
1994	"All I Am"	-	-	27	-	American Highway Flower
1994	"Feet to the Sun"	-	-	-	-	American Highway Flower
1994	"Feel Me Don't You"	-	-	-	-	American Highway Flower
1995	"I'm Feeling Nothing"	-	-	-	-	The Brady Bunch Movie
1996	"I Get High"	-	-	-	-	El Subliminoso
1996	"Bob the Drummer"	-	-	-	-	El Subliminoso
1998	"California Gold"	-	-	-	-	Dada
1998	"Information Undertow"	-	-	-	-	Dada
1998	"Goodbye"	-	-	-	-	Dada
2017	"The Bluebird"	-	-	-	-	non-album single
2017	"Take Me to the Song"	-	-	-	-	non-album single
