= Wall Street Historic District (Norwalk, Connecticut) =

Historic district in Connecticut, United States

- U.S. National Register of Historic Places
- U.S. Historic district
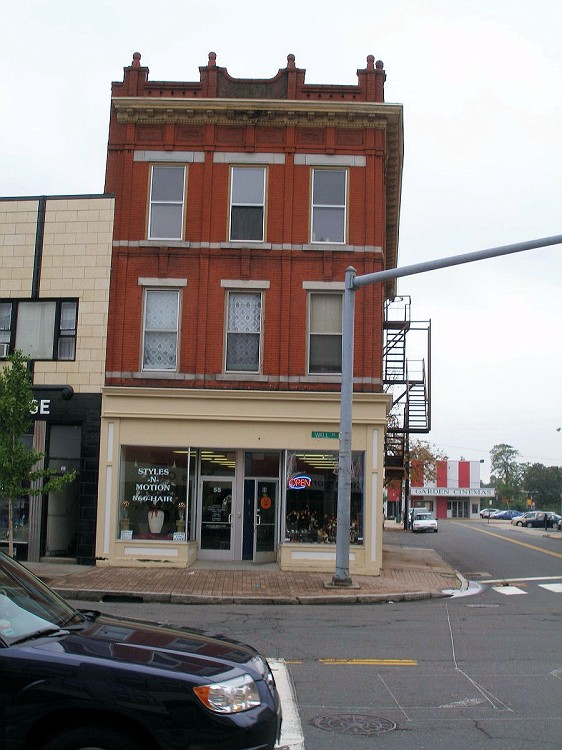
- Wall and Issacs Streets

- Location within Connecticut
- Location: Roughly bounded by Commerce, Knight, and Wall Streets, West and Mott Streets, Norwalk, CT
- Coordinates: 41°7′5.48″N 73°24′44.77″W
- NRHP reference No.: 09000342
- Added to NRHP: September 23, 2009

The Wall Street Historic District in Norwalk, Connecticut is a historic district that was listed on the National Register of Historic Places in 2009. The area encompasses the commercial and civic center of the Central Norwalk neighborhood, and includes 42 buildings, most of which are on the south side of Wall Street. Among the buildings included is an 1860 Gothic Revival church at the corner of Wall and Mott Streets.

== See also ==
- National Register of Historic Places listings in Fairfield County, Connecticut
