= Ken Scott (record producer) =

British record producer and engineer (born 1947)

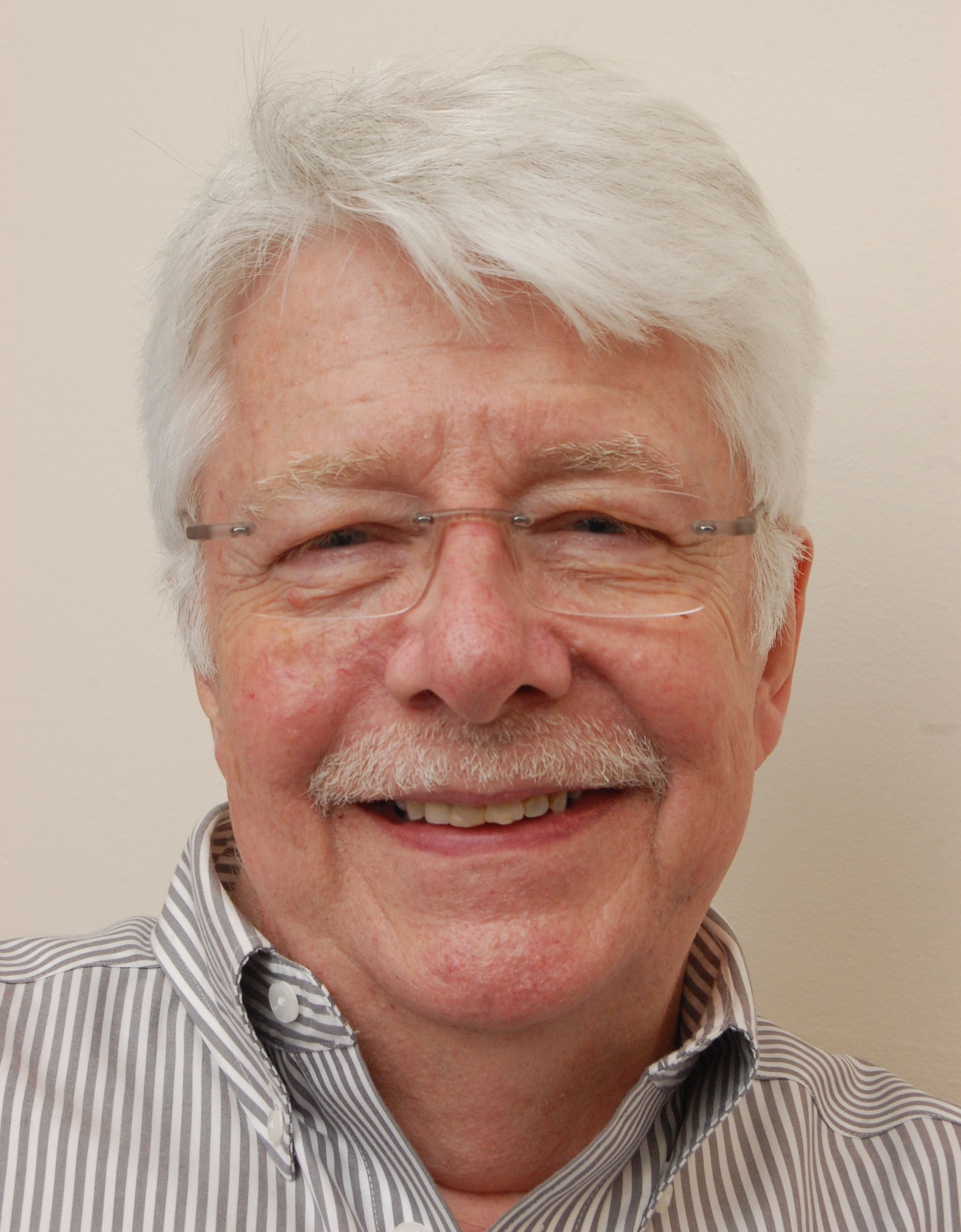
- Scott, 2014

Background information
- Born: 20 April 1947 (age 79); London, England
- Occupations: Record producer; engineer
- Years active: 1964–present
- Scott's voice recorded November 2014

Ken Scott (born 20 April 1947) is an English record producer and engineer known for being one of the five main engineers for the Beatles, as well as engineering Elton John, Pink Floyd, Procol Harum, the Mahavishnu Orchestra, Billy Cobham, David Bowie, Duran Duran, the Jeff Beck Group, Supertramp, and many more.

As a producer, Scott is noted for his work with Bowie, Supertramp, Devo, Kansas, the Tubes, Ronnie Montrose, Level 42, Missing Persons, among others.

Scott was also influential in the evolution of jazz rock, pioneering a harder rock sound through his work with Mahavishnu Orchestra, Stanley Clarke, Billy Cobham, Dixie Dregs, Happy the Man, and Jeff Beck.

== Career ==
=== Early years ===
Scott was born in London, and grew up listening to 78 rpm records of artists like Elvis Presley, Bill Haley, and Eddie Cochran on a wind-up gramophone. In 1959 at the age of 12, he received a tape recorder which he used to record material from the BBC Light Programme Pick of the Pops, but it was an episode of Here Come the Girls, an Alan Freeman-hosted TV show about British female pop artists in recording studios, that first focused Scott's career aspirations as a recording engineer when it featured Carol Deene singing in a recording session from the point of view of Studio Two at Abbey Road Studios, where Malcolm Addey was behind the recording console.

=== The Abbey Road years ===
On Saturday, 18 January 1964, Scott wrote letters inquiring about recording engineer job openings and mailed them to several London recording studios. Three days later he was contacted by Abbey Road Studios and subsequently interviewed and offered a position the following day. Scott began working the following Monday at the age of just 16. He received the traditional Abbey Road studio training under engineers like Malcolm Addey and Norman Smith. His first job was in the tape library, and within six months he was promoted to 2nd engineer (known then as a "button pusher"), where his first session was on side two of the Beatles' album A Hard Day's Night.

Among the other artists he worked with as a button pusher were Manfred Mann ("Do Wah Diddy Diddy" was the first UK number one single he worked on), Peter and Gordon, the Hollies, Judy Garland, Johnny Mathis, Cliff Richard and the Shadows, and Peter Sellers.

After a short time as an assistant engineer, Scott was promoted to "cutting" (known as mastering today), where he spent approximately two years cutting not only acetates for artists, but the masters for many of the hits that EMI also distributed at the time, including the American Motown catalogue.

In September 1967, Scott was promoted to engineer, where his first session was with the Beatles on their song "Your Mother Should Know". His first orchestral recording session came a few days later when he recorded the strings, brass and choir for the band's song "I Am the Walrus". During his time with the Beatles, Scott also worked on the songs "Lady Madonna", "Hello, Goodbye" and "Hey Jude", as well as The Beatles and Magical Mystery Tour albums. Among the notable songs from those albums that he worked on are "The Fool on the Hill", "Glass Onion", "Helter Skelter", "Birthday", "Back in the U.S.S.R.", "While My Guitar Gently Weeps" and "Not Guilty", the last of which was recorded for the White Album, but not included on it.

As an engineer at Abbey Road, Scott also worked with numerous other artists including the Jeff Beck Group, Pink Floyd, the Pretty Things, Scaffold and Mary Hopkin. In late 1969, shortly after completion of the Procol Harum album A Salty Dog, he left Abbey Road for Trident Studios, at the suggestion of Elton John and producer Gus Dudgeon.

=== The Trident years ===
Scott worked with the Beatles on their various solo projects, including John Lennon's "Give Peace a Chance" and "Cold Turkey", Ringo Starr's "It Don't Come Easy", and George Harrison's All Things Must Pass.

After a short time he took over the mixing of Elton John's Madman Across the Water, after fellow Trident engineer Robin Geoffrey Cable suffered severe injuries in a traffic accident. That led him to work on John's Honky Château and Don't Shoot Me I'm Only the Piano Player.

Also during this period he reconnected with David Bowie (he had previously worked on Bowie's 1969 self-titled album and The Man Who Sold the World) on a project with Bowie protege Freddie Burretti. By this time Scott wanted to move into production, and Bowie said he was about to start a new album and didn't feel comfortable about solely producing himself, so it was agreed that they would co-produce what became Hunky Dory. After the album was completed, but before it was even released, work began on his next album – The Rise and Fall of Ziggy Stardust and the Spiders from Mars – again with Scott as co-producer. Scott went on to co-produce Bowie's Aladdin Sane and Pin Ups albums, as well as the little-seen Midnight Special television program episode "The 1980 Floor Show".

During his time at Trident Studios, Scott also teamed up with Supertramp for Crime of the Century, which was a breakthrough album nearly everywhere in the world except the United States. The album featured two of the band's best-known songs, "Dreamer" and "Bloody Well Right."

The follow-up, Crisis? What Crisis?, attempted to reach those same sonic heights, but it was subject to the limitations of a timetable, because Supertramp had gained a measure of stardom, and a release date and tour had already been planned. The album was also recorded at other studios besides Trident, including Studio D at A&M Records in Hollywood, the Who's Ramport Studios, and the now defunct Scorpio Studios.

Other artists Scott worked with while at Trident included America, Harry Nilsson, Lou Reed, Rick Wakeman, the Rolling Stones, Al Kooper and Lindisfarne. Scott was also responsible for the Clio-winning Coca-Cola advert "I'd Like to Buy the World a Coke". Interviewed for tapeop.com, in 2024, Scott said: "I only ever did one ad, and that ad was I'd Like to Buy the World a Coke. ... It got a Clio [award] for it and the whole thing. That was the only ad I ever had to do. ... Yeah, they took the track we did, edited it, and then re-did the vocals without Coca-Cola."

=== Jazz rock ===
Scott also helped change the sound of the cross-pollination genre known as jazz rock or progressive jazz, adding a much harder edge rock sound (especially to the drums) to albums like Mahavishnu Orchestra's Birds of Fire, Visions of the Emerald Beyond and The Lost Trident Sessions, Billy Cobham's Spectrum, Crosswinds, Total Eclipse, and Shabazz, Stanley Clarke's Stanley Clarke and School Days, and Jeff Beck's There and Back.

Although not strictly jazz nor progressive rock, he also worked with the southern fusion band Dixie Dregs (What If and Night of the Living Dregs) and the symphonic progressive band Happy the Man (Happy the Man and Crafty Hands).

=== Los Angeles ===
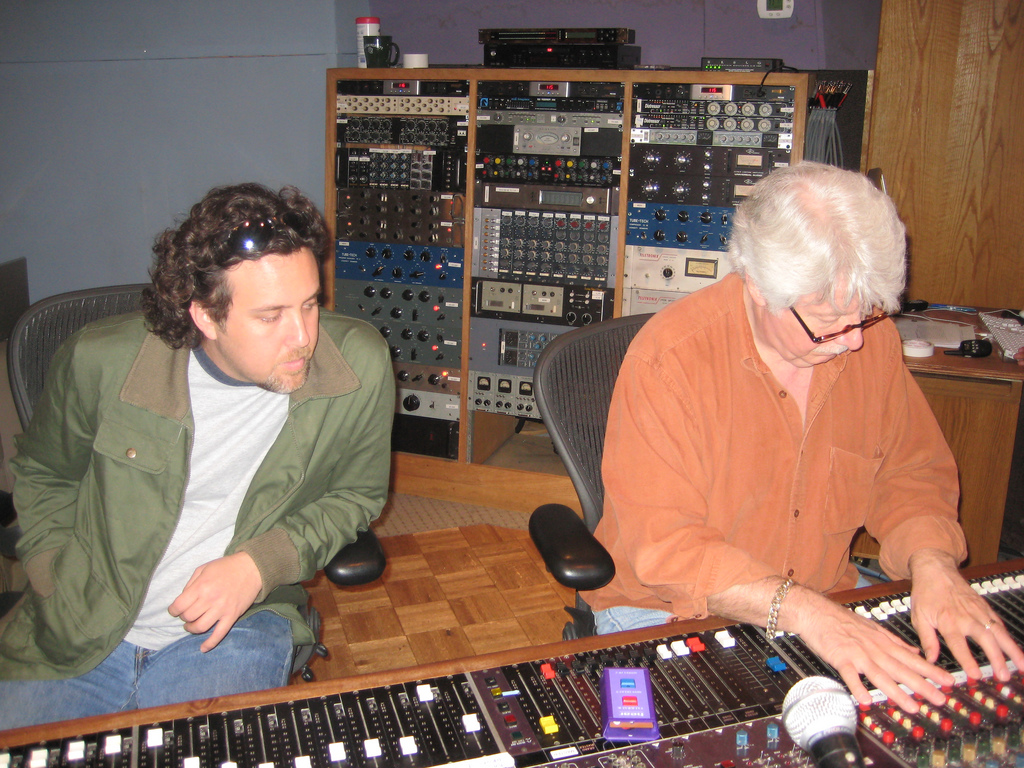
Scott (right) with musician Dave Kerzner

After spending three months in Hollywood recording Supertramp on the A&M lot, and receiving more production work from the company as a result of the success of Supertramp, Scott decided to permanently move his family to Los Angeles in 1976, just by chance renting a house down the street from Frank Zappa. Subsequent to that move he produced albums with David Batteau, the Tubes, Devo, Kansas, Level 42, Dada and others.

At the behest of Zappa's wife Gail, Scott was asked to check out a demo featuring ex-members of Frank's band, Terry Bozzio and Warren Cuccurullo, along with Bozzio's wife Dale, who had formed a band eventually to be named Missing Persons. With Scott at the helm, and thanks to massive airplay from the fledgling rock radio station KROQ, the band went on to record one of the biggest selling EPs ever, which eventually led to a deal with Capitol Records, which then released their first album, entitled Spring Session M. When the group was not able to find a suitable manager, Scott also assumed that role.

After "artistic differences" caused a split, he went on to produce and manage other acts including Christine in the Attic and Cock Robin, although neither went on to achieve the level of success of Missing Persons.

Scott's previous relationship with Warren Cuccurullo, who went on to join Duran Duran, led to his mixing an MTV Unplugged episode, as well as doing engineering work on the Thank You and Pop Trash albums.

In 2000, Scott reunited with former Beatle George Harrison to work on the reissue of his catalogue, included the huge hit All Things Must Pass. He was also responsible for the organisation of Harrison's entire tape library during that period.

=== Current work ===
Scott continues to be active in the studio and gives talks around the world. In 2012, he released a memoir entitled Abbey Road To Ziggy Stardust, co-written with Bobby Owsinski and published by Alfred Music Publishing.

Scott is currently a Senior Professor at Leeds Beckett University's School of Film, Music and Performing Arts.

== Personal life ==
Originally from South London, Scott resided in Los Angeles from 1976 to 2013, then relocated to Nashville. In 2015, he and his wife, Cheryl, moved to Harrogate, North Yorkshire, in the UK.

== Awards and recognition ==
- 2010 – Fellowship Award from the Association of Professional Recording Services
- 1973 – Clio award – Best Music and Lyrics (for "I'd Like to Buy the World a Coke" recorded at Trident Studios for Coca-Cola)
- 1974 – Grammy Award nomination – Best Engineered Recording – Non Classical – Crime of the Century (album)
- 1972 – Grammy Award nomination – Best Engineered Recording – Non Classical – Honky Château
- 1972 – Grammy Award nomination – Best Engineered Recording – Non-Classical – Son of Schmilsson

== Engineering and production credits ==
Selected engineering and production credits:

- 1964: The Beatles – A Hard Day's Night (assistant engineer)
- 1964: The Beatles – Beatles for Sale (assistant engineer)
- 1965: The Beatles – Rubber Soul (assistant engineer)
- 1965: The Beatles – Help! (assistant engineer)
- 1967: The Beatles – Sgt. Pepper's Lonely Hearts Club Band (assistant engineer)
- 1967: The Beatles – Magical Mystery Tour (engineer)
- 1968: George Harrison – Wonderwall Music (engineer)
- 1968: Jeff Beck – Truth (engineer, audio engineer)
- 1968: The Beatles – The Beatles (engineer, original engineering)
- 1969: Principal Edwards Magic Theatre – Soundtrack (engineer)
- 1969: Mary Hopkin – Post Card (engineer, mixing)
- 1969: Jackie Lomax – Is This What You Want? (engineer)
- 1969: David Bowie – Space Oddity (engineer, audio engineer)
- 1969: Jeff Beck – Beck-Ola (engineer, audio engineer)
- 1969: Third Ear Band – Alchemy (engineer)
- 1969: Procol Harum – A Salty Dog (engineer)
- 1970: Warhorse – Warhorse (engineer)
- 1970: David Bowie – The Man Who Sold the World (engineer, audio engineer)
- 1970: Dada – Dada (engineer)
- 1970: George Harrison – All Things Must Pass (engineer)
- 1971: Radha Krsna Temple (London) – The Radha Krsna Temple (engineer, balance engineer)
- 1971: Van der Graaf Generator – Pawn Hearts (engineer)
- 1971: The New Seekers – New Colours (engineer)
- 1971: Elton John – Madman Across the Water (engineer, remixing)
- 1971: David Bowie – Hunky Dory (producer, engineer, remixing, spoken word, synthesizer, vocals)
- 1971: Mary Hopkin – Earth Song/Ocean Song (mixing)
- 1972: David Bowie – The Rise and Fall of Ziggy Stardust and the Spiders from Mars (producer, audio production, original album producer)
- 1972: Lou Reed – Transformer (engineer, mixing)
- 1972: Harry Nilsson – Son of Schmilsson (engineer, balance engineer)
- 1972: Elton John – Honky Château (engineer, audio engineer)
- 1972: America – America (engineer)
- 1973: Billy Cobham – Spectrum (engineer, remixing)
- 1973: Elton John – Don't Shoot Me I'm Only the Piano Player (engineer)
- 1973: Mahavishnu Orchestra – Birds of Fire (engineer)
- 1973: David Bowie – Aladdin Sane (producer, engineer, mixing)
- 1974: Billy Cobham – Crosswinds (producer, engineer, mixing, recording)
- 1974: Billy Cobham – Total Eclipse (producer, engineer, mixing)
- 1974: Stanley Clarke – Stanley Clarke (engineer)
- 1974: Supertramp – Crime of the Century (producer, engineer, mastering)
- 1975: Mahavishnu Orchestra – Visions of the Emerald Beyond (producer, engineer)
- 1975: Stanley Clarke – Journey to Love (producer, engineer)
- 1975: Supertramp – Crisis? What Crisis? (producer)
- 1976: Elton John – Don't Go Breaking My Heart (engineer)
- 1976: The Tubes – Young and Rich (producer)
- 1976: Stanley Clarke – School Days (producer, engineer)
- 1977: The Don Harrison Band – Not Far from Free (producer, engineer)
- 1978: Dixie Dregs – What If (producer, engineer)
- 1978: Happy the Man – Crafty Hands (producer, engineer)
- 1978: Dixie Dregs – Night of the Living Dregs (producer, engineer)
- 1979: Gamma – Gamma 1 (producer, engineer)
- 1979: Devo – Duty Now for the Future (producer, engineer)
- 1980: Jeff Beck – There & Back (producer)
- 1982: Kansas – Vinyl Confessions (producer, engineer)
- 1982: Missing Persons – Spring Session M (producer, engineer)
- 1984: Level 42 – True Colours (producer)
- 1985: Rubber Rodeo – Heartbreak Highway (producer, engineer)
- 1992: dada – Puzzle (producer, engineer, mixing)
- 1995: Duran Duran – Thank You (engineer)
- 1995: Whiteheart – Inside (producer, engineer)
- 1998: Missing Persons – Late Nights Early Days (producer, engineer)
- 1999: Mahavishnu Orchestra – The Lost Trident Sessions (engineer)
- 2000: Duran Duran – Pop Trash (engineer, mixing)
- 2006: The Beatles – Love (engineer)
- 2012: The Moog – Seasons in the Underground (producer, engineer, mixing)
