= Mount Holly, Vermont =

- Town
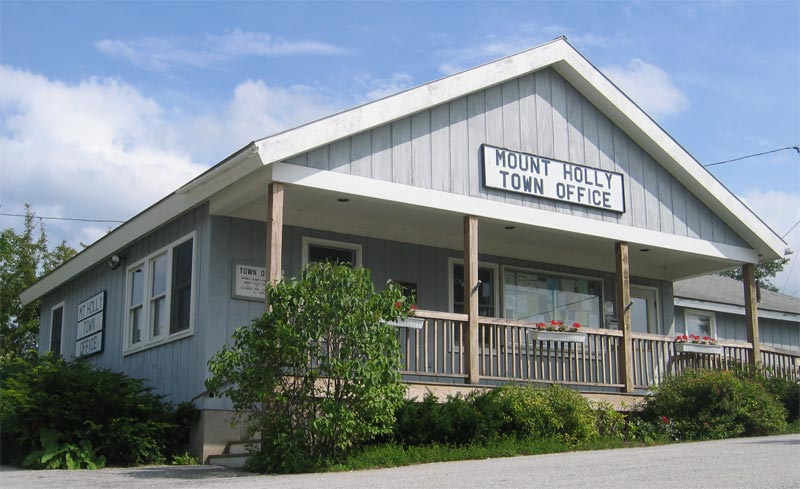
- Mount Holly town office

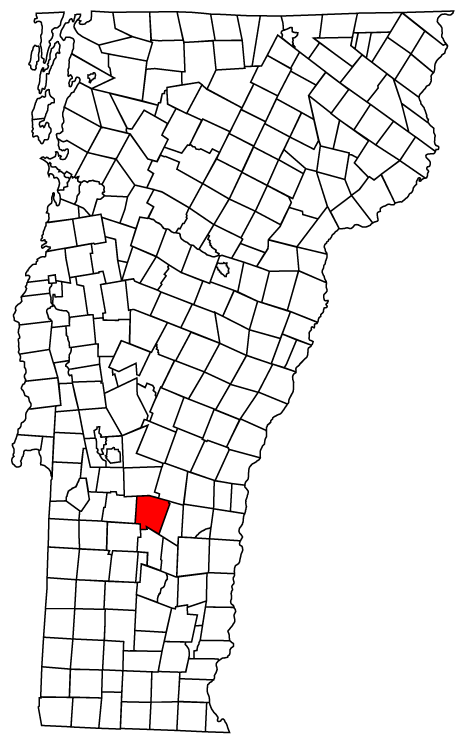
- Mount Holly, Vermont
- Coordinates: 43°24′12″N 72°48′15″W
- Country: United States
- State: Vermont
- County: Rutland
- Communities: Belmont; Bowlsville; Healdville; Hortonville; Mount Holly; Summit; Tarbellville

Area
  - Total: 49.6 sq mi (128.4 km^{2})
  - Land: 49.2 sq mi (127.4 km^{2})
  - Water: 0.39 sq mi (1.0 km^{2})
- Elevation: 1,854 ft (565 m)

Population (2020)
  - Total: 1,385
  - Density: 28.16/sq mi (10.87/km^{2})
- Time zone: UTC-5 (Eastern (EST))
  - Summer (DST): UTC-4 (EDT)
- ZIP Codes: 05758 (Mount Holly); 05730 (Belmont); 05742 (East Wallingford); 05738 (Cuttingsville)
- Area code: 802
- FIPS code: 50-47200
- GNIS feature ID: 1462155
- Website: www.mounthollyvt.org

Mount Holly is a town in Rutland County, Vermont, United States. It includes the hamlets of Belmont, Healdville, Hortonville, and Tarbellville. The population was 1,385 at the 2020 census.

== Geography ==
According to the United States Census Bureau, the town has a total area of 49.6 square miles (128 km^{2}), of which 49.2 square miles (127 km^{2}) is land and 0.4 square miles (1.0 km^{2}), or 0.77%, is water.

== Demographics ==
Historical population
Census	Pop.	Note	%±
1800	668		—
1810	922		38.0%
1820	1,157		25.5%
1830	1,318		13.9%
1840	1,356		2.9%
1850	1,534		13.1%
1860	1,522		−0.8%
1870	1,582		3.9%
1880	1,390		−12.1%
1890	1,214		−12.7%
1900	999		−17.7%
1910	871		−12.8%
1920	856		−1.7%
1930	727		−15.1%
1940	656		−9.8%
1950	567		−13.6%
1960	517		−8.8%
1970	687		32.9%
1980	938		36.5%
1990	1,093		16.5%
2000	1,241		13.5%
2010	1,237		−0.3%
2020	1,385		12.0%
U.S. Decennial Census

At the 2000 census there were 1,241 people, 494 households, and 341 families in the town. The population density was 25.2 people per square mile (9.7/km^{2}). There were 917 housing units at an average density of 18.6 per square mile (7.2/km^{2}). The racial makeup of the town was 97.99% White, 0.16% African American, 0.16% Native American, 0.16% Asian, 0.16% from other races, and 1.37% from two or more races. Hispanic or Latino of any race were 0.16%.

Of the 494 households 32.6% had children under the age of 18 living with them, 58.9% were married couples living together, 6.9% had a female householder with no husband present, and 30.8% were non-families. 22.7% of households were one person and 9.1% were one person aged 65 or older. The average household size was 2.51 and the average family size was 2.94.

The age distribution was 26.3% under the age of 18, 4.6% from 18 to 24, 30.9% from 25 to 44, 26.4% from 45 to 64, and 11.8% 65 or older. The median age was 39 years. For every 100 females, there were 103.1 males. For every 100 females age 18 and over, there were 102.9 males.

The median household income was $41,364 and the median family income was $44,821. Males had a median income of $31,761 versus $26,985 for females. The per capita income for the town was $20,337. About 5.5% of families and 9.7% of the population were below the poverty line, including 13.5% of those under age 18 and 11.0% of those age 65 or over.

== Notable people ==
- Julian Cook, US Army officer during World War II
- Horatio Earle, creator of the world's first mile of concrete road
- Joseph Kinney, Jr., Wisconsin legislator, was born in Mount Holly
- John McClure, record producer
- Hannah Teter, Olympic snowboarder
