= 1908 Michigan gubernatorial election =

- November 3, 1908
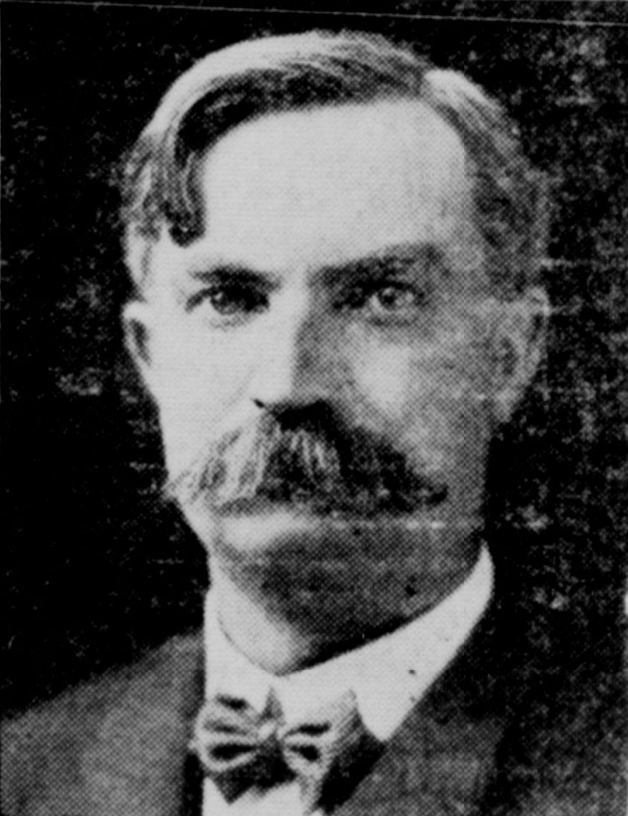

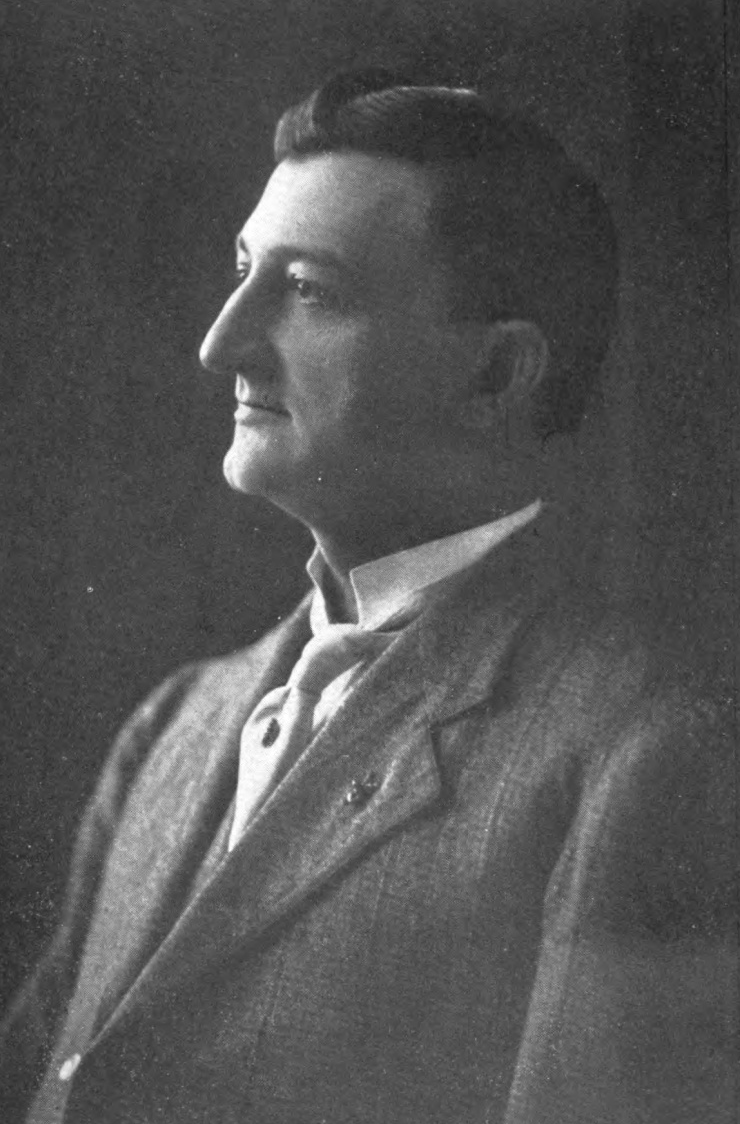
Nominee	Fred M. Warner	Lawton T. Hemans
Party	Republican	Democratic
Popular vote	262,141	252,611
Percentage	48.39%	46.63%
- County results Warner: 40–50% 50–60% 60–70% 70–80% 80–90% Hemans: 40–50% 50–60% 60–70% 70–80%
Governor before election
Fred M. Warner
Republican
Elected Governor
Fred M. Warner
Republican

The 1908 Michigan gubernatorial election was held on November 3, 1908. Incumbent Republican Fred M. Warner defeated Democratic candidate Lawton T. Hemans with 48.39% of the vote.

== Primary election ==
Michigan held primary elections for governor for the first time on September 1, 1908.

=== Republican party ===
Incumbent governor Fred M. Warner narrowly defeated Auditor General James B. Bradley.

==== Candidates ====
- James B. Bradley, Michigan Auditor General
- Horatio S. Earle, transport engineer
- Fred M. Warner, incumbent governor

==== Results ====
Republican primary results
Party	Candidate	Votes	%
Republican	Fred M. Warner (inc.)	87,719	43.66%
Republican	James B. Bradley	86,440	43.02%
Republican	Horatio S. Earle	26,752	13.31%
Republican	Scattering	13	0.01%
Total votes		200,924	100.00%

=== Democratic party ===
Lawton T. Hemans was unopposed for the Democratic nomination.

==== Candidates ====
- Lawton T. Hemans, former member of Michigan House of Representatives

==== Results ====
Democratic primary results
Party	Candidate	Votes	%
Democratic	Lawton T. Hemans	11,643	99.51%
Democratic	Scattering	57	0.49%
Total votes		11,700	100.00%

=== Minor parties ===
Prohibition primary results
Party	Candidate	Votes	%
Prohibition	John W. Gray	1,005	97.48%
Prohibition	Scattering	26	2.52%
Total votes		1,031	100.00%

Socialist primary results
Party	Candidate	Votes	%
Socialist	Alexander M. Stirton	361	91.62%
Socialist	Scattering	33	8.38%
Total votes		394	100.00%

Socialist Labor primary results
Party	Candidate	Votes	%
Socialist Labor	Archie McInnis	12	63.16%
Socialist Labor	Scattering	7	36.84%
Total votes		19	100.00%

== General election ==
=== Candidates ===
Major party candidates

- Fred M. Warner, Republican
- Lawton T. Hemans, Democratic

Other candidates

- John W. Gray, Prohibition
- Alexander M. Stirton, Socialist
- Archie McInnis, Socialist Labor
- Alva W. Nichols, Independence

=== Results ===
1908 Michigan gubernatorial election
Party	Candidate	Votes	%	±%
Republican	Fred M. Warner (inc.)	262,141	48.39%	−12.49%
Democratic	Lawton T. Hemans	252,611	46.63%	+11.85%
Prohibition	John W. Gray	16,092	2.97%	+0.53%
Socialist	Alexander M. Stirton	9,447	1.74%	+0.16%
Socialist Labor	Archie McInnis	845	0.16%	−0.15%
Independence	Alva W. Nichols	612	0.11%	
	Scattering	19	0.00%	
Plurality		9,530	1.76%	
Total votes		541,767	100.00%	
Republican hold		Swing	-24.34%	

==== Results by county ====
Hillsdale County voted Democratic for the first time since 1852, making Warner the first Republican to lose that county since the party's establishment. This was the only election between 1890 and 1932 in which Muskegon County voted Democratic. This was also the first time since its organization in 1859 that Muskegon County failed to back the winning candidate.

County	Fred M. Warner Republican		Lawton T. Hemans Democratic		John W. Gray Prohibition		Alexander M. Stirton Socialist		Archie McInnis Socialist Labor		Alva W. Nichols Independence		Margin		Total votes cast
County	#	%	#	%	#	%	#	%	#	%	#	%	#	%	Total votes cast
Alcona	792	73.88%	205	19.12%	26	2.43%	48	4.48%	1	0.09%	0	0.00%	587	54.76%	1,072
Alger	971	73.45%	271	20.50%	21	1.59%	51	3.86%	2	0.15%	6	0.45%	700	52.95%	1,322
Allegan	4,451	55.24%	3,230	40.08%	250	3.10%	110	1.37%	10	0.12%	7	0.09%	1,221	15.15%	8,058
Alpena	2,104	60.18%	1,250	35.76%	30	0.86%	108	3.09%	2	0.06%	2	0.06%	854	24.43%	3,496
Antrim	1,695	61.04%	929	33.45%	95	3.42%	49	1.76%	4	0.14%	5	0.18%	766	27.58%	2,777
Arenac	971	50.00%	849	43.72%	52	2.68%	68	3.50%	2	0.10%	0	0.00%	122	6.28%	1,942
Baraga	756	68.98%	305	27.83%	19	1.73%	13	1.19%	1	0.09%	2	0.18%	451	41.15%	1,096
Barry	2,490	44.06%	2,907	51.44%	229	4.05%	16	0.28%	6	0.11%	3	0.05%	-417	-7.38%	5,651
Bay	5,905	51.14%	5,107	44.23%	163	1.41%	331	2.87%	24	0.21%	17	0.15%	798	6.91%	11,547
Benzie	1,216	53.08%	814	35.53%	189	8.25%	65	2.84%	5	0.22%	2	0.09%	402	17.55%	2,291
Berrien	6,520	51.87%	5,518	43.90%	223	1.77%	242	1.93%	24	0.19%	42	0.33%	1,002	7.97%	12,570 (Note: Includes 1 Scattering vote)
Branch	2,836	43.85%	3,343	51.69%	177	2.74%	90	1.39%	12	0.19%	9	0.14%	-507	-7.84%	6,467
Calhoun	4,951	40.42%	6,320	51.60%	383	3.13%	477	3.89%	79	0.64%	39	0.32%	-1,369	-11.18%	12,249
Cass	2,540	43.51%	3,041	52.09%	134	2.30%	106	1.82%	8	0.14%	9	0.15%	-501	-8.58%	5,838
Charlevoix	2,243	60.90%	1,133	30.76%	133	3.61%	155	4.21%	8	0.22%	11	0.30%	1,110	30.14%	3,683
Cheboygan	1,788	49.01%	1,661	45.53%	115	3.15%	72	1.97%	7	0.19%	5	0.14%	127	3.48%	3,648
Chippewa	2,114	55.07%	1,573	40.97%	114	2.97%	34	0.89%	1	0.03%	3	0.08%	541	14.09%	3,839
Clare	1,130	57.24%	788	39.92%	40	2.03%	14	0.71%	2	0.10%	0	0.00%	342	17.33%	1,974
Clinton	2,158	36.89%	3,544	60.58%	131	2.24%	11	0.19%	4	0.07%	2	0.03%	-1,386	-23.69%	5,850
Crawford	471	54.20%	370	42.58%	10	1.15%	18	2.07%	0	0.00%	0	0.00%	101	11.62%	869
Delta	3,164	70.14%	1,192	26.42%	70	1.55%	66	1.46%	11	0.24%	8	0.18%	1,972	43.72%	4,511
Dickinson	2,463	74.55%	594	17.98%	185	5.60%	39	1.18%	17	0.51%	6	0.18%	1,869	56.57%	3,304
Eaton	2,639	33.67%	4,951	63.17%	179	2.28%	59	0.75%	6	0.08%	4	0.05%	-2,312	-29.50%	7,838
Emmet	2,059	55.22%	1,281	34.35%	209	5.60%	178	4.77%	0	0.00%	2	0.05%	778	20.86%	3,729
Genesee	5,334	47.50%	5,194	46.26%	444	3.95%	237	2.11%	14	0.12%	6	0.05%	140	1.25%	11,229
Gladwin	1,029	62.48%	550	33.39%	40	2.43%	24	1.46%	3	0.18%	1	0.06%	479	29.08%	1,647
Gogebic	2,151	69.63%	726	23.50%	149	4.82%	52	1.68%	6	0.19%	5	0.16%	1,425	46.13%	3,089
Grand Traverse	2,225	51.85%	1,937	45.14%	103	2.40%	21	0.49%	2	0.05%	3	0.07%	288	6.71%	4,291
Gratiot	3,209	47.56%	3,363	49.84%	144	2.13%	25	0.37%	1	0.01%	5	0.07%	-154	-2.28%	6,747
Hillsdale	2,463	34.02%	4,475	61.81%	267	3.69%	26	0.36%	2	0.03%	7	0.10%	-2,012	-27.79%	7,240
Houghton	8,568	67.18%	3,102	24.32%	696	5.46%	365	2.86%	9	0.07%	13	0.10%	5,466	42.86%	12,754
Huron	3,381	63.17%	1,775	33.17%	143	2.67%	47	0.88%	5	0.09%	1	0.02%	1,606	30.01%	5,352
Ingham	3,194	25.45%	8,702	69.34%	507	4.04%	115	0.92%	0	0.00%	17	0.14%	-5,508	-43.89%	12,550 (Note: Includes 15 Scattering votes)
Ionia	3,544	42.17%	4,379	52.10%	402	4.78%	63	0.75%	7	0.08%	10	0.12%	-835	-9.93%	8,405
Iosco	970	49.92%	930	47.86%	34	1.75%	7	0.36%	1	0.05%	1	0.05%	40	2.06%	1,943
Iron	2,037	84.49%	292	12.11%	44	1.82%	20	0.83%	4	0.17%	14	0.58%	1,745	72.38%	2,411
Isabella	2,427	48.29%	2,450	48.75%	116	2.31%	31	0.62%	0	0.00%	2	0.04%	-23	-0.46%	5,026
Jackson	3,240	26.00%	8,843	70.95%	281	2.25%	84	0.67%	8	0.06%	7	0.06%	-5,603	-44.96%	12,463
Kalamazoo	4,931	41.03%	6,267	52.14%	425	3.54%	360	3.00%	18	0.15%	18	0.15%	-1,336	-11.12%	12,019
Kalkaska	951	56.47%	609	36.16%	82	4.87%	39	2.32%	2	0.12%	1	0.06%	342	20.31%	1,684
Kent	9,979	33.03%	18,837	62.36%	609	2.02%	718	2.38%	52	0.17%	13	0.04%	-8,858	-29.32%	30,208
Keweenaw	1,008	88.89%	80	7.05%	19	1.68%	25	2.20%	2	0.18%	0	0.00%	928	81.83%	1,134
Lake	620	63.33%	320	32.69%	13	1.33%	23	2.35%	3	0.31%	0	0.00%	300	30.64%	979
Lapeer	3,029	55.82%	2,072	38.19%	294	5.42%	28	0.52%	0	0.00%	3	0.06%	957	17.64%	5,426
Leelanau	977	51.31%	849	44.59%	61	3.20%	15	0.79%	1	0.05%	1	0.05%	128	6.72%	1,904
Lenawee	4,558	38.91%	6,471	55.24%	638	5.45%	35	0.30%	10	0.09%	3	0.03%	-1,913	-16.33%	11,715
Livingston	1,936	35.75%	3,238	59.80%	222	4.10%	12	0.22%	3	0.06%	4	0.07%	-1,302	-24.04%	5,415
Luce	334	66.67%	132	26.35%	32	6.39%	1	0.20%	0	0.00%	2	0.40%	202	40.32%	501
Mackinac	1,028	52.48%	903	46.09%	16	0.82%	8	0.41%	1	0.05%	3	0.15%	125	6.38%	1,959
Macomb	3,933	49.80%	3,709	46.97%	224	2.84%	28	0.35%	2	0.03%	1	0.01%	224	2.84%	7,897
Manistee	2,099	43.83%	2,458	51.33%	104	2.17%	114	2.38%	3	0.06%	11	0.23%	-359	-7.50%	4,789
Marquette	5,104	67.94%	1,832	24.39%	248	3.30%	303	4.03%	17	0.23%	8	0.11%	3,272	43.56%	7,512
Mason	2,237	56.89%	1,510	38.40%	136	3.46%	42	1.07%	3	0.08%	4	0.10%	727	18.49%	3,932
Mecosta	2,288	54.58%	1,702	40.60%	140	3.34%	55	1.31%	2	0.05%	5	0.12%	586	13.98%	4,192
Menominee	2,903	66.34%	1,275	29.14%	114	2.61%	65	1.49%	8	0.18%	11	0.25%	1,628	37.20%	4,376
Midland	1,712	56.78%	1,222	40.53%	44	1.46%	36	1.19%	0	0.00%	1	0.03%	490	16.25%	3,015
Missaukee	1,452	68.75%	587	27.79%	48	2.27%	18	0.85%	3	0.14%	4	0.19%	865	40.96%	2,112
Monroe	3,534	44.51%	4,141	52.16%	217	2.73%	44	0.55%	0	0.00%	3	0.04%	-607	-7.65%	7,939
Montcalm	3,666	55.42%	2,638	39.88%	183	2.77%	98	1.48%	0	0.00%	30	0.45%	1,028	15.54%	6,615
Montmorency	524	67.53%	240	30.93%	4	0.52%	7	0.90%	0	0.00%	1	0.13%	284	36.60%	776
Muskegon	3,284	44.14%	3,774	50.73%	137	1.84%	223	3.00%	11	0.15%	11	0.15%	-490	-6.59%	7,440
Newaygo	2,295	59.16%	1,391	35.86%	135	3.48%	49	1.26%	8	0.21%	1	0.03%	904	23.30%	3,879
Oakland	5,288	49.02%	5,033	46.66%	362	3.36%	84	0.78%	8	0.07%	12	0.11%	255	2.36%	10,787
Oceana	2,112	58.72%	1,197	33.28%	227	6.31%	50	1.39%	10	0.28%	1	0.03%	915	25.44%	3,597
Ogemaw	1,083	60.33%	608	33.87%	81	4.51%	21	1.17%	1	0.06%	1	0.06%	475	26.46%	1,795
Ontonagon	1,177	67.18%	495	28.25%	21	1.20%	47	2.68%	4	0.23%	8	0.46%	682	38.93%	1,752
Osceola	2,118	57.65%	1,409	38.35%	117	3.18%	5	0.14%	12	0.33%	11	0.30%	709	19.30%	3,674 (Note: Includes 2 Scattering votes)
Oscoda	316	69.30%	128	28.07%	9	1.97%	3	0.66%	0	0.00%	0	0.00%	188	41.23%	456
Otsego	725	60.52%	431	35.98%	29	2.42%	10	0.83%	1	0.08%	2	0.17%	294	24.54%	1,198
Ottawa	4,422	51.50%	3,694	43.02%	256	2.98%	195	2.27%	9	0.10%	10	0.12%	728	8.48%	8,586
Presque Isle	1,611	76.82%	412	19.65%	19	0.91%	53	2.53%	0	0.00%	2	0.10%	1,199	57.18%	2,097
Roscommon	381	60.96%	213	34.08%	14	2.24%	15	2.40%	0	0.00%	2	0.32%	168	26.88%	625
Saginaw	5,884	33.90%	10,573	60.91%	292	1.68%	521	3.00%	66	0.38%	22	0.13%	-4,689	-27.01%	17,358
Sanilac	3,685	60.45%	2,043	33.51%	323	5.30%	41	0.67%	1	0.02%	3	0.05%	1,642	26.94%	6,096
Schoolcraft	1,350	78.44%	317	18.42%	39	2.27%	11	0.64%	2	0.12%	2	0.12%	1,033	60.02%	1,721
Shiawassee	2,988	41.00%	3,700	50.78%	470	6.45%	117	1.61%	8	0.11%	4	0.05%	-712	-9.77%	7,287
St. Clair	6,065	51.42%	5,110	43.33%	336	2.85%	251	2.13%	22	0.19%	10	0.08%	955	8.10%	11,794
St. Joseph	2,929	44.89%	3,370	51.65%	143	2.19%	62	0.95%	0	0.00%	21	0.32%	-441	-6.76%	6,525
Tuscola	3,684	57.13%	2,338	36.26%	379	5.88%	42	0.65%	4	0.06%	1	0.02%	1,346	20.87%	6,448
Van Buren	3,623	50.12%	3,265	45.17%	189	2.61%	111	1.54%	9	0.12%	31	0.43%	358	4.95%	7,228
Washtenaw	3,168	29.58%	7,126	66.54%	328	3.06%	63	0.59%	15	0.14%	10	0.09%	-3,958	-36.96%	10,710
Wayne	40,456	50.70%	35,714	44.75%	1,540	1.93%	1,835	2.30%	219	0.27%	38	0.05%	4,742	5.94%	79,802
Wexford	2,495	61.68%	1,284	31.74%	226	5.59%	27	0.67%	7	0.17%	6	0.15%	1,211	29.94%	4,045
Total	262,141	48.39%	252,611	46.63%	16,092	2.97%	9,447	1.74%	845	0.16%	612	0.11%	9,530	1.76%	541,767

===== Counties that flipped from Republican to Democratic =====
- Barry
- Branch
- Calhoun
- Clinton
- Eaton
- Gratiot
- Hillsdale
- Ingham
- Ionia
- Isabella
- Jackson
- Kalamazoo
- Kent
- Lenawee
- Livingston
- Manistee
- Monroe
- Muskegon
- Saginaw
- Shiawassee
- St. Joseph
- Washtenaw
