= Michigan Department of Transportation =

Government agency in Michigan

- MDOT logo

Department overview
- Formed: July 1, 1905; 121 years ago
- Preceding department: Michigan Department of State Highways
- Jurisdiction: State of Michigan
- Headquarters: 425 West Ottawa Street Lansing, Michigan 48933; 42°44′04″N 84°33′30″W
- Annual budget: $4.7 billion (Note: For Fiscal Year 2019.)
- Department executive: Brad Wieferich, Director
- Key document: Constitution of Michigan Article V § 28
- Website: michigan.gov/mdot

The Michigan Department of Transportation (MDOT) is a constitutional government principal department of the US state of Michigan. The primary purpose of MDOT is to maintain the Michigan State Trunkline Highway System which includes all Interstate, US and state highways in Michigan with the exception of the Mackinac Bridge. (Note: The Mackinac Bridge Authority (MBA) is an independent state agency responsible for the Mackinac Bridge and thus maintains that section of the overall highway system. The MBA works with MDOT but does not report to it. The executive secretary of the MBA is appointed by MDOT with MBA approval.) Other responsibilities that fall under MDOT's mandate include airports, shipping and rail in Michigan.

The predecessor to today's MDOT was the Michigan State Highway Department (MSHD) that was formed on July 1, 1905 after a constitutional amendment was approved that year. The first activities of the department were to distribute rewards payments to local units of government for road construction and maintenance. In 1913, the state legislature authorized the creation of the state trunkline highway system, and the MSHD paid double rewards for those roads. These trunklines were signed in 1919, making Michigan the second state to post numbers on its highways. The department continued to improve roadways under its control through the Great Depression and into World War II. During the war, the state built its first freeways. These freeways became the start of Michigan's section of the Interstate Highway System. Since the mid-1960s, the department was reorganized. It was renamed the Michigan Department of State Highways for a time. Further changes culminated in adding all modes of transportation to the department's portfolio. In August 1973, the department was once again renamed to the Michigan Department of State Highways and Transportation by executive order. The name was later simplified and shortened to that of today.

== History ==
=== Early history ===
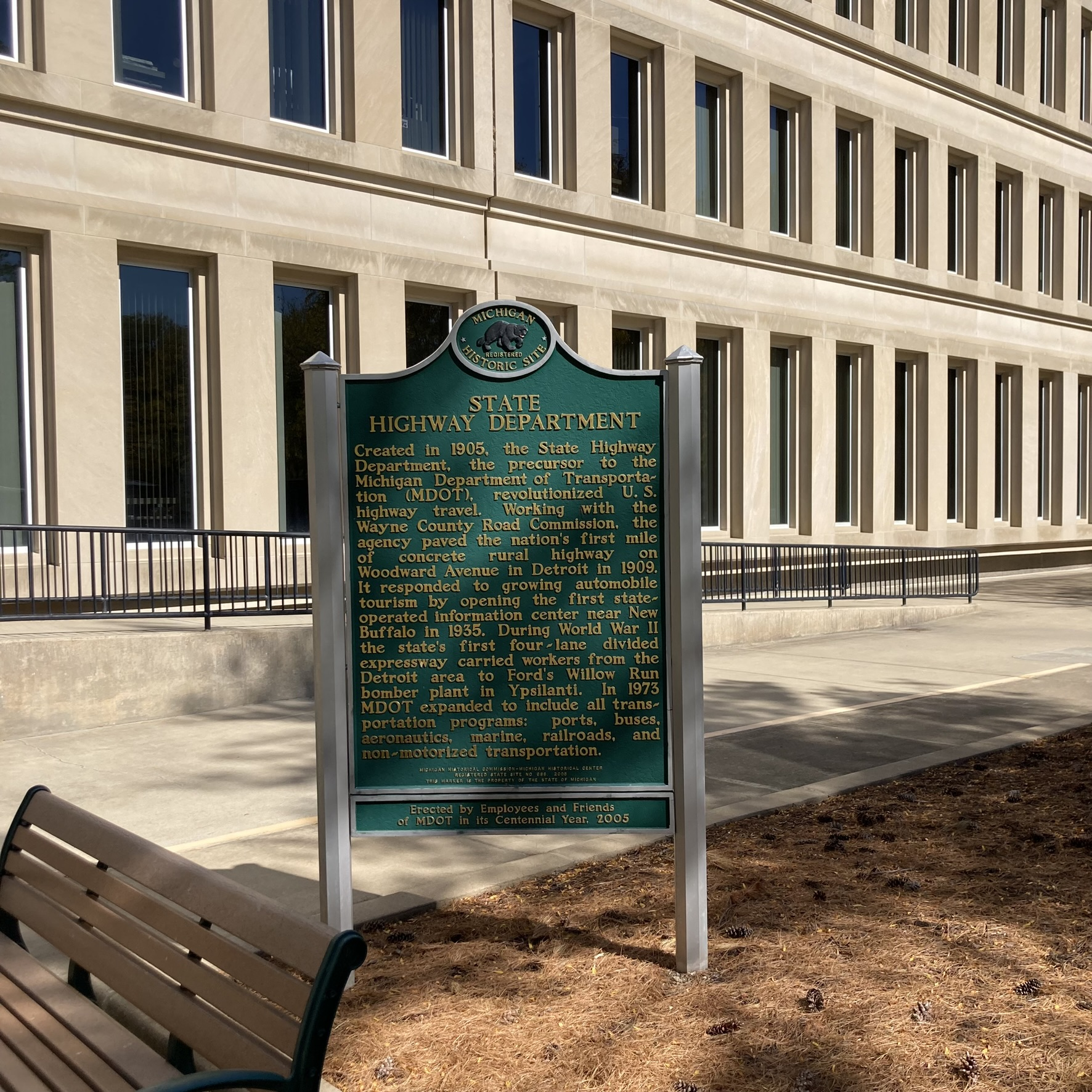
Michigan Historical Marker for the State Highway Department

The first State Highway Department was created on July 1, 1905. The department was born out of the Good Roads Movement at the turn of the century. Bicycle enthusiasts as a part of the League of American Wheelmen pushed for better roads and streets. They also wanted to ensure that bicyclists could use these streets and roads free from interference from horsedrawn vehicles. This movement persuaded the Michigan State Legislature to form a State Highway Commission in 1892. Another law in 1893 allowed voters in each county to establish county road commissions. The attention of Michigan residents was turned to the good-roads movement by Horatio S. Earle, the first state highway commission. In 1900 he organized the first International Road Congress in Port Huron and even put together a tour of a 1 mi (1.6 km) macadam road. He even ran for the state senate in 1900 at the urging of the Detroit Wheelmen bicycle club.

The legislature set up a state reward system for highways and created the State Highway Department with an office of Highway Commissioner. Earle was appointed by Governor Aaron Bliss. This appointment and department were voided when the attorney general ruled the law unconstitutional. A constitutional amendment was passed in 1905 to reverse this decision. The department was formed, and Earle was appointed commissioner by Governor Fred M. Warner on July 1, 1905.

At first the department administered rewards to the counties and townships for building roads to state minimum specifications. In 1905 there were 68,000 mi (110,000 km) of roads in Michigan. Of these roads, only 7,700 mi (12,000 km) were improved with gravel and 245 mi (394 km) were macadam. The state's "statute labor system" was abolished in 1907. Under that system, a farmer and a team of horses could work on road improvements in place of paying road taxes. Instead a property tax system was instituted with the funding only for permanent improvements, not maintenance. The nation's first mile of concrete roadway was laid along Woodward Avenue between Six Mile and Seven Mile roads in Detroit. This section of street was 17 feet 8 inches (5.38 m) wide. Work began by the Wayne County Road Commission on April 2, 1909 and finished on July 4, 1909, at a cost of $13,354 (equivalent to $332,472 in 2024).

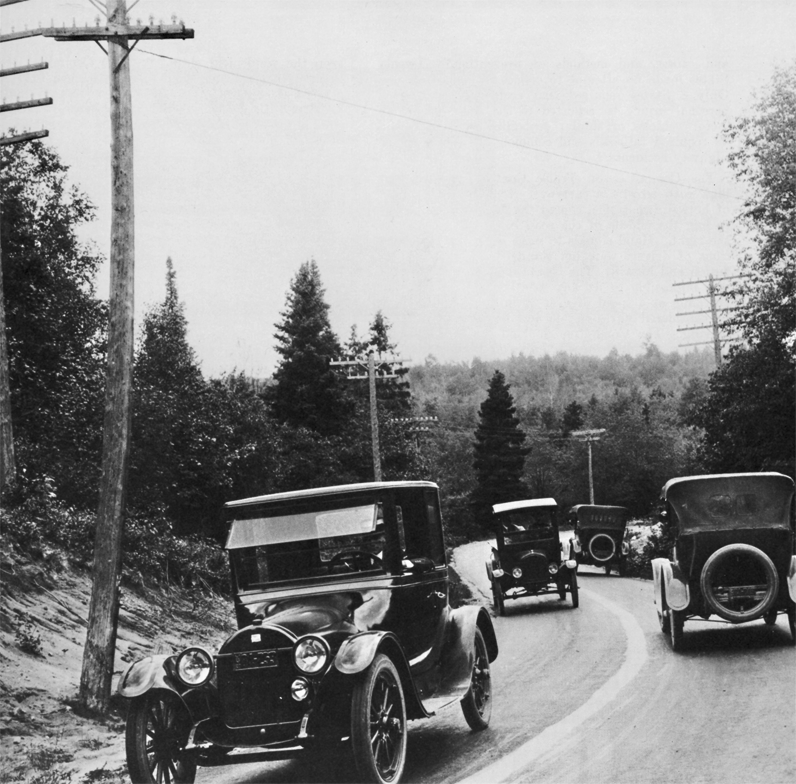
Dead Man's Curve along the Marquette–Negaunee Road shown in 1917 with its hand-painted centerline, the first in the nation

In 1913 voters elected Frank Rogers to the post of highway commissioner. This election was the first after the legislature made it an elective post. Automobile registrations surged to 20 times the level at the department's formation, to 60,438, and there were 1,754 mi (2,823 km) of roads built under the rewards system. Passage of the "State Trunkline Act" provided for 3,000 mi (4,828 km) of roadways with double rewards payments. Further legislation during the Rogers administration allowed for special assessment taxing districts for road improvements, taxation of automobiles based on weight and horsepower and tree-planting along highway roadsides. Another law allowed the commissioner to name all unnamed state roads. It also allowed for the posting of signage with the names and distances to towns.

The centerline was first invented in 1911 in Wayne County by Edward N. Hines, and saw its first implementation on a state highway in 1917 along the Marquette-Negaunee Road, then M-15 and now County Road 492 in Marquette County. That same year, the first stop sign was put in place and the country's first "crow's nest" traffic signal tower was installed in Detroit. This traffic light using red-yellow-green was developed by William Potts, a Detroit police officer. Michigan is also home to the first snowplow. This winter maintenance started during World War I to keep 590 mi (950 km) of strategic highways clear. In 1919 Michigan first signed the trunklines, the second state after Wisconsin to do so.

The first ferry service was started on July 1, 1923, linking Michigan's Upper and Lower peninsulas. The first gasoline tax was enacted in 1923 at the rate of $0.02/gal (equivalent to $0.37/gal in 2024), but vetoed by Governor Alex Groesbeck. It was later enacted effective in 1926. The highway commissioner was also given complete control over the planning and maintenance of the state trunklines. Construction switched to concrete or asphalt only instead of gravel and macadam with an increase in the gas tax in 1927. Highway construction in the 1920s earned Michigan national attention. The first trunklline completed in concrete was M-16 (later part of US 16). The road was built to a standard of 20 ft (6.1 m) and between 7–9 in (17.8–22.9 cm) thick. The current standard at the time was 16 ft (4.9 m) wide and 6 in (15.2 cm) thick. The 1920s were also busy for Michigan highways as Michigan developed the yellow-line center line to indicate no-passing zones for sight-restricted hills and curves. Roadside picnic tables, soil testing and aerial surveying of highways also debuted at this time. As MDOT historians put it, "the age of mud was over; the age of concrete was moving in.

=== Later history ===
During the Great Depression, highway construction slowed down with decreased gas tax and property tax revenues. License plate fees were sent to the counties for road funding starting in 1932 and road crews made of "reliefers". The federal aid money was split between the highway department and the welfare department. The county welfare agencies supplied workers on road construction projects across the state. Roadside parks and travel information centers debuted in the 1930s as well. During World War II the department built the Willow Run Expressway and the Detroit Industrial Expressway in 11 months so workers could get to the Ford Motor Company's bomber plant at Willow Run. When the Interstate Highway System was created in the late 1950s, Michigan modified existing freeway plans to fit the Interstate standards. In the 1960s nearly 1,000 mi (2,000 km) of freeways were built at an average pace of one new mile every three to four days. Michigan was also the first state to complete a border to border Interstate, I-94 from New Buffalo to Detroit running 205 mi (330 km). The 1950s and 60s also brought the completion of several major bridges in Michigan, the Mackinac Bridge in 1957, the Portage Lake Lift Bridge in 1959 and the International Bridge in 1962. The biggest bridge designed by the department spanned the River Rouge carrying the Fisher Freeway (I-75). This bridge was 8,367 ft (2,550 m) long and 115 ft (35 m) high.

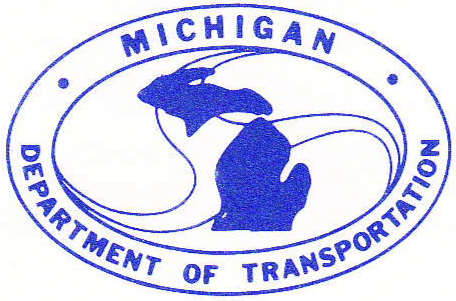
MDOT logo 1978

The adoption of the 1963 Constitution reorganized the department. No longer would the highway commissioner be elected. Instead, a six-member commission appointed by the governor and headed day to day by a department director initial appointed by the commission. The new commission would also have jurisdiction over "such other public works of the state as provided by law. At the time, the name was rearranged to the Michigan Department of State Highways. The legislative authorization led to 1970s reorganization of the department. An executive order by Governor William G. Milliken gave the department authority over all transportation programs in Michigan. The department was renamed on August 23, 1973, to the Michigan Department of State Highways and Transportation giving it responsibility for aviation, railroads, buses, ships, ports and non-motorized pathways and trails. In 1976, the department acquired the Ann Arbor Railroad. The acquisition included right-of-way from Ashley to Cadillac and from Ann Arbor to Toledo, Ohio. At the time, the department gained the rolling stock of the railroad in the first such purchase by the department. The name of the department was later shortened to the current form in 1978.

In November 1978, Michigan voters approved Proposal M, which, in addition to allocating gas tax revenues, replaced the Michigan State Highway Commission with the Michigan State Transportation Commission. By 1983, the department director became appointed by the state governor.

== Leadership ==
=== State Highway Commissioners ===
- Horatio S. Earle, 1905–1909
- Townsend A. Ely, 1909–1913
- Frank F. Rogers, 1913–1929
- Grover C. Dillman, 1929–1933
- Murray Van Wagoner, 1933–1940
- Donald Kennedy, 1940–1942
- Lloyd B. Reid, 1942–1943
- Charles M. Ziegler, 1943–1957
- John C. Mackie, 1957–1965

=== Department Directors ===
- Howard E. Hill, 1965–1967
- Henrik E. Stafseth, 1967–1972
- John P. Woodford, 1972–1982
- James P. Pitz, 1982–1991
- Patrick M. Nowak, 1991–1996
- Robert Welke, 1996–1997
- James R. DeSana, 1997–2001
- Gregory J. Rosine, 2001–2002
- Gloria J. Jeff, 2003–2006
- Kirk T. Steudle, 2006–2018
- Mark Van Port Fleet, 2018
- Paul C. Ajegba, 2019–2022
- Brad Wieferich, 2023–present

=== Transportation Commission ===
The Michigan State Transportation Commission establishes policy for the Michigan Department of Transportation as they relate to transportation programs, facilities, and developments. The Michigan State Transportation Commission is composed of six members, serving three-year terms, appointed by the Governor of Michigan with the advice and consent of the Michigan Senate.

==== Membership ====
The Constitution of Michigan requires that no more than three members be from the same political party.

Name	Hometown	Start	End
Heath E. Salisbury^{†}	Gaines	April 8, 2022	December 21, 2027
Rita Brown	Birmingham	April 2023	December 21, 2028
Glenn Bukoski	Metamora	February 2, 2026	December 21, 2026
John Peracchio	Grosse Pointe Shores	February 2, 2026	December 21, 2028
Suzanne Schulz	Grand Rapids	August 7, 2020	December 21, 2027.
Richard W. Turner	Monroe	March 5, 2021	December 21, 2026
^{†} Chair, ^{‡} Vice-Chair

=== Michigan Aeronautics Commission ===
The Michigan Aeronautics Commission is charged with creating rules regarding airports, related facilities and pilot training. It is composed of five gubernatorial appointees and 4 department head representatives.

Name	Hometown	Start	End
Benjamin R. Carter^{†}	Farmington Hills	May 26, 2021	May 27, 2028
Rick J. Fiddler^{‡}	Ada	May 28, 2021	May 27, 2029
Kelly Burris	Pleasant Ridge	July 14, 2019	May 27, 2027
Russell Kavalhuna	Dearborn	May 26, 2021	May 27, 2029
Dr. Brian R. Smith	Grand Ledge	2019	May 27, 2027
Captain Greg Setla	Representative for the Michigan State Police		
Brig. Gen. Daniel J. Kramer II	Representative for the Michigan Department of Military and Veterans Affairs		
Kevin Jacobs	Representative for the Michigan Department of Natural Resources		
Paul J. McDonald	Representative of the MDOT Director		
Bryan Budds	Ex-officio director of the Michigan Aeronautics Commission as the Director of the Bureau of Aeronautics and Freight Services of MDOT		
^{†} Chair, ^{‡} Vice-Chair; Information from the Bureau of Aeronautics

== Department organization ==
MDOT Regions Bay Grand Metro North Southwest Superior University

MDOT is organized into seven regions statewide and a series of divisions and bureaus that report through two chief officers to the department director. The chief administrative officer oversees the sections of the department related to aviation and aeronautics, finances, transportation planning and human resources. The chief operations officers supervises the seven regional offices, and the divisions devoted to highway research, design and construction.

The offices devoted to communications, passenger transportation and business and economic affairs report to director of the department. The Mackinac Bridge Authority coordinates its activities to maintain the Mackinac Bridge as an independent agency through the department director. The International Bridge Administration (IBA) is the arm of the department responsible to the Sault Ste. Marie Bridge Authority. That authority maintains the International Bridge. The IBA reports to the chief administrative officer.

=== Bureau of Aeronautics and Freight Services ===
The Bureau of Aeronautics and Freight Services carries out the enforcement of the Commission's rules. It has three divisions: Airports Division, Aviation Services, and Freight Services. The bureau, along with the Passenger Transportation Bureau, was formed out of the Multi-Modal Transportation Services Bureau in 2006. The Airports Division runs development programs for airports which includes planning, design safety evaluation and construction. Additionally, this division licenses airports, flight schools, aircraft, and aircraft dealers and inspects airports. Seminars for pilots are run to keep license pilots up to date on current procedures. Mike Trout oversees the Aeronautics. The Aviation Services Division assists airports in bring in and retaining airline services. Through the Airport Preservation Program, this division aids at risk airports to find ways to stay open.

=== Railroad subsidies ===
The department provides subsidies to Amtrak Michigan Services operations in the state for the Blue Water, Wolverine and the Pere Marquette lines.

== See also ==
- Michigan left
