= Dinosaur Swamps =

Studio album by the Flock
- Released: September 1970
- Genre: Jazz rock
- Length: 40:53
- Label: Columbia
- Producer: John McClure

The Flock chronology
The Flock (1969)	Dinosaur Swamps (1970)	Inside Out (1975)

Professional ratings
Review scores
Source	Rating
Allmusic	2/5 stars

Dinosaur Swamps is the second album by the Flock. It was released in 1970.

The cover art, featuring pterosaurs (not classified as dinosaurs), is modified from a mural painted by Constantin Astori. The titles of the first two tracks ("Green Slice" and "Big Bird") refer to items found on the album cover, while the titles for all the remaining tracks can be found on the hand-drawn map inside the gatefold sleeve.

== Chart performance ==
The album debuted on Billboard magazine's Top LP's chart in the issue dated October 17, 1970, peaking at No. 96 during a nine-week run on the chart.

== Track listing ==
All tracks composed by The Flock

1. "Green Slice" – 2:02
2. "Big Bird" – 5:50
3. "Hornschmeyer's Island" – 7:25
4. "Lighthouse" – 5:19
5. "Crabfoot" – 8:14
6. "Mermaid" - 4:53
7. "Uranian Sircus" - 7:11

== Personnel ==
=== The Flock ===
- Jerry Goodman – violin, guitars, vocals
- Fred Glickstein – guitars, lead vocals, Hammond organ
- Jerry Smith – bass guitar, vocals
- Ron Karpman – drums
- Rick Canoff – tenor saxophone, vocals
- Tom Webb – tenor saxophone, vocals
- Frank Posa – trumpet
- John Gerber – alto and tenor saxophones, flute, banjo, vocals

=== Technical ===
- John McClure – producer
- Don Meehan, Don Puluse – engineers
- American Museum of Natural History – cover art
- Columbia Records Photo Studio – photography

== Charts ==
Chart peaks for Dinosaur Swamps
Chart (1970)	Peak position
US Billboard Top LP's	96
