= Astori =

Astori is an Italian surname. Notable people with the surname include:

- Constantin Astori (1889–1975), Russian artist
- Danilo Astori (born 1940), Uruguayan politician
- Davide Astori (1987–2018), Italian footballer
- Gianfranco Astori (born 1948), Italian journalist and politician
- Vicky Astori (1912–1968), Italian actress
