= The Flock (album) =

Studio album by The Flock
- Released: 1969
- Recorded: 1969
- Genres: Progressive rock, Jazz fusion
- Length: 45:17
- Label: Sony Music Entertainment
- Producer: John McClure

The Flock chronology
The Flock (1969)	Dinosaur Swamps (1970)

Professional ratings
Review scores
Source	Rating
AllMusic	4/5 stars
Rolling Stone	neutral

The Flock is the debut album by the Flock, released in 1969. The album's jazz fusion sound was influenced by Miles Davis' Bitches Brew, in which Flock member Tom Webb participated, but whose performance was not recorded.

Grammy Award winning producer of jazz and classical albums for Columbia Records John McClure produced the album. The cover photo was taken by Columbia staff photographer Don Hunstein, famous for the cover of The Freewheelin' Bob Dylan. The album was engineered by Arthur Kendy & Don Puluse.

Side one closes with a cover of the 1965 The Kinks classic, "Tired of Waiting for You". Side two closes with a 15:25 jam called "Truth". Liner notes were written from the audience at Whisky a Go Go by John Mayall on July 9, 1969.

== Chart performance ==
The Flock reached the US album charts soon after its release. The album debuted on Billboard magazine's Top LP's chart in the issue dated September 20, 1969, peaking at No. 48 during a twenty-week run on the chart. It entered Cashbox magazine's Top 100 Albums chart in the issue dated September 12, 1969, peaking at No. 62 during a thirteen-week run on the chart.

== Track listing ==
=== Side one ===
==== "Introduction" (4:50) ====
- Fred Glickstein - guitar
- Jerry Goodman - violin

=== "Clown" (7:42) ===
- Fred Glickstein - guitar, lead vocals
- Jerry Goodman - violin, backing vocals, guitar
- Tom Webb - tenor saxophone
- Rick Canoff - tenor saxophone, backing vocals
- Frank Posa - trumpet
- Jerry Smith - bass, backing vocals
- Ron Karpman - drums

==== "I Am the Tall Tree" (5:37) ====
- Fred Glickstein - 12-string acoustic guitar, lead vocals
- Jerry Goodman - violin, backing vocals
- Tom Webb - tenor saxophone
- Rick Canoff - tenor saxophone, backing vocals
- Frank Posa - trumpet
- Jerry Smith - bass, backing vocals
- Ron Karpman - drums

==== "Tired of Waiting" (4:35) ====
- Written by Ray Davies
- Fred Glickstein - guitar, lead vocals
- Jerry Goodman - violin, backing vocals
- Tom Webb - maracas
- Rick Canoff - tenor saxophone
- Frank Posa - trumpet
- Jerry Smith - bass, backing vocals
- Ron Karpman - drums

=== Side two ===
==== "Store Bought - Store Thought" (7:00) ====
- Fred Glickstein - 6-string electric and 12-string acoustic guitars, lead vocals
- Jerry Goodman - guitar, backing vocals
- Tom Webb - tenor saxophone, backing vocals, flute
- Rick Canoff - tenor saxophone, backing vocals
- Frank Posa - trumpet
- Jerry Smith - bass, backing vocals
- Ron Karpman - drums

==== "Truth" (15:25) ====
- Fred Glickstein - guitar, lead vocals
- Jerry Goodman - violin
- Tom Webb - harmonica, tenor saxophone
- Rick Canoff - tenor saxophone
- Frank Posa - trumpet
- Jerry Smith - bass
- Ron Karpman - drums

== Charts ==
Chart peaks for The Flock
Chart (1969–1970)	Peak position
US Billboard Top LP's	48
US Cashbox Top 100 Albums	62
