= Belmont, Vermont =

- Unincorporated community
- Location within Vermont Location within the United States
- Coordinates: 43°24′56″N 72°49′20″W
- Country: United States
- State: Vermont
- County: Rutland
- Elevation: 1,824 ft (556 m)

Population (2016)
  - Total: 245
  - Density: 18/sq mi (6.9/km^{2})
- Time zone: UTC-5 (Eastern (EST))
  - Summer (DST): UTC-4 (EDT)
- ZIP code: 05730
- Area code: 802
- GNIS feature ID: 1460597

Belmont is an unincorporated community in the town of Mount Holly in Rutland County, Vermont, United States. Belmont is about six miles west of the village of Ludlow. It features a small general store and the main brewery for the Mount Holly Beer Co. The Belmont green, in the center of a cluster of historic architecture, mostly ski homes, features a Baptist church, a community library, and a historical society museum with a real mammoth tusk originating from when a woolly mammoth skeleton was found beneath the train tracks in Mount Holly.

== Notable people ==
- Hannah Teter (born 1987), snowboarder
- John McClure (1929–2014), record producer and engineer
