= Flock Rock – The Best of The Flock =

Compilation album by The Flock
- Released: 2008
- Genre: jazz fusion
- Length: 66:34
- Label: BGO

The Flock chronology
Live in Europe (2004)	Flock Rock – The Best of The Flock (2008)

Flock Rock: Best of the Flock is a compilation album by The Flock. It includes songs from their first and second albums, the only ones released on Columbia Records, as well as five previously unreleased songs.

== Track listing ==
All tracks composed by The Flock

1. "Introduction" - 4:53
2. "Clown" - 7:44
3. "I Am the Tall Tree" - 5:30
4. "Tired of Waiting for You" - 4:38
5. "What Would You Do If the Sun Died?" - 2:48
6. "Lollipops and Rainbows" (previously unreleased) - 4:05
7. "Green Slice" - 2:04
8. "Big Bird" - 5:50
9. "Hornschmeyer's Island" - 7:25
10. "Crabfoot" - 8:16
11. "Mermaid" - 4:53
12. "Chanja" (previously unreleased) - 2:38
13. "Atlantians Truckin' Home" (previously unreleased) - 4:50
14. "Afrika" (previously unreleased) - 4:34
15. "Just Do It" (previously unreleased) - 6:35

== Personnel ==
- Jerry Goodman - violin, guitars, vocals
- Fred Glickstein - guitars, lead vocals, keyboards
- Jerry Smith - bass guitar, vocals
- Ron Karpman - drums, vocals
- Tom Webb - vocals, sax, flute
- Rick Canoff - sax, vocals
- Jon Gerber - sax, flute, keyboards, vocals
- Rick Mann - guitar, vocals
- Frank Posa - trumpet, posaphone
