= James B. Bradley =

American politician (1858–1940)

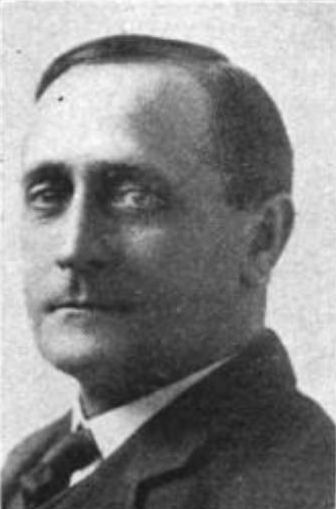

Michigan Auditor General
- In office 1905–1908
- Governor: Fred M. Warner
- Preceded by: Perry F. Powers
- Succeeded by: Oramel B. Fuller

Personal details
- Born: November 19, 1858 Middlebury Township, Michigan
- Died: July 4, 1940 (aged 81) Eaton Rapids, Michigan
- Party: Republican
- Education: Rush Medical College

James Bray Bradley (November 19, 1858 – July 4, 1940) was the Michigan Auditor General from 1905 to 1908.

== Early life ==
Bradley was born on November 19, 1858, in Middlebury Township, Michigan. Bradley graduated from Rush Medical College in the spring of 1886.

== Career ==
Bradley worked as a physician and surgeon in Grand Rapids, Michigan. Bradley was elected to the position of Michigan Auditor General in 1904, and served from 1905 to 1908. Bradley was a candidate in the Republican primary for the 1908 Michigan gubernatorial election. Bradley was a presidential elector from Michigan in 1928.

== Personal life ==
Bradley was a member of the American Medical Association, the Knights Templar, the Shriners, the Knights of Pythias, and the Maccabees. Bradley was Freemason. Bradley was Methodist.

== Death ==
Bradley died in Eaton Rapids, Michigan, on July 4, 1940.
