= U.S. Highway association =

Promotional associations for business and tourism

U.S. Highway associations were organizations to promote business and tourism along specific highways. The earliest ones also worked on interconnecting various state highways to create longer, multi-state highways. Since 1990, new associations have formed (primarily for U.S. Route 66) for preservation of historic highways.

== The National Auto Trails associations ==
The National Auto Trail began in the 1910s as part of the Good Roads Movement. With the growth of the automobile, state highways were beginning to be developed. The idea began to develop for a need for longer, interstate roads and associations developed to work with the various state transportation departments to interlink the roads. In 1911, the National Old Trails Association was created to establish the National Old Trails Highway, a road linking New York City with Los Angeles.

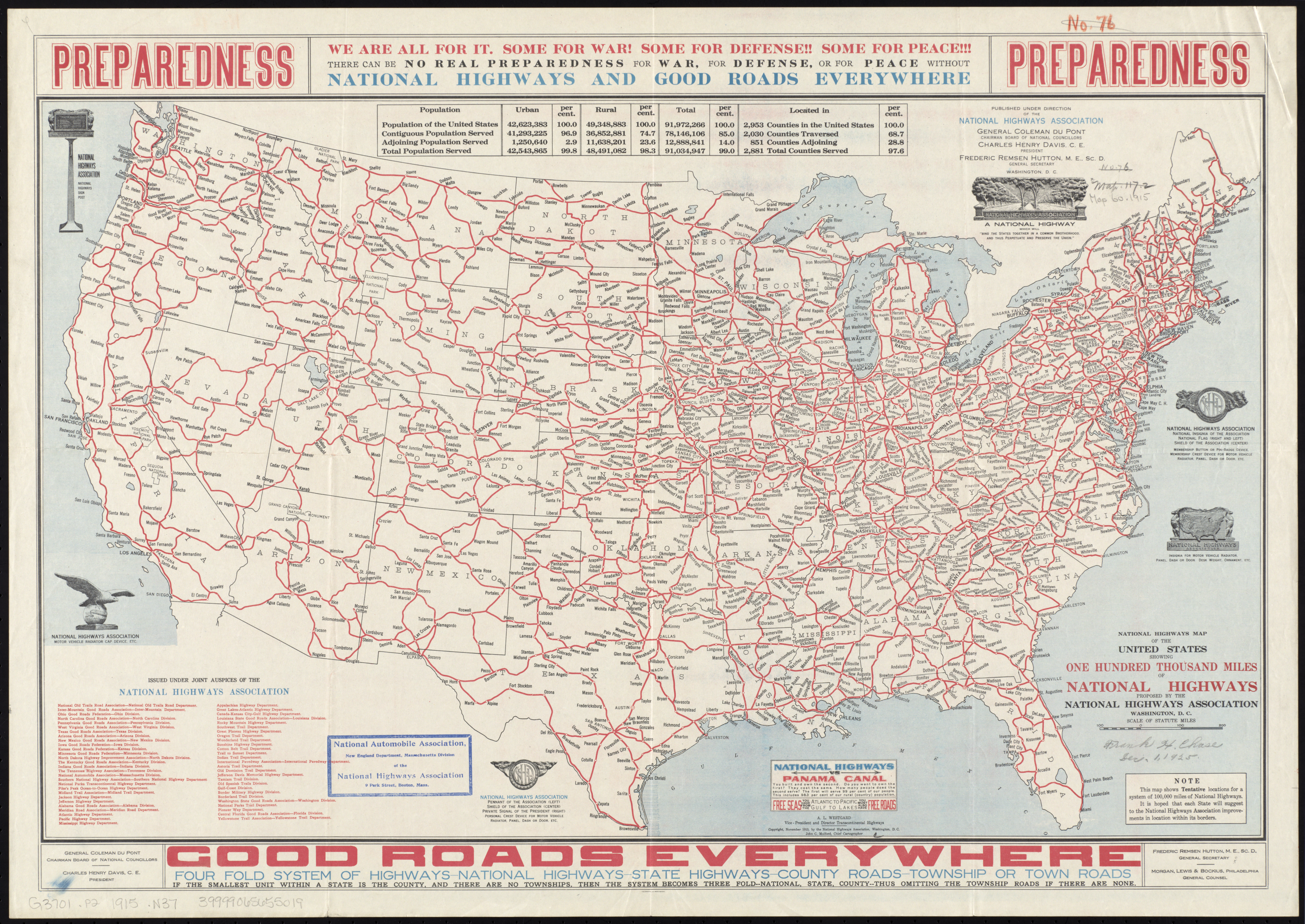
1915 map showing 100,000 miles of proposed national highways

That same year, the National Highways Association was started, with the slogan "Good roads for everyone!" The organization, which was co-founded by Charles Henry Davis, promoted the creation and maintenance of 50,000 miles of highway. This includes the Jefferson Davis Highway. The organization distributed pamphlets promoting the importance of highway systems and created maps in their own office, located in South Yarmouth, Massachusetts.

In 1912, the Lincoln Highway Association was created to establish the Lincoln Highway, a road between New York City and San Francisco championed by bicycle and auto parts and racing tycoon Carl Graham Fisher. Three years later, in 1915, the Old Spanish Trail Association was founded in Mobile, Alabama, to develop the southernmost national highway from St. Augustine, Florida, to San Diego, California. Subscriptions from individual cities and towns on the proposed route, along with individual memberships and donations from corporations, provided funds for the groups. Actual maintenance and construction of the roads remained the responsibility of the individual states.

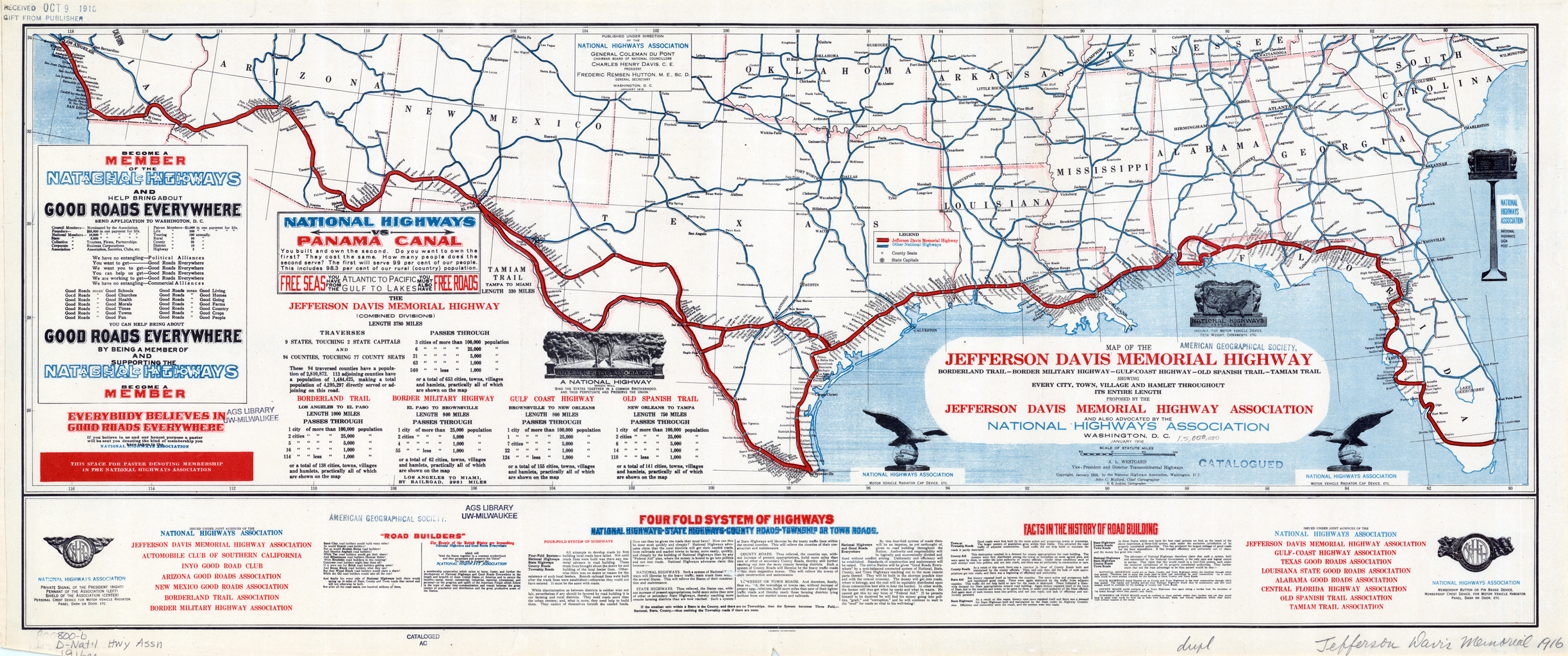
Map of the Jefferson Davis Memorial Highway, created by the National Highways Association in 1916

However, problems were not unheard of. In some cases, states would not cooperate with the organizations. The Lincoln Highway Association wanted a branch to come off the main road at Ely, Nevada to carry travelers to Los Angeles. The state of Utah, though, wanted it to branch off at Salt Lake City, Utah to keep travelers in their state longer. They therefore refused to upgrade a section of the Lincoln Highway west of Salt Lake City.

Other problems included con-artists collecting money from towns and then disappearing, never providing support for the road as agreed. Also, signs at times became sporadic or difficult to read and multiple trails on the same road (also known as overlapping) tended to cause confusion to motorists. These problems would result in the creation of the U.S. Highway System in 1926.

== US Highway associations ==
The creation of the US Highway System brought the end of the old trail associations, though the original Lincoln Highway Association would not disband officially until 1935. But new associations, to promote commerce and tourism along their specific highways, started. The U.S. Highway 66 Association formed in 1927 and became the most prominent of the groups. It would continue until 1975 as US 66 was becoming bypassed by interstates. Other groups promoted U.S. Route 40, U.S. Route 60, and U.S. Route 93. These groups mainly published travel guides for tourist, though the US 66 group was sometimes more political.

== Historic associations ==
The first historic highway associations were the Arizona and Missouri Route 66 associations. Missouri's group was the first to get historic markers erected along the highway, in 1991. Currently all eight states on Route 66 have their own state organizations. There is also a National Route 66 Federation. In 1992, the Lincoln Highway Association was revitalized to preserve and promote the old Lincoln Highway. Other historic highway organizations now include: The Yellowstone Trail Association, the US Route 6 Tourist Association, the National Road Association, and the Midland Trail Association. A new American Road Foundation was formed in 2007 to promote preservation of all US highways and auto trails.
