= Inside Out (The Flock album) =

Studio album by The Flock
- Released: 1975
- Recorded: 1975
- Studio: Paragon Studios
- Genre: Jazz rock
- Length: 34:46
- Label: Mercury
- Producer: Felix Pappalardi

The Flock chronology
| Dinosaur Swamps (1970) | Inside Out (1975) | Live in Europe (2004) |

Inside Out is the third album by The Flock. It was released in 1975 after a four year hiatus. Michael Zydowsky replaced Jerry Goodman on violin, who had gone on to join The Mahavishnu Orchestra.

== Track listing ==
Side 1

1. "Music for Our Friends" - 4:26 (James Hirsen)
2. "Back to You" - 8:06 (Hirsen)
3. "Metamorphosis" - 5:37 (Hirsen, Fred Glickstein, Jerry Smith, Mike Zydowsky, Ron Karpman)

Side 2

4. "Hang On" - 3:15 (Glickstein, Smith, Karpman)
5. "My OK Today" - 7:23 (Glickstein, Smith, Karpman)
6. "Straight Home" - 6:00 (Hirsen, Karpman)

== Personnel ==
=== Musicians ===
- Fred Glickstein - guitar, lead vocals
- James L. Hirsen - keyboards, backing and lead vocals
- Mike Zydowsky - violin
- Jerry Smith - bass, backing vocals
- Ron Karpman - drums, backing vocals
- Felix Pappalardi - backing vocals (6)

=== Technical ===
- Felix Pappalardi – producer
- Barry Mraz – engineer
- Rob Kingsley – assistant engineer
- Gilbert Kong – mastering
- Jim Schubert – art direction & design
- Laura Schaefer – cover art
- Marc Hauser – photography
