= The Flock (band) =

Jazz rock band

- Promotional photo (L to R) Rick Canoff, Fred Glickstein, Tom Webb, Jerry Smith (bottom), Ron Karpman (top), Frank Posa and Jerry Goodman

Background information
- Origin: Chicago, Illinois, United States
- Genres: Jazz rock
- Labels: Columbia, Sony, Gab, One Way, BGO
- Past members: Jerry Goodman; Fred Glickstein; Jerry Smith; Ron Karpman; Rick Canoff; Tom Webb; Frank Posa; John Gerber; Rick Mann; Michael Zydowsky

The Flock was an American, Chicago-based jazz rock band, that released two albums on Columbia Records in 1969 (The Flock) and 1970 (Dinosaur Swamps). The Flock did not achieve the commercial success of other Columbia jazz-rock groups of the era such as Chicago and Blood Sweat & Tears, but were recognized for featuring a violin prominently in their music. The violinist, Jerry Goodman, went on to become a member of Mahavishnu Orchestra and a solo artist. They also received some exposure with their release of a cover of The Kinks' "Tired Of Waiting For You" as a single in April 1970 (CBS 4932).

== History ==
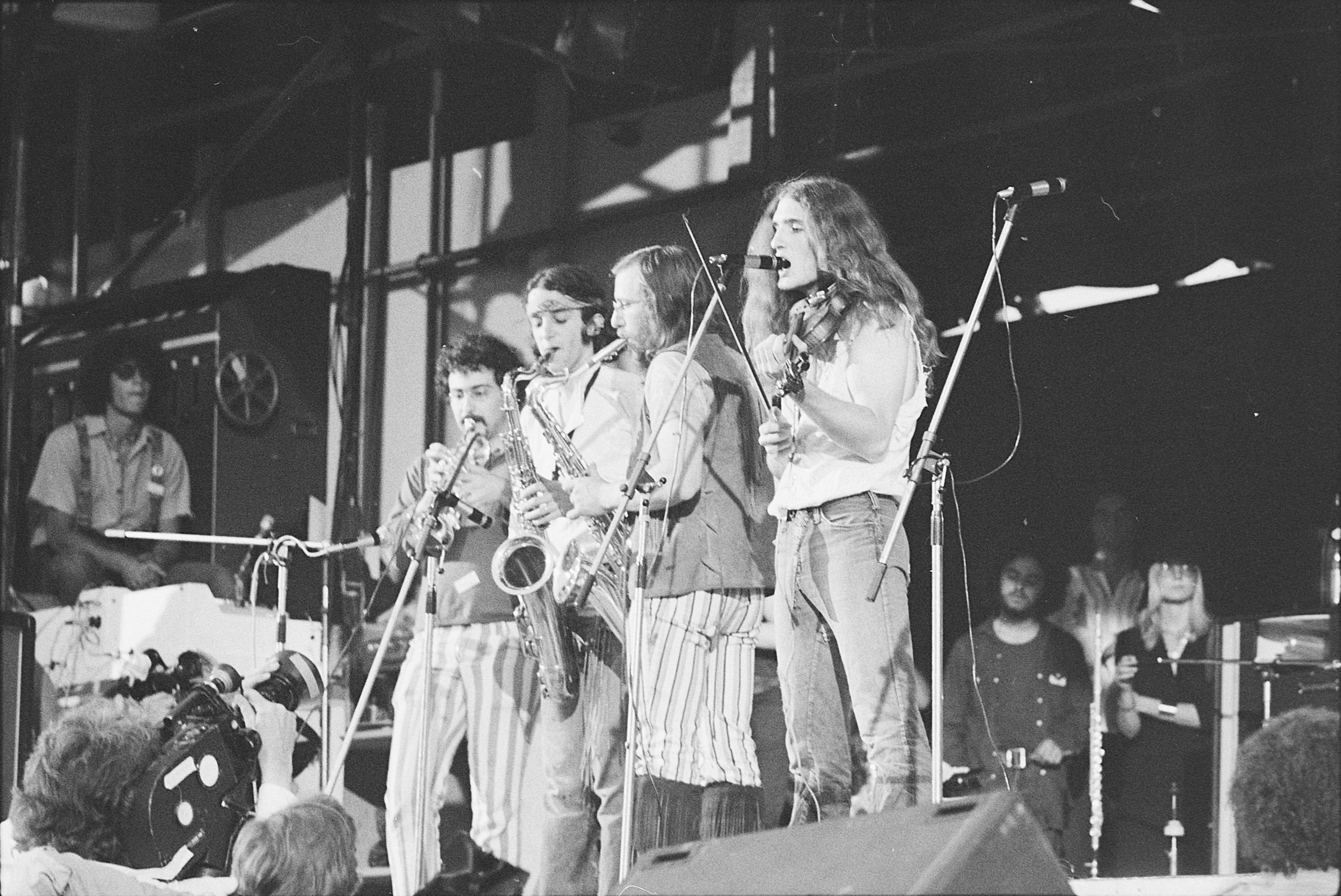
The Flock (Kralingen 1970)

The Flock had three early singles on Destination Records and one on USA Records, local Chicago labels, recorded between 1966 and 1968. Goodman was not in this line-up but worked as a roadie with the band. All four singles, "Can't You See (That I Really Love Her)", "Are You The Kind", "Take Me Back" and "What Would You Do If The Sun Died?" are available on CD. The members at the time of their 1969 album recording were Fred Glickstein (guitar, lead vocals), Jerry Goodman (violin), Jerry Smith (bass), Ron Karpman (drums), Rick Canoff (saxophone), Tom (T.S. Henry) Webb (saxophone) and Frank Posa (trumpet).

The promising first album was further into jazz fusion than either Chicago or Blood Sweat & Tears, influenced by Miles Davis' Bitches Brew album, in which Webb participated, but whose performance was not recorded. The first album was produced by Grammy Award winning producer of jazz and classical albums for Columbia Records John McClure. with liner notes written from the audience at Whisky a Go Go by John Mayall, on July 9, 1969. The band went back into the studio and recorded a second album entitled Dinosaur Swamps, (with Jon Gerber replacing Tom Webb) featuring the hit, "Big Bird." They began work on a third studio album, provisionally titled Flock Rock, but rumours at the time had Columbia Records' Clive Davis raiding The Flock and recruiting Goodman for the Mahavishnu Orchestra project. Glickstein's remembrance of the event was, according to the sleevenotes with The Flock compilation CD Truth, slightly more matter-of-fact: "In reality the band members started going in different musical directions. You know. That old song."

The Flock reunited briefly in 1975 for an album, Inside Out, and in 2004 a CD of a 1973 concert called Live in Europe was released, which features Michael Zydowsky on violin in place of Goodman and includes original members Fred Glickstein, Jerry Smith, and Ron Karpman.

In late 1976, Fred Glickstein and Ron Karpman recruited bassist/cellist Thom Blecka and formed a power trio called FLOCK 3. The new outfit played some older Flock compositions but emphasized new material co-written by Glickstein and Karpman, with some arrangements contributed by Blecka. The rock-oriented fusion trio played a few local gigs opening for Cheap Trick and The Cryan' Shames. They were occasionally joined onstage by Flock alumnus T.S. Henry Webb (saxophone and vocals) and also friends Dennis Tiger (blues harp and vocals) and Jeff Gates (keyboards). The band's live performances were never captured on tape and studio recording attempts fell by the wayside, due to personnel conflicts.

There is film footage of the big-band version of the Flock (the Dinosaur Swamps version of the group) playing the song "Big Bird (Fly)" on the 1971 Dutch documentary Stamping Ground. Goodman is prominently featured in the video among members of the group.

Jerry Smith and Jerry Goodman organized the Return of the Flock for a June 2024 reunion performance, at the Ravinia Festival in Chicago's north suburbs, with hopes for more gigs. They recruited several new musicians to join the Return of the Flock, including Howard Levy (harmonica and keyboards) and Mike Flynn (lead vocals and lead guitar).

== Discography ==
- The Flock (1969) No. 48 US
- Dinosaur Swamps (1970) No. 96 US
- Inside Out (1975)
- Live in Europe (2004)
- Flock Rock – The Best of The Flock (2008)
- 2131 South Michigan Ave (2009)
- Heaven Bound: The Lost Album (recorded 1977) (2014)
