= Constantin Astori =

Russian-American painter

Constantine Astori (Russian: Константин Николаевич Астафьев; April 11, (March 29 O.S.) 1889 — June 11, 1975) was a renowned artist of mostly landscapes in pastels, watercolors and charcoal.

== Early life ==
He was born on March 29, 1889, as Constantin Nicholas Astafieff in Voronezh, Russia. He had his art education in Russia. He married Olga Trofimoff, on May 17, 1916, in Crimea, Russia.

When the Soviet revolution happened in 1917 the region had a lot of conflicts and did not support the revolution. This was not a good time for the newly married couple so they decided to escape to Constantinople (presently Istanbul). Once they moved to Turkey they changed their name to Astori to start a new life with a new name. Constantin Astori spent his years in Istanbul painting street scenes. He was particularly interested in mosques with minarets and old Istanbul streets with people. He experimented pastels and charcoal. The art world in Istanbul was limited and not intriguing. The couple first thought about moving to Paris then decided to move to New York. On October 1, 1923, he immigrated to the United States of America, while his wife Olga moved to Paris. She joined her husband three years later, in 1926. Astori settled in New York City and tried to get into the art world. He worked as an art restorer for various museums. He became naturalized US citizen in 1936.

== Career ==
From the 1930s to the 1940s he restored art works for the Smithsonian Institution and Cooper-Hewitt Design Museum. In 1940 he was commissioned to paint a mural for American Natural Museum in New York. He completed the mural, which depicted pterosaurs, the same year. This mural is still over the stairs in the museum. Later in 1970 this mural was used in the album cover of Dinosaur Swamps by the band called the Flock (band). He participated to various art shows but never realized his dream of becoming a famous artist. He experimented with black and white drawings of New York street scenes. Later in his life he was more interested in pastels depicting serene country scenes.

His wife Olga died on January 23, 1975, he died the same year on June 11, 1975. The couple had no children. His artwork can be found in art dealers internationally. He is interred at the Woodlawn Cemetery in Lakewood, Ocean County, New Jersey, USA
