= Hortonville, Vermont =

- Unincorporated community
- Location within Vermont Location within the United States
- Coordinates: 43°28′11″N 72°48′17″W
- Country: United States
- State: Vermont
- County: Rutland
- Elevation: 1,542 ft (470 m)
- Time zone: UTC-5 (Eastern (EST))
  - Summer (DST): UTC-4 (EDT)
- ZIP Code: 05758
- Area code: 802
- GNIS feature ID: 1461006

Hortonville is an unincorporated community in Rutland County, Vermont, United States.
