= Good Roads Movement =

Political movement in the United States

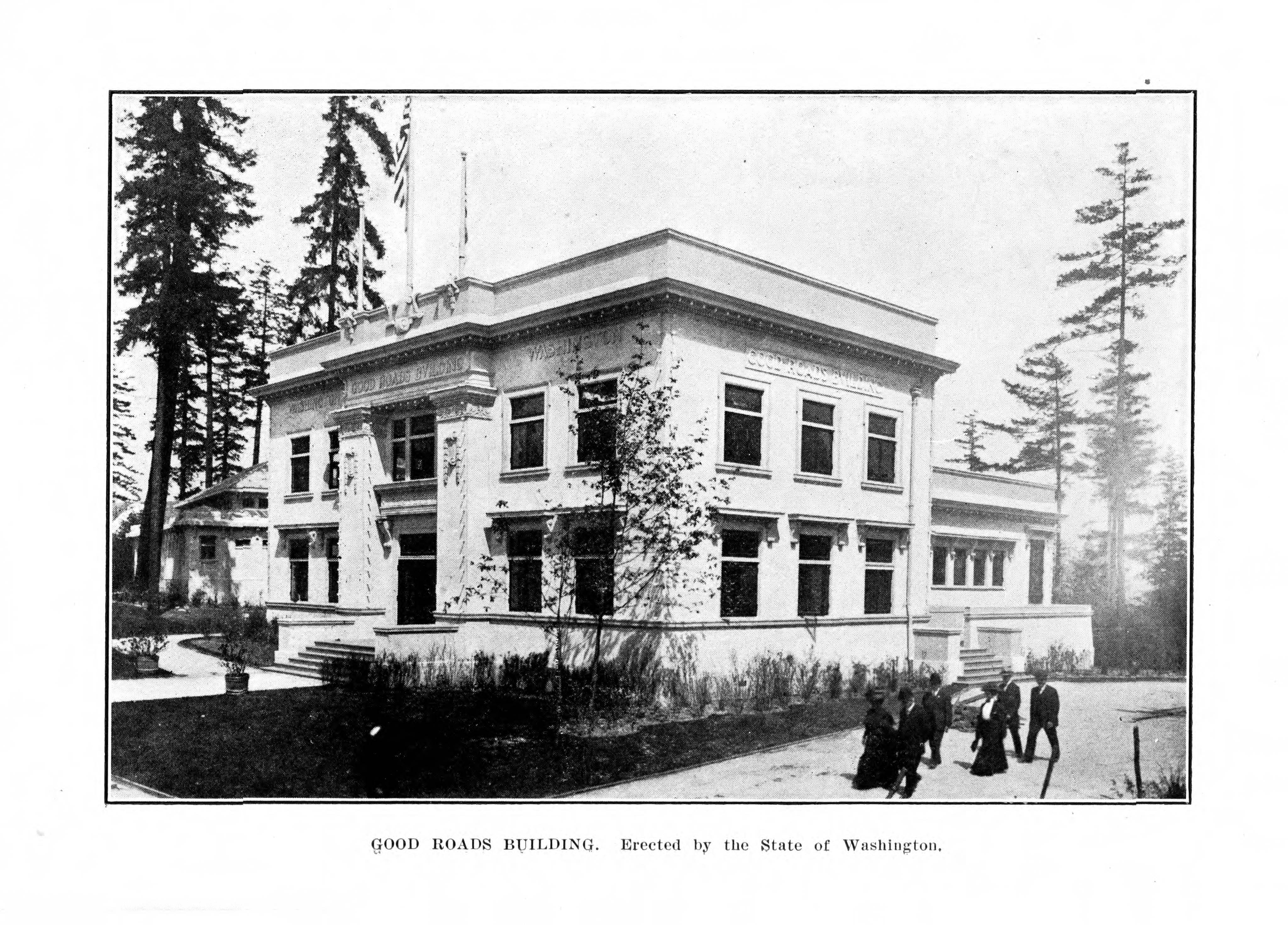
Good Roads Building at the Alaska–Yukon–Pacific Exposition of 1909

The Good Roads Movement occurred in the United States between the late 1870s and the 1920s. It was the rural dimension of the Progressive movement. The movement started as a coalition between farmers' organizations groups and bicyclists' organizations, such as the League of American Wheelmen. Advocates for improved roads turned local agitation into a national political movement. The goal was state and federal spending to improve rural roads. By 1910, automobile lobbies such as the American Automobile Association joined the campaign, coordinated by the National Good Roads Association.

Outside cities, roads were dirt or gravel; mud in the winter and dust in the summer. Travel was slow and expensive. Early organizers cited Europe where road construction and maintenance was supported by national and local governments. In its early years, the main goal of the movement was education for road building in rural areas between cities and to help rural populations gain the social and economic benefits enjoyed by cities where citizens benefited from railroads, trolleys and paved streets. Even more than traditional vehicles, the newly invented bicycles could benefit from good country roads.

== History ==
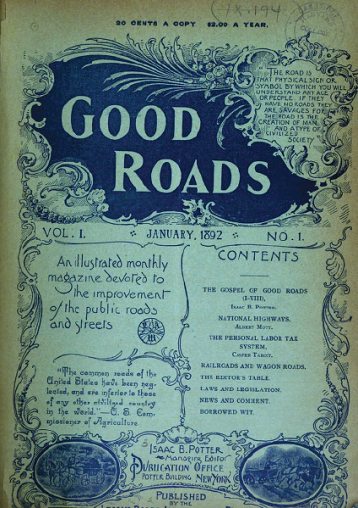
Good Roads magazine was an early advocate for road improvements.

The Good Roads Movement was officially founded in May 1880, when bicycle enthusiasts, riding clubs and manufacturers met in Newport, Rhode Island, to form the League of American Wheelmen to support the burgeoning use of bicycles and to protect their interests from legislative discrimination. The League quickly went national and in 1892 began publishing Good Roads magazine. In three years circulation reached one million. Early movement advocates enlisted the help of journalists, farmers, politicians and engineers in the project of improving the nation's roadways, but the movement took off when it was adopted by bicyclists.

Groups across the country held road conventions and public demonstrations, published material on the benefits of good roads and endeavored to influence legislators on local, state and national levels. Support for candidates often became crucial factors in elections. The League not only advocated road improvements for bicyclists, but pressed the idea to farmers and rural communities, publishing literature such as the famous pamphlet, The Gospel of Good Roads.

A key player was the United States Post Office Department. Once a commitment was made for Rural Free Delivery of the mail, the Post Office had to determine which local roads were suitable and which were not. Farmers living on officially unusable roads now had motivation to get them upgraded.

New Jersey became the first state to pass a law providing for a state to participate in road-building projects. In 1893, the U.S. Department of Agriculture initiated a systematic evaluation of existing highway systems. In that same year, Charles Duryea produced the first American gasoline-powered vehicle, and Rural Free Delivery began. By June 1894, "Many of the railway companies [had] made concessions in transporting road materials ranging from half rates to free carriage."

=== 20th century ===
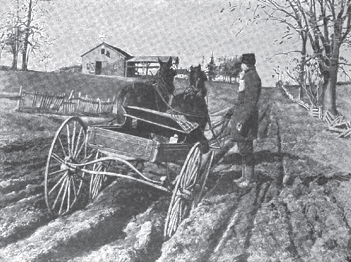
Advocacy efforts frequently focused on farmers' plight — Illinois, 1903

At the turn of the twentieth century, interest in the bicycle began to wane in the face of increasing interest in automobiles. Subsequently, other groups took the lead in the road lobby. As the automobile was developed and gained momentum, organizations developed such cross-county projects as the coast-to-coast east–west Lincoln Highway in 1913, headed by auto parts and auto racing magnate Carl G. Fisher, and later his north–south Dixie Highway in 1915, which extended from Canada to Miami, Florida.

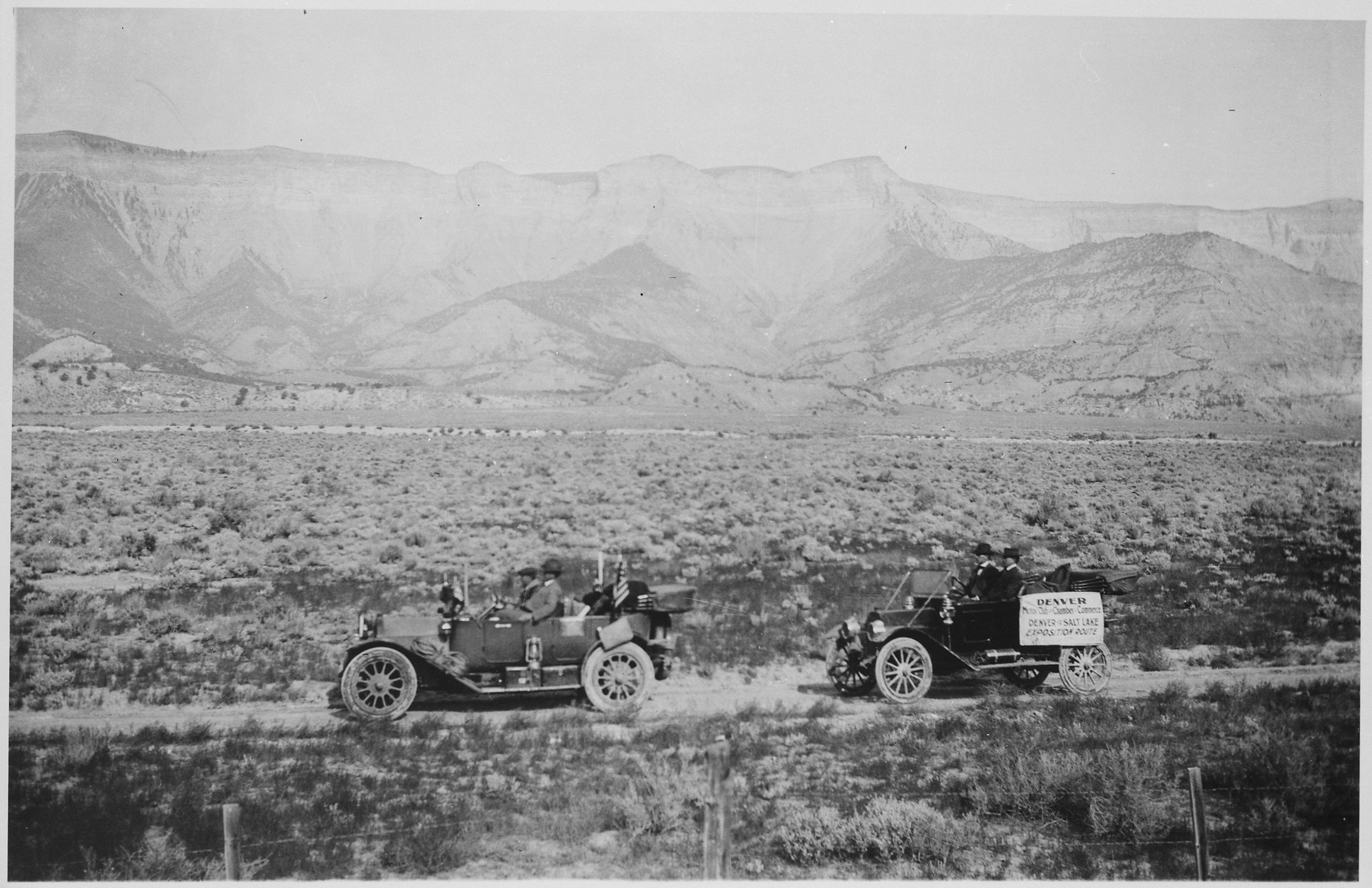
An AAA Good Roads official passes the only road sign on his transcontinental auto trip — Glendive, Montana, 1912

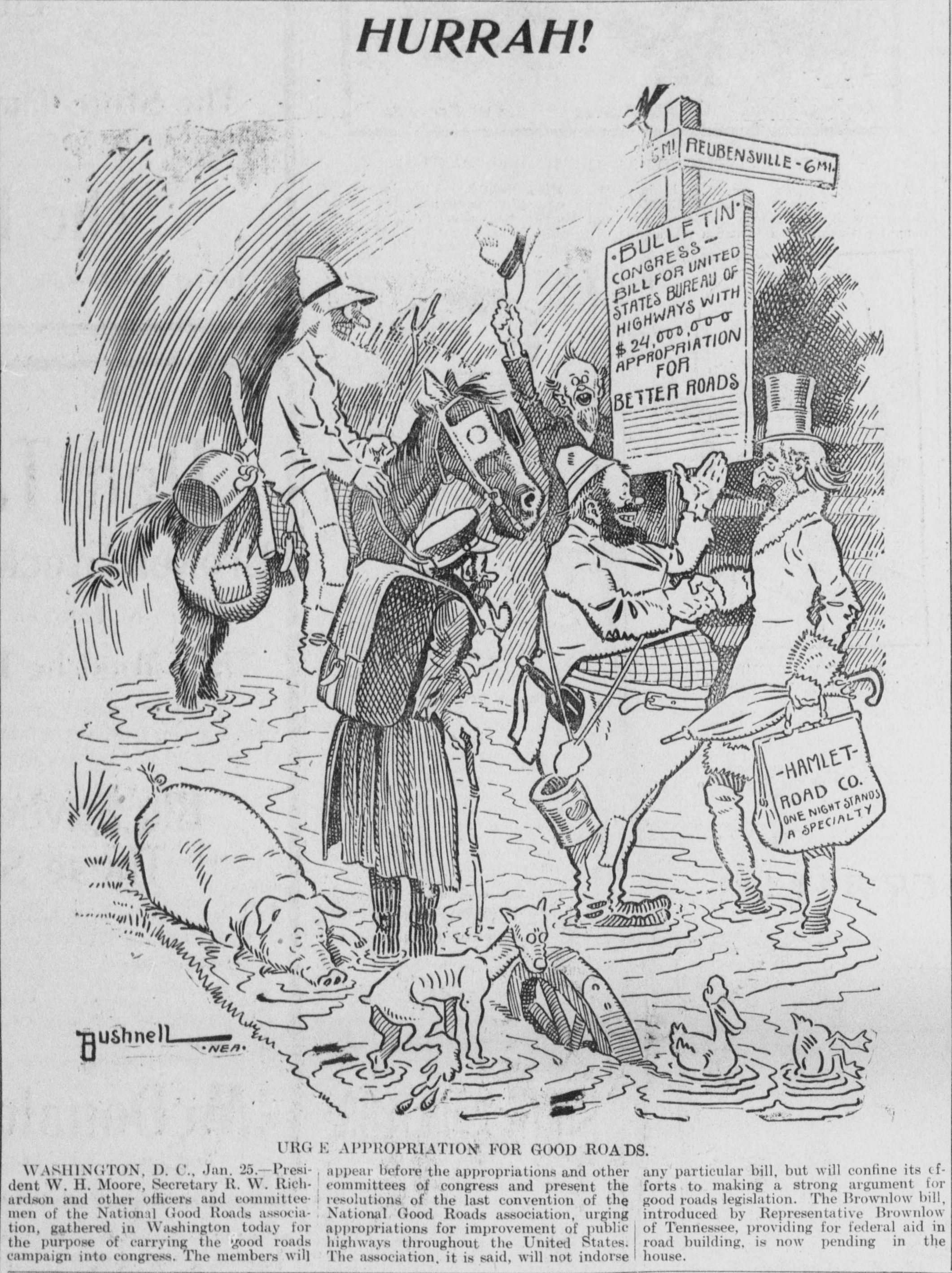
1904 editorial cartoon by E. A. Bushnell, urging that funds be appropriated for the goals of the Good Roads Movement

The movement gained national prominence when President Woodrow Wilson signed the Federal Aid Road Act of 1916 on July 11, 1916. In that year, the Buffalo Steam Roller Company of Buffalo, New York, and the Kelly-Springfield Company of Springfield, Ohio, merged to form the Buffalo-Springfield Company, which became the leader in the American compaction industry. Buffalo-Springfield enabled America to embark on a truly national highway construction campaign that continued into the 1920s.

Following World War One the US Government invigorated the movement by conducting a series of highly publicized Transcontinental Motor Convoys and distributing large numbers of war surplus trucks and motor vehicles to states and municipalities for road construction on the justification that improved roads were vital for national defense. Official observers assigned to the first 1919 Motor Transport Corps convoy included future U.S. President Lieutenant Colonel Dwight D. Eisenhower.

Horatio Earle is known as the "Father of Good Roads". Quoting from Earle's 1929 autobiography: "I often hear now-a-days, the automobile instigated good roads; that the automobile is the parent of good roads. Well, the truth is, the bicycle is the father of the good roads movement in this country." "The League fought for the privilege of building bicycle paths along the side of public highways." "The League fought for equal privileges with horse-drawn vehicles. All these battles were won and the bicyclist was accorded equal rights with other users of highways and streets."

=== State Good Roads associations ===
The 1920 Directory of American Agricultural Organizations lists the following state organizations as being affiliated with the Good Roads Movement:

- Alabama Good Roads Association
- Arizona Good Roads Association
- Central Florida Highway Association
- Good Roads Association of Wisconsin
- Illinois Association for Highway Improvement
- Kansas Good Roads Association
- Massachusetts Highway Association
- Michigan Pikes Association
- Michigan State Good Roads Association
- Montana Good Roads Congress
- Montana Highway Improvement Association
- Nebraska Good Roads Association
- Nevada Highway Association
- New Hampshire Good Roads Association
- New York Road Association
- North Carolina Good Roads Association
- Ohio Good Roads Federation
- Southeastern Idaho Good Roads Association
- Virginia Good Roads Association
- Washington State Good Roads Association
- Wilmington-Charlotte-Asheville Highway Association
- Wisconsin Highway Commissioners' Association
- Wyoming Good Roads Association

== See also ==
- U.S. Highway association
- Keystone Markers
- Seedling miles and the later "ideal section" of the Lincoln Highway
- Roads Improvement Association
