= Horatio Earle =

American politician

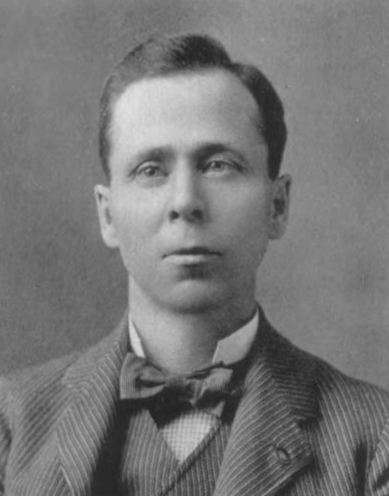
- Born: Horatio Sawyer Earle; February 14, 1855; Mount Holly, Vermont
- Died: December 25, 1935 (aged 80); Detroit, Michigan
- Occupation: Transport engineer
- Political party: Republican
- Spouse: Agnes Lincoln (m. 1874; died 1878)
- Children: 1

Horatio Sawyer Earle (1855–1935), known as the "Father of Good Roads" or simply Horatio "Good Roads" Earle, was an American transport engineer.

== Early life ==
Earle was born February 14, 1855, on a farm in Mount Holly, Vermont. He married Agnes Lincoln in 1874 and they had a son, Romeo Horatio Earle in 1878. Agnes died from tuberculosis later that year.

Earle worked a series of jobs until becoming a traveling salesman for farm equipment at age 31. He married Anna Maria Keyes in 1882 and they had a son, George Lewis Earle the following year. On January 5, 1889, the family moved to Detroit, Michigan, and shortly thereafter Earle began selling and developing agricultural implements.

== Road advocacy timeline 1898–1909 ==
- 1898: Appointed by Edward N. Hines, Chief Consul of the League of American Wheelmen (LAW) Michigan Division to chair a Good Roads committee.
- 1899: Unanimously elected Chief Consul with a platform to eliminate bicycle racing from the League and push the Good Roads Movement.
- 1900: Elected to the Michigan Senate as a LAW candidate.
- 1901: Introduced a Michigan Senate Resolution which created a State Highway Commission and was subsequently elected as chair.
- 1902: Proposed the Federal Government create an interstate highway system. Founded the American Road Makers (later to be renamed the American Road Builders Association (1910), and since 1977, known as the American Road and Transportation Builders Association).
- 1903: Appointed Commissioner of Highways by Michigan Governor Aaron T. Bliss.
- 1905: Introduced State Reward Road legislation, which created a State Highway Department currently known as the Michigan Department of Transportation (MDOT).
- 1906: Introduced legislation that created the Wayne County Road Board whose initial members were Cass R. Benton, Henry Ford, and Edward N. Hines.
- 1908: Lost Republican gubernatorial primary.
- 1909: Created the world's first mile of concrete road on Woodward Avenue in Detroit.

== Later years ==
Earle unsuccessfully ran for mayor of Detroit in 1912. He was vice-president of the Detroit Newsboys Association for 25 years and president of the National Exchange Club from 1919 to 1921. In 1920 he lost the Republican primary for Governor. His book The Autobiography of "by Gum" Earle was published in 1929. Earle died at his home in Detroit on December 25, 1935. State Highway M-53 in Michigan is called the Earle Memorial Highway in his honor.

== Quotes from Earle's 1929 autobiography ==
I often hear now-a-days, the automobile instigated good roads; that the automobile is the parent of good roads. Well, the truth is, the bicycle is the father of the good roads movement in this country.

...the League of American Wheelmen was formed in 1879, with each state organized as a division. The League was the first organization that promoted the building of better roads. The League fought for the privilege of building bicycle-paths along the side of public highways. The League fought for the privilege of carrying bicycles in baggage cars on railroads. The League fought for equal privileges with horse-drawn vehicles. All these battles were won and the bicyclist was accorded equal rights with other users of highways and streets.

== Michigan Registered Historical Site ==
A plaque honoring Earle's efforts is located in a government building complex in Lansing, Michigan, directly west from the Capitol along the "mall" that corresponds with Michigan Ave. The plaque is located northwest of the footbridge that crosses Walnut.

HORATIO EARLE -- In 1905, the year the State Highway Department was created, Michigan roads were quagmires of sand, mud, and clay that trapped horse-drawn vehicles and early automobiles alike. Bicycle clubs, such as the Leagues of American Wheelmen, led the effort to "reform" roads nationwide. In Michigan, the first state highway commissioner, Horatio "Good Roads" Earle (1855-1935), a bicyclist himself, vowed to conquer "the Mighty Monarch Mud." A former state senator, Earle served as state highway commissioner until 1909. Known as "the Father of Good Roads," Earle helped open the state to commerce and tourism. Monuments were erected in Cass City and Mackinaw City in his honor. Although appreciative, Earle stated "the monument I prize most is not measured by its height, but its length in miles".

Registered state site No. 688, 2005

Erected by Employees and Friends of MDOT in its Centennial Year, 2005

== Works ==
- Horatio Sawyer Earle (1929). The Autobiography of "By Gum" Earle. Lansing, Michigan: The State Review Publishing Company.
