= John McClure (producer) =

American record producer and engineer (1929–2014)

- Born: John Taylor McClure; June 28, 1929; Rahway, New Jersey, United States
- Died: June 17, 2014 (aged 84); Belmont, Vermont, United States
- Education: New York University
- Occupations: Record producer; recording engineer
- Known for: Recording classical, jazz and popular music
- Awards: Grammy Award for Best Classical Album (1962, 1965, 1967); Grammy Award for Best Musical Show Album (1985); Robert De Cormier Lifetime Achievement Award (2014)

John Taylor McClure (June 28, 1929 – June 17, 2014) was an American recording engineer and record producer, who worked in the fields of classical music, jazz, and popular music.

== Biography ==
McClure was born on June 28, 1929, in Rahway, New Jersey, United States. He had one brother. He grew up in nearby Colonia, New Jersey and learned to play the piano by ear. He later claimed that he never was very good at reading musical scores. He studied at Oberlin College and at New York University, but did not graduate. After working in a number of other jobs, he obtained a junior position with the Carnegie Hall Recording Company in 1950. He was soon employed as a recording engineer for Columbia Records and by the late 1950s became a producer. From the early 1970s, he operated in a freelance capacity.

He engineered Bruno Walter's cycle of the nine Beethoven symphonies with the Columbia Symphony Orchestra. He also worked on over thirty recordings with Igor Stravinsky, and around 200 with Leonard Bernstein. He oversaw recordings by the Boston Pops Orchestra under John Williams, as well as those of Aaron Copland, Isaac Stern, André Previn, and Rudolf Serkin.

Away from orchestral music, he also worked with the Mormon Tabernacle Choir, Dave Brubeck, Joe Williams, and Peter, Paul and Mary. In the late 1970s, he helped to record the strings on Pink Floyd's 1979 concept album, The Wall.

He was married four times. He married his fourth wife, Susan Presson, in 1991, and she outlived him. He had three sons and a daughter, and at the time of his death, three grandchildren. McClure died on June 17, 2014, at his home in Belmont, Vermont, where he kept his Grammy Awards in a box in his barn.

== Awards ==
His first Grammy Award for Best Classical Album was in 1962 for Stravinsky Conducts. An album he produced, Bernstein: Symphony No. 3 ‘Kaddish’, won the same award in 1965, and he won his third Grammy for a classical music album in 1968 for Mahler: Symphony No. 8: Symphony of a Thousand with Leonard Bernstein conducting the London Symphony Orchestra. He also won the Grammy Award for Best Cast Show Album in 1986 for the operatic version of West Side Story, conducted by Leonard Bernstein with José Carreras and Kiri Te Kanawa. In 2014, he was awarded the New York Choral Society's Robert De Cormier Lifetime Achievement Award.
