= Jan Hammer discography =

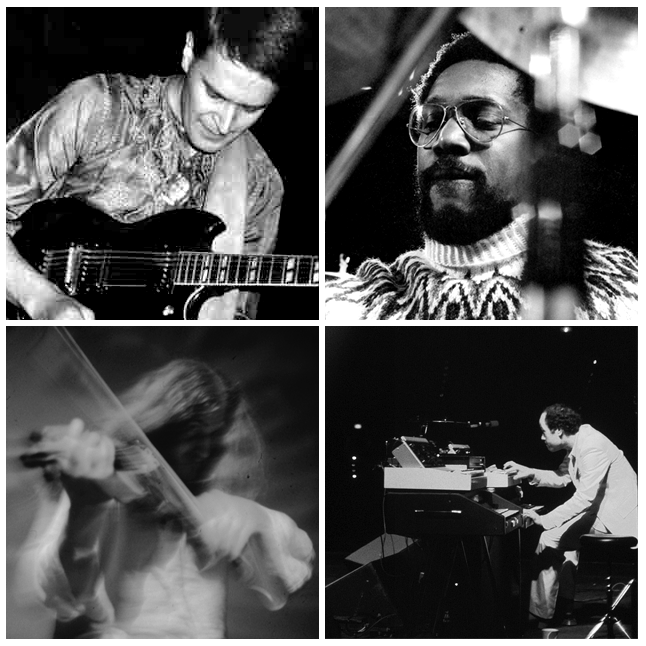
Jan Hammer (1976) bottom right

The discography of Czech-American musician Jan Hammer consists of 25 albums with Hammer as the lead artist, as well as several singles and a large number of collaborations with jazz and rock musicians, such as John McLaughlin, Jeff Beck, Al Di Meola, Mick Jagger, Carlos Santana, Stanley Clarke, Tommy Bolin, Neal Schon, Steve Lukather, and Elvin Jones among many others. He has composed and produced at least 14 original motion picture soundtracks, the music for 90 episodes of Miami Vice and 20 episodes of the popular British television series Chancer.

== As leader ==
List of albums, with selected chart positions
Title	Album details	Peak chart positions			
Title	Album details	US NA	US	GER	UK
The Jan Hammer Trio Malma Maliny	Released: 1968; Label: MPS Records; Note: (re-released in 1976 as Make Love)	—	—	—	—
Jerry Goodman and Jan Hammer Like Children	Released: 1974; Label: Nemperor / Sony	—	150	—	—
Jan Hammer The First Seven Days	Released: 1975; Label: Nemperor / Sony	—	—	—	—
Jan Hammer Group Oh Yeah?	Released: 1976; Label: Nemperor / Sony	—	—	—	—
Jan Hammer Group Jeff Beck with the Jan Hammer Group Live	Released: 1977; Label: Epic	—	—	—	—
Jan Hammer Group Melodies	Released: 1977; Label: Nemperor / Sony	—	—	—	—
Hammer Black Sheep	Released: 1978; Label: Elektra / Asylum	—	—	—	—
Hammer Hammer	Released: 1979; Label: Elektra / Asylum	—	—	—	—
David Earle Johnson with Jan Hammer Hip Address	Released: 1980	—	—	—	—
Neal Schon and Jan Hammer Untold Passion	Released: November 1981; Label: Columbia	—	115	—	—
Neal Schon and Jan Hammer Here to Stay	Released: December 1982; Label: Columbia	—	122	—	—
Jan Hammer Miami Vice	Released: 1985; Label: MCA	—	—	—	—
Jan Hammer The Early Years	Released: 1986; Label: Nemperor / Sony	—	—	—	—
Jan Hammer Escape from Television	Released: 1987; Label: MCA	—	—	14	34
Jan Hammer Snapshots	Released: 1989; Label: MCA	—	—	44	—
Jan Hammer Police Quest 3 Soundtrack (PC game)	Released: 1991; Label: Sierra	—	—	—	—
Jan Hammer BEYOND The Mind's Eye	Released: 1992; Label: Miramar / MCA	14	—	—	—
Jan Hammer Drive	Released: 1994; Label: Miramar	—	—	—	—
Jan Hammer Snapshots 1.2	Released: 2000; Label: One Way	—	—	—	—
Jan Hammer Miami Vice: The Complete Collection	Released: 2002; Label: One Way	—	—	—	—
Jan Hammer The First Seven Days	Released: 2003, remastered; Label: Columbia/Legacy	—	—	—	—
Jan Hammer The Best of Miami Vice	Released: 2004; Label: Reality Records	—	—	—	—
Jan Hammer Black Sheep/Hammer (2-CD Set)	Released: 2005; Label: Wounded Bird Records	—	—	—	—
Jan Hammer Project (Featuring TQ) "Crockett's Theme"	Released: 2006; Label: LuckySong/Sony/BMG	—	—	—	—
Jan Hammer "Cocaine Cowboys" Soundtrack	Released: 2007; Label: Red Gate Records	—	—	—	—
Jan Hammer Group "Live in New York"	Released: 2008; Label: Red Gate Records	—	—	—	—
Jan Hammer "Miami Vice: The Complete Collection"	Released: 2018; Label: Universal Music Group	—	—	—	—
Jan Hammer "Seasons, Pt. 1"	Released: 2018; Label: Universal Music Group	—	—	—	—
Jan Hammer ”Sketches in Jazz”	Released: 2020; Label: Red Gate Records	—	—	—	—
Jan Hammer "Seasons, Pt. 2"	Released: 2022; Label: Red Gate Records	—	—	—	—
"—" denotes releases that did not chart or were not released in that territory.

=== Singles ===
Year	Song	Peak chart positions									Album	Soundtrack
Year	Song	US	US A/C	CHE	GER	AUS	NLD	BE	NZ	UK	Album	Soundtrack
1976	"Oh, Yeah?"	—	—	—	—	—	—	—	—	—	Oh, Yeah?	—
1977	"Too Much to Lose"	—	—	—	—	—	—	—	—	—	Melodies	—
1977	"Don't You Know" (Jan Hammer Group)	—	—	—	—	—	—	—	—	—	Melodies	—
1979	"Oh, Pretty Woman"	—	—	—	—	—	—	—	—	—	Hammer	—
1985	"Miami Vice Theme"	1	16	8	5	14	22	20	8	5	Escape from Television	Miami Vice
1987	"Crockett's Theme"	—	42	9	4	—	1	1	—	2	Escape from Television	Miami Vice II
1987	"Tubbs and Valerie"	—	—	—	34	—	—	—	—	84	Escape from Television	Miami Vice: The Complete Collection
1987	"Forever Tonight"	—	—	—	62	—	74	—	—	—	Escape from Television	—
1988	"The Runner"	—	—	—	—	—	—	—	—	93	Snapshots	—
1989	"Eurocops"	—	—	—	—	—	—	—	—	—	Snapshots	—
1990	"Chancer" (TV theme)	—	—	—	—	—	—	—	—	—	—	—
1991	"Crockett's Theme 1991"	—	—	—	—	—	—	—	—	47	—	—
1993	"Seeds of Life"	—	—	—	—	—	—	—	—	—	Beyond the Mind's Eye	—
1993	"Midnight" (CD single)	—	—	—	—	—	—	—	—	—	Beyond the Mind's Eye	—
"—" denotes releases that did not chart or were not released in that territory.

== As sideman ==
With the Mahavishnu Orchestra (Columbia):

- The Inner Mounting Flame (1971)
- Birds of Fire (1973)
- Between Nothingness & Eternity (1973)
- The Best of The Mahavishnu Orchestra (1980)
- The Lost Trident Sessions (recorded 1973, released 1999)
- Unreleased Tracks from Between Nothingness & Eternity (recorded 1973, released 2011 in box set)

With Jeff Beck (Epic):

- Wired (1976)
- Jeff Beck with the Jan Hammer Group Live (1977)
- There & Back (1980)
- Flash (1985)
- Beckology (1991)
- The Best of Beck (1995)
- Who Else! (1999)

With Al Di Meola (Columbia):

- Elegant Gypsy (1977)
- Splendido Hotel (1980)
- Electric Rendezvous (1982)
- Tour De Force – Live (1982)
- Scenario (1984)
- The Electric Anthology (1995)
- This Is Jazz Volume 31 (1997)
- Anthology (2000)

With Elvin Jones

- Merry-Go-Round (Blue Note, 1971) – piano
- Mr. Jones (Blue Note, 1972) – piano
- The Prime Element (Blue Note, 1973) – keyboards
- On the Mountain (PM, 1975) – keyboards

With Jeremy Steig

- Energy (Capitol, 1971)
- Fusion (Groove Merchant, 1972)

With Frank Foster

- The Loud Minority (Mainstream, 1972)

With Carlos Santana and John McLaughlin (Columbia):

- Love Devotion Surrender (1973) – drums, percussion

With Billy Cobham (Atlantic):

- Spectrum (1973) – keyboards

With Stanley Clarke (Nemperor):

- Stanley Clarke (1974) – keyboards

With Steve Grossman (PM Records):

- Some Shapes to Come (1974) – Electric piano and moog synthesizer
- Terra Firma (1977) - Electric piano and moog synthesizer

With John Abercrombie (ECM):

- Timeless (recorded 1974, released 1975) – organ, synth, piano
- Night (1984) – keyboards

With Harvey Mason (Arista):

- Earth Mover (1975) – keyboards (Mini Moog)

With Tommy Bolin (Atlantic):

- Teaser (1975) – keyboards, drums
- From the Archives Vol. 1 (1996) – keyboards

With Charlie Mariano (MPS):

- Helen 12 Trees (1976) – keyboards (with Charlie Mariano - saxes & nagaswaram, Zbigniew Seifert - violin, John Marshall - drums, Jack Bruce - bass)

With Lenny White (Nemperor):

- Big City (1977) – keyboards

With Glen Moore (Elektra):

- Introducing Glen Moore (1978) – drums (with Glen Moore - double bass & piano, David Darling - cello, Zbigniew Seifert - violin)

With Joni Mitchell (Asylum):

- Mingus (1979) – Mini Moog

With Tony Williams (Columbia):

- The Joy of Flying (1979) – keyboards

With Yoshiaki Masuo (Electric Bird/King):

- Finger Dancing / Yoshiaki Masuo with Jan Hammer (Recorded 1980) – Oberheim, Minimoog, Yamaha CP70

With Mick Jagger (Columbia):

- She's the Boss (1985) – keyboards

With James Young (Passport):

- City Slicker (1985) – keyboards, drums

With Clarence Clemons (Columbia):

- An Evening With Mr. C (1989) – keyboards, drums

With Steve Lukather (Columbia):

- Lukather (1989) – keyboards

With The Freelance Hellraiser (Sony/BMG):

- Waiting for Clearance (2006) – keyboards

With Olaf Kübler (Enja)

- Turtles (Live at Domicile Vintage 1968) with George Mraz, Cees See, de:Michael Dennert
