= List of accolades received by Miami Vice =

Miami Vice awards and nominations
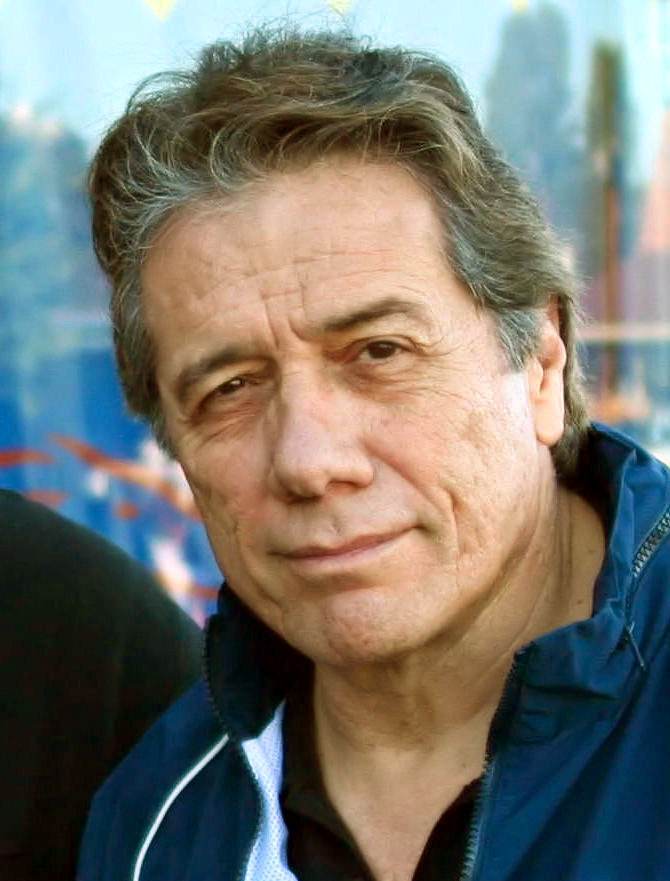
- Edward James Olmos received several awards for his work as Lieutenant Castillo.
Awards and nominations
Award	Wins	Nominations
Directors Guild of America Awards	0	1
Edgar Awards	0	1
Emmy Awards	4	20
Golden Globe Awards	2	7
Grammy Awards	2	2
People's Choice Awards	2	2

Totals (Note: Certain award groups do not simply award one winner. They acknowledge several different recipients, have runners-up, and have third place. Since this is a specific recognition and is different from losing an award, runner-up mentions are considered wins in this award tally. For simplification and to avoid errors, each award in this list has been presumed to have had a prior nomination.)
- Wins: 10
- Nominations: 33

Miami Vice is an American police procedural television series that aired on NBC for five seasons from 1984 and 1989, with an unaired episode airing on USA Network in 1990. Starring Philip Michael Thomas, Don Johnson, Edward James Olmos, Olivia Brown, Saundra Santiago, John Diehl and Michael Talbott, it focuses on the lives of two undercover Metro-Dade police officers, Ricardo Tubbs (Thomas) and James "Sonny" Crockett (Johnson). The series was created by Anthony Yerkovich, with Michael Mann and Dick Wolf serving as executive producers.

Since its debut, Miami Vice has received several award nominations, including twenty at the Emmy Awards, seven at the Golden Globe Awards, two People's Choice Awards and two Grammy Awards. Although lead actor Philip Michael Thomas coined the phrase "EGOT" for his ambitions to win Emmy, Grammy, Oscar and Tony Awards, only Johnson and Olmos won acting awards for their work on the series, while composer Jan Hammer earned two Grammy awards for his composition for the show's opening credits, "Miami Vice Theme". Of a total of thirty-three nominations earned by the series, it went on to win ten awards.

The series also spawned several successful soundtrack albums, with both Miami Vice and Miami Vice II charting in several countries worldwide; however Miami Vice III saw little success. Singles from these albums, including Jan Hammer's "Miami Vice Theme" and "Crockett's Theme", and Glenn Frey's "You Belong to the City", also performed well, although later singles by acts including Sheena Easton, Yello and The Hooters did not match the popularity of earlier releases.

== Directors Guild of America Awards ==
Director Paul Michael Glaser received a Directors Guild of America Award nomination for his work on the first-season episode "Smuggler's Blues". Glaser lost the award to Will Mackenzie, for his direction of the Moonlighting episode "My Fair David".

Year	Category	Nominee	Result	Ref
1985	Outstanding Directing – Drama Series	Paul Michael Glaser, "Smuggler's Blues"	Nominated	

== Edgar Awards ==
Series creator Anthony Yerkovich received an Edgar Award nomination for Best Episode in a TV Series, for his script to the pilot episode "Brother's Keeper". Yerkovich lost the award to Peter S. Fischer, for his Murder, She Wrote episode "Deadly Lady".

Year	Category	Nominee	Result	Ref
1985	Best Episode in a TV Series	Anthony Yerkovich, "Brother's Keeper"	Nominated	

== Emmy Awards ==
Miami Vice was the recipient of twenty Emmy Award nominations, winning four of these. Fifteen of these nominations, and all four wins, were received during the 37th Primetime Emmy Awards in 1985. Edward James Olmos earned a Primetime Emmy Award for Outstanding Supporting Actor in a Drama Series, alongside an Outstanding Cinematography for a Series award for Bob Collins, while the series also won ensemble awards for Outstanding Art Direction for a Series and Outstanding Film Sound Editing for a Series in that same year.

Jan Hammer's music for the series was honored with nominations in both 1985 and 1986, losing to Murder, She Wrote's John Addison and Scarecrow and Mrs. King's Arthur B. Rubinstein respectively. Lead actor Don Johnson received a 1985 nomination for Outstanding Lead Actor in a Drama Series for his role as James "Sonny" Crockett, losing to St. Elsewhere's William Daniels, for his portrayal of Mark Craig. Directors Lee H. Katzin and Paul Michael Glaser both vied for 1985's Outstanding Directing for a Drama Series award, which was ultimately won by Karen Arthur for her work on Cagney & Lacey.

Year	Category	Nominee(s)	Result	Ref
1985	Outstanding Achievement in Music Composition for a Series (Dramatic Underscore)	Jan Hammer	Nominated	
1985	Outstanding Art Direction for a Series	Jeffrey Howard, Robert Lacey Jr.	Won	
1985	Outstanding Cinematography for a Series	Bob Collins	Won	
1985	Outstanding Cinematography for a Series	A.J. "Duke" Callaghan	Nominated	
1985	Outstanding Costume Design for a Series	Jodie Tillen	Nominated	
1985	Outstanding Directing for a Drama Series	Lee H. Katzin	Nominated	
1985	Outstanding Directing for a Drama Series	Paul Michael Glaser	Nominated	
1985	Outstanding Drama Series	Richard Brams, George E. Crosby, Michael Mann, John Nicolella, Liam O'Brien. Mel Swope, Anthony Yerkovich	Nominated	
1985	Outstanding Film Editing for a Series	Michael B. Hoggan	Nominated	
1985	Outstanding Film Editing for a Series	Robert A. Daniels	Nominated	
1985	Outstanding Film Sound Editing for a Series	Bruce Bell, Jerry Sanford Cohen, Victor B. Lackey, Ian MacGregor-Scott, Carl Mahakian, Chuck Moran, John Oettinger, Bernie Pincus, Warren Smith, Bruce Stambler, Mike Wilhoit, Paul Wittenberg, Kyle Wright	Won	
1985	Outstanding Film Sound Editing for a Series	Jerry Sanford Cohen, Scott Hecker, John A. Larsen, Harry B. Miller III, Robert Rutledge, Norto Sepulveda, Gary Vaughan, Jay Wilkinson	Nominated	
1985	Outstanding Lead Actor in a Drama Series	Don Johnson	Nominated	
1985	Outstanding Supporting Actor in a Drama Series	Edward James Olmos	Won	
1985	Outstanding Writing for a Drama Series	Anthony Yerkovich	Nominated	
1986	Outstanding Achievement in Music Composition for a Series (Dramatic Underscore)	Jan Hammer	Nominated	
1986	Outstanding Editing for a Series (Single Camera Production)	Robert A. Daniels	Nominated	
1986	Outstanding Sound Mixing for a Drama Series	Rick Alexander, Anthony Costantini, Daniel Leahy, Mike Tromer	Nominated	
1986	Outstanding Supporting Actor in a Drama Series	Edward James Olmos	Nominated	
1988	Outstanding Sound Mixing for a Drama Series	Joe Citarella, Joe Foglia, Grover Helsley, Ray West	Nominated	

== Golden Globe Awards ==
Miami Vice received seven Golden Globe Award nominations during its tenure, winning two of these. Olmos and Johnson won Best Supporting Actor and Best Actor awards respectively in 1985, with Johnson defeating co-star Philip Michael Thomas for the award. Thomas' nomination was to be the only one for his Miami Vice work, although the actor had earlier coined the phrase "EGOT" to describe his ambitions to win Emmy, Grammy, Oscar and Tony Awards in his career. Only Olmos and Hammer won any of these awards, earning an Emmy and a Grammy respectively.

Johnson and Olmos each received a further nomination in their respective categories, with Johnson losing a 1986 nomination to Edward Woodward as The Equalizer's Robert McCall; and Olmos missing out on the 1988 award to both John Gielgud and Barry Bostwick for their work on the miniseries War and Remembrance. The series as a whole was nominated for the Best Television Series – Drama award twice, losing to Murder, She Wrote in 1985 and L.A. Law in 1986.

Year	Category	Nominee	Result	Ref
1985	Best Supporting Actor – Series, Miniseries or Television Film	Edward James Olmos	Won	
1985	Best Actor – Drama	Don Johnson	Won	
1985	Best Actor – Drama	Philip Michael Thomas	Nominated	
1985	Best Television Series – Drama	—	Nominated	
1986	Best Actor – Drama	Don Johnson	Nominated	
1986	Best Television Series – Drama	—	Nominated	
1988	Best Supporting Actor – Series, Miniseries or Television Film	Edward James Olmos	Nominated	

== Grammy Awards ==
Series composer Hammer won two Grammy Awards at the 28th Grammy Awards ceremony. His composition "Miami Vice Theme", used during the series' opening credits sequence, earned him both the Best Pop Instrumental Performance and Best Instrumental Composition awards.

Year	Category	Nominee	Result	Ref
1985	Best Instrumental Composition	Jan Hammer, "Miami Vice Theme"	Won	
1985	Best Pop Instrumental Performance	Jan Hammer, "Miami Vice Theme"	Won	

== Music charts ==
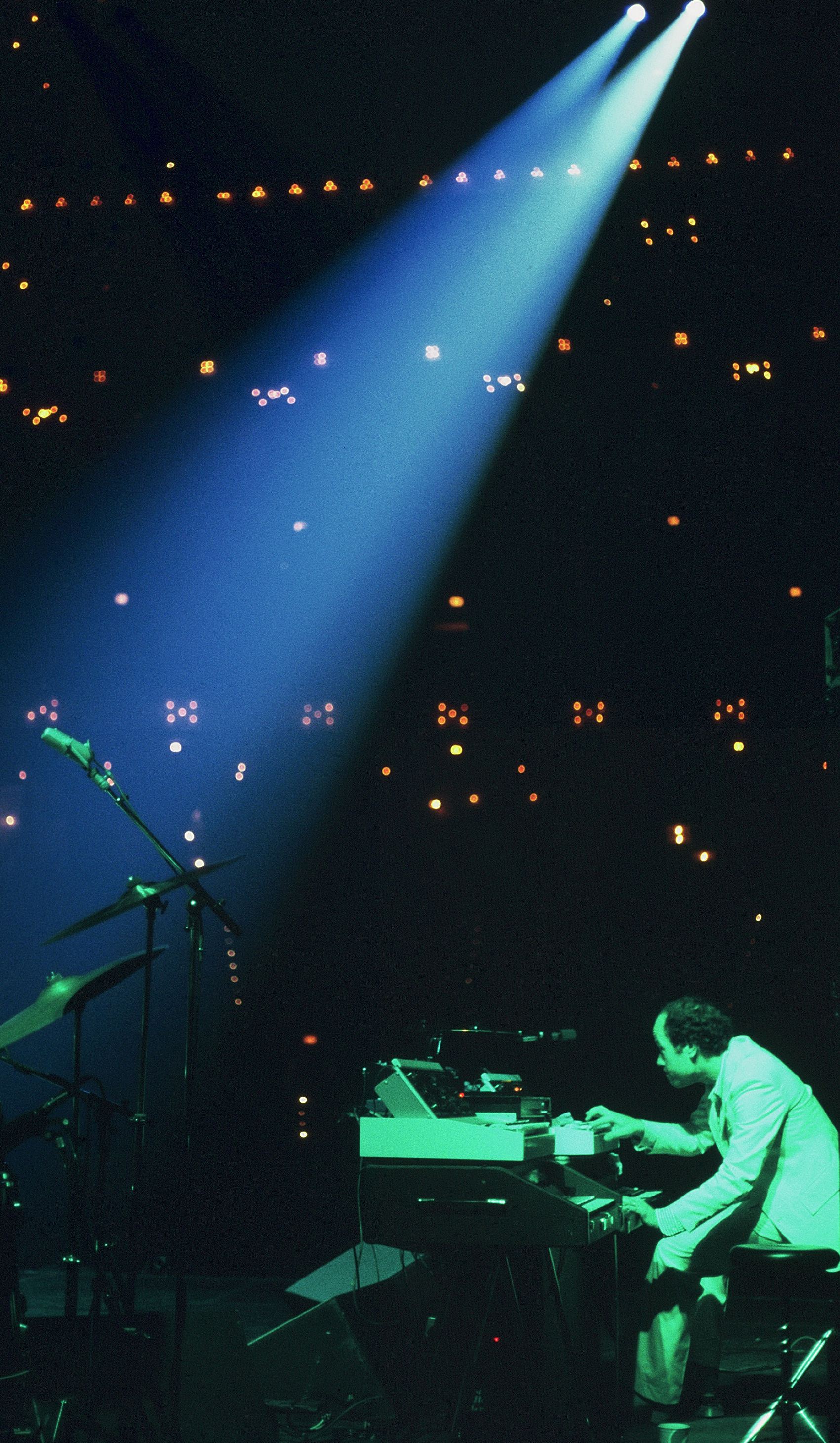
Jan Hammer's soundtrack work for the series had success in both music charts and at the Grammy awards.

A number of soundtrack albums were released during the series' run. Of these, both Miami Vice and Miami Vice II have placed in a number of sales charts. Miami Vice, released on October 26, 1985, reached the top of the Billboard 200 chart in the United States, while several of its singles also found a degree of success. The follow-up compilation Miami Vice II, released on December 29, 1986, reached a peak position of 82 on the Billboard 200, also spawning several charting singles. The albums were also popular globally, reaching top ten positions in New Zealand, Austria, the Netherlands, and Switzerland.

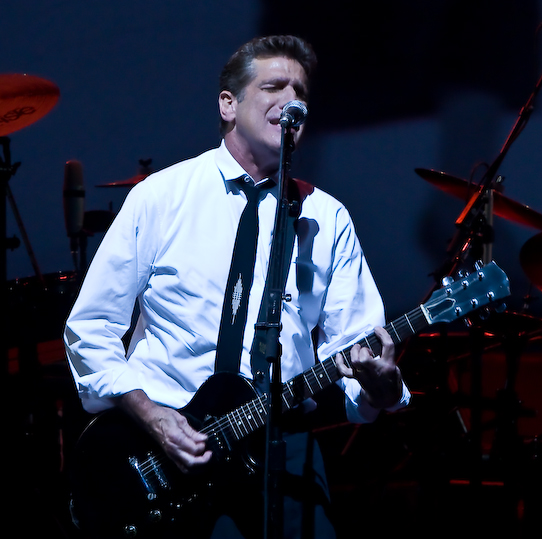
Glenn Frey released several singles from the Miami Vice soundtrack albums.

Hammer's "Miami Vice Theme" reached number one on the United States' Billboard Hot 100 singles chart, while "Crockett's Theme" was successful in both the UK Singles Chart, reaching number two, and the Dutch Top 40, reaching number one. Glenn Frey also released several singles featured in the series, with "Smuggler's Blues" reaching a peak of 22 in the UK Singles Charts, and "You Belong to the City" peaking at number two on the American Adult Contemporary chart.

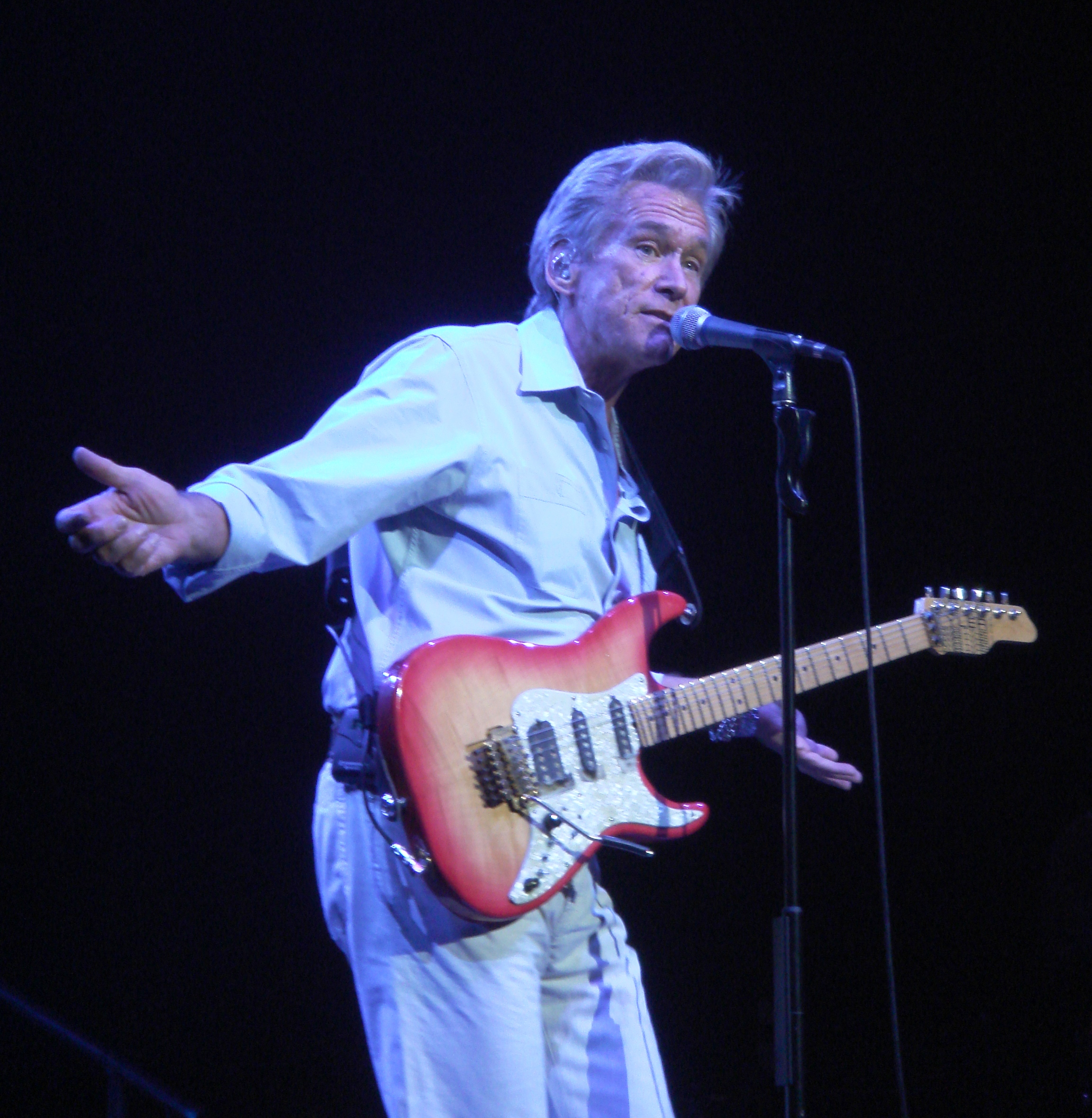

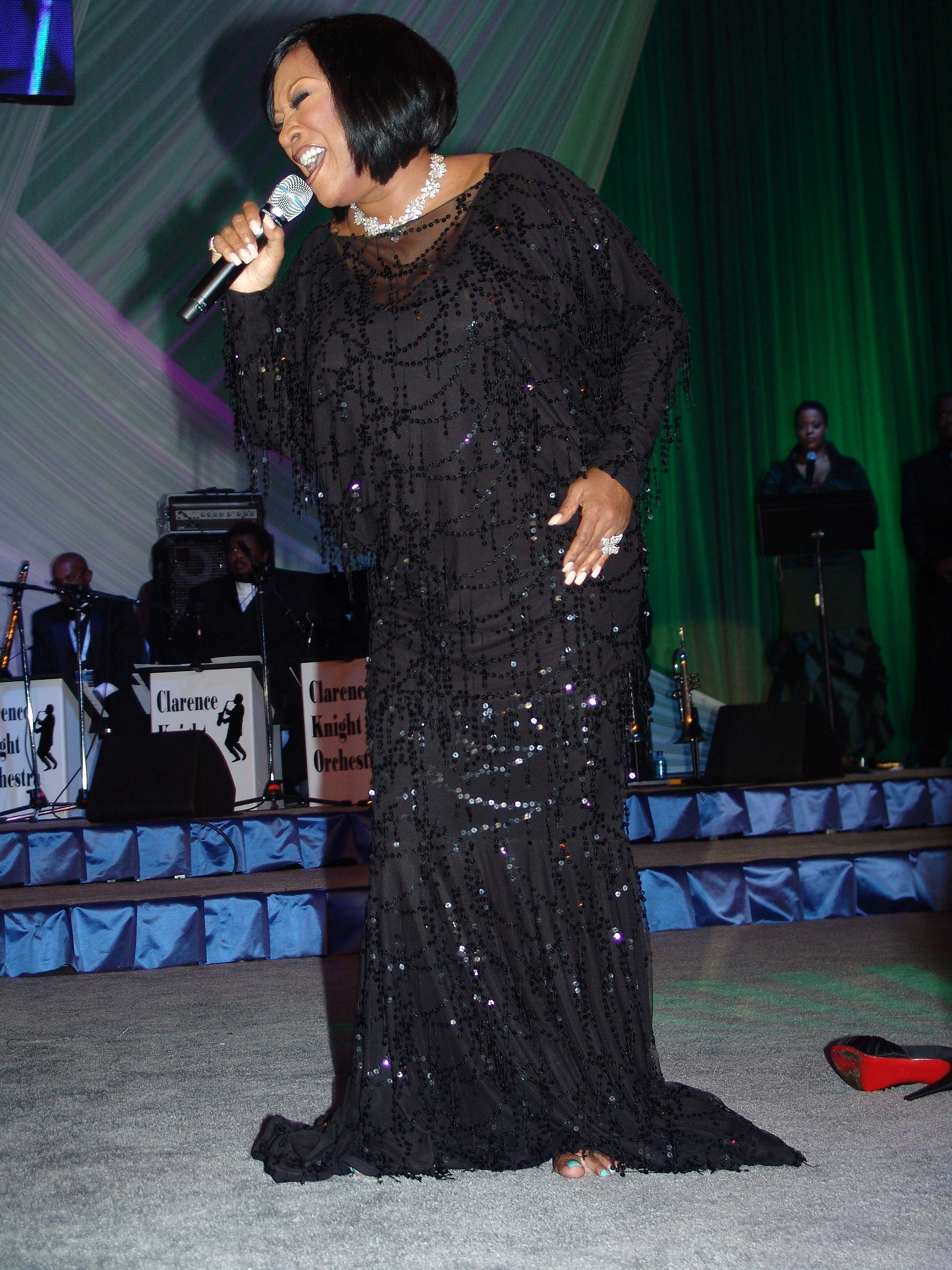
Patti LaBelle (bottom) and Bill Champlin (top) collaborated on "The Last Unbroken Heart".

=== Albums ===
Release	Chart	Country	Peak position
Miami Vice	Billboard 200	United States	1
Miami Vice	Top R&B Albums	United States	9
Miami Vice	Official New Zealand Music Chart	New Zealand	5
Miami Vice	Ö3 Austria Top 40	Austria	1
Miami Vice	Mega Album Top 100	The Netherlands	18
Miami Vice	Sverigetopplistan	Sweden	32
Miami Vice II	Billboard 200	United States	82
Miami Vice II	Ö3 Austria Top 40	Austria	6
Miami Vice II	Mega Album Top 100	The Netherlands	2
Miami Vice II	Swiss Music Charts	Switzerland	4
Miami Vice III	Ö3 Austria Top 40	Austria	25

=== Singles ===
Release	Album	Artist	Chart	Country	Peak position
"Miami Vice Theme"	Miami Vice	Jan Hammer	Billboard Hot 100	United States	1
"Miami Vice Theme"	Miami Vice	Jan Hammer	Adult Contemporary	United States	16
"Miami Vice Theme"	Miami Vice	Jan Hammer	Hot Dance Club Songs	United States	23
"Miami Vice Theme"	Miami Vice	Jan Hammer	Hot Dance Music/Maxi-Singles	United States	7
"Miami Vice Theme"	Miami Vice	Jan Hammer	Hot R&B/Hip-Hop Songs	United States	10
"Miami Vice Theme"	Miami Vice	Jan Hammer	Hot Mainstream Rock Tracks	United States	29
"Miami Vice Theme"	Miami Vice	Jan Hammer	Swiss Music Charts	Switzerland	8
"Miami Vice Theme"	Miami Vice	Jan Hammer	Ö3 Austria Top 40	Austria	4
"Miami Vice Theme"	Miami Vice	Jan Hammer	Dutch Top 40	The Netherlands	22
"Miami Vice Theme"	Miami Vice	Jan Hammer	Official New Zealand Music Chart	New Zealand	8
"Miami Vice Theme"	Miami Vice	Jan Hammer	UK Singles Chart	United Kingdom	5
"Own the Night"	Miami Vice	Chaka Khan	Billboard Hot 100	United States	66
"Own the Night"	Miami Vice	Chaka Khan	Hot R&B/Hip-Hop Songs	United States	57
"Vice"	Miami Vice	Melle Mel	Hot R&B/Hip-Hop Songs	United States	90
"You Belong to the City"	Miami Vice	Glenn Frey	Adult Contemporary	United States	2
"You Belong to the City"	Miami Vice	Glenn Frey	Dutch Top 40	The Netherlands	37
"You Belong to the City"	Miami Vice	Glenn Frey	Official New Zealand Music Chart	New Zealand	46
"Smuggler's Blues"	Miami Vice	Glenn Frey	UK Singles Chart	United Kingdom	22
"The Last Unbroken Heart"	Miami Vice II	Patti LaBelle & Bill Champlin	Adult Contemporary	United States	15
"Send It to Me"	Miami Vice II	Gladys Knight & The Pips	Hot R&B/Hip-Hop Songs	United States	14
"When The Rain Comes Down"	Miami Vice II	Andy Taylor	Billboard Hot 100	United States	73
"Crockett's Theme"	Miami Vice II	Jan Hammer	UK Singles Chart	United Kingdom	2
"Crockett's Theme"	Miami Vice II	Jan Hammer	Dutch Top 40	The Netherlands	1
"Crockett's Theme"	Miami Vice II	Jan Hammer	Ö3 Austria Top 40	Austria	29
"Crockett's Theme"	Miami Vice II	Jan Hammer	Swiss Music Charts	Switzerland	9
"Follow My Rainbow"	Miami Vice III	Sheena Easton	Dutch Top 40	The Netherlands	14
"Call It Love"	Miami Vice III	Yello	Official New Zealand Music Chart	New Zealand	32
"Call It Love"	Miami Vice III	Yello	Ö3 Austria Top 40	Austria	19
"Call It Love"	Miami Vice III	Yello	Swiss Music Charts	Switzerland	6
"Dirty Laundry"	Miami Vice III	Don Henley	Official New Zealand Music Chart	New Zealand	7
"Dirty Laundry"	Miami Vice III	Don Henley	Ö3 Austria Top 40	Austria	8
"Satellite"	Miami Vice III	The Hooters	Dutch Top 40	The Netherlands	20

== People's Choice Awards ==
Miami Vice won two People's Choice Awards, earning the award for Favorite New TV Dramatic Program at the 1985 ceremony, and following this up with a win for Favorite TV Dramatic Program the following year.

Year	Category	Result	Ref
1985	Favorite New TV Dramatic Program	Won	
1986	Favorite TV Dramatic Program	Won	
