= Jeff Beck with the Jan Hammer Group Live =

Live album by Jeff Beck with the Jan Hammer Group
- Released: March 1977
- Recorded: US tour, Summer and/or Fall 1976
- Genres: Blues rock, rock, Jazz fusion
- Length: 44:31
- Label: Epic (PE34433)
- Producer: Jan Hammer

Jeff Beck chronology
Wired (1976)	Jeff Beck with the Jan Hammer Group Live (1977)	There & Back (1980)

Professional ratings
Review scores
Source	Rating
Allmusic	2/5 stars

Jeff Beck with the Jan Hammer Group Live is a live album by Jeff Beck, released in 1977 on Epic Records.

== Recording ==
The album featured live versions of three tracks from the Jeff Beck 1975 studio album Blow by Blow, "Scatterbrain", "Freeway Jam", and "She's a Woman" plus four compositions by Jan Hammer, "Darkness/Earth in Search of a Sun" from the 1975 album The First Seven Days, "Full Moon Boogie" and "Earth (Still Our Only Home)" from the 1974 album Like Children by Jan Hammer and Jerry Goodman, and "Blue Wind" from the 1976 Jeff Beck studio album Wired.

No precise dates and locations are given for the live recordings. The tour began in June 1976 and ended in February 1977, with 117 shows performed.

A&R man Tom Werman suggested that the date at the Astor Theater in Reading, PA (31 August 1976) yielded the best performances, and was going to provide the bulk of the album at the time of his involvement in the project. Beck mixed this along with other recordings at Allen Toussaint's studio in New Orleans.

Then Jan Hammer decided to mix the album himself, and did so with Dennis Weinreich at Scorpio Sound Studios in London, England.

The stereo spectrum of this album duplicates the stage set-up with guitar positioned center right, keyboards center left, violin right and drums and bass center.

== Reception ==
The album peaked at number 23 on the Billboard 200 album chart, number 24 on the Canadian RPM chart, number 67 on the Kent Music Report in Australia, and number 9 on the Japanese chart. The album was certified Gold in the U.S. by the RIAA.

== Track listing ==
Side one
No.	Title	Writer(s)	Length
1.	"Freeway Jam"	Max Middleton	7:21
2.	"Earth (Still Our Only Home)"	Jan Hammer	4:34
3.	"She's a Woman"	John Lennon, Paul McCartney	4:25
4.	"Full Moon Boogie"	Hammer, Jerry Goodman	6:07

Side two
No.	Title	Writer(s)	Length
5.	"Darkness/Earth in Search of a Sun"	Hammer	7:52
6.	"Scatterbrain"	Middleton, Jeff Beck	7:25
7.	"Blue Wind"	Hammer	6:20
Total length:			44:31

== Personnel ==
- Jeff Beck - guitars, bass guitar, special effects

The Jan Hammer Group

- Jan Hammer - Moog, Oberheim and Freeman string symphonizer synthesizers, electric piano, timbales; lead vocals on "Earth (Still Our Only Home)"
- Tony "Thunder" Smith - drums; lead vocals on "Full Moon Boogie"
- Fernando Saunders - bass guitar, harmony vocals; rhythm guitar on "She's A Woman"
- Steve Kindler - violin; string synthesizer on "Darkness"; rhythm guitar on "Blue Wind"

== Charts ==
Chart (1977)	Peak position
Australian Albums (Kent Music Report)	67
Canada Top Albums/CDs (RPM)	24
Japanese Albums (Oricon)	9
US Billboard 200	23

== Certifications ==
Region	Certification	Certified units/sales
United States (RIAA)	Gold	500,000^{^}
^{^} Shipments figures based on certification alone.
