= The First Seven Days =

Studio album by Jan Hammer
- Released: June 30, 1975
- Recorded: 1975
- Studio: Red Gate Studio, Kent, New York
- Genre: Jazz fusion
- Label: Nemperor Records/Atlantic Records
- Producer: Jan Hammer

Jan Hammer chronology
| Like Children (1974) | The First Seven Days (1975) | Oh Yeah? (1976) |

Professional ratings
Review scores
| Source | Rating |
|---|---|
| Allmusic | 4/5 stars |
| The Rolling Stone Jazz Record Guide | 4/5 stars |

The First Seven Days is an album recorded by jazz musician Jan Hammer in 1975. It features extensive use of synthesizers, including the synthesized "guitar" parts (as on his follow-up album, Oh Yeah?), with the record jacket stating, "For those concerned: there is no guitar on this album." Other instruments used are grand piano, electric violin and percussion.

It is a musical telling of the Genesis creation story. The record jacket continues with "Assuming that each of these "days" lasted anywhere from one day to a hundred million years, the scientific and biblical views do meet in certain points. These points were the inspiration for this album, and, besides, they provided me with an excuse to write seven new pieces of music."

== Track listing ==
All tracks composed by Jan Hammer
(On the LP version, side 2 begins with track 5.)

1. "Darkness/Earth in Search of a Sun" (4:30)
2. "Light/Sun" (6:40)
3. "Oceans and Continents" (6:14)
4. "Fourth Day — Plants and Trees" (2:44)
5. "The Animals" (6:09)
6. "Sixth Day — the People" (7:11)
7. "The Seventh Day" (6:08)

== Personnel ==
- Jan Hammer - producer, engineer, piano, electric piano, Moog synthesizer, Oberheim synthesizer and digital sequencer, drums, percussion, Freeman string synthesizer (sic), Mellotron
- David Earle Johnson - congas & percussion (tracks 5 and 6)
- Steven Kindler - violin (tracks 2, 5, 6, and 7)

== Production ==
- Recorded at Red Gate Studios, Kent, New York
- Andy Topeka - assistant engineer, custom audio installations
- Milton Glaser - cover illustration
- Paula Scher - art direction
