= List of Miami Vice soundtracks =

The following is a list of soundtrack releases for the American crime drama television series Miami Vice (1984–1990).

== Miami Vice ==
Miami Vice

Soundtrack album by various artists
- Released: October 1985
- Genres: Pop rock; synth-pop
- Label: MCA
- Producers: Allan Blazek; Phil Collins; Glenn Frey; Melvin Glover; Jan Hammer; Rupert Hine; Arif Mardin; Joe Mardin; Leland Robinson

Singles from Miami Vice
- 1. "Miami Vice Theme" Released: August 1985; 2. "You Belong to the City" Released: September 1985

Professional ratings
Review scores
Source	Rating
AllMusic	3/5 stars

No.	Title	Writer(s)	Producer(s)	Length
1.	"The Original Miami Vice Theme" (Instrumental) (performed by Jan Hammer)	Hammer	Hammer	1:00
2.	"Smuggler's Blues" (performed by Glenn Frey)	Frey; Jack Tempchin	Frey; Allan Blazek	3:48
3.	"Own the Night" (performed by Chaka Khan)	Franne Golde; M.D. Lauria; Marti Sharron	Arif Mardin; Joe Mardin	4:49
4.	"You Belong to the City" (performed by Glenn Frey)	Frey; Tempchin	Frey	5:49
5.	"In the Air Tonight" (performed by Phil Collins)	Collins	Collins	5:27
6.	"Miami Vice" (Instrumental) (performed by Jan Hammer)	Hammer	Hammer	2:27
7.	"Vice" (performed by Grandmaster Melle Mel)	Melvin Glover; Leland Robinson; Sylvia Robinson	Glover; L. Robinson	4:59
8.	"Better Be Good to Me" (performed by Tina Turner)	Mike Chapman; Nicky Chinn; Holly Knight	Rupert Hine	5:08
9.	"Flashback" (Instrumental) (performed by Jan Hammer)	Hammer	Hammer	3:20
10.	"Chase" (Instrumental) (performed by Jan Hammer)	Hammer	Hammer	2:38
11.	"Evan" (Instrumental) (performed by Jan Hammer)	Hammer	Hammer	3:06

=== Charts ===
Weekly chart performance for Miami Vice
Chart (1985–1987)	Peak position
Australia (Kent Music Report)	17
Austrian Albums (Ö3 Austria)	1
Canada Top Albums/CDs (RPM)	1
Dutch Albums (Album Top 100)	18
European Albums (Music & Media)	32
Finnish Albums (Suomen virallinen lista)	38
German Albums (Offizielle Top 100)	7
Icelandic Albums (Tónlist)	10
New Zealand Albums (RMNZ)	5
UK Albums (Official Charts)	11
US Billboard 200	1

1985 year-end chart performance for Miami Vice
Chart (1985)	Position
Canada Top Albums/CDs (RPM)	16
New Zealand Albums (RMNZ)	41

1986 year-end chart performance for Miami Vice
Chart (1986)	Position
Australian Albums (Kent Music Report)	83
Canada Top Albums/CDs (RPM)	69
New Zealand Albums (RMNZ)	37
US Billboard 200	25
US Soundtrack Albums (Billboard)	2

1987 year-end chart performance for Miami Vice
Chart (1987)	Position
Austrian Albums (Ö3 Austria)	15
European Albums (Music & Media)	91
German Albums (Offizielle Top 100)	47
New Zealand Albums (RMNZ)	41

=== Certifications ===
Certifications for Miami Vice
Region	Certification	Certified units/sales
Austria (IFPI Austria)	Gold	25,000^{*}
Canada (Music Canada)	3× Platinum	300,000^{^}
New Zealand (RMNZ)	Platinum	15,000^{^}
United Kingdom (BPI)	Gold	100,000^{^}
United States (RIAA)	4× Platinum	4,000,000^{^}
^{*} Sales figures based on certification alone.^{^} Shipments figures based on certification alone.

== Miami Vice II ==
Miami Vice II

Soundtrack album by various artists
- Released: November, 1986
- Genres: Pop rock; synth-pop
- Length: 43:11
- Label: MCA
- Producers: Stephen Bray; Jackson Browne; Phil Collins; Rhett Davies; Jay Graydon; Jan Hammer; Steve Jones; Jon Kelly; Hugh Padgham; Howie Rice; Bob Rose; Roxy Music; Andy Taylor; Michael Verdick

Professional ratings
Review scores
Source	Rating
AllMusic	2/5 stars

No.	Title	Writer(s)	Producer(s)	Length
1.	"Mercy" (performed by Steve Jones)	Jones	Bob Rose	4:27
2.	"Send It to Me" (performed by Gladys Knight & the Pips)	Allee Willis; Lauren Wood	Michael Verdick; Stephen Bray; Howie Rice	4:12
3.	"Take Me Home" (performed by Phil Collins)	Collins	Collins; Hugh Padgham	5:51
4.	"The Last Unbroken Heart" (performed by Patti LaBelle and Bill Champlin)	Paul Gordon; Joseph Williams; Jay Gruska	Jay Graydon	3:53
5.	"Crockett's Theme" (Instrumental) (performed by Jan Hammer)	Hammer	Hammer	3:25
6.	"When the Rain Comes Down" (performed by Andy Taylor)	Taylor; Jones	Taylor; Jones; George Tutko^{[a]}	3:52
7.	"Lover" (performed by Roxy Music)	Bryan Ferry; Phil Manzanera	Roxy Music; Rhett Davies	3:52
8.	"Lives in the Balance" (performed by Jackson Browne)	Browne	Browne	4:13
9.	"In Dulce Decorum" (performed by The Damned)	The Damned	Jon Kelly	4:34
10.	"Miami Vice: New York Theme" (Instrumental) (performed by Jan Hammer)	Hammer	Hammer	3:53
11.	"The Original Miami Vice Theme" (Instrumental) (performed by Jan Hammer)	Hammer	Hammer	0:59

Notes

- ^{^[a]} signifies a co-producer

=== Charts ===
Weekly chart performance for Miami Vice II
Chart (1987)	Peak position
Austrian Albums (Ö3 Austria)	6
Dutch Albums (Album Top 100)	2
European Albums (Music & Media)	24
Finnish Albums (Suomen virallinen lista)	27
German Albums (Offizielle Top 100)	8
Swiss Albums (Schweizer Hitparade)	4
UK Albums (Official Charts)	71
US Billboard 200	82

Year-end chart performance for Miami Vice II
Chart (1987)	Position
Austrian Albums (Ö3 Austria)	28
Dutch Albums (Album Top 100)	7
European Albums (Music & Media)	39
German Albums (Offizielle Top 100)	18
Swiss Albums (Schweizer Hitparade)	28

=== Certifications ===
Certifications for Miami Vice II
Region	Certification	Certified units/sales
Germany (BVMI)	Platinum	500,000^{^}
Netherlands (NVPI)	Gold	50,000^{^}
Switzerland (IFPI Switzerland)	Platinum	50,000^{^}
^{^} Shipments figures based on certification alone.

== Miami Vice III ==
Miami Vice III

Soundtrack album by various artists
- Released: October 1988
- Genres: Pop rock; synth-pop
- Label: MCA
- Producers: Babyface; Eric Bazilian; Rick Chertoff; Bob Crewe; Jan Hammer; Don Henley; Rob Hyman; Danny Kortchmar; Greg Ladanyi; L.A. Reid; Stray Cats; Yello

No.	Title	Writer(s)	Producer(s)	Length
1.	"Follow My Rainbow" (performed by Sheena Easton)	Babyface	L.A. Reid; Babyface	4:52
2.	"Satellite" (performed by The Hooters)	Rob Hyman; Eric Bazilian; Rick Chertoff	Chertoff; Hyman; Bazilian	4:12
3.	"Looking for Someone to Love" (performed by the Stray Cats)	Norman Petty; Buddy Holly	Stray Cats	1:50
4.	"Moon on Ice" (performed by Yello)	Boris Blank; Dieter Meier; Billy Mackenzie	Yello	4:13
5.	"New York Theme" (performed by Jan Hammer)	Hammer	Hammer	3:42
6.	"Dirty Laundry" (performed by Don Henley)	Henley; Danny Kortchmar	Henley; Kortchmar; Greg Ladanyi	5:34
7.	"I Got You (I Feel Good)" (performed by James Brown)	Brown	Brown	2:44
8.	"Devil with a Blue Dress On/Good Golly Miss Molly" (Medley) (performed by Mitch Ryder and The Detroit Wheels)	William Stevenson; Frederick Long; John Marascalco; Robert Blackwell	Bob Crewe	3:03
9.	"Call It Love" (performed by Yello)	Blank; Meier; Mackenzie	Yello	5:04
10.	"The Wedding" (performed by Jan Hammer)	Hammer	Hammer	3:22

=== Charts ===
Chart performance for Miami Vice III
Chart (1988)	Peak position
Austrian Albums (Ö3 Austria)	25
European Albums (Music & Media)	79
German Albums (Offizielle Top 100)	32

== The Best of Miami Vice (1989) ==
The Best of Miami Vice

Soundtrack album by various artists
- Released: 1989
- Length: 64:50
- Label: MCA
- Producers: Babyface; Eric Bazilian; Allan Blazek; Jackson Browne; Rick Chertoff; Phil Collins; Rhett Davies; Glenn Frey; Melvin Glover; Jay Graydon; Jan Hammer; Rupert Hine; Rob Hyman; Hugh Padgham; L.A. Reid; Leland Robinson; Roxy Music

No.	Title	Writer(s)	Producer(s)	Length
1.	"The Original Miami Vice Theme" (Instrumental) (performed by Jan Hammer)	Hammer	Hammer	1:00
2.	"Better Be Good to Me" (performed by Tina Turner)	Mike Chapman; Nicky Chinn; Holly Knight	Rupert Hine	5:12
3.	"In the Air Tonight" (performed by Phil Collins)	Collins	Collins	5:29
4.	"Smuggler's Blues" (performed by Glenn Frey)	Frey; Jack Tempchin	Frey; Allan Blazek	3:45
5.	"The Last Unbroken Heart" (performed by Patti LaBelle and Bill Champlin)	Paul Gordon; Joseph Williams; Jay Gruska	Jay Graydon	3:53
6.	"One Way Out" (Instrumental) (performed by Jan Hammer)	Hammer	Hammer	4:15
7.	"Satellite" (performed by The Hooters)	Rob Hyman; Eric Bazilian; Rick Chertoff	Chertoff; Hyman; Bazilian	4:12
8.	"Vice" (performed by Grandmaster Melle Mel)	Melvin Glover; Leland Robinson; Sylvia Robinson	Glover; L. Robinson	5:00
9.	"Crockett's Theme" (performed by Jan Hammer)	Hammer	Hammer	3:25
10.	"Take Me Home" (performed by Phil Collins)	Collins	Collins; Hugh Padgham	5:51
11.	"Heartbeat" (performed by Don Johnson)	Eric Kaz; Wendy Waldman	Chas Sandford	4:21
12.	"You Belong to the City" (performed by Glenn Frey)	Frey; Tempchin	Frey	5:30
13.	"Lives in the Balance" (performed by Jackson Browne)	Browne	Browne	4:13
14.	"Lover" (performed by Roxy Music)	Bryan Ferry; Phil Manzanera	Roxy Music; Rhett Davies	3:52
15.	"Follow My Rainbow" (performed by Sheena Easton)	Babyface	L.A. Reid; Babyface	4:52

=== Charts ===
Chart performance for The Best of Miami Vice (1989)
Chart (1990)	Peak position
German Albums (Offizielle Top 100)	27

== Miami Vice: The Complete Collection ==
Miami Vice: The Complete Collection

Soundtrack album by Jan Hammer
- Released: April 23, 2002
- Genre: Electronic
- Length: 131:46
- Label: One Way
- Producer: Jan Hammer

In 2002, after extensive pressure from fans of the show, Jan Hammer finally released a more comprehensive collection of the score music he wrote for Miami Vice. While the first disc contained music that had already been released on previous soundtracks (namely the three Miami Vice albums and Hammer's own album, Escape from Television), the second CD featured cues that had never previously been released in any format. However, the album was released in only limited numbers and today copies can sell for over $100. The album can be downloaded in its entirety, along with a bonus track, from Hammer's official website.

All tracks are written by Jan Hammer.

Disc one
No.	Title	Length
1.	"Original Miami Vice Theme"	1:00
2.	"Crockett's Theme"	3:32
3.	"New York Theme"	2:59
4.	"Tubbs and Valerie"	3:32
5.	"Evan"	3:06
6.	"Rum Cay"	3:03
7.	"One Way Out"	4:15
8.	"Flashback"	3:19
9.	"Chase"	2:39
10.	"Theresa"	3:07
11.	"Colombia"	2:39
12.	"Marina"	3:41
13.	"Last Flight"	3:30
14.	"Night Talk"	2:44
15.	"Payback"	3:45
16.	"Poem"	3:05
17.	"Rico's Blues"	2:54
18.	"The Trial and the Search"	4:55
19.	"Wedding"	3:23
20.	"Miami Vice Theme"	2:26

Disc two
No.	Title	Length
1.	"Candy"	3:03
2.	"Voodoo Dance"	3:48
3.	"Lombard Trial"	2:35
4.	"Boat Party"	3:06
5.	"Angelina Flashback"	3:26
6.	"Rain"	2:33
7.	"Clues"	3:53
8.	"Crockett's Return"	3:23
9.	"Shadow in the Dark"	3:08
10.	"Incoming"	2:06
11.	"The Talk"	5:11
12.	"Gina"	3:01
13.	"Stone's War"	2:02
14.	"El Viejo Mix"	3:05
15.	"Airport Swap"	2:20
16.	"Russian Story"	4:13
17.	"Cool Runnin'"	2:35
18.	"Texas Ranger"	2:21
19.	"The Great Boat Race"	2:52
20.	"Golden Triangle"	2:47
21.	"Runaround"	3:22
22.	"Turning Point"	1:25

== The Best of Miami Vice (2006) ==
The Best of Miami Vice

Soundtrack album by various artists
- Released: July 4, 2006
- Genres: Electronic; rock
- Length: 55:18
- Labels: Hip-O; UMe
- Producers: Allan Blazek; Jackson Browne; Glenn Frey; Jan Hammer; Mick Jones; Neil Kernon; Terry Manning; Keith Olsen; Richard Perry; Prince; Bob Rose; Alex Sadkin

Professional ratings
Review scores
Source	Rating
AllMusic	3.5/5 stars

No.	Title	Writer(s)	Producer(s)	Length
1.	"Miami Vice Theme" (performed by Jan Hammer)	Hammer	Hammer	2:27
2.	"You Belong to the City" (performed by Glenn Frey)	Frey; Jack Tempchin	Frey	5:52
3.	"Hit Me with Your Best Shot" (performed by Pat Benatar)	Edward Schwartz	Keith Olsen	2:52
4.	"Bad to the Bone" (performed by George Thorogood and The Destroyers)	Thorogood	Terry Manning	4:50
5.	"Better Be Good to Me" (performed by Tina Turner)	Holly Knight; Nicholas Barry Chinn; Mike Chapman	Rupert Hine	5:10
6.	"I'm So Excited" (performed by The Pointer Sisters)	Anita Pointer; June Pointer; Ruth Pointer; Trevor Lawrence	Richard Perry	3:54
7.	"Mercy (Where Is the Love I Lost)" (performed by Steve Jones)	Jones	Bob Rose	4:29
8.	"Crockett's Theme" (performed by Jan Hammer)	Hammer	Hammer	3:26
9.	"Smuggler's Blues" (performed by Glenn Frey)	Frey; Tempchin	Frey; Allan Blazek	3:50
10.	"The Glamorous Life" (performed by Sheila E.)	Sheila E.	Prince	3:42
11.	"I Want to Know What Love Is" (performed by Foreigner)	Mick Jones	Alex Sadkin; Jones	5:00
12.	"Lives in the Balance" (performed by Jackson Browne)	Browne	Browne	4:15
13.	"Turn Up the Radio" (performed by Autograph)	Steve Plunkett; Randy Rand; Steven Isham; Steve Lynch; Keni Richards	Neil Kernon	4:36
14.	"The Original Miami Vice Theme" (performed by Jan Hammer)	Hammer	Hammer	1:02

=== Charts ===
Chart performance for The Best of Miami Vice (2006)
Chart (2006)	Peak position
US Soundtrack Albums (Billboard)	12
