= Escape from Television =

Compilation album by Jan Hammer
- Released: 1987
- Label: MCA
- Producer: Jan Hammer

Jan Hammer chronology
The Early Years (1986)	Escape from Television (1987)	Snapshots (1989)

Escape from Television is a compilation album by Czech-American musician Jan Hammer, released in 1987 by MCA Records.

== Content ==
The album contains selected instrumental pieces composed and performed by Hammer that had been used as film score in the American television series Miami Vice prior to the album's release, along with the main theme to the series, plus one of Hammer's tracks that was not used in the series ("Before the Storm").

== Singles ==
"Miami Vice Theme" had been released as a single in 1985, becoming a worldwide hit, including reaching number one on the US Billboard Hot 100. Three other tracks were released as singles: "Crockett's Theme", which also became a worldwide hit in 1987, "Tubbs and Valerie", which reached number 84 in the UK Singles Chart and number 34 in Germany that year, and "Forever Tonight", which reached number 62 in Germany and number 74 in the Netherlands.

== Critical reception ==
Professional ratings
Review scores
Source	Rating
AllMusic	4/5 stars

In a review for AllMusic, the album was given four out of five stars, being described as containing "a very strong style of [then] current instrumental music [...] with the edge of rock music and the smooth, spacey appeal of some of the more progressive New Age musicians."

== Track listing ==
All tracks written by Jan Hammer.

No.	Title	Length
1.	"Crockett's Theme"	3:32
2.	"Theresa"	3:07
3.	"Colombia"	2:39
4.	"Rum Cay"	3:05
5.	"The Trial and the Search"	4:55
6.	"Tubbs and Valerie"	3:33
7.	"Forever Tonight"	4:01
8.	"Last Flight"	3:31
9.	"Rico's Blues"	2:54
10.	"Before the Storm"	4:32
11.	"Night Talk"	2:45
12.	"Miami Vice Theme"	2:29

CD bonus track
No.	Title	Length
13.	"Forever Tonight" (Extended CD Mix)	6:08

== Personnel ==
Adapted from the album's liner notes.

- Produced and engineered by Jan Hammer
- Recorded and mixed at Red Gate Studio, Kent, New York
- Mastered by Bob Ludwig at Masterdisk, New York
- Track 13 remixed by François Kevorkian
- Artwork: The Complete Works
- Liner notes: Arthur Levy
- Photography: Chris Callis

== Charts ==
Chart (1987)	Peak position
Dutch Albums (Album Top 100)	22
German Albums (Offizielle Top 100)	14
UK Albums (OCC)	34

== Certifications ==
Region	Certification	Certified units/sales
Germany (BVMI)	Gold	250,000^{^}
United Kingdom (BPI)	Gold	100,000^{^}
^{^} Shipments figures based on certification alone.
