= There & Back (Jeff Beck album) =

Studio album by Jeff Beck
- Released: 4 July 1980
- Recorded: London
- Genres: Jazz fusion; instrumental rock
- Length: 35:39
- Label: Epic
- Producers: Jeff Beck, Ken Scott

Jeff Beck chronology
Jeff Beck with the Jan Hammer Group Live (1977)	There & Back (1980)	Flash (1985)

Singles from There & Back
- 1. "The Final Peace" / "Too Much To Lose" Released: 1980

Professional ratings
Review scores
Source	Rating
AllMusic	3/5 stars
The Encyclopedia of Popular Music	2/5 stars
MusicHound Rock: The Essential Album Guide	3.5/5 stars
The Rolling Stone Album Guide	2.5/5 stars

There & Back is the third studio solo album by guitarist Jeff Beck, released in July 1980 through Epic Records. The album reached No. 10 and 21 on the U.S. Billboard Jazz Albums and Billboard 200 charts respectively, and No. 36 on the Swedish albums chart.

The album showcases Beck's stylistic shift towards instrumental rock whilst largely retaining the jazz fusion elements of his two previous releases, Blow by Blow (1975) and Wired (1976). "Star Cycle" was used for a number of years as the theme song for both Mid-South Wrestling in the United States and the British music programme The Tube; "The Pump" was featured in the 1983 film Risky Business; "Too Much to Lose" is an instrumental cover of a song composed by keyboardist Jan Hammer that was originally featured on the Jan Hammer Group's 1977 album Melodies.

== Track listing ==
Side one
No.	Title	Music	Length
1.	"Star Cycle"	Jan Hammer	4:59
2.	"Too Much to Lose"	Hammer	2:59
3.	"You Never Know"	Hammer	4:03
4.	"The Pump"	Tony Hymas, Simon Phillips	5:50
Total length:			17:36

Side two
No.	Title	Music	Length
5.	"El Becko"	Hymas, Phillips	4:01
6.	"The Golden Road"	Hymas, Phillips	4:58
7.	"Space Boogie"	Hymas, Phillips	5:10
8.	"The Final Peace"	Jeff Beck, Hymas	3:38
Total length:			17:40

== Personnel ==
- Jeff Beck – guitar, producer
- Jan Hammer – keyboards, bass (tracks 1–3), drums (track 1)
- Tony Hymas – keyboards (tracks 4–8)
- Simon Phillips – drums (tracks 2–7)
- Mo Foster – bass (tracks 4–7)

Technical

- Ken Scott – producer

== Charts ==
Chart (1980)	Peak position
Australian Albums (Kent Music Report)	95
Canada Top Albums/CDs (RPM)	34
Japanese Albums (Oricon)	15
Swedish Albums (Sverigetopplistan)	36
UK Albums (Official Charts)	38
US Billboard 200	21
US Top Jazz Albums (Billboard)	10
