= Timeless (John Abercrombie album) =

Studio album by John Abercrombie
- Released: 1975
- Recorded: June 21–22, 1974
- Studio: Generation Sound; New York City
- Genre: Jazz fusion
- Length: 43:34
- Label: ECM 1047 ST
- Producer: Manfred Eicher

John Abercrombie chronology
Timeless (1975)	Gateway (1976)

Timeless is the debut album by American jazz guitarist John Abercrombie, recorded over two days in June 1974 and released on ECM Records the following year. The album features a trio with Abercrombie alongside organist Jan Hammer and drummer Jack DeJohnette.

The ECM website praises the album by remarking that "This evergreen stands tall in the ECM forest. There is no sense of competition, only mutual reveling in a distinctly nuclear sound. One could easily call it fusion, but if anything it is fused with itself, for it has created every element it seeks to combine. Timeless indeed."

== Reception ==
Professional ratings
Review scores
Source	Rating
AllMusic	4.5/5 stars
The Penguin Guide to Jazz	4/4 stars
The Rolling Stone Jazz Record Guide	4/5 stars

The AllMusic review by Scott Yanow called the album "thought-provoking and occasionally exciting music that generally defies categorization."

The Penguin Guide to Jazz noted, "There's more filigree than flash on the early Timeless and it's left to DeJohnette and the underrated Hammer to give the set the propulsion it calls for... this is a session that has grown in stature with familiarity, an altogether tougher and more resilient label debut than anyone remembers."

The Rolling Stone Jazz Record Guide said, "Hammer especially plays with astounding fire and grace on this session, some of the finest organ playing he's recorded."

== Track listing ==
All tracks are written by John Abercrombie except where noted.

No.	Title	Writer(s)	Length
1.	"Lungs"	Jan Hammer	12:10
2.	"Love Song"		4:35
3.	"Ralph's Piano Waltz"		4:55
4.	"Red and Orange"	Hammer	5:24
5.	"Remembering"		4:33
6.	"Timeless"		11:57

== Personnel ==
- John Abercrombie – guitar
- Jan Hammer – organ, piano, synthesizer
- Jack DeJohnette – drums
