= Freeman string symphonizer =

The Freeman String Symphonizer was a 5-octave string synthesizer of the 1970s. (The first prototype was shown prior to 1970, but the most well known was shown in 1970, the second according to a Sound on Sound article.) It was finally manufactured by the Chicago Musical Instrument Co. and was also known as the Cordovox CSS. Its sound was related to that of the ARP String Ensemble – cool, glassy-sounding strings. Eventually, its inventor Ken Freeman tried to strike a deal with the company Ling but they abandoned their interest in it. Lowrey, a division of CMI, finally struck a deal after some deliberation.

The delay in getting the Freeman to market limited its sales. Some users were fairly famous, but its release was overshadowed by both the Eminent Solina and Crumar Stringman, both of which had only one oscillator and were cheaper to make.

The Freeman had 25 oscillators. One controlled a 'top octave synthesizer' (TOS) IC (the common MK50240 in later versions; M087 or SAA1004 in earlier ones). The MK50240 TOS contained a set of 12 frequency dividers which derived a 'top octave' of notes from one 2MHz input signal. The other 24 oscillators were assigned two to each of the 12 notes. Thus there were 3 separate pitch references for each note. Each pitch was slightly different, thus creating an analog chorus as the tones of 2 out of 3 gradually drifted a tiny amount to give a dynamic beat frequency between them, much like acoustic instruments gradually change in pitch ever so slightly due to temperature changes.

Each top-octave note was fed to a simple digital counter IC, which divided by 2, 4, 8, 16, and so on, generating all the lower octaves of that note. So the Freeman had three complete sets of tones that could be mixed to create more or fewer overtones in the sound, as one rank was tuned an octave below the other from the beginning. The 'High' and 'Low' buttons on the front panel selected which group was selected, or both could be mixed for a thicker octave overtone on each note. The 'Low' needed be on to hear anything on the highest octave because there were not enough frequency divisions to layer the two across the whole 61-key keyboard.

Because all tones are present all the time, it had no restrictions on how many notes could be played at once, unlike most synthesizers at the time, which were often monophonic. (Aside from the duophonic ARP Odyssey for instance.)

The Ensemble effect invoked the TOS rank to add the additional thickness to the other two 'ranks' of oscillators. The two that had one discrete oscillator per note had an 'animation amount' slider associated with them. 6 low-frequency oscillators were grouped to notes such that it maximizes the effect for typical chords. This made it sound like there were many different vibrato rates, in order to simulate an actual symphony. A built-in spring reverb helped simulate an acoustic environment.

There was a 'touch' (delayed) vibrato setting, and a 'glide' switch on the foot volume pedal (found also on many Lowrey home organs), which dropped the pitch one-half step. This made it unique compared to other string machines that had only one oscillator and relied on delay line chips to produce the ensemble effect (chips that have to reduce the audio bandwidth to mask the digital clocking).

It was a heavy machine - about 70 lbs - and was rather durable except for the removable keyboard cover which looked like it hinged up, but rather pulled straight out.

It was used by The Who, Jan Hammer, Chick Corea, Elton John, Ramsey Lewis, Peter Sinfield, Peter Bardens of Camel and John Philip Shenale on "Reindeer King" from Native Invader by Tori Amos.

Recently, it has been emulated in software by GForce, with their Virtual String Machine software.
