= Crockett's Theme =

1986 single by Jan Hammer

Single by Jan Hammer

from the album Miami Vice II Soundtrack
- B-side: "Miami Vice: New York Theme"
- Released: 1986
- Length: 3:33
- Label: MCA
- Songwriter: Jan Hammer
- Producer: Jan Hammer

Jan Hammer singles chronology
"Miami Vice Theme" (1985)	"Crockett's Theme" (1986)	"Tubbs and Valerie" (1987)

"Crockett's Theme" is an instrumental song composed by Jan Hammer for the hit NBC television series Miami Vice. The surname Crockett refers to Don Johnson's character, James "Sonny" Crockett. The initial version of the theme first appeared in the episode "Calderone's Return: Part 1 – The Hit List", which aired on October 19, 1984, and other variations were used in later episodes. The first commercial release was a version on the late 1986 album Miami Vice II, the second volume of music from the television show. A slightly different mix was released for the single in 1987, and also appeared on Jan Hammer's 1987 album Escape from Television.

== Chart performance ==
The song was a hit in western Europe, reaching number one in Belgium and the Netherlands, for two and four weeks respectively. It peaked at number two in both Ireland and the United Kingdom.

=== Weekly charts ===
Weekly chart performance for "Crockett's Theme"
Chart (1987)	Peak position
Austria (Ö3 Austria Top 40)	29
Belgium (Ultratop 50 Flanders)	1
Europe (European Hot 100 Singles)	22
Ireland (IRMA)	2
Netherlands (Dutch Top 40)	1
Netherlands (Single Top 100)	1
Switzerland (Schweizer Hitparade)	9
UK Singles (Official Charts)	2
US Adult Contemporary (Billboard)	42
West Germany (GfK)	4

=== Year-end charts ===
Year-end chart performance for "Crockett's Theme"
Chart (1987)	Position
Belgium (Ultratop)	4
Europe (European Hot 100 Singles)	26
Netherlands (Dutch Top 40)	2
Netherlands (Single Top 100)	2
UK Singles (OCC)	33
West Germany (Media Control)	8

== Sales and certifications ==
Certifications for "Crockett's Theme"
Region	Certification	Certified units/sales
Netherlands (NVPI)	Platinum	100,000^{^}
United Kingdom (BPI)	Silver	250,000^{^}
^{^} Shipments figures based on certification alone.

== Later uses ==
Between 1991 and 1994, the song was featured in a series of adverts for NatWest in the United Kingdom. It was subsequently re-released as a single in May 1991 in the United Kingdom as an A-side and B-side with Hammer's theme tune for Chancer. It reached number 47 in the UK Singles Chart.

The song was covered by British band The French in a BBC Radio 1 Maida Vale session for John Peel in 2004, and a re-recorded version was released by Darren Hayman and the Audio Antihero label in September 2026.
