= Wired (Jeff Beck album) =

Studio album by Jeff Beck
- Released: May 1976
- Studios: AIR (London); Trident (London); Cherokee (Hollywood)
- Genres: Jazz fusion, funk, instrumental rock
- Length: 36:51
- Label: Epic
- Producers: George Martin, Chris Bond, Jan Hammer

Jeff Beck chronology
Blow by Blow (1975)	Wired (1976)	Jeff Beck with the Jan Hammer Group Live (1977)

Wired is the second solo album by the British guitarist Jeff Beck, released on Epic Records in 1976. An instrumental album, it peaked at No. 16 on the Billboard 200 and was certified platinum by the RIAA.

== Background and content ==
Of the album tracks, four are originals by Narada Michael Walden and one by Jan Hammer. According to popular belief Max Middleton contributed the homage to Led Zeppelin, "Led Boots", however the keyboardist said it had nothing to do with Led Zeppelin. Jeff Beck chose to interpret the Charles Mingus ode to saxophonist Lester Young, "Goodbye Pork Pie Hat", from the classic 1959 jazz album Mingus Ah Um. These last two tracks were long-time staples of Beck's performance repertoire.

== Reception ==
Professional ratings
Review scores
Source	Rating
AllMusic	4.5/5 stars
Christgau's Record Guide	B−
PopMatters	(positive)
The Rolling Stone Record Guide	2/5 stars

Wired received mostly positive reviews when it was released. In Rolling Stone, the reviewer cited it as being full of "fire and imagination". However, Robert Christgau faulted it as technically proficient but soulless, calling it "mindless trickery". Engineer Peter Henderson later said of the album, "I listened to that a few years later and it sounded like it had been recorded direct to cassette. I don't think it was one of my finer moments."

Writing for AllMusic, Mark Kirschenmann said, "Within a two-year span, the twin towers Blow by Blow and Wired set a standard for instrumental rock that even Beck has found difficult to match. On Wired, with first-rate material and collaborators on hand, one of rock's most compelling guitarists is in top form."

The album peaked at No. 16 on the Billboard 200 in August 1976, spending a total of 25 weeks on the chart. In the UK it spent five weeks on the chart and reached No. 35. The album has been certified platinum by the RIAA.

== Release history ==
In addition to the conventional two channel stereo version, the album was also released by Epic in 1976 in a four channel quadraphonic edition on LP record and 8-track tape. The quad LP release was encoded in the SQ matrix system.

The album was first released on CD in 1985 in Japan. In 2001, a remastered stereo edition of the CD was reissued internationally.

The album was reissued in stereo in the United States on the hybrid Super Audio CD format in 2016 by Analogue Productions. The same year it was also reissued by Epic in Japan as a hybrid multichannel SACD. The Japanese SACD version has the entire stereo album, but also adds the complete quad album on the same disc adapted for 5.1 surround sound. This marks the first time that the quad version has been reissued in a digital format.

== Track listing ==
Side one
No.	Title	Writer(s)	Length
1.	"Led Boots"	Max Middleton	3:59
2.	"Come Dancing"	Narada Michael Walden	5:54
3.	"Goodbye Pork Pie Hat"	Charles Mingus	5:26
4.	"Head for Backstage Pass"	Wilbur Bascomb, Andy Clark	2:42*
Total length:			18:31

Side two
No.	Title	Writer(s)	Length
1.	"Blue Wind"	Jan Hammer	5:49
2.	"Sophie"	Narada Michael Walden	6:27
3.	"Play with Me"	Narada Michael Walden	4:06
4.	"Love Is Green"	Narada Michael Walden	2:28
Total length:			19:19

* Note: "Head for Backstage Pass" is incorrectly listed as being 3:45 on some LP centres; 2:42 is correct.

== Personnel ==
- Jeff Beck – guitars
- Max Middleton – Hohner clavinet (except on "Blue Wind" and "Love Is Green"), Fender Rhodes electric piano (on "Sophie")
- Jan Hammer – synthesizer (on "Led Boots", "Come Dancing", "Blue Wind", "Sophie" [uncredited] and "Play with Me"), drums and keyboard bass (on "Blue Wind")
- Wilbur Bascomb – bass (except on "Blue Wind")
- Narada Michael Walden – drums (on "Led Boots", "Come Dancing", "Sophie" and "Play with Me"), piano (on "Love Is Green")
- Richard Bailey – drums (on "Goodbye Pork Pie Hat" and "Head for Backstage Pass")
- Ed Greene – second drum kit (on "Come Dancing")

=== Additional personnel ===
- George Martin – producer
- Chris Bond – assistant producer
- Jan Hammer – producer on "Blue Wind"
- Pete Henderson, Dennis McKay, John Mills, John Arias – engineers
- Geoff Emerick – mixing engineer
- Bruce Dickinson – reissue producer

== Charts ==
Chart (1976)	Peak position
Australian Albums (Kent Music Report)	17
Canada Top Albums/CDs (RPM)	14
Japanese Albums (Oricon)	7
UK Albums (Official Charts)	38
US Billboard 200	16

== Certifications ==
Region	Certification	Certified units/sales
Canada (Music Canada)	Gold	50,000^{^}
United States (RIAA)	Platinum	1,000,000^{^}
^{^} Shipments figures based on certification alone.

== Bibliography ==
- Costa, Jean Charles (November 1976). "Beck don't look back or progress is obsession". Hit Parader. Vol. 35, no. 148. Derby, CT. pp. 26–27, 60–61. ISSN 0162-0266.
- Hickey, Dave (22 July 1976). "Live 'Wired': The Jeff Beck Interview". Circus. No. 136. New York, NY. pp. 22–25. ISSN 0009-7365.
- Power, Martin (2014). Hot Wired: The Life of Jeff Beck (New & Updated ed.). New York: Omnibus Press. ISBN 9781783055920.
- Rohter, Larry (17 June 1977). "Jeff Beck: The Progression of a True Progressive". DownBeat. Vol. 44, no. 12. Chicago, IL. pp. 13–14, 53. ISSN 0012-5768.
