= Like Children =

Studio album by Jerry Goodman & Jan Hammer
- Released: July 26, 1974
- Recorded: March–April 1974
- Studio: Caribou Ranch (Nederland, CO); Trident Studios (London)
- Genre: Jazz fusion
- Length: 38:18
- Label: Nemperor
- Producer: Jerry Goodman, Jan Hammer

Like Children is an album by Jan Hammer and Jerry Goodman. It was released in 1974 by Nemperor Records. Both musicians were members of the Mahavishnu Orchestra.

== Reception ==
Professional ratings
Review scores
Source	Rating
AllMusic	4.5/5 stars

In a review for AllMusic, Michael G. Nastos wrote: "'Country and Eastern Music' and 'Steppings Tones' were high-water marks for this new breed (at the time)."

A writer for Billboard called the album "an exceptional first effort," and commented: "It fully shows their influences on the group's sound as they play every instrument on the album. Each of them is an excellent musician and ably displays it."

== Track listing ==
1. "Country and Eastern Music" (Hammer) – 5:36
2. "No Fear" (Hammer) – 3:28
3. "I Remember Me" (Hammer) – 3:48
4. "Earth (Still Our Only Home)" (Hammer) – 4:16
5. "Topeka" (Goodman) – 2:57
6. "Steppings Tones" (Rick Laird) – 3:30
7. "Night" (Hammer, David Earle Johnson) – 5:48
8. "Full Moon Boogie" (Hammer, Goodman) – 4:12
9. "Giving in Gently"/"I Wonder" (Hammer, Ivona Reich, Goodman) – 4:43

== Personnel ==
- Jan Hammer - vocals, keyboards, piano (acoustic and electric), Moog synthesizers (lead and bass), sequencing, drums, percussion
- Jerry Goodman - vocals, rhythm, lead and acoustic guitars, violin (electric and acoustic), mandolin (acoustic and electric), viola
