= Miami Vice Theme =

- Japanese release cover

Single by Jan Hammer

from the album Miami Vice soundtrack
- B-side: "Eyes"; "The Original Miami Vice Theme"
- Released: August 1985
- Genre: Electronic rock
- Length: 2:26
- Label: MCA
- Songwriter: Jan Hammer
- Producer: Jan Hammer

Jan Hammer singles chronology
"Miami Vice Theme" (1985)	"Crockett's Theme" (1986)

Music video
- "Miami Vice Theme" on YouTube

"Miami Vice Theme" is a musical piece composed and performed by Jan Hammer as the theme to the television series Miami Vice. It was first presented as part of the television broadcast of the show in September 1984, was released as a single in 1985, and peaked at number one on the Billboard Hot 100. It was the last instrumental to top the Hot 100 until 2013, when "Harlem Shake" by Baauer reached number one. "Miami Vice Theme" also peaked at number five in the UK and number four in Canada. In 1986, it won Grammy Awards for "Best Instrumental Composition" and "Best Pop Instrumental Performance". This piece, along with Glenn Frey's number two hit "You Belong to the City", put the Miami Vice soundtrack on the top of the US album chart for 11 weeks in 1985, making it the most successful TV soundtrack of all time until 2006, when Disney Channel's High School Musical beat its record.

== Music video ==
The music video of the theme is a mini-episode of the TV series with Hammer as a fugitive on the run from Sonny Crockett and Ricardo Tubbs. Throughout the majority of the video, Hammer performs the theme in front of a projector screen playing footage from the TV series – including scenes of the Vice duo chasing him. In the end of the video, he boards a helicopter and escapes from Crockett's sight. The video also shows shots of Fairlight CMI screens including the page R (sequencer) page and the waveform page.

== Track listing ==
7"
MCA / MCAP1000 (UK picture disc)
(Mastered by Greg Fulginiti)

1. "Miami Vice Theme" – 2:26
2. "Miami Vice Theme" (TV version) – 1:00
3. "Miami Vice Theme" (12" edit) – 4:30

12"
MCA / MCAT1000 (UK)
(Extended Remix and 12" edit done by Louis Silas, Jr.)

1. "Miami Vice Theme" (Extended Remix) – 6:54
2. "Miami Vice Theme" (TV version) – 1:00
3. "Miami Vice Theme" (12" edit) – 4:30

== Charts ==
=== Weekly charts ===
Chart (1985–1987)	Peak position
Australia (Kent Music Report)	14
Austria (Ö3 Austria Top 40)	4
Belgium (Ultratop 50 Flanders)	20
Canada Top Singles (RPM)	3
Canada Adult Contemporary (RPM)	25
Ireland (IRMA)	2
Netherlands (Dutch Top 40)	23
Netherlands (Single Top 100)	22
New Zealand (Recorded Music NZ)	8
Switzerland (Schweizer Hitparade)	8
UK Singles (Official Charts)	5
US Billboard Hot 100	1
US 12-inch Singles Sales (Billboard)	7
US Adult Contemporary (Billboard)	16
US Dance Club Play (Billboard)	23
US Hot Black Singles (Billboard)	10
US Top Rock Tracks (Billboard)	29
US Cash Box Top 100	1
West Germany (GfK)	5

=== Year-end charts ===
Chart (1985)	Position
Canada Top Singles (RPM)	36
UK Singles (OCC)	98
US Billboard Hot 100	27
US Cash Box Top 100	11

Chart (1987)	Position
West Germany (Media Control)	38

== Appearances ==
Miami Vice's pilot episode, made as a two-hour TV movie, did not originally have a theme, but the musical sounds and notation that would become the theme were present as background score. When the series got picked up, Hammer created the 60-second version of the theme. The synth-guitar lead was missing in the aired version of the pilot and the first batch of episodes, and this unfinished version of the theme has remained attached to those episodes, even on the DVD video box set released in 2005.

== See also ==
- List of Billboard Hot 100 number-one singles of 1985
- List of Cash Box Top 100 number-one singles of 1985
