= Jan Hammer =

Czech-American musician (born 1948)

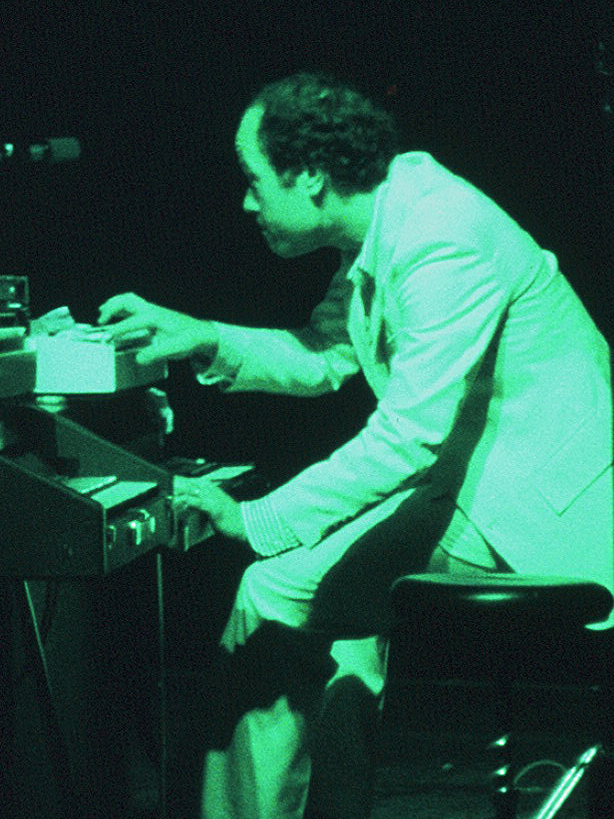
- Jan Hammer in 1977

Background information
- Born: Jan Hammer; 17 April 1948 (age 78); Prague, Czechoslovakia
- Genres: Jazz fusion; synth-pop; pop rock
- Occupations: Musician; composer; record producer
- Instruments: Keyboards; drums; synthesizer; keytar
- Years active: 1968–present
- Website: janhammer.com

Jan Hammer (Czech pronunciation: [ˈjan ˈɦamɛr]) (born 17 April 1948) is a Czech-American musician, composer, and record producer. He rose to prominence while playing keyboards with the Mahavishnu Orchestra during the early 1970s, as well as with his film scores for television and film including "Miami Vice Theme" and "Crockett's Theme", from the 1980s television program Miami Vice. He has continued to work as both a musical performer and producer.

Hammer has collaborated with some of the era's most influential jazz and rock musicians such as John McLaughlin, Jeff Beck, Billy Cobham, Al Di Meola, Mick Jagger, Carlos Santana, Stanley Clarke, Tommy Bolin, Neal Schon, Steve Lukather, John Abercrombie and Elvin Jones. He has composed and produced at least 14 original motion picture soundtracks, the music for 90 episodes of Miami Vice and 20 episodes of the television series Chancer.

His compositions have won him two Grammy Awards.

== Biography ==
=== Early life ===
Jan Hammer was born in Prague, then capital of Czechoslovakia (now the Czech Republic). His mother was Vlasta Průchová, a well-known Czech singer, and his father was a doctor who worked his way through school playing vibraphone and bass guitar. Hammer began playing the piano at the age of four and his formal instruction started two years later. He aspired to follow his father into medicine until a family friend convinced him to develop his musical talents instead.

Hammer formed a jazz trio in high school, performing and recording throughout Eastern Europe at the age of fourteen. Upon entrance to the Prague Academy of Musical Arts, he completed many compulsory classes including harmony, counterpoint, music history, and classical composition. His influences included pianists Erroll Garner, Bill Evans, and Paul Bley, organists Jimmy Smith and Larry Young, and drummers Jo Jones, Philly Joe Jones, Elvin Jones, and Tony Williams.

Hammer's studies at the academy were cut short when the Warsaw Pact invaded Czechoslovakia on 20 August 1968. He recorded a jazz trio live album at "The Domicile" in Munich on 30 August 1968. This was released as Malma Maliny by the German label MPS Records. He stayed in Munich and worked with actress Kai Fischer on her debut album "Kai Fidelity". Hammer decided to move to the United States and resolved to become a citizen after receiving a scholarship at Berklee College of Music in Boston.

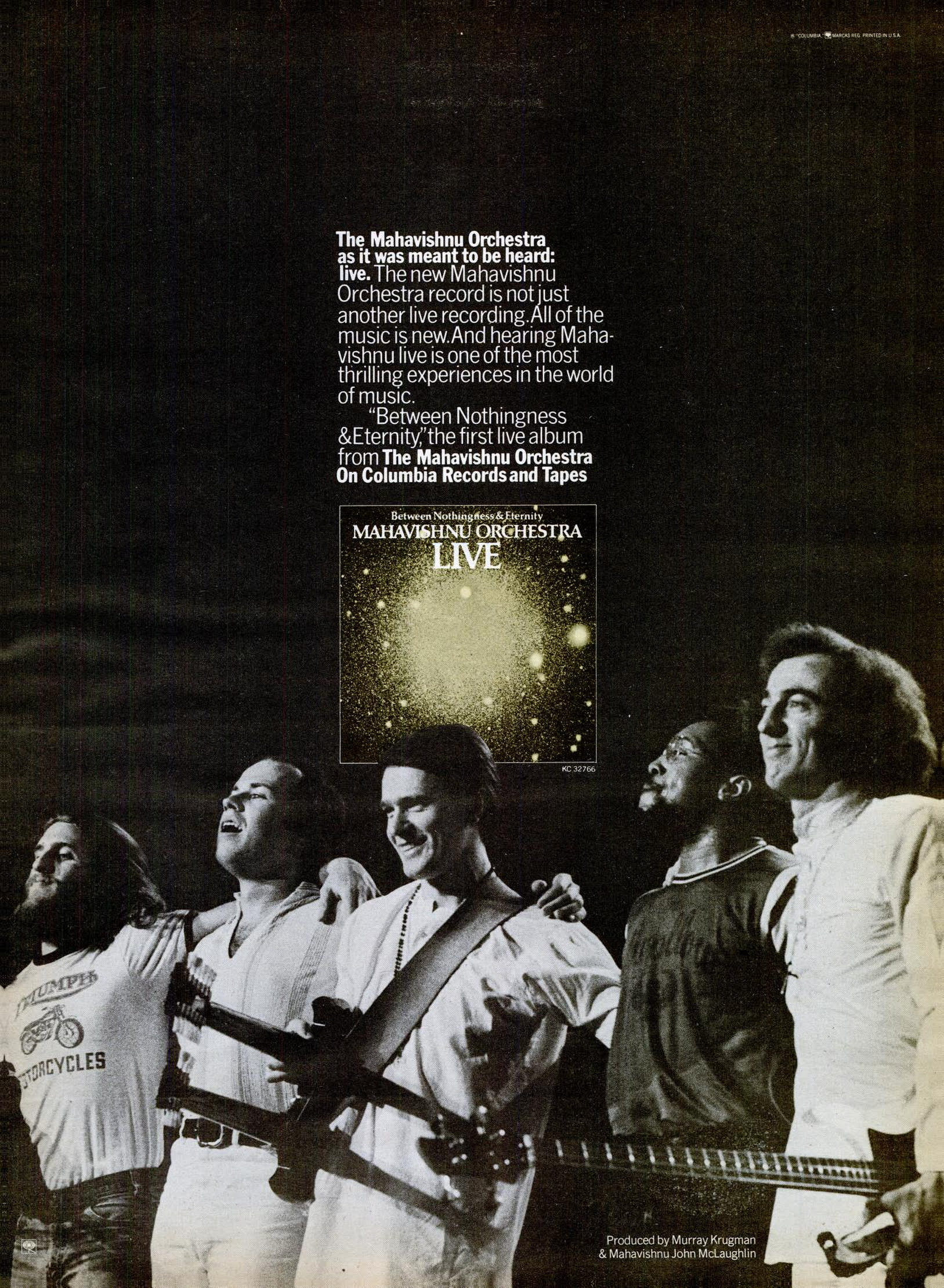
A 1973 advertisement for Between Nothingness and Eternity, featuring Jan Hammer as the second from the left.

Upon completion of his studies, Hammer spent a year touring with Sarah Vaughan, recorded with Elvin Jones and Jeremy Steig, then moved to New York City and joined the original lineup of the Mahavishnu Orchestra with guitarist John McLaughlin, violinist Jerry Goodman, bassist Rick Laird, and drummer Billy Cobham in 1971. A successful jazz fusion band, they performed some 530 shows before their farewell concert on 30 December 1973. Hammer was an early pioneer of playing the Minimoog Moog synthesizer in a live setting.

In 1973, Hammer joined Billy Cobham, Leland Sklar, Tommy Bolin and additional personnel on Billy Cobham's debut solo album, Spectrum. After recording albums with Goodman and John Abercrombie (ECM session Timeless with Jack DeJohnette) in 1974, Hammer's solo career began with the release of The First Seven Days (1975). He produced and recorded the album at Red Gate Studio, which he'd built in his upstate New York farmhouse and which has been the location of his recordings ever since.

In 1976, he featured with jazz/rock guitarist Jeff Beck on Beck's RIAA platinum album Wired, produced by George Martin. A tour featuring songs from Wired and Blow By Blow ensued resulting in the Jeff Beck with the Jan Hammer Group Live album, a chronicle of their 117-show tour which was certified gold.

The Jan Hammer Group was also formed in 1976 and supported The First Seven Days on tour. The group released two LPs Oh, Yeah? and Melodies.

Hammer composed music for the Czech cinematic fairy-tale The Incredibly Sad Princess.

=== Late 1970s and early 1980s ===
In 1977, Hammer recorded Elegant Gypsy with Al Di Meola. Casino, Splendido Hotel and Electric Rendezvous followed. He then joined Di Meola for a tour chronicled the same year on Tour De Force - Live; and finally appeared throughout Scenario, using a Fairlight CMI digital synthesizer and contributing to more than half of the album's compositions.

During the mid 70s to early 80s he also recorded and played with Joni Mitchell, Billy Cobham, Santana, Tommy Bolin, Harvey Mason and Stanley Clarke.

In 1978, Hammer returned to solo work with the release of Black Sheep. He then formed a new band, known as "Hammer". Also in 1978, he wrote and performed on three songs for Jeff Beck's next album, There and Back, which was released in 1980. One of the album tracks, "Star Cycle," became the theme for the British television series The Tube.

He formed Schon & Hammer, a duo with ex Santana and Journey guitarist Neal Schon, that recorded Untold Passion in 1981 and Here to Stay in 1982.

Hammer took the stage with Jeff Beck in December 1983 for the nine U.S. benefit concerts that raised money for Ronnie Lane's A.R.M.S. (Action Research into Multiple Sclerosis), featuring Jimmy Page, Eric Clapton, Joe Cocker and a host of others. Into 1984, his various talents were employed on recordings as diverse as James Young's (Styx) first solo album, City Slicker, for which he co-wrote and produced; John Abercrombie's Night; Mick Jagger's first solo album, She's the Boss; and Jeff Beck's Flash which included Hammer's song "Escape", winner of the 1985 Grammy award for "Best Rock Instrumental Performance".

=== Miami Vice and successes ===
Hammer recorded original scores for three major motion pictures and documentaries, television movies in the U.S., commercials, and station identifications. In the fall of 1984 the producers of Miami Vice enlisted him to commence a weekly schedule of scoring the series.

On 2 November 1985, the Miami Vice Soundtrack hit number one on the Billboard Top Pop album charts. The album achieved quadruple-platinum status with U.S. sales of more than four million copies.

At the Grammy awards in February 1986, "Miami Vice Theme" earned Hammer two awards; one for "Best Pop Instrumental Performance" and one for "Best Instrumental Composition". He also earned Emmy award nominations in 1985 and 1986, for "Outstanding Achievement in Musical Composition". At the end of 1986, Hammer won Keyboard Magazine's poll as "Best Studio Synthesist" for a second consecutive year. He had previously won the "Best Lead Synthesist" honor for seven years, at which time he was inducted into the Keyboard Hall of Fame.

In 1988, Hammer bowed out of full-time musical chores for Miami Vice. The theme song he composed remained in use until the show ended its five-season run in 1989.

The first project to spring from the new Red Gate was Hammer's original soundtrack for Clinton and Nadine for HBO Films.

Hammer's next two assignments contributed greatly to his next album. First, at the end of the summer, he was commissioned to compose and perform a theme entitled "The Runner" for a major series of television advertisements in England that starred Bob Geldof. Second, Hammer composed and performed the theme music for the top-rated new bi-weekly pan-European television series, Eurocops, which premiered in seven countries that November.

Snapshots was the first full album from the new Red Gate studio in 1989, with Hammer composing, performing and producing every track. The promo video for "Too Much to Lose," the album's first European single, featured Jeff Beck, David Gilmour of Pink Floyd, and Ringo Starr.

=== The 1990s ===
In the early 1990s, Hammer toured with drummer Tony Williams. Notably, they featured as Jan Hammer / Tony Williams Group on July 4, 1991, at Spectrum de Montréal (Montreal International Jazz Festival). The show was documented on both DVD and audio CD.

The 1990s saw a renewed focus on scoring, starting with I Come in Peace (a.k.a. Dark Angel, composed in 1989 but released in 1990), Curiosity Kills and all twenty episodes of the British television series, Chancer, several episodes of HBO's Tales from the Crypt; a television spot for Amnesty International, featuring Czech president Václav Havel, two pilots for NBC, Knight Rider 2000 and News at 12, The Taking of Beverly Hills (Columbia Pictures) and New Line Cinema's Sunset Heat.

"Crockett's Theme" was re-released with Hammer's theme tune for Chancer in the UK in 1991, after the former featured in a series of commercials for NatWest.

Hammer's next project was as composer and performer of the original score for the Miramar Productions video album, Beyond the Mind's Eye.

In late 1993, and to 2000, Hammer was commissioned to compose all the original music for TV Nova, the first commercial television network in Eastern Europe, based in his native Czech Republic, which had its launch on February 4, 1994. He composed everything—including themes for 23 original shows produced by the network, 50 separate station ID's, the music for all of the network's special broadcasts, plus the music for all the news, sports and weather programs.

In 1994, Hammer recorded Drive, his first full-fledged album of original new non-soundtrack material under his name in several years. He was reunited with longtime partner Jeff Beck on "Underground", reminiscent of their collaborations of the past.

In 1995, Hammer returned to his scoring and soundtrack work. He began with the one-hour Universal drama Vanishing Son, then went on to compose the theme and score for 13 episodes of the series. He composed and performed the original music for two feature films, both released in 1996: A Modern Affair and In the Kingdom of the Blind the Man with One Eye Is King. Hammer wrapped up the year scoring Beastmaster III: The Eye of Braxus.

In 1996, Hammer's scoring assignments included the NBC Movie of the Week, The Babysitter's Seduction, The Secret Agent Club, and The Corporate Ladder.

In 1997, Hammer also composed the soundtrack for the new CD-ROM game, Outlaw Racers (MegaMedia). His next project was the theme and original music score for the pilot and the series of Prince Street.

In 1999, Hammer wrote, performed and produced a tune, "Even Odds" for Jeff Beck's latest album Who Else! (Epic). Also, 1999 saw the release of The Lost Trident Sessions, the third and last studio album from his former group, the Mahavishnu Orchestra. The album was recorded in 1973 just prior to the band's breakup.

=== 2000 to present ===
Hammer produced the original score for Cocaine Cowboys, a 2006 documentary depicting the infamous Miami drug trade scene of the 1980s. Hammer's soundtrack of the film was released in 2007.

Also in the autumn of 2004 Hammer released the album The Best of Miami Vice on the Reality label in the U.S. The Best of Miami Vice contains newly recorded versions of "Miami Vice Theme" and "Crockett's Theme", as well as one bonus track never before released on CD.

In February 2005, Universal Studios Home Entertainment released the first season of Miami Vice on three double-sided DVDs. One of the package's discs contained bonus material, including an extensive interview and archival footage of Hammer creating music for the show back in 1985.

To coincide with the release of the DVD, Reality Records released a newly recorded version of "Crockett's Theme" to AC (Adult Contemporary) radio in America.

In 2006, Hammer was asked to collaborate with the singer/rapper TQ for a brand new version of his song "Crockett's Theme". The result of their work was The Jan Hammer Project Featuring TQ (Terrance Quaites): Crockett's Theme. A CD single of this new version climbed up the charts in Europe, hitting No. 1 on the iTunes Europe download list.

In a 2012 interview, Hammer indicated that he is working on a compilation of unreleased works.

In a 2014 interview with the Rolling Stone he claimed he always felt halfway between experimental music and prog-rock. He also claimed to have recorded the theme song for Miami Vice before the series was made, and that it had been the piece he presented to Michael Mann when announcing his interest of being involved with the series. He stated that he used a Fairlight CMI to compose the music to the series while sampling drums and percussion into it with real acoustic sound. He added that he would have been interested in scoring the 2006 film version of Miami Vice, but that he was never approached by Michael Mann about it.

He recorded a version of the Squidbillies theme in 2014.

On 20 July 2018 he released his first album of new material in over 10 years: Seasons – Part 1.

== Personal life ==
Hammer became a US citizen in 1978. He has a son, Paul, who fronts the band Savoir Adore.
