= Herbie Hancock discography =

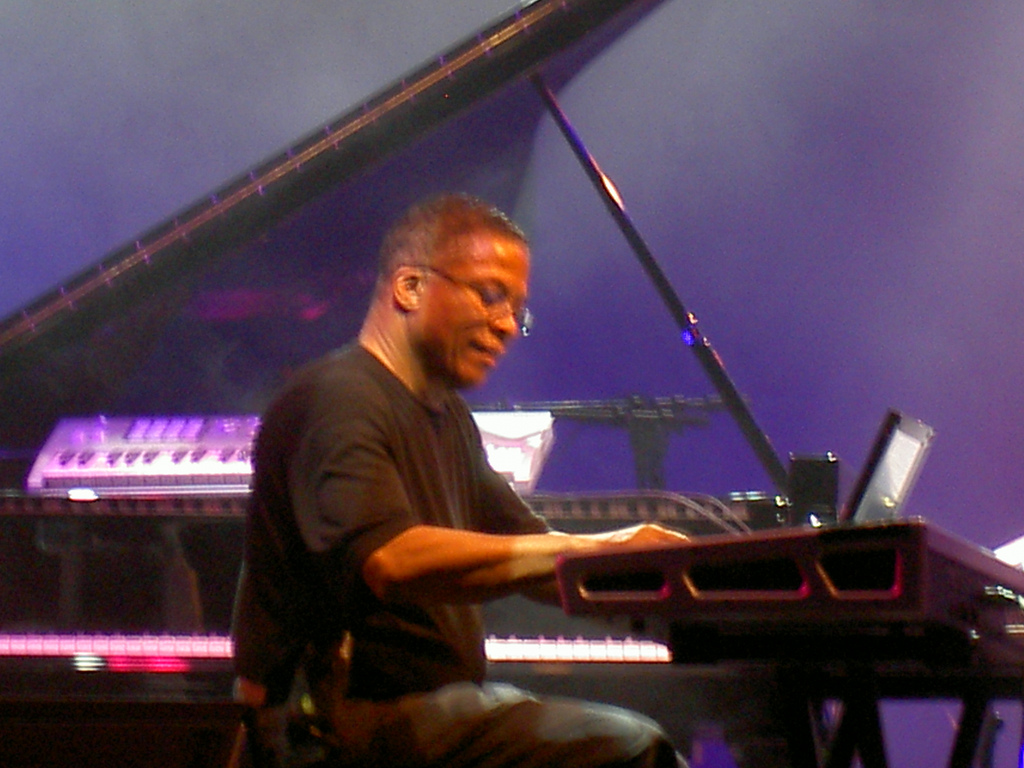
- Hancock performing in concert, 2006
- Studio albums: 41
- Soundtrack albums: 5
- Live albums: 12
- Compilation albums: 62
- Singles: 38

The discography of the American jazz artist Herbie Hancock consists of forty-one studio albums, twelve live albums, sixty-two compilation albums, five soundtrack albums, thirty-eight physical singles, nine promo singles and four songs not released as singles, but that charted due to downloads. This article does not include re-issues, unless they are counted separately from the original works in the charts; furthermore, because of the enormous amount of material published, this discography omits less notable appearances in compilations and live albums. The discography shows the peak weekly main chart positions of eight selected countries: United States, France,^{[a]} Germany, Japan,^{[b]} Netherlands, Sweden,^{[c]} Switzerland and United Kingdom. Positions also listed on United States are R&B / hip hop, dance / club, jazz^{[d]} and bubbling under charts.^{[e]} The peaks do not refer necessarily to the position that a record reached when it was first released. Also included are certifications from the Recording Industry Association of America (RIAA)^{[f]} and the Bundesverband Musikindustrie (BVMI).^{[g]}

Hancock made his debut as professional musician in the early 1960s as a sideman, quickly earning a good reputation. Blue Note Records noticed his talent and added him to its roster. For the label, he released seven albums, including Takin' Off (1962), his first solo album, supported by the single "Watermelon Man", which is one of the most performed jazz standards; Empyrean Isles (1964) and Maiden Voyage (1965), two influential jazz albums. During these years, Hancock also began a career as composer for film and television soundtracks, beginning with Blow-Up (1966) for MGM Records. In this role, he reached the top in 1986 with the Round Midnight soundtrack (for Columbia Records), that had its best result on the AFYVE Spanish Albums Chart at No. 18 and won an Academy Award for Best Original Score. After his departure from Blue Note, Hancock signed with Warner Bros. Records, publishing three albums in which he experimented with new jazz music directions: the R&B-oriented Fat Albert Rotunda (1969) and the electronic-oriented Mwandishi (1971) and Crossings (1972). These three releases became influential in the jazz rock movement.

Hancock continued to experiment after leaving Warner Bros. for Columbia Records, where he remained until the late 1980s, releasing sixteen studio albums. At Columbia, Hancock had his best commercial results, gaining immediate success with Head Hunters (1973), an R&B-oriented jazz album with strong funk influences. It peaked at No. 13 on the Billboard 200 and became the best-selling jazz album for a period of time. In 1986, it became the first jazz album ever to win a RIAA Platinum Award and is considered very influential in jazz, funk, soul and hip-hop music. Head Hunters also contains Hancock's first mainstream hit, "Chameleon" (1974), which peaked at No. 35 on the RPM Canadian Singles Chart and is a jazz standard. Other albums that followed in the style of Head Hunters with good popular success, especially in the US, were Thrust (1974) and Man-Child (1975), which ranked respectively No. 13 and No. 21 on the Billboard 200. In 1978, Hancock added disco influences to his jazz and established himself as a mainstream hitmaker across Europe with "I Thought It Was You" (1978) and "You Bet Your Love" (1979), which peaked, respectively, at No. 15 and No. 18 on the UK Singles Chart, and "Tell Everybody" (1979), which peaked at No. 22 on the Belgian Flemish Singles Chart. Thanks to these singles, his albums Sunlight (1978) and Feets, Don't Fail Me Now (1979) earned good popular success, especially in Europe. The first album had its best performance peaking on UK Albums Chart at No. 26, and the second peaked on the VG Norwegian Albums Chart at No. 18.

In 1983, Hancock radically refreshed his sound with strong electronic influences and released Future Shock (1983), an influential album in jazz fusion, dance, electronic, techno and hip-hop music. The album had its best results in Europe, where it peaked at No. 7 on the Ö3 Austria Top 75 Longplays chart. Furthermore, it spawned his biggest hit single, "Rockit" (1983), the first jazz hip-hop song, and became a worldwide anthem for breakdancers and the hip-hop culture of the 1980s. It reached the top 10 in several countries (especially in Europe), having its best performance on Swiss Singles Chart and Belgian Flemish Singles Chart, in each case at No. 4. It also won a RIAA Gold Award in 1990. Thanks to this song, Hancock won the Grammy Award for Best R&B Instrumental Performance, the first Grammy of his career of a total of fourteen. Future Shock was a bigger success than even Head Hunters, winning a RIAA Platinum Award in 1994 faster than the earlier album had. It spawned an additional mainstream hit with "Autodrive" (1983), which had its best performance on UK Singles Chart, peaking at No. 33. Sound-System (1984) followed the musical direction of Future Shock and won the Grammy Award in the same category of "Rockit", making Hancock the first solo artist to win in this category for two consecutive years and also the artist with most wins in the category (a record shared with Earth, Wind & Fire and George Benson). After six years of silence in his solo career, Hancock signed with Mercury Records and released Dis Is da Drum (1994) that showed another innovation in his career with an acid jazz-oriented sound and reached No. 40 on the Swedish Albums Chart. After this release, there were several albums of duets, covers and tributes, such as Gershwin's World (1998), Possibilities (2005) and River: The Joni Letters (2007). The last peaked at No. 5 on the Billboard 200 and became the second jazz album in history to win a Grammy Award for Album of the Year (the first was Getz/Gilberto (1964) by Stan Getz and João Gilberto). As of 2016, Hancock's last original solo project was the electronic-influenced Future 2 Future (2001), released for Transparent Music.

== Albums ==
=== Studio albums ===
List of studio albums, with selected chart positions and certifications
Title	Album details	Peak chart positions											Certifications
Title	Album details	US	US R&B	US Jazz (Trad)	US Jazz (Cont)	FRA	GER	JPN	NL	SWE	SWZ	UK	Certifications
Takin' Off	Recorded May 28, 1962; Released 1962; Label: Blue Note; Format: CD, Download, LP, Tape	—	—	—	—	—	—	286	—	—	—	—	
My Point of View	Recorded March 19, 1963; Released 1963; Label: Blue Note; Format: CD, Download, LP	—	—	—	—	—	—	—	—	—	—	—	
Inventions & Dimensions	Recorded August 30, 1963; Released 1964; Label: Blue Note; Format: CD, Download, LP, Tape	—	—	—	—	—	—	—	—	—	—	—	
Empyrean Isles	Recorded June 17, 1964; Released November 1964; Label: Blue Note; Format: CD, Download, LP, Tape	—	—	—	—	—	67	—	—	—	—	—	
Maiden Voyage	Recorded March 17, 1965; Released 1965; Label: Blue Note; Format: CD, Download, LP, SACD, Tape	—	—	—	—	—	—	225	—	—	—	—	
Speak Like a Child	Recorded March 6, 1968; Released 1968; Label: Blue Note; Format: CD, Download, LP, Tape	—	—	14	—	—	—	279	—	—	—	—	
The Prisoner	Recorded April 1969; Released 1969; Label: Blue Note; Format: CD, Download, LP, Tape	—	—	—	—	—	—	—	—	—	—	—	
Fat Albert Rotunda	Recorded October–December 1969; Released December 1969; Label: Warner Bros.; Format: CD, Download, LP	—	—	15	—	—	—	—	—	—	—	—	
Mwandishi	Recorded December 31, 1970; Released 1971; Label: Warner Bros.; Format: CD, Download, LP	—	—	16	—	—	—	—	—	—	—	—	
Crossings	Recorded February 1972; Released May 1972; Label: Warner Bros.; Format: CD, Download, LP	—	—	10	—	—	—	—	—	—	—	—	
Sextant	Recorded 1972; Released March 30, 1973; Label: Columbia; Format: CD, Download, LP, 8-Track	176	—	3	—	—	—	—	—	—	—	—	
Head Hunters	Recorded September 1973; Released October 26, 1973; Label: Columbia; Format: CD, Download, LP, MD, SACD, Tape, 8-Track	13	2	1	—	—	—	86	—	—	—	—	RIAA: Platinum
Dedication	Recorded July 29, 1974; Released September 21, 1974; Label: CBS / Sony; Format: CD, Download, LP	—	—	—	—	—	—	—	—	—	—	—	
Thrust	Recorded August 1974; Released September 6, 1974; Label: Columbia; Format: CD, Download, LP, Tape, 8-Track	13	2	1	—	—	—	—	—	—	—	—	
Man-Child	Released August 22, 1975; Label: Columbia; Format: CD, Download, LP, Tape, 8-Track	21	6	1	—	—	—	—	—	—	—	—	
Secrets	Released August 1976; Label: Columbia; Format: CD, Download, LP, Tape, 8-Track	49	8	1	—	—	—	—	—	—	—	—	
Third Plane (with Ron Carter and Tony Williams)	Recorded July 13, 1977; Released 1977; Label: Milestone; Format: CD, Download, LP, Tape	—	—	40	—	—	—	—	—	—	—	—	
The Herbie Hancock Trio (with Ron Carter and Tony Williams)	Recorded July 13, 1977; Released September 21, 1977; Label: CBS / Sony; Format: CD, Download, LP	—	—	—	—	—	—	82	—	—	—	—	
Sunlight	Recorded 1977; Released June 15, 1978; Label: Columbia; Format: CD, Download, LP, Tape, 8-Track	58	31	3	—	—	—	—	—	—	—	26	
Directstep	Recorded October 1978; Released January 21, 1979; Label: CBS / Sony; Format: CD, Download, LP	—	—	—	—	—	—	—	—	—	—	—	
The Piano	Recorded October 1978; Released June 21, 1979; Label: CBS / Sony; Format: CD, Download, LP	—	—	—	—	—	—	—	—	—	—	—	
Feets, Don't Fail Me Now	Recorded 1978; Released February 1979; Label: Columbia; Format: CD, Download, LP, Tape	38	16	2	—	—	—	—	—	38	—	28	
Monster	Recorded 1979–1980; Released March 1980; Label: Columbia; Format: CD, Download, LP, Tape, 8-Track	94	19	3	—	—	—	—	—	—	—	—	
Mr. Hands	Recorded 1980; Released September 1980; Label: Columbia; Format: CD, Download, LP, Tape	117	46	4	—	—	—	—	—	—	—	—	
Magic Windows	Recorded 1981; Released September 29, 1981; Label: Columbia; Format: CD, Download, LP, Tape	140	40	13	—	—	—	—	—	—	—	—	
Herbie Hancock Trio (with Ron Carter and Tony Williams)	Recorded June 27, 1981; Released October 1982; Label: CBS / Sony; Format: CD, Download	—	—	—	—	—	—	—	—	—	—	—	
Quartet (with Ron Carter, Tony Williams and Wynton Marsalis)	Recorded July 28, 1981; Released 1982; Label: Columbia; Format: CD, Download, LP, Tape	202	—	5	—	—	—	77	—	—	—	—	
Lite Me Up	Recorded 1982; Released August 1, 1982; Label: Columbia; Format: CD, Download, LP, Tape	151	31	10	—	—	—	68	—	—	—	—	
Future Shock	Recorded 1983; Released August 1983; Label: Columbia; Format: CD, Download, LP, SACD, Tape	43	10	2	—	25	22	51	16	19	9	27	RIAA: Platinum
Sound-System	Recorded October–December 1983; Released January 1984; Label: Columbia; Format: CD, Download, LP, Tape	71	34	7	—	—	—	51	—	48	—	—	
Village Life (with Foday Musa Suso)	Recorded August 1984; Released 1985; Label: Columbia; Format: CD, Download, LP, Tape	—	—	—	—	—	—	—	—	—	—	—	
Perfect Machine	Recorded 1988; Released May 1988; Label: Columbia; Format: CD, Download, LP, Tape	—	65	—	—	—	—	—	—	—	—	—	
A Tribute to Miles (with Wayne Shorter, Tony Williams, Ron Carter and Wallace Roney)	Recorded September 19, 1992 + 1994; Released 1994; Label: Qwest; Format: CD, Download, LP, Tape	—	—	2	—	—	—	—	—	—	—	—	
Dis Is da Drum	Recorded 1993–1994; Released 1994; Label: Mercury; Format: CD, Download, Tape	—	—	—	2	—	—	65	—	40	38	—	BVMI: Gold (Jazz)
The New Standard	Recorded June 14–16, 1996; Released February 19, 1996; Label: Verve; Format: CD, 2CD, 2LP, Download, Tape	—	—	2	—	—	—	64	—	39	45	—	
1+1 (with Wayne Shorter)	Released July 1, 1997; Label: Verve; Format: CD, Download, Tape	—	—	2	—	—	—	—	—	—	—	—	BVMI: Gold (Jazz)
Gershwin's World	Recorded March–June 1998; Released October 20, 1998; Label: Verve; Format: CD, Download, SACD	—	—	1	—	47	—	76	—	—	—	—	BVMI: Gold (Jazz)
Future 2 Future	Released September 25, 2001; Label: Transparent Music; Format: CD, LP	—	—	—	2	111	—	45	—	—	—	—	
Possibilities (duets album)	Recorded 2005; Released August 30, 2005; Label: Hear Music, Hancock Music, Vector; Format: CD, Download	22	—	—	1	—	80	66	33	—	95	—	RIAA: Gold
River: The Joni Letters	Recorded 2006–2007; Released September 25, 2007; Label: Verve; Format: CD, Download, LP	5	—	—	1	70	54	51	76	—	61	179	
The Imagine Project (duets album)	Released June 22, 2010; Label: Hancock, Red; Format: CD, Download, LP	54	—	—	1	77	27	101	35	—	29	—	
"—" denotes a recording that did not chart or was not released in that territory.

=== Live albums ===
==== Releases that charted ====
List of live albums, with selected chart positions
Title	Album details	Peak chart positions			
Title	Album details	US	US R&B	US Jazz (Trad)	JPN
V.S.O.P.	Release date: April, 1977; Label: Columbia; Format: CD, Download, LP, SACD, Tape	79	24	5	65
An Evening with Herbie Hancock & Chick Corea: In Concert (with Chick Corea)	Release date: November 1978; Label: Columbia; Format: CD, Download, LP, Tape	100	—	8	—
CoreaHancock (with Chick Corea)	Release date: 1979; Label: Polydor; Format: CD, Download, LP, Tape	175	—	19	—
Directions in Music: Live at Massey Hall (with Roy Hargrove and Michael Brecker)	Release date: June 11, 2002; Label: Verve; Format: CD, Download	—	—	2	62
"—" denotes a recording that did not chart or was not released in that territory.

==== Releases that did not chart ====
List of other live albums
Title	Album details
Hear, O Israel – A Prayer Ceremony in Jazz	Release date: 1968; Label: Jonny; Format: CD, LP
Flood	Release date: 1975; Label: CBS / Sony; Format: CD, Download, LP
V.S.O.P.-The Quintet	Release date: 1977; Label: CBS / Sony; Format: CD, LP
A Night with Herbie Hancock	Release date: 1980; Label: Manhattan; Format: LP
Jazz Africa (with Foday Musa Suso)	Release date: 1987; Label: Verve; Format: CD, Tape
Parallel Realities Live... (with Jack DeJohnette, Pat Metheny and Dave Holland)	Release date: 1993; Label: Jazz Door; Format: CD
Herbie Hancock Trio Live in New York (with Jeff Littleton and Gene Jackson)	Release date: 1994; Label: Jazz Door; Format: CD
Quartet Live (with Al Foster, Buster Williams, Greg Osby, Michael Brecker and Bobby McFerrin)	Release date: 1994; Label: Jazz Door; Format: CD
Live: Detroit / Chicago	Release date: July 12, 2005; Label: Hudson Street; Format: CD, Download

=== Compilations ===
==== Releases that charted ====
List of compilations, with selected chart positions
Title	Album details	Peak chart positions				
Title	Album details	US	US R&B	US Jazz (Trad)	FRA	JPN
Treasure Chest	Release date: 1974; Label: Warner Bros.; Format: LP	158	31	—	—	—
The Best of Herbie Hancock	Release date: 1979; Label: Columbia; Format: CD, Download, LP, Tape	—	—	27	—	—
Then and Now: The Definitive Herbie Hancock	Release date: September 23, 2008; Label: Verve; Format: CD, Download, LP	—	—	8	30	65
"—" denotes a recording that did not chart or was not released in that territory.

==== Releases that did not chart ====
List of other compilations
Title	Album details
The Best of Herbie Hancock	Release date: 1971; Label: Blue Note; Format: LP, Tape
Herbie Hancock	Release date: September 1975; Label: Blue Note; Format: CD, LP
Happy the Man	Release date: 1976; Label: Arista; Format: LP
Hancock Alley	Release date: 1980; Label: Manhattan; Format: CD, Download, LP, Tape
Double Rainbow	Release date: 1981; Label: Columbia; Format: LP
Hot and Heavy	Release date: 1984; Label: Premier; Format: CD, Download, LP, Tape
The Best of Herbie Hancock: The Blue Note Years	Release date: 1988; Label: Blue Note; Format: CD, Download, LP, Tape
Feets Don't Fail Me Now / Future Shock	Release date: 1989; Label: Columbia; Format: LP
The Very Best of Herbie Hancock	Release date: 1991; Label: Columbia; Format: CD, LP
The Collection	Release date: 1991; Label: Castle; Format: CD
A Jazz Collection	Release date: March 16, 1991; Label: Columbia; Format: CD, Download, Tape
The Best of Herbie Hancock, Vol. 2	Release date: 1992; Label: Columbia; Format: CD
The Collection	Release date: July 1, 1992; Label: Griffin; Format: CD
Herbie Hancock	Release date: 1993; Label: Musica Jazz; Format: CD
The Egg	Release date: 1993; Label: Music Mirror; Format: CD
Jamming	Release date: July 27, 1994; Label: Royal Co.; Format: CD, Tape, 8-Track
Mwandishi: The Complete Warner Bros. Recordings	Release date: November 22, 1994; Label: Warner Bros.; Format: CD, Download
Jazz Portrait	Release date: September 1, 1995; Label: TriStar; Format: CD
Takin' Off / Inventions And Dimensions / Empryean Isles	Release date: October 1, 1995; Label: Blue Note; Format: CD
Cantaloupe Island	Release date: 1995; Label: Blue Note; Format: CD, Download
Jazz & Blues Collection, Vol. 63	Release date: 1996; Label: Edition Atlas; Format: CD
Jazz Profile	Release date: April 1, 1997; Label: Blue Note; Format: CD, Download
This Is Jazz, Vol. 35	Release date: April 28, 1998; Label: Columbia; Format: CD, Download
Mr. Funk	Release date: 1998; Label: Columbia; Format: CD
Rare Tracks	Release date: August 28, 1998; Label: Import; Format: CD
The Complete Blue Note Sixties Sessions	Release date: October 6, 1998; Label: Blue Note; Format: CD, Download
Dr. Jazz: The Blue Note Years 1962 / 69	Release date: 1998; Label: Blue Note; Format: CD, Download
Dancin' Grooves	Release date: January 21, 1999; Label: SME; Format: CD
Riot	Release date: April 13, 1999; Label: Blue Note; Format: CD
Backtracks (with Quincy Jones)	Release date: September 28, 1999; Label: Renaissance; Format: CD, Download
Les Incontournables	Release date: January 4, 2000; Label: WEA International; Format: CD
Sextant / Secrets	Release date: January 17, 2000; Label: Sony; Format: CD
The Best of Herbie Hancock	Release date: January 17, 2000; Label: EMI; Format: CD
The Best of Herbie Hancock: The Hits	Release date: February 8, 2000; Label: Columbia / Legacy; Format: CD, Download
Jammin' with Herbie Hancock	Release date: 2000; Label: Collecteables; Format: CD, Download
Head Hunters / Future Shock / Man-Child	Release date: September 17, 2001; Label: Jazz; Format: CD
The Herbie Hancock Box	Release date: October 1, 2002; Label: Columbia / Legacy; Format: CD, Download
Head Hunters / Thrust	Release date: December 16, 2002; Label: Sony; Format: CD
Thrust / Mr. Hands / Secrets	Release date: October 6, 2003; Label: Jazz; Format: CD
Blue Note Years, Vol. 20	Release date: April 27, 2004; Label: Blue Note; Format: CD
Jazz Moodes: 'Round Midnight	Release date: June 15, 2004; Label: Legacy / Columbia; Format: CD, Download
Rockit	Release date: August 16, 2004; Label: Delta No. 1; Format: CD
Head Hunters / Sextant / Thrust	Release date: December 14, 2004; Label: Columbia; Format: CD
Soul Power	Release date: April 4, 2005; Label: Double Gold; Format: CD
Herbie Hancock	Release date: June 7, 2005; Label: Platinum Disc; Format: CD
The Essential Herbie Hancock	Release date: February 21, 2006; Label: Columbia / Legacy; Format: CD, Download
Great Sessions	Release date: April 4, 2006; Label: Blue Note; Format: CD
The Very Best of Herbie Hancock	Release date: August 14, 2006; Label: Music Brokers; Format: CD
Piano Fiesta (with Chick Corea)	Release date: October 17, 2006; Label: Jazz Hour; Format: CD
Techno Voodu — Astral Black Simulations	Release date: February 21, 2007; Label: Legacy; Format: CD
Finest in Jazz	Release date: June 4, 2007; Label: Blue Note; Format: CD
The Herbie Hancock Trio in Concert	Release date: October 8, 2007; Label: Jazz Hour; Format: CD
Soul and Funk (with James Brown and Quincy Jones)	Release date: May 19, 2008; Label: Mastercuts; Format: CD
Future Shock / Head Hunters	Release date: October 14, 2008; Label: Legacy; Format: CD
Playlist: The Very Best of Herbie Hancock	Release date: October 28, 2008; Label: Columbia / Legacy; Format: CD, Download
Les Incontournables du Jazz : Herbie Hancock	Release date: 2008; Label: Warner Jazz; Format: CD
The Best of Herbie Hancock Box Set	Release date: October 9, 2009; Label: Blue Note; Format: CD
Milken Archive Digital (this box includes Hear O Israel)	Release date: September 1, 2011; Label: Milken Archive Digital; Format: Download
Complete Columbia Collection Box Set	Release date: November 16, 2013; Label: Sony; Format: CD

- Some of these compilations were re-issued many times with different titles. Sometimes the re-issues included the same track list in a different order and/or with small variations with some bonus tracks.

=== Soundtrack albums ===
List of soundtrack albums, with selected chart positions
Title	Album details	Peak chart positions			
Title	Album details	US	US R&B	US Jazz (Trad)	SWE
Blow-Up	Release date: October 1966; Label: MGM; Format: CD, LP	192	—	—	—
The Spook Who Sat by the Door	Release date: 1973; Label: United Artists; Format: LP	—	—	—	—
Death Wish	Release date: 1974; Label: Columbia; Format: CD, Download, LP	—	38	—	—
Round Midnight	Release date: 1986; Label: Columbia; Format: CD, Download, LP, Tape	196	—	2	28

== Singles ==
=== Physical singles ===
==== Physical releases that charted ====
List of physical singles, with selected chart positions and certifications
Title	Year	Peak chart positions										Certifications	Album
Title	Year	US	US R&B	US Dance	US Jazz Digital	FRA	GER	NL	SWE	SWZ	UK	Certifications	Album
"Watermelon Man"	1963	— (Note: "Watermelon Man" did not enter the Billboard Hot 100, but peaked at number 21 on the Billboard Bubbling Under Hot 100.)	—	—	—	—	—	—	—	—	—		Takin' Off
"Chameleon"	1974	42	18	—	—	—	—	—	—	—	—		Head Hunters
"Palm Grease"	1974	—	45	—	—	—	—	—	—	—	—		Thrust
"Doin' It"	1976	— (Note: "Doin' It" did not enter the Billboard Hot 100, but peaked at number 4 on the Billboard Bubbling Under Hot 100.)	83	40	—	—	—	—	—	—	—		Secrets
"I Thought It Was You"	1978	—	85	—	—	—	—	—	—	—	15		Sunlight
"You Bet Your Love"	1979	—	—	—	—	—	—	—	—	—	18		Feets, Don't Fail Me Now
"Tell Everybody"	1979	—	—	47	—	—	—	24	—	—	—		Feets, Don't Fail Me Now
"Ready or Not"	1979	—	25	—	—	—	—	—	—	—	—		Feets, Don't Fail Me Now
"Stars in Your Eyes"	1980	—	33	—	—	—	—	—	—	—	—		Monster
"Making Love"	1980	—	73	—	—	—	—	—	—	—	—		Monster
"Magic Number"	1981	—	59	9	—	—	—	—	—	—	—		Magic Windows
"Everybody's Broke"	1981	—	46	—	—	—	—	—	—	—	—		Magic Windows
"Lite Me Up!"	1982	—	52	—	—	—	—	—	—	—	—		Lite Me Up
"Gettin' to the Good Part"	1982	—	47	—	—	—	—	—	—	—	—		Lite Me Up
"Rockit"	1983	71	6	1	40	9	6	7	10	4	8	RIAA: Gold	Future Shock
"Autodrive"	1983	—	26	36	—	—	53	39	—	—	33		Future Shock
"Future Shock"	1983	—	—	—	—	—	—	—	—	—	54		Future Shock
"Mega-Mix"	1984	— (Note: "Mega-Mix" did not enter the Billboard Hot 100, but peaked at number 5 on the Billboard Bubbling Under Hot 100.)	—	38	—	—	—	—	—	—	—		Future Shock
"Hardrock"	1984	—	41	53	—	—	—	—	—	—	65		Sound-System
"Vibe Alive"	1988	—	25	46	—	—	—	—	—	—	—		Perfect Machine
"—" denotes a recording that did not chart or was not released in that territory.

==== Physical releases that did not chart ====
List of other physical singles
Title	Year	Album
"Blind Man, Blind Man (Parts 1 & 2)"	1963	My Point of View
"Fat Mama" / "Wiggle Waggle"	1969	Fat Albert Rotunda
"Crossings" / "Water Torture"	1972	Crossings
"Watermelon Man" / "Sly"	1973	Head Hunters
"Spank-A-Lee" / "Actual Proof"	1974	Thrust
"Hang Up Your Hang Ups" / "Sun Touch"	1975	Man-Child
"Sunlight" / "Come Running To Me"	1978	Sunlight
"Don't Hold It In" / "It All Comes Around"	1980	Monster
"Go for It"	1980	Monster
"Just Around the Corner"	1980	Mr. Hands
"Fun Tracks"	1982	Lite Me Up
"Paradise"	1982	Lite Me Up
"Metal Beat"	1984	Sound-System
"People Are Changing"	1984	Sound-System
"Beat Wise"	1988	Perfect Machine
"Call It '94"	1994	no album
"The Essence" (with Chaka Khan)	2001	Future 2 Future
"Rockit 2.002"	2002	no album

=== Promotional singles ===
==== Promotional releases that charted ====
List of promotional singles, with selected chart positions
Title	Year	Peak chart positions			Album
Title	Year	US Dance	US Jazz (Smooth)	US Jazz (Digital)	Album
"Go For It" / "Saturday Night" / "Stars In Your Eyes"	1980	12	—	—	Monster
"A Song for You" (with Christina Aguilera)	2006	—	11	—	Possibilities
"River" (with Corinne Bailey Rae)	2007	—	28	—	River: The Joni Letters
"Imagine" (with P!nk, Seal, India.Arie, Jeff Beck, Konono N°1 and Oumou Sangaré)	2010	—	22	7	The Imagine Project
"—" denotes a recording that did not chart or was not released in that territory.

==== Promotional releases that did not chart ====
List of other promotional singles
Title	Year	Album
"Knee Deep"	1979	Feets, Don't Fail Me Now
"Saturday Night"	1980	Monster
"Dis Is da Drum Sampler"	1995	no album
"Call It '95"	1995	Dis Is da Drum
"Bring Down the Birds"	2008	Blow-Up

== Other charted songs ==
List of songs, with selected chart positions
Title	Year	Peak chart positions	Album
Title	Year	US Jazz (Digital)	Album
"Stitched Up" (with John Mayer)	2010	25	Possibilities
"Don't Give Up" (with P!nk and John Legend)	2010	15	The Imagine Project
"Tomorrow Never Knows" (with Dave Matthews)	2010	24	The Imagine Project
"A Change Is Gonna Come" (with James Morrison)	2010	47	The Imagine Project

== See also ==
- Herbie Hancock other appearances
- The Headhunters
- V.S.O.P.

== Notes ==
- a From 1989, SNEP lists greatest hits and compilation albums of the artists in a compilation chart (already active from 1987 only for the various artists compilations).
  Prior the launch of the SNEP Singles Chart on November 3, 1984, there wasn't a reliable weekly chart for the singles in France. So, in 2000, Fabrice Ferment in collaboration with SNEP compiled monthly charts for the pre-SNEP chart period based on retail sales of the time.
- b Before Oricon launched the albums chart (started in 1987), it published only albums charts classified as follows: LPs (1970-1989), Cassettes (1974-1995) and CDs (1985-1997). For pre-1987 peak positions, the LP chart is used, as that was the main medium.
- c Prior September 8, 1993, the IFPI Swedish charts were bi-weekly.
- d Between October 20, 1984, and December 4, 1993, the Billboard jazz albums charts were bi-weekly. Note that Top Contemporary Jazz Albums was established on February 28, 1987, and before this date, Contemporary jazz albums were charted on the Top Traditional Jazz Albums (at the time known simply as Top Jazz Albums).
- e Between June 1, 1959, and August 24, 1985 Billboard published the Bubbling Under Hot 100 Singles, which ranked the songs that failed to chart on the Billboard Hot 100. In December 1970, a bubbling under chart was created for the albums that failed to enter into the Billboard 200 and was called Bubbling Under Top LPs. This list closed on August 24, 1985. The bubbling under charts came back on December 5, 1992, with Bubbling Under Hot 100 Singles and Bubbling Under R&B / Hip-Hop Singles. The latter lists the singles that failed to enter into the Hot R&B / Hip-Hop Songs.
- f RIAA certifications are based on shipment sales in the United States and, on request by the label, RIAA certifies albums and singles as Gold (500,000 units), Platinum (every 1 million units) and Diamond (every 10 million units).
- g BVMI certifications are based on retail sales in Germany calculated by GEMA and other societies. For the low sales of the jazz records, BVMI established a jazz division in 1992 only for albums and singles of the genre released from this date; on request by the label, BVMI certifies them as Gold (every 10,000 copies) and Platinum (every 20,000 copies).
