= Future 2 Future =

Album by Herbie Hancock

Studio album by Herbie Hancock
- Released: July 8, 2001
- Recorded: 2001
- Genres: Jazz, electronica, jazz fusion
- Labels: Transparent, Columbia (Japan)
- Producers: Bill Laswell, Herbie Hancock

Herbie Hancock chronology
Gershwin's World (1998)	Future 2 Future (2001)	Directions in Music: Live at Massey Hall (2002)

Professional ratings
Review scores
Source	Rating
AllMusic	3/5 stars
Tom Hull	B+
The Penguin Guide to Jazz Recordings	2.5/4 stars

Future 2 Future is the thirty-eighth album by Herbie Hancock. Hancock reunited with producer Bill Laswell (who worked on the early 1980s albums Future Shock, Sound-System and Perfect Machine). The two tried to repeat the success of the three previous albums that combine jazz with electronic music.

== Content ==
Hancock reunited with producer/bassist Bill Laswell, who had co-produced Future Shock (noted for the song "Rockit"). In contrast to their previous productions, Future 2 Future is more electronica oriented. Hancock plays conservatively, holding to chords and sweeps. The more intricate sounds on each track are the beats (whether played on a drum kit or electronically generated) and the use of turntables.

Besides Grandmixer DXT, who played an eminent role in the aforementioned 1980s productions, heard here on "The Essence" (which also features Chaka Khan on vocals and was lifted as single), the artists from the electronica club scene are Detroit techno pioneer Carl Craig, A Guy Called Gerald, a jungle and drum and bass protagonist, and another turntablist, Rob Swift. On the 'jazz side' there are contributions by long-time collaborators saxophonist Wayne Shorter and drummer Jack DeJohnette, as well as bassist Charnett Moffett. There is also a drum track by the late Tony Williams on a composition that carries his name in tribute, accompanied by a static bass guitar line by Laswell, soprano saxophone from Wayne Shorter and spoken poetry by Dana Bryant. Laswell brought in Ethiopian singer Gigi (and his wife) for some tracks. Another song features jazz singer Imani Uzuri. The last track, "Virtual Hornets", refers to a composition from the last album of Hancock's ‘Mwandishi’ band, Sextant, in which Hancock recreates the original sound of the initial buzzing ARP synthesizer motif.

After releasing the album, Hancock formed a band (with Terri Lyne Carrington, Wallace Roney and others) that took the tracks on tour, and a film of the tour's stop at the Knitting Factory in Hollywood was made and released on DVD as Future 2 Future Live. The concert video features also live versions of his best-known songs "Dolphin Dance", "Butterfly", "Rockit" and "Chameleon."

For the coupled-out song "The Essence", a driving drum and bass track that features Chaka Khan on vocals, several remixes were produced by DJ Krush, LTJ Bukem, and Joe Claussell. They were released on separate 12" EPs, combined with the original version, sometimes with the addition of "This Is Rob Swift."

Future 2 Future and the EP output are the only productions Hancock released on Transparent Music, a label he created in the late 1990s with Chuck Mitchell (once president of Verve Records) and David Passick (Hancock's manager).

== Critical reception ==
- AllMusic gave a positive 3/5 review, stating that while the album fails to live up to expectations, it is "an enjoyable exercise in watching one of the greats in jazz music redefine himself with the times once again."
- Grove Dictionary of Music gave 3/5.
- JazzTimes gave no numeric rating, stating that the album lacks focus and the performances are uninspired. The best tracks are the last four instrumentals ("Ionosphere", "Kebero Part II", "Alphabeta", "Virtual Hornets").

== Track listing ==
">" indicates a segue directly into the next track.

1. "Kebero Part I" (Herbie Hancock, Bill Laswell, Carl Craig, Gigi) - > 3:10
2. "Wisdom" (Hancock) - > 0:33
3. "The Essence" (Hancock, Laswell, Chaka Khan) - > 4:54
4. "This Is Rob Swift" (Hancock, Rob Swift, Laswell, Jack DeJohnette) - 6:55
5. "Black Gravity" (Gerald Simpson, Hancock, Laswell) - 5:29
6. "Tony Williams" (Hancock, Tony Williams, Laswell, Dana Bryant) - 6:09
7. "Be Still" (Hancock, Laswell, Imani Uzuri) - 5:12
8. "Ionosphere" (Hancock, Laswell, Karsh Kale) - > 3:59
9. "Kebero Part II" (Hancock, Laswell, Craig, Gigi) - 4:47
10. "Alphabeta" (Hancock, Laswell) - 5:29
11. "Virtual Hornets" (Hancock, Laswell) - 8:51

Future 2 Future Live DVD

1. "Wisdom" - 5:45
2. "Kebero" - 9:59
3. "This Is DJ Disk" (a.k.a. "This Is Rob Swift") - 10:10
4. "Dolphin Dance" (Hancock) - 21:30
5. "Virtual Hornets" - 14:37
6. "The Essence" - 6:55
7. "Butterfly" (Hancock, Bennie Maupin) - 6:02
8. "Tony Williams" - 5:30
9. "Rockit" (Laswell, Hancock, Michael Beinhorn) - 5:04
10. "Chameleon" (Hancock) - 17:41

== Personnel ==
- Herbie Hancock – keyboards
- Charnett Moffett – double bass (3, 7, 11)
- Bill Laswell – bass guitar (4, 6)
- Jack DeJohnette – drums (4, 7, 10, 11)
- Karsh Kale – drums (3, 8), program beats (8)
- Tony Williams – drums (6)
- Wayne Shorter – tenor saxophone, soprano saxophone (6, 7, 11)

Guest musicians

- Carl Craig – programming, beats (1, 9)
- Grandmaster DXT – turntables (3)
- Rob Swift – turntables, programming (4)
- A Guy Called Gerald – programming, beats (5)
- Gigi – vocals (1, 9)
- Elenni Davis-Knight – spoken vocals (2)
- Chaka Khan – vocals (3)
- Dana Bryant – vocals, words (6)
- Imani Uzuri – vocals (7)

Concert tour lineup (and DVD)

- Herbie Hancock – keyboards
- Darrell Diaz – keyboards, vocals
- DJ Disk – turntables
- Wallace Roney – trumpet
- Matthew Garrison – double bass, bass guitar
- Terri Lyne Carrington – drums, vocals
