= Jazzvisions =

1986 jazz concert series

Jazzvisions: Made in America

Compilation album
- Recorded: December 1986; Wiltern Theater
- Genre: Jazz
- Labels: Verve, PolyGram

Jazzvisions: Made in America was a series of jazz concerts held in December 1986 at the Wiltern Theater in Los Angeles.

The concerts were later released on CD, cassette, LP, VHS and Laserdisc by Verve Video and PolyGram. The home video editions were produced by Lorimar Home Video subsidiary of Lorimar-Telepictures in collaboration with music producer Jack Lewis.

== Concerts ==
- Rio Revisited (Antônio Carlos Jobim, Gal Costa)
- Jump The Blues Away (Albert Collins, Etta James, Joe Walsh)
- All Strings Attached (Tal Farlow, John Abercrombie, Larry Coryell, Larry Carlton, John Patitucci, Billy Hart)
- Implosions (Stanley Clarke, Frank Morgan, Ernie Watts, Roger Kellaway, McCoy Tyner, Eric Gale, Randy Brecker, Peter Erskine)
- Brazilian Knights and a Lady (Djavan, Ivan Lins, Patti Austin)
- Jazz Africa (Herbie Hancock, Foday Musa Suso)
- The Many Faces of Bird - A Tribute to Charlie Parker (Richie Cole, Lee Konitz, James Moody, Bud Shank, Bobby McFerrin, Lou Levy, Monty Budwig, John Guerin)
- Familia (Pete Escovedo, Sheila E., Tito Puente)
- Echoes of Ellington, Vol. 1 (Dianne Reeves, Randy Brecker, Bill Evans, Robben Ford)
- Echoes of Ellington, Vol. 2 (Randy Brecker, Bill Evans, Robben Ford, Tom Scott)
- The Jazz Soul of Porgy & Bess (Johnny Mandel, Australia and Japan only)
