= David Em =

American digital art pioneer

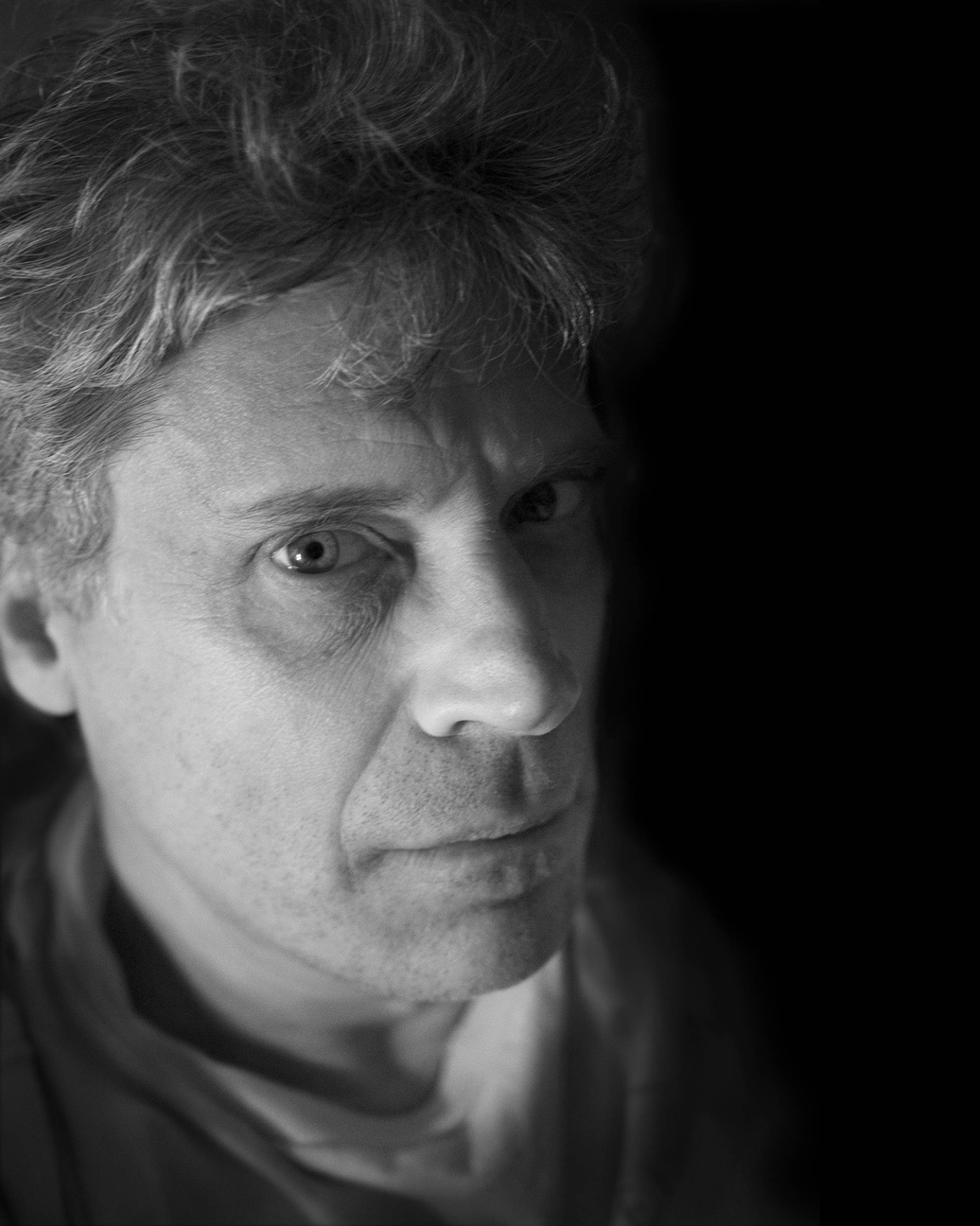
- David Em in his Los Angeles studio
- Born: 1952 (age 73–74); Los Angeles, California, United States
- Education: Pennsylvania Academy of the Fine Arts; American Film Institute
- Known for: Digital art

David Em (born 1952) is an American digital artist, known for his pioneering breakthroughs in computer art. He lives in Los Osos in San Luis Obispo County, California.

== Early life ==
David Em was born in 1952 in Los Angeles, California. His father was a petroleum engineer and his mother was an illustrator. When he was a year old, the family moved to South America, where he grew up.

He studied painting for three years at the Pennsylvania Academy of the Fine Arts. In 1972, he set up a studio in San Francisco, where he began working with digital art.

Escher, 1979, Digital Image.

== Career ==
Em started working with digital media before there were personal computers. He created his first digital picture in 1975 at the Xerox Palo Alto Research Center (Xerox PARC) in Palo Alto, California, using SuperPaint, "the first complete digital paint system".

In 1976, he designed articulated 3D digital insects at Information International, Inc. that could walk, jump, and fly, some of the first 3D characters created by a fine artist.

Em became the first artist to produce navigable virtual worlds in 1977 at NASA’s Jet Propulsion Laboratory (JPL), where he was Artist in Residence from 1976 to 1988. He also created digital art at the California Institute of Technology (1985–1988), and Apple Computer (1991). Em has worked independently since the early 1990s.

His digital art has been written about in Time, Newsweek, The New York Times, the Los Angeles Times, The Boston Globe, Der Spiegel, and many other publications.

His images have been presented internationally, including at the Centre Pompidou, the Musee d’Art Moderne de la Ville de Paris, Harvard's Carpenter Center for the Visual Arts, MIT, the Museum of Contemporary Art, Los Angeles, and the Academy of Motion Pictures Arts and Sciences.

Em's art has also appeared in popular media, including the covers of Herbie Hancock's Future Shock, Sound-System, and Perfect Machine albums and an electronic version of William Gibson’s Neuromancer.

He is the first digital artist to have his working papers acquired by the Smithsonian Archives of American Art.

== Scope of work ==
Em's art spans multiple media, including virtual worlds, film, photography, printmaking, generative art, and live performance. His work is independent of any group or movement.

He says he "makes pictures with electronic light, sculpts with memory", and "evolves images that grow into and out of each other".

Stylistically, Em's art has connections to Surrealism, abstract painting, and experimental film. Gardner's Art Through the Ages describes his work as "futuristic geometric versions of Surrealistic dreamscapes in which the forms seem familiar and strange at the same time."

Some of his early digital art created at the Jet Propulsion Laboratory incorporates deep-space themes. In the 1980s he produced light effects reminiscent of the French Impressionists, and in the 1990s he introduced otherworldly lifeforms into his images. His recent work makes references to neuroscience.

== Reception ==
During the early stages of Em's career, most people did not believe computers could be used for creative purposes. Em's widely disseminated digital images helped reverse that perception. According to the Digital Art Museum's web site, "His piece Transjovian Pipeline (1979) became one of the most reproduced artworks in the 1980s."

Em had several noted early supporters, including the author Ray Bradbury, who dedicated a poem to Em's work titled "Em Squared", in which he wrote, "He is preeminent in a field that is as swiftly flowing and changing as a storm stabbing its way across country walking on stilts of electric fire."

Whitney Museum of Art director David Ross wrote a monograph about Em's art in which he said, "His electronic creations have redefined the territory of technological art."

In a feature article on his work in Smithsonian Magazine, editor Paul Trachtman stated that "Em’s images…may be the art world’s equivalent of astronaut Neil Armstrong’s footstep on the moon."
