= 'Round Midnight (song) =

1943 jazz standard by Thelonious Monk

Song by Thelonious Monk
- Published: 1944 by Advanced Music Corp.
- Genre: Bebop
- Composer: Thelonious Monk

"'Round Midnight" (sometimes titled "'Round About Midnight") is a 1943 composition by American jazz pianist Thelonious Monk that quickly became a jazz standard and has been recorded by a wide variety of artists. A version recorded by Monk's quintet was added to the Grammy Hall of Fame in 1993. It is one of the most recorded jazz standards composed by a jazz musician.

== Composition and Monk's first recording ==
It is thought that Monk composed the song sometime in 1940 or 1941. However, Monk's longtime manager Harry Colomby claims the pianist may have written an early version around 1936 (at the age of 19). The song was copyrighted September 24, 1943, in C minor under the title "I Need You So", with lyrics by a friend of Monk's named Thelma Murray. The first recording was made by Cootie Williams on August 22, 1944, after the pianist Bud Powell persuaded Williams to record the tune. Monk first recorded the song on November 21, 1947. It later appeared on the Blue Note album Genius of Modern Music: Volume 1, and Monk recorded it several times after that. His first version was transcribed by Lionel Grigson in A Thelonious Monk Study Album (Novello, 1993).

Jazz trumpeters Cootie Williams and Dizzy Gillespie further embellished the song, with songwriter Bernie Hanighen adding his own lyrics. Williams composed an eight-bar interlude, played by the ensemble on his recording. This interlude is not included on any of Monk's recordings and is rarely if ever played. The lyrics were copyrighted November 27, 1944, and again April 13, 1945, under the title "Grand Finale". Both Williams and Hanighen received co-credits for their contributions. The commonly played intro to "'Round Midnight" was originally composed by Dizzy Gillespie for the end of his arrangement for "I Can't Get Started", but later adopted it to the intro for "'Round Midnight". Gillespie later reused the arrangement for "I Can't Get Started", and recorded it for Birks' Works and Something Old, Something New.

== Later versions ==
The song is sometimes incorrectly called "'Round About Midnight", as Miles Davis used this as the title of his 1957 Columbia Records album 'Round About Midnight that included a version based on Dizzy Gillespie's arrangement. It became a signature song for Davis; his performance of it with Monk at the 1955 Newport Jazz Festival, which was heard by producer George Avakian, was crucial in securing him a recording contract with Columbia Records. He had previously recorded the song in the studio two other times, once for Prestige in 1953 and again in 1956 as released on Miles Davis and the Modern Jazz Giants. Art Blakey & the Jazz Messengers also apparently preferred to use the title "'Round About Midnight", as opposed to the original "'Round Midnight", in several recordings they made of the song.

A recording by Jimmy McGriff was used as the 6pm closedown theme in the early days of Radio Caroline in 1964.

In 1971, Ron Grainer used a down-tempo variation by Cootie Williams to accompany a memorable scene from The Omega Man. The song later appeared on a 2004 Gotan Project CD, Inspiración Espiración, featuring Chet Baker.

In 1986, the song was used as the title for the film Round Midnight, which starred veteran saxophonist Dexter Gordon in a fictional story about an expatriate American jazz musician living in Paris, France. The soundtrack by Herbie Hancock prominently features the song "'Round Midnight", along with a number of other jazz standards and a handful of original pieces written by Hancock.

In 2002, Italian pianist Emanuele Arciuli commissioned a number of composers to create the Round Midnight Variations. They included Roberto Andreoni, Milton Babbitt, Alberto Barbero, Carlo Boccadoro, William Bolcom, David Crumb, George Crumb, Michael Daugherty, Filippo Del Corno, John Harbison, Joel Hoffman, Aaron Jay Kernis, Gerald Levinson, Tobias Picker, Matthew Quayle, Frederic Rzewski, Augusta Read Thomas and Michael Torke.

== Notable recordings ==
=== By Monk ===
Recording date	Appears on	Duration	Release date	Solo	Live	Note	Reference
1947/11/21	Genius of Modern Music	3:10	1951			The same version was already released in 1947 as a single with "Well, You Needn't" as the B-side; today the compilation Genius of Modern Music: Volume 1 is more established.	
1954/06/04	Piano Solo	5:13	1954	A	A	France only release	
1957/04/12	Thelonious Himself	6:44	1957	A		The original CD reissue, released in 1987 via Original Jazz Classics/Riverside Records, includes an extensive 22-minute solo recording of "'Round Midnight" outtakes and experimentation in the studio.	
1957/08/13	Mulligan Meets Monk	8:29	1957				
1958/07/09	Thelonious in Action	6:15	1989		A	Bonus track on 1989-CD reissue	
1960/04/29	Thelonious Monk at the Blackhawk	12:07	1960		A		
1961/04/15	The First European Concert '61	7:09	1991		A	unofficial release	
1961/05/16	Thelonious Monk In Stockholm	6:52	1987		A	unofficial release	
1963/02/09	Spastic And Personal				A	unofficial release	
1964/10/31	Live at the It Club	6:32	1982		A		
1964/11/03	Live at the Jazz Workshop	9:10	1982		A		
1966/03/27	Switzerland 1966		1991		A	unofficial release	
1968/11/19	Monk's Blues	3:49	1990			with quartet and big band; originally released in 1968, but the track was first featured on the CD reissue in 1990 as a bonus track (recorded at the same session)	
1968	Straight No Chaser – Music From The Motion Picture (OST)	2:14	1989		A		
1970/10/04	Thelonious Monk In Tokyo				A		
1971/11/14	The Giants of Jazz	8:17	1972		A	as "The Giants of Jazz" with Art Blakey, Dizzy Gillespie, Al McKibbon, Sonny Stitt and Kai Winding; other recordings of the group have been made while touring Europe in 1971 and released as bootlegs	
1972/06/15	The Last Concerts	6:54	2009		A		
1972/09/16	Live At The 1972 Monterey Jazz Festival	5:15	2008/08/05		A	as "Art Blakey and The Giants of Jazz"	
1975/07/03	The Last Concerts	7:40	2009		A		

=== By others ===
Recording Year	Interpreter	Appears on	Release Year	Note	Reference
1944	Cootie Williams	Cootie Williams and His Orchestra 1941–1944	1995	First known recording of the song	
1946	Dizzy Gillespie	Modern Jazz Trumpets		Gillespie added an introduction and later that year a cadenza for big band arrangement, which "proved so popular that Monk added it (albeit an altered version) to his own performance... It is now a standard part of the song."	
1950	Charlie Parker	One Night in Birdland	1977	Released by Columbia Records on LP.	
1953	Miles Davis	Collectors' Items	1956		
1954	Bud Powell	Jazz Original	1955		
1955	Miles Davis	Miles Davis at Newport 1955-1975: The Bootleg Series Vol. 4	2015	Monk on piano; this gig has become comeback for Davis; it earned him the contract with Columbia Records, resulting in his 'Round About Midnight the following year	
1956	Miles Davis	'Round About Midnight	1957		
1956	Miles Davis	Miles Davis and the Modern Jazz Giants	1959	Monk participated on the record but not on the track.	
1956	June Christy	The Misty Miss Christy	1956		
1956	Kenny Dorham	'Round About Midnight at the Cafe Bohemia	1957		
1956	Art Farmer & Donald Byrd	2 Trumpets	1957		
1957	Jimmy Smith	Jimmy Smith Trio + LD	1957		
1957	Billy Taylor	The New Billy Taylor Trio	1958		
1958	Michel Legrand	Legrand Jazz	1958		
1958	Mel Tormé	Tormé	1958		
1958	Gil Evans	New Bottle Old Wine	1958		
1959	Art Pepper	Art Pepper + Eleven – Modern Jazz Classics	1960	arranged by Marty Paich	
1959	Wes Montgomery	The Wes Montgomery Trio	1959		
1959	Sun Ra	Sound Sun Pleasure!!	1970		
1960	Julie London	Around Midnight	1960		
1960	The Nashville All-Stars	After the Riot at Newport	1961	featuring Hank Garland, Chet Atkins, Boots Randolph, Floyd Cramer, Bob Moore, Buddy Harman, Gary Burton & Brenton Banks	
1961	Ella Fitzgerald & Lou Levy	Clap Hands, Here Comes Charlie!	1962		
1961	George Russell	Ezz-thetics	1961		
1961	Miles Davis	Directions	1980	Compilation; the whole concert recording was released in 2003 as In Person Friday and Saturday Nights at the Blackhawk, Complete.	
1961	Grant Green	Green Street	1961		
1961	Art Farmer & Benny Golson	The Jazztet at Birdhouse	1961		
1961 or 1962	Bud Powell	'Round About Midnight at the Blue Note	1994	Trio with Pierre Michelot and Kenny Clarke	
1962	Milt Jackson	Big Bags	1962		
1962	Barry Harris	Chasin' the Bird	1962		
1962	Jimmy McGriff	I've Got a Women	1963		
1962	Betty Carter	'Round Midnight '63	1963		
1962	Sam Jones	Down Home	1962		
1963	Bill Evans	Conversations with Myself	1963		
1963	Bill Evans	Time Remembered	1983		
1963	Bill Evans	At Shelly's Manne-Hole	1963		
1963	Sarah Vaughan	Sarah Sings Soulfully	1963		
1963	Dizzy Gillespie	Something Old, Something New	1963		
1963	Freda Payne	After the Lights Go Down Low and Much More!!!	1964		
1963	Oscar Peterson & Nelson Riddle	Oscar Peterson and Nelson Riddle	1963		
1964	Bill Evans	The Bill Evans Trio "Live"	1971		
1964	Sonny Rollins	Now's the Time	1964		
1964	Ella Fitzgerald	Ella in Japan: 'S Wonderful	2011		
1964	Bud Powell	Return to Birdland	1989	Trio with John Ore and J. C. Moses	
1965	Bud Powell	Ups 'n Downs	1973	Solo piano; was ill.	
1965	Bill Evans	Trio '65	1965		
1965	George Russell	George Russell Sextet at Beethoven Hall	1965		
1965	Andy Bey	'Round Midnight	1965		
1966	Wes Montgomery & Jimmy Smith	Further Adventures of Jimmy and Wes	1966		
1966	Baden Powell	Tristeza On Guitar	1967		
1967	Bill Evans	California Here I Come	1982		
1969	Miles Davis	1969 Miles – Festiva De Juan Pins	1993	The whole concert recording was released in 2013 as Live in Europe 1969: The Bootleg Series Vol. 2.	
1969	Bill Evans	Autumn Leaves	1980		
1969	Bill Evans	You're Gonna Hear from Me	1988		
1969	Betty Carter	Round Midnight '75	1975		
1969	Illinois Jacquet	The Blues; That's Me!	1969		
1970	Joe Henderson	If You're Not Part of the Solution, You're Part of the Problem	1970		
1971	Joe Henderson	Joe Henderson in Japan	1971		
1972	Kenny Burrell	'Round Midnight	1972		
1973	Joe Pass	Virtuoso	1973		
1976	Barry Harris	Live in Tokyo	1976		
1976	Dexter Gordon	Homecoming: Live at the Village Vanguard	1977		
1977	Joe McPhee	Variations on a Blue Line	1979		
1978	Art Pepper	Among Friends	1978		
1979	Joe Pass & Niels-Henning Ørsted Pedersen	Northsea Nights	1979		
1979	Ella Fitzgerald	A Perfect Match	1979		
1980	Sun Ra Arkestra	Sunrise in Different Dimensions	1981		
1981	Chick Corea	Trio Music	1981		
1981	Herbie Hancock	Quartet	1982		
1981	Freddie Hubbard	Keystone Bop Vol. 2: Friday & Saturday	1996		
1981	Mal Waldron & Steve Lacy	Live at Dreher, Paris 1981	1996		
1982	Abdullah Ibrahim	African Dawn	1982		
1984	Dorothy Ashby	Django/Misty	1984		
1984	Various Artists	That's the Way I Feel Now: A Tribute to Thelonious Monk	1984	Interpretation by Joe Jackson	
1984	Michel Petrucciani	Live at the Village Vanguard	1985		
1984	Stanley Jordan	Magic Touch	1985		
1984	Kronos Quartet	Monk Suite	1984		
1985	Herbie Hancock	Round Midnight	1986	Soundtrack for Bertrand Tavernier's 1986 movie of the same name	
1985	Dexter Gordon	The Other Side of Round Midnight	1986	Recorded during the shooting of for the 1986 film; produced and arranged by Hancock as well.	
1985	Ahmad Jamal	Live at the Montreal Jazz Festival 1985	1986		
1986	Linda Ronstadt	For Sentimental Reasons	1986		
1986	Helen Merrill	Music Makers	1986		
1987	Matia Bazar	Melò (album) Oggi è già domani... Intorno a mezzanotte ('Round Midnight)	1987	Text and adaptation in Italian by Aldo Stellita	
1987	Mikio Masuda	Smokin' Night	1988		
1988	Carmen McRae	Carmen Sings Monk	1988		
1988	Hue & Cry	Bitter Suite	1989		
1989	Charlie Rouse	Epistrophy	1989		
1989	Charlie Haden	The Montreal Tapes: Tribute to Joe Henderson	2004		
1989	David Moss	"My Favorite Things"	1990	Intakt Records CD	
1989	Chick Corea	Alive	1991		
1990	Art Ensemble of Chicago & Cecil Taylor	Thelonious Sphere Monk: Dreaming of the Masters Series Vol. 2	1992		
1990	Chick Corea & Bobby McFerrin	Play	1990		
1991	Big Sugar	Big Sugar	1991		
1991	Cassandra Wilson	Live	1991		
1991	Ran Blake	Epistrophy	1991		
1991	Emil Viklický	'Round Midnight	1991		
1991	Cassandra Wilson	After the Beginning Again	1997		
1992	GRP All-Star Big Band	GRP All-Star Big Band	1992		
1993	Elkie Brooks	Round Midnight	1996		
1996	Lee Konitz	Alone Together	1997	with Brad Mehldau & Charlie Haden	
1996	Kurt Rosenwinkel	East Coast Love Affair	1996		
1996	Elkie Brooks	Amazing	1996		
1997	Ronnie Earl	The Colour of Love	1997		
1997	Bill Holman	Brilliant Corners: The Music of Thelonious Monk	1997		
1998	Steve Rochinski	A Bird in the Hand	1999	this version was arranged by Tal Farlow specifically for Steve Rochinski	
1998	Andy Summers	Green Chimneys	1999	vocals by Sting (musician)	
1999	Keith Jarrett	Whisper Not	2000	with his "Standards Trio"	
2000	Jessica Williams	The Real Deal	2004		
2001	Billy Cobham	The Art of Three	2001		
2002	Ledisi	Feeling Orange but Sometimes Blue	2002		
2003	Alexander von Schlippenbach	Monk's Casino	2005		
2004	Amy Winehouse	Frank (Deluxe edition)	2004		
2004	Gotan Project	Inspiración Espiración	2004		
2004	Chaka Khan	ClassiKhan	2004		
2007	Keith Jarrett & Charlie Haden	Last Dance	2014		
2011	Joanna MacGregor	Joanna MacGregor Plays Gershwin & The American Songbook	2011	Transcription of Thelonious Monk's 1954 solo recording.	
2012	Sylvia Brooks	Restless	2012		
2013	Earl Klugh	HandPicked	2013		
2017	Miho Hazama	The Monk: Live at Bimhuis	2018	with Metropole Orkest	
2017	Wadada Leo Smith	Solo: Reflections and Meditations on Monk	2015		
2018	Jon Batiste	Anatomy of Angels: Live at the Village Vanguard	2019		
2022	Jeanfrançois Prins	Blue Note Mode	2024	In quartet with Danny Grissett, Jay Anderson, and E. J. Strickland. Prins partly re-harmonized the tune, making it resolve in minor.	
