= Speak Like a Child =

Speak Like a Child may refer to:

- "Speak Like a Child" (song), a single by The Style Council
- Speak Like a Child (album), an album by Herbie Hancock
