= 1986 Los Angeles Film Critics Association Awards =

12th LA Film Critics Awards

12th LAFCA Awards
- Date: December 13, 1986

Highlights
- Best Picture: Hannah and Her Sisters

The 12th Los Angeles Film Critics Association Awards were announced on 13 December 1986 and given on 29 January 1987.

== Winners ==
- Best Picture:
  - Hannah and Her Sisters
  - Runner-up: Blue Velvet
- Best Director:
  - David Lynch – Blue Velvet
  - Runner-up: Woody Allen – Hannah and Her Sisters
- Best Actor:
  - Bob Hoskins – Mona Lisa
  - Runner-up: Dexter Gordon – Round Midnight
- Best Actress:
  - Sandrine Bonnaire – Vagabond (Sans toit ni loi)
  - Runner-up: Marlee Matlin – Children of a Lesser God
- Best Supporting Actor:
  - Dennis Hopper – Blue Velvet and Hoosiers
  - Runner-up: Michael Caine – Hannah and Her Sisters
- Best Supporting Actress (tie):
  - Cathy Tyson – Mona Lisa
  - Dianne Wiest – Hannah and Her Sisters
- Best Screenplay:
  - Woody Allen - Hannah and Her Sisters
  - Runner-up: David Lynch – Blue Velvet
- Best Cinematography:
  - Chris Menges – The Mission
  - Runner-up: Bruno de Keyzer - Round Midnight
- Best Music Score:
  - Herbie Hancock and Dexter Gordon – Round Midnight
  - Runner-up: Ennio Morricone - The Mission
- Best Foreign Film:
  - Vagabond (Sans toit ni loi) • France
  - Runner-up: My Beautiful Laundrette • UK
- Experimental/Independent Film/Video Award (tie):
  - Jonas Mekas – He Stands in the Desert Counting the Seconds of His Life
  - Nina Menkes – Magdalena Viraga
- New Generation Award:
  - Spike Lee – She's Gotta Have It
- Career Achievement Award:
  - John Cassavetes
- Special Citation:
  - Precious Images
  - Rafigh Pooya
