= Mr. Bow-tie =

Studio album by Ron Carter
- Released: July 19, 1995
- Recorded: February 17–18, 1995
- Studio: Clinton Recording Studios, NYC
- Genre: Jazz
- Length: 64:50
- Label: Somethin' Else; TOCJ-5575, Blue Note
- Producer: Ron Carter

Ron Carter chronology
A Tribute to Miles (1994)	Mr. Bow-tie (1995)	Brandenburg Concerto (1996)

Mr. Bow-tie is an album by bassist Ron Carter recorded in 1995 and originally released on the Japanese Somethin' Else label with a US release on Blue Note Records.

== Reception ==
Professional ratings
Review scores
Source	Rating
AllMusic	4/5 stars

The AllMusic review by Scott Yanow observed "All of the music is straightahead and the playing is consistently colorful. This is an impressive effort that is easily recommended".

== Track listing ==
All compositions by Ron Carter except where noted

1. "Mr. Bow-Tie" – 7:07
2. "Well, You Needn't" (Thelonious Monk) – 6:43
3. "Fill in the Blanks" – 7:06
4. "I Thought About You" (Jimmy Van Heusen, Johnny Mercer) – 7:32
5. "Nearly" – 8:55
6. "Cut and Paste" – 4:45
7. "Stablemates" (Benny Golson) – 6:54
8. "Wait for the Beep" – 3:52
9. "M.S.R.P." – 6:29
10. "St. Thomas" (Sonny Rollins) – 5:27

== Personnel ==
Musicians

- Ron Carter - bass
- Edwin Russel – trumpet (tracks 2–10)
- Javon Jackson – tenor saxophone (track 2–10)
- Gonzalo Rubalcaba – piano (tracks 1, 2, 4, 5, 7, 10)
- Lewis Nash – drums
- Steve Kroon – percussion (tracks 1, 2, 4 & 6–10)

Production

- Ron Carter – producer
- Hitoshi Namekata – executive producer
- James Anderson - engineer (recording, mixing)
- Yoshio Okazaki – engineer (mastering)
