= The Art of Three =

Live album by Billy Cobham
- Released: 2001
- Recorded: January 2001
- Genre: Jazz
- Length: 73:47
- Label: Blow it Hard Records
- Producer: William E. Cobham Jr.

Billy Cobham chronology
North By NorthWest (2002)	The Art of Three (2001)	Culture Mix (2002)

Professional ratings
Review scores
Source	Rating
Allmusic	4.5/5 stars

The Art of Three is a 2001 live album by the jazz trio of Billy Cobham, Ron Carter and Kenny Barron containing excerpts from two concerts of their 2001 European tour.

== Track listing ==
1. "Stella By Starlight" (Ned Washington, Victor Young) – 10:43
2. "Autumn Leaves" (Joseph Kosma, Johnny Mercer, Jacques Prévert) – 10:00
3. "New Waltz" (Ron Carter) – 6:55
4. "Bouncing With Bud" (Bud Powell) – 7:02
5. "'Round Midnight" (Bernie Hanighen, Thelonious Monk, Cootie Williams) – 7:56
6. "And Then Again" (Kenny Barron) – 11:25
7. "I Thought About You" (Mercer, Jimmy Van Heusen) – 10:26
8. "Someday My Prince Will Come" (Larry Morey, Frank Churchill) – 9:19

== Personnel ==
- Billy Cobham – Drums
- Ron Carter – Bass
- Kenny Barron – Piano

=== Credits ===
- Blaise Grandjean – Engineer
