= The Other Side of Round Midnight =

Soundtrack album by Dexter Gordon
- Released: 1986
- Recorded: July 1–12 and August 20–23, 1985
- Genre: Jazz
- Length: 42:21
- Label: Blue Note
- Producer: Herbie Hancock, Michael Cuscuna

Dexter Gordon chronology
Round Midnight (1986)	The Other Side of Round Midnight (1986)	Both Sides of Midnight (1988)

The Other Side of Round Midnight is an album by American jazz saxophonist Dexter Gordon recorded in 1985 and released on the Blue Note label. The album was recorded during the making of Bertrand Tavernier's 1986 film Round Midnight, and it consists of tracks that were not included in the Academy Award-winning soundtrack album for the film. The album features the last recordings released under Gordon's name (although he does not appear on all tracks), produced and arranged by Herbie Hancock.

== Reception ==
The Allmusic review by Scott Yanow awarded the album 3 stars and calling it "Not essential but interesting".

== Track listing ==
1. "'Round Midnight" (Thelonious Monk) – 7:46
2. "Berangere's Nightmare #2" (Herbie Hancock) – 4:35
3. "Call Sheet Blues" (Wayne Shorter, Herbie Hancock, Ron Carter, Billy Higgins) – 6:05
4. "What Is This Thing Called Love?" (Cole Porter) – 3:35
5. "Tivoli" (Dexter Gordon) – 4:10
6. "Society Red" (Dexter Gordon) – 5:30
7. "As Time Goes By" (Herman Hupfeld) – 4:15
8. "It's Only a Paper Moon" (Harold Arlen, E. Y. Harburg, Billy Rose) – 7:43
9. "'Round Midnight" (Thelonious Monk) – 6:28

- Recorded live at Studio Eclair, Épinay-sur-Seine, France
  Additional recording at Studio Davout and Studio Phillipe Sarde, Paris

== Personnel ==
- Dexter Gordon – tenor saxophone (tracks 1, 6 & 7), soprano saxophone (5)
- Wayne Shorter – soprano saxophone (1), tenor saxophone (3)
- Freddie Hubbard (2 & 6), Palle Mikkelborg (1 & 5) – trumpet
- Herbie Hancock (1–4 & 7–9), Cedar Walton (5 & 6) – piano
- Ron Carter (1–3 & 6), Mads Vinding (1 & 5), Pierre Michelot (7 & 8) – double bass
- Billy Higgins (1, 3, 5, 7 & 8), Tony Williams (2 & 6) – drums
- Bobby McFerrin – vocals (4, duo with H. Hancock)
- John McLaughlin – guitar (7)
- Bobby Hutcherson – vibes (8)
