= Sandra Reaves-Phillips =

American actress, writer and singer (1944–2023)

- Born: December 23, 1944; Mullins, South Carolina, U.S.
- Died: December 29, 2023 (aged 79); Queens, New York, U.S.
- Occupation: Actress

Sandra Reaves-Phillips (December 23, 1944 – December 29, 2023) was an American actress, writer, and singer.

Reaves-Phillips was born in Mullins, South Carolina, and made her Broadway debut as Mama Younger in the 1973 musical Raisin. She later performed in many stage productions, including Ma Rainey's Black Bottom, Black and Blue, Blues in the Night, Harmony, American Dreams, Before It Hits Home, and The Late Great Ladies of Blues and Jazz. She received Joseph Jefferson award nomination for Low Down Dirty Blues in 2010. She also received two nominations for an Helen Hayes Award and received a Drama League Award for Outstanding Performer for Rollin' on the T.O.B.A. on Broadway.

Reaves-Phillips also appeared in a number of movies, include The Happy Hooker (1975), Round Midnight (1986) for which she received NAACP Image Awards nomination for Outstanding Actress in a Motion Picture, Lean on Me (1989), and For Love or Money (1993). On television, she appeared in Homicide: Life on the Street and Law & Order.

Reaves-Phillips died on December 29, 2023, aged 79.
