= Imani Uzuri =

American vocalist and composer

- Born: United States
- Genres: Soul, jazz
- Occupations: Vocalist, composer
- Website: www.imaniuzuri.com

Imani Uzuri is an American vocalist and composer.

Uzuri has collaborated with artists across various disciplines including co-writing and singing the song "Be Still" for Herbie Hancock's album Future 2 Future.

In 2012, Uzuri released her second album, The Gypsy Diaries, which was funded with a Kickstarter campaign. In January 2013, she appeared with the singer Morley at (Le) Poisson Rouge. Uzuri was a 2015 Park Avenue Armory artist-in-residence. March 2016 marked Uzuri's Lincoln Center's American Songbook series debut.

== Personal life ==
Uzuri is bisexual.
