= Bruno de Keyzer =

French cinematographer (1949–2019)

- Born: 11 August 1949; Maintenon, Eure-et-Loir, France
- Died: 25 June 2019 (aged 69); Villerville, France
- Occupation: Cinematographer
- Years active: 1975–2010

Bruno de Keyzer (11 August 1949 – 25 June 2019) was a French cinematographer.

== Biography ==
He began his film career as a camera assistant with Sven Nykvist for Black Moon, directed by Louis Malle (1974). He became director of photography in 1982 and worked with renowned filmmakers, including Bertrand Tavernier and Jerry Schatzberg.

He plays as an actor in Très bien, merci, by Emmanuelle Cuau (2007).

He lived in Villerville (Calvados, France).

== Filmography ==
- 2010 – The Princess of Montpensier
- 2009 – In the Electric Mist
- 2008 – Alarm
- 2007 – Très bien, merci
- 2006 – Les Européens
- 2005 – Zaina: Rider of the Atlas
- 2005 – Avant l'oubli
- 2001 – J'ai faim !!!
- 2000 – The Day the Ponies Come Back
- 2000 – About Adam
- 1999 – C'est pas ma faute!
- 1999 – Les collègues
- 1999 – Shooting the Past
- 1998 – Le Clone
- 1998 – The Commissioner
- 1997 – The Fifth Province
- 1997 – Mojo
- 1996 – Victory
- 1996 – Der Unhold
- 1996 – North Star
- 1995 – All Men Are Mortal
- 1994 – War of the Buttons
- 1994 – La Reina de la Noche
- 1992 – Double Vision
- 1992 – Max & Jeremie
- 1992 – The Railway Station Man
- 1991 – Afraid of the Dark
- 1991 – Impromptu
- 1991 – December Bride
- 1987 – Little Dorrit
- 1986 – The Murders in the Rue Morgue

== Awards ==
- Won 1985 César Awards for Best Cinematography – A Sunday in the Country
- Nominated 1990 César Awards for Best Cinematography – Life and Nothing But
- Nominated 2011 César Awards for Best Cinematography – The Princess of Montpensier
- Nominated 1986 Los Angeles Film Critics Associations Awards for Best Cinematography – Round Midnight
