= Round Midnight (film) =

1986 film by Bertrand Tavernier

- Theatrical release poster by Steven Chorney
- Directed by: Bertrand Tavernier
- Screenplay by: David Rayfiel; Bertrand Tavernier; Colo Tavernier (French language translation)
- Based on: Dance of the Infidels; 1986 book by Francis Paudras
- Produced by: Irwin Winkler
- Starring: Dexter Gordon; François Cluzet; Sandra Reaves-Phillips; Lonette McKee; Christine Pascal; Herbie Hancock; John Berry; Martin Scorsese
- Cinematography: Bruno de Keyzer
- Edited by: Armand Psenny
- Music by: Herbie Hancock
- Production companies: Little Bear; PECF
- Distributed by: Warner Bros.
- Release dates: September 12, 1986 (Toronto Festival of Festivals); October 3, 1986 (U.S.)
- Running time: 133 minutes
- Countries: United States; France
- Language: English
- Budget: $3 million
- Box office: $10 million

Round Midnight is a 1986 American musical drama film directed by Bertrand Tavernier and written by Tavernier and David Rayfiel. It stars Dexter Gordon, with a soundtrack by Herbie Hancock. The title comes from Thelonious Monk's 1943 composition "'Round Midnight", which is featured in this film in a Hancock arrangement.

The protagonist jazzman, Dale Turner, is based on a composite of real-life jazz legends Lester Young (tenor sax) and Bud Powell (piano). While the film is fictionalized, it is drawn directly from the memoir/biography Dance of the Infidels written by French author Francis Paudras, who had befriended Powell during his Paris expatriate days and on whom the character Francis was based.

Gordon was nominated for the Academy Award for Best Actor and won a Grammy for the film's soundtrack entitled The Other Side of Round Midnight in the category for Best Instrumental Jazz Performance, Soloist. Hancock won the Academy Award for Best Original Score. The soundtrack was released in two parts: Round Midnight and The Other Side of Round Midnight.

== Plot ==
In 1950s New York, Dale Turner is an accomplished saxophone player barely getting by playing at local jazz clubs and struggling with substance abuse, particularly of alcohol. After talking with a fellow musician who is currently disabled by illness, Dale decides to try to improve his life by traveling to Paris and making a living playing at Le Blue Note jazz club until his luck gets better.

Turner arrives in Paris and is befriended by Francis, a struggling French graphic designer specializing in film posters and who lives with his daughter, his marriage having broken up. Francis idolizes the musician and tries desperately to help him escape alcohol abuse. With time, and after Francis allows Turner to move in with him and his daughter, Turner manages to put himself on his own feet again and starts to get by without a reliance on alcohol. He eventually decides it is time to go home to New York to see his old friends and to re-acquaint himself with his own daughter.

Francis accompanies Dale, and the music community in New York is ready to accept the musician back. He writes a song dedicated to his daughter in the hope of strengthening their relationship after much time apart. He invites her to the club to hear its debut, but manages to confuse her true age and tells the audience she has just turned 15; she is actually 14, and she makes note of this to Francis, who is seated next to her in the audience. Later in the week, when Dale tries to further his bond with her by sharing a meal at a local diner, an old drug dealer recognizes him there, re-introduces himself and implies his supplies are still available to Dale.

Francis tries to intervene a few times to keep Dale protected from his old suppliers, and attempts to keep up with all of them. After Francis eventually leaves and returns to Paris and his daughter, he receives a telegram from Dale's music manager saying that the musician has died in a local hospital.

== Cast ==
- Dexter Gordon as Dale Turner
- François Cluzet as Francis Borler
- Gabrielle Haker as Berangere
- Sandra Reaves-Phillips as "Buttercup"
- Lonette McKee as Darcey Leigh
- Christine Pascal as Sylvie
- Herbie Hancock as Eddie Wayne
- Bobby Hutcherson as "Ace"
- Liliane Rovère as Madame Queen
- Pierre Trabaud as Francis's Father
- Frédérique Meininger as Francis's Mother
- Hart Leroy Bibbs as Hershell
- Ged Marlon as Beau
- Benoît Régent as Psychiatrist
- Victoria Gabrielle Platt as Chan Turner
- Arthur French as Booker
- John Berry as Ben
- Martin Scorsese as Goodley
- Philippe Noiret as Redon
- Alain Sarde as Terzian
- Eddy Mitchell as drunk at the Blue Note Bar
- Billy Higgins as Drums (Blue Note, Davout Studio)
- Éric Le Lann as Trumpet (Blue Note)
- John McLaughlin as Guitar (Blue Note)
- Pierre Michelot as Bass (Blue Note)
- Wayne Shorter as Tenor Saxophone (Blue Note), Soprano Saxophone (Davout Studio, Lyon)
- Ron Carter as Bass (Davout Studio, New York)
- Palle Mikkelborg as Trumpet (Davout Studio)
- Mads Vinding as Bass (Davout Studio, Lyon)
- Cheikh Fall as Percussion (Lyon)
- Michel Pérez as Guitar (Lyon)
- Tony Williams as Drums (Lyon, New York)
- Freddie Hubbard as Trumpet (New York)
- Cedar Walton as Piano (New York)
- Charles "Lolo" Bellonzi as Drums (private party, Paris)

== Production ==
Round Midnight was filmed in Paris and New York City. It was produced by Irwin Winkler.

Tavernier defied the film studio by insisting that real-life jazz tenor saxophonist Dexter Gordon play the role of Turner. Gordon, who himself played with Bud Powell in Paris in the early 1960s (and earlier in their careers), helped to revise and rewrite the script. The supporting cast is likewise composed of jazz musicians (mainly from the generation which followed Gordon and Powell) such as Herbie Hancock, Bobby Hutcherson, John McLaughlin, and Wayne Shorter, among others who perform the music throughout the film. The musicians are joined by actors François Cluzet, Gabrielle Haker, Sandra Reaves-Phillips, Lonette McKee, and Christine Pascal. Martin Scorsese and Philippe Noiret appear in cameos.

== Soundtrack ==
The score for the film was by Herbie Hancock, featuring mostly existing Jazz standards owned by Warner Bros along with a handful of original pieces written by Hancock. The soundtrack was in two parts – Round Midnight and The Other Side of Round Midnight – released under Dexter Gordon's name and featuring his last recordings, although he does not appear on all tracks. Both albums were produced and arranged by Hancock.

== Reception ==
On the review aggregator website Rotten Tomatoes, 100% of 25 critics' reviews are positive, with an average rating of 8/10. The website's consensus reads: "Brought brilliantly to life by Dexter Gordon's outstanding performance, Round Midnight is the rare jazz-inflected drama that matches the power of the music." It was ranked No. 2 in Roger Ebert's top films of 1986, and No. 9 in Gene Siskel's. In his review of the film for the Chicago Sun-Times, Ebert noted the film's use of live jazz performances by real musicians and praised Gordon's acting performance, writing, "Gordon plays the central role with an eerie magnetism. He is a musician, not an actor, and yet no actor could have given this performance, with its dignity, wisdom and pain.". Additionally, IndieWire cited Gordon's acting performance as one of the best of the 80s.

== Accolades ==
Award	Category	Nominee(s)	Result
Academy Awards	Best Actor	Dexter Gordon	Nominated
Academy Awards	Best Original Score	Herbie Hancock	Won
Bodil Awards	Best European Film		Won
British Academy Film Awards	Best Score	Herbie Hancock	Nominated
César Awards	Best Editing	Armand Psenny	Nominated
César Awards	Best Music	Herbie Hancock	Won
César Awards	Best Production Design	Alexandre Trauner	Nominated
César Awards	Best Sound	Bernard Leroux, Claude Villand, Michel Desrois and William Flageollet	Won
David di Donatello Awards	Best Foreign Actor	Dexter Gordon	Won
Golden Globe Awards	Best Actor in a Motion Picture – Drama	Dexter Gordon	Nominated
Golden Globe Awards	Best Original Score – Motion Picture	Herbie Hancock	Nominated
Los Angeles Film Critics Association Awards	Best Actor	Dexter Gordon	Runner-up
Los Angeles Film Critics Association Awards	Best Cinematography	Bruno de Keyzer	Runner-up
Los Angeles Film Critics Association Awards	Best Music Score	Herbie Hancock and Dexter Gordon	Won
NAACP Image Awards	Outstanding Actor in a Motion Picture	Dexter Gordon	Nominated
NAACP Image Awards	Outstanding Actress in a Motion Picture	Sandra Reaves-Phillips	Nominated
Nastro d'Argento	Best Foreign Director	Bertrand Tavernier	Won
Nastro d'Argento	Best Foreign Actor	Dexter Gordon	Won
National Board of Review Awards	Top Ten Films		8th Place
New York Film Critics Circle Awards	Best Foreign Language Film		3rd Place
Sant Jordi Awards	Best Foreign Actor	Dexter Gordon	Won
Venice International Film Festival	Golden Lion	Bertrand Tavernier	Nominated
Venice International Film Festival	Pasinetti Award	Bertrand Tavernier	Won
