= My Point of View =

Studio album by Herbie Hancock
- Released: Early September 1963
- Recorded: March 19, 1963
- Studios: Van Gelder Studio, Englewood Cliffs, NJ
- Genres: Jazz, post-bop, modal jazz
- Length: 34:37
- Labels: Blue Note Records; BST 84126
- Producer: Alfred Lion

Herbie Hancock chronology
| Takin' Off (1962) | My Point of View (1963) | Inventions & Dimensions (1963) |

Professional ratings
Review scores
| Source | Rating |
|---|---|
| Down Beat | 3/5 stars |
| Allmusic | 4/5 stars |
| The Rolling Stone Jazz Record Guide | 3/5 stars |
| The Penguin Guide to Jazz Recordings | 3/4 stars |

My Point of View is the second album by pianist Herbie Hancock. It was released in 1963 on Blue Note Records as BLP 4126 and BST 84126. Musicians featured are trumpeter Donald Byrd, trombonist Grachan Moncur III, tenor saxophonist Hank Mobley, guitarist Grant Green (on two tracks), bassist Chuck Israels and drummer Tony Williams.

== Overview ==
For his second album, Hancock remained rooted in the hard bop and soul jazz movements. As with his first album, he put together a classic hard bop small group, adding a trombone on three tracks to the trumpet and tenor sax parts he had previously written. Donald Byrd's 1961 album Royal Flush was Hancock's Blue Note debut. Hank Mobley, like Byrd, was in the midst of recording a long run of Blue Note albums as a leader. Additionally, Hancock added guitarist Grant Green for two songs that had a more pronounced soul jazz feel. With the composition "King Cobra", Hancock worked in the modal jazz idiom, which he used in 1965 when writing the jazz standard “Maiden Voyage”.

The album was one of the first releases featuring drummer Tony Williams, who was 17 years old at the time of this recording. Williams and Hancock joined Miles Davis's band two months after My Point of View was recorded, as part of a new group that would evolve into the "Second Great Quintet". With the exception of bassist Chuck Israels, every player on the album went on to release numerous jazz albums as a bandleader during the 1960s and 1970s, and each had at least two albums as a leader on Blue Note Records during the 1960s.

== Composition ==
Hancock wrote "Blind Man, Blind Man" to evoke "something that reflected [his] Negro background". The blind man standing in the corner playing his guitar was one of the things Hancock experienced in his neighborhood in Chicago. The piece is reminiscent of "Watermelon Man", one of his greatest hits. According to Hancock, "King Cobra" was an attempt to "expand the flow [of jazz tunes and chords] so that it would go in directions beyond the usual".

== Track listing ==
All compositions by Herbie Hancock

Side one

1. "Blind Man, Blind Man" – 8:19
2. "A Tribute to Someone" – 8:45

Side two

1. "King Cobra" – 6:55
2. "The Pleasure Is Mine" – 4:03
3. "And What If I Don't" – 6:35

CD re-release bonus track

6. "Blind Man, Blind Man" (alternate take) – 8:21

Note: On the CD reissue of the album, the length of "The Pleasure Is Mine" is incorrectly noted as being 8:00.

== Personnel ==
- Herbie Hancock – piano
- Donald Byrd – trumpet
- Grachan Moncur III – trombone
- Hank Mobley – tenor saxophone
- Grant Green – guitar (only 1, 5 & 6)
- Chuck Israels – bass
- Tony Williams – drums
