= Blow-Up (soundtrack) =

Soundtrack album by Herbie Hancock and the Yardbirds
- Released: February 20, 1967
- Recorded: Late 1966
- Length: 33:12
- Label: MGM
- Producer: Pete Spargo, James Austin, Julie D'Angelo

Herbie Hancock chronology
Maiden Voyage (1965)	Blow-Up (1967)	Speak Like a Child (1968)

Professional ratings
Review scores
Source	Rating
Allmusic	4.5/5 stars
The Penguin Guide to Jazz Recordings	3/4 stars

Blow-Up is a soundtrack album by American jazz pianist Herbie Hancock, featuring music composed for Michelangelo Antonioni's 1966 film Blowup. MGM Records released the album in the United States on 20 February 1967, and in the United Kingdom on 10 May. The album features performances by Hancock, trumpeters Freddie Hubbard and Joe Newman, alto saxophonist Phil Woods, tenor saxophonist Joe Henderson, guitarist Jim Hall, bassist Ron Carter and drummer Jack DeJohnette. Although Jimmy Smith is credited with playing organ on the album, some sources claim it was actually Paul Griffin who was at the sessions.

The liner notes to a 2000s CD release indicate that Hancock first recorded the score in London with British musicians, but rejected the results and re-recorded the music in New York. According to a Library of Congress listing, additional uncredited musicians at the New York sessions included Don Rendell on tenor sax and Gordon Beck on organ. London sessions are said to have involved Hancock, Rendell and Beck, along with Ian Carr on trumpet, Pete McGurk on acoustic bass, and Chris Karan on drums. Hancock is also listed as being the arranger and music director.

The album also includes "Stroll On" by the Yardbirds, a rewrite of their version of Tiny Bradshaw's "Train Kept A-Rollin'", featuring both Jeff Beck and Jimmy Page on lead guitar. This would become a precursor to Punk rock and Heavy metal music. The Yardbirds recorded the track on 3–5 October 1966 at Sound Techniques Studios in Chelsea, London.

A mono mix of this album (MGM E4447ST) features slightly longer versions of several songs. The CD of this soundtrack currently in print includes, along with Hancock's material, two songs by the Lovin' Spoonful recorded by British musicians, which are used as incidental music in the film, and two songs recorded by British rock act Tomorrow which were originally intended for use in the film. This CD also features an alternate take of "Bring Down the Birds."

The bassline of "Bring Down the Birds" was sampled by Deee-Lite for their 1990 single "Groove Is in the Heart."

== Track listing ==
All compositions by Herbie Hancock except where indicated.

Side one

1. "Main Title from Blow Up" - 1:41
2. "Verushka (Part 1)" - 2:47
3. "Verushka (Part 2)" - 2:15
4. "The Naked Camera" - 3:27
5. "Bring Down the Birds" - 1:55
6. "Jane's Theme" - 5:02

Side two

1. "Stroll On" (Yardbirds) - 2:49
2. "The Thief" - 3:17
3. "The Kiss" - 4:17
4. "Curiosity" - 1:35
5. "Thomas Studies Photos" - 1:17
6. "The Bed" - 2:39
7. "End Title Blow Up" - 0:52

== Personnel ==
- Herbie Hancock - piano, melodica
- Freddie Hubbard - trumpet
- Joe Newman - trumpet
- Phil Woods - alto saxophone
- Joe Henderson - tenor saxophone
- Jimmy Smith or Paul Griffin - organ
- Jim Hall - electric guitar
- Ron Carter - double bass
- Jack DeJohnette - drums

Track 7 performed by the Yardbirds:

- Jeff Beck - electric guitar
- Jimmy Page - electric guitar
- Keith Relf - lead vocals, harmonica
- Jim McCarty - drums
- Chris Dreja - bass guitar
