= Inventions & Dimensions =

Studio album by Herbie Hancock
- Released: 1964
- Recorded: August 30, 1963
- Studios: Van Gelder Studio, Englewood Cliffs, NJ
- Genres: Modal jazz, post-bop, latin jazz
- Length: 39:49
- Labels: Blue Note; BST 84147
- Producer: Alfred Lion

Herbie Hancock chronology
My Point of View (1963)	Inventions & Dimensions (1964)	Empyrean Isles (1964)

Succotash cover

Professional ratings
Review scores
Source	Rating
All About Jazz	(favorable)
Allmusic	4/5 stars
The Rolling Stone Jazz Record Guide	3/5 stars
The Penguin Guide to Jazz Recordings	3/4 stars

Inventions & Dimensions is the third album by Herbie Hancock, recorded on August 30, 1963, for Blue Note Records. It features Hancock with bassist Paul Chambers and percussionists Willie Bobo and Chihuahua Martinez. The album was reissued in the 1970s as Succotash, credited to Hancock and Bobo, but with the sides reversed. Inventions & Dimensions is unusual in prominently featuring Latin percussion whilst not being a Latin jazz album, rather presenting Hancock's further exploration of modal jazz and post-bop idioms.

== Track listing ==
All compositions by Herbie Hancock.

Side one

1. "Succotash" – 7:40
2. "Triangle" – 11:01

Side two

3. "Jack Rabbit" – 5:57
4. "Mimosa" – 8:38
5. "A Jump Ahead" – 6:33

CD reissue bonus track

6. "Mimosa" (alternate take) – 10:06

== Personnel ==
- Herbie Hancock – piano
- Paul Chambers – bass
- Willie Bobo – drums, timbales
- Osvaldo "Chihuahua" Martinez – percussion (not on track 5)
