= Empyrean Isles =

Studio album by Herbie Hancock
- Released: November 1964
- Recorded: June 17, 1964
- Studio: Van Gelder Studio (Englewood Cliffs, New Jersey)
- Genres: Hard bop; modal jazz; soul jazz
- Length: 35:20
- Label: Blue Note
- Producer: Alfred Lion

Herbie Hancock chronology
Inventions & Dimensions (1963)	Empyrean Isles (1964)	Maiden Voyage (1965)

Empyrean Isles is the fourth studio album by the American jazz pianist Herbie Hancock, released on Blue Note Records in November 1964. The album features Hancock alongside trumpeter Freddie Hubbard, bassist Ron Carter, and drummer Tony Williams.

== Recording and composition ==
Empyrean Isles was recorded at Van Gelder Studio in Englewood Cliffs, New Jersey, on June 17, 1964. Freddie Hubbard played cornet rather than his typical trumpet on the session. The four compositions on the album, including the future standard "Cantaloupe Island", are Hancock originals written over a two-year period.

== Reception ==
Professional ratings
Review scores
Source	Rating
AllMusic	5/5 stars
Down Beat	4/5 stars
Jazz Journal	4.5/5 stars
Jazzwise	5/5 stars
The Rolling Stone Jazz Record Guide	5/5 stars
The Penguin Guide to Jazz	4/4 stars

The Penguin Guide to Jazz awarded Empyrean Isles four out of four stars.

AllMusic critic Stephen Thomas Erlewine gave the album five out of five stars, calling it "a record that officially established Hancock as a major artist in his own right."

== Track listing ==
=== Original release ===
All tracks are written by Herbie Hancock.

Side 1
No.	Title	Length
1.	"One Finger Snap"	7:20
2.	"Oliloqui Valley"	8:28

Side 2
No.	Title	Length
1.	"Cantaloupe Island"	5:32
2.	"The Egg"	14:00
Total length:		35:20

=== 1999 CD reissue ===
All tracks are written by Herbie Hancock.

No.	Title	Length
1.	"One Finger Snap"	7:20
2.	"Oliloqui Valley"	8:28
3.	"Cantaloupe Island"	5:32
4.	"The Egg"	14:00
5.	"One Finger Snap" (alternate take)	7:37
6.	"Oliloqui Valley" (alternate take)	10:47

== Personnel ==
- Herbie Hancock – piano
- Freddie Hubbard – cornet
- Ron Carter – double bass
- Tony Williams – drums

=== Technical personnel ===
- Alfred Lion – producer
- Rudy Van Gelder – engineer
- Reid Miles – design
- Francis Wolff – photography
- Nora Kelly – liner notes

== Charts ==
Chart performance for Empyrean Isles
Chart (2023)	Peak position
German Albums (Offizielle Top 100)	67
US Top Album Sales (Billboard)	62
US Top Jazz Albums (Billboard)	5
