= A Tribute to Miles =

1994 jazz album

Studio album / Live album A celebration of the life & music of Miles Davis by Herbie Hancock, Wayne Shorter, Ron Carter, Wallace Roney and Tony Williams
- Released: March 22, 1994
- Recorded: September 19, 1992; 1994
- Venue: Berkeley Community Theatre
- Studios: Signet/Soundworks, Los Angeles
- Genres: Jazz, jazz fusion
- Length: 59:57
- Label: Qwest/Reprise/Warner Bros.
- Producers: Herbie Hancock, Wayne Shorter, Tony Williams, Ron Carter

Herbie Hancock chronology
Perfect Machine (1988)	A Tribute to Miles (1994)	Dis Is da Drum (1994)

Wayne Shorter chronology
Joy Ryder (1988)	A Tribute to Miles (1994)	High Life (1995)

Ron Carter chronology
Jazz, My Romance (1994)	A Tribute to Miles (1994)	Mr. Bow-tie (1995)

Wallace Roney chronology
Crunchin' (1993)	A Tribute to Miles (1994)	Mistérios (1994)

Professional ratings
Review scores
Source	Rating
AllMusic	3/5 stars
The Penguin Guide to Jazz Recordings	3/4 stars

A Tribute to Miles is a tribute album recorded by the then surviving members of the Miles Davis "Second Great" Quintet: pianist Herbie Hancock, saxophonist Wayne Shorter, bassist Ron Carter and drummer Tony Williams. Taking the Davis role was trumpeter Wallace Roney.

This album won all five men the Grammy Award for Best Jazz Instrumental Performance, Individual or Group at the 37th Annual Grammy Awards.

== Track listing ==
1. "So What" (Live) (Miles Davis) - 10:20
2. "RJ" (Ron Carter) - 4:06
3. "Little One" (Herbie Hancock) - 7:20
4. "Pinocchio" (Wayne Shorter) - 5:44
5. "Elegy" (Tony Williams) - 8:42
6. "Eighty One" (Miles Davis, Ron Carter) - 7:31
7. "All Blues" (Live) (Miles Davis) - 15:14

== Personnel ==
Musicians

- Herbie Hancock – piano, calliope
- Wayne Shorter – tenor saxophone, soprano saxophone
- Wallace Roney – trumpet
- Ron Carter – bass
- Tony Williams – drums

Production

- Herbie Hancock – producer
- Wayne Shorter – producer
- Ron Carter – producer
- Tony Williams – producer, liner notes
- Suzy Gaal – associate producer
- Tony Meilandt – executive producer
- James Heffernan – executive producer
- Bob Skye – engineer (live recording: tracks 1, 7)
- Tomoo Suzuki – engineer (studio recording: tracks 2–6, mixing)
- Allen Sides – engineer (mixing)
- Bernie Grundman – engineer (mastering)
- Manny LaCarrubba – assistant engineer
- Tom Hardisty – assistant engineer
- Dave Hecht – assistant engineer
- Eric Rudd – assistant engineer
- Mark Gilbeault – assistant engineer
- Rall Rogut – assistant engineer
- Hiroyuki Arakawa – photography
- Yohji Yamamoto – costume design
- Maxine Van-Cliffe Arakawa – art direction
- Takashi Ohmura – hair & make-up
- Dirk Walter – package design, illustration
