= Jazz Africa =

Live album by Herbie Hancock and Foday Musa Suso
- Released: November 1987
- Recorded: December 1986
- Venues: Wiltern Theatre, Los Angeles, California
- Genre: Jazz
- Length: 44:17
- Label: NEC Avenue
- Producer: Jack Lewis

Herbie Hancock chronology
Round Midnight (1986)	Jazz Africa (1987)	Perfect Machine (1988)

Professional ratings
Review scores
Source	Rating
AllMusic	4/5 stars

Jazz Africa is a live album by keyboardist Herbie Hancock and Gambian kora player Foday Musa Suso. The recording took place in Los Angeles, California's Wiltern Theatre as part of the 1986 concert series Jazzvisions. The performance was also released on videotape and laserdisc with additional concert performances.

== Track listing ==
1. "Kumbasora" – 6:15
2. "Debo" – 17:06
3. "Cigarette Lighter" – 13:05
4. "Jimbasing" – 7:51

All compositions by Foday Musa Soso
- Recorded live at the Wiltern Theatre, LA in December 1986

== Personnel ==
- Herbie Hancock - keyboards
- Foday Musa Suso - kora, vocals
- Aïyb Dieng - percussion
- Armando Peraza - percussion
- Adam Rudolph - percussion
- Joe Thomas - bass
- Hamid Drake - drums, percussion
- Abdul Hakeem - guitar
