= Maiden Voyage (Herbie Hancock album) =

Studio album by Herbie Hancock
- Released: May 17, 1965
- Recorded: March 17, 1965
- Studios: Van Gelder Studio; Englewood Cliffs, New Jersey
- Genres: Modal jazz, post-bop
- Length: 42:20
- Label: Blue Note
- Producer: Alfred Lion

Herbie Hancock chronology
Empyrean Isles (1964)	Maiden Voyage (1965)	Blow-Up (1966)

Professional ratings
Review scores
Source	Rating
AllMusic	5/5 stars
DownBeat	5/5 stars
Penguin Guide to Jazz	👑
The Rolling Stone Jazz Record Guide	5/5 stars
Uncut	4/5 stars

Maiden Voyage is the fifth album led by jazz musician Herbie Hancock, and was recorded by Rudy Van Gelder on March 17, 1965, for Blue Note Records. It was issued as BLP 4195 and BST 84195. Featuring Hancock with tenor saxophonist George Coleman, trumpeter Freddie Hubbard, bassist Ron Carter and drummer Tony Williams, it is a concept album aimed at creating an oceanic atmosphere. As such, many of the track titles refer to marine biology or the sea, and the musicians develop the concept through their use of space. The album was presented with the Grammy Hall of Fame Award in 1999.

== Overview ==
Coleman, Carter, Williams and Hancock himself were all recently a part of the Miles Davis quintet.

According to Bob Blumenthal's 1999 liner notes: "Blue Note logs indicate that an attempt had been made to record 'Maiden Voyage', 'Little One', and 'Dolphin Dance' six days earlier, with Hubbard on cornet and Stu Martin in place of Williams. Those performances were rejected at the time and have been lost in the ensuing years." A different version of "Little One" was recorded by Miles Davis and his quintet (by then including Wayne Shorter instead of Coleman) for the album E.S.P., also released in 1965.

Hancock cites Count Basie's "Shiny Stockings" as the main source of inspiration for "Dolphin Dance".

== Reception ==
The Penguin Guide to Jazz designated the album as part of its Core Collection with a four star rating, calling it "a colossal achievement from a man still just 24 years old". Stephen Thomas Erlewine of AllMusic describes the album as "arguably his finest record of the '60s, reaching a perfect balance between accessible, lyrical jazz and chance-taking hard bop".

== Legacy ==
"Maiden Voyage", "The Eye of the Hurricane" and "Dolphin Dance" have become jazz standards and are featured in Hal Leonard's New Real Book vol. 2. While being interviewed for KCET in 2011, Hancock said he considered "Maiden Voyage" to be his favorite of all of the compositions he had written. During an interview on KTLA in 2020, the composer told Frank Buckley that he originally wrote the tune for a television commercial. Hancock was the pianist on another version of "Maiden Voyage" for Bobby Hutcherson's album Happenings which was recorded in February 1966. Hancock rerecorded "Maiden Voyage" and "Dolphin Dance" on his 1974 album Dedication and updated the title track on his 1988 album Perfect Machine. "Dolphin Dance" was rerecorded in 1981 for the Herbie Hancock Trio album. Hancock has released live concert versions of "Maiden Voyage" on CoreaHancock (1979) and An Evening With Herbie Hancock & Chick Corea: In Concert (1980) (both with Chick Corea). Hancock recorded "Maiden Voyage" and "Eye of the Hurricane" with the VSOP Quintet on VSOP: Tempest in the Colosseum (1977).

== Track listing ==
All tracks are written by Herbie Hancock.

Side one
No.	Title	Length
1.	"Maiden Voyage"	7:57
2.	"The Eye of the Hurricane"	6:01
3.	"Little One"	8:47

Side two
No.	Title	Length
4.	"Survival of the Fittest"	10:03
5.	"Dolphin Dance"	9:16
Total length:		42:04

== Personnel ==
- Herbie Hancock – piano
- Freddie Hubbard – trumpet
- George Coleman – tenor saxophone
- Ron Carter – bass
- Tony Williams – drums

== Cover versions ==
Artists who have covered "Maiden Voyage", the title track, include:

- Bobby Hutcherson, on his 1966 album Happenings
- Denny Zeitlein on his 1967 album Zeitgeist
- Ramsey Lewis on his 1968 album Maiden Voyage
- Brian Auger and the Trinity, on the 1970 album Befour
- Grant Green, on his 1970 live album Alive! (CD reissue only)
- Blood, Sweat, and Tears, on their 1972 album New Blood
- Kellee Patterson, on her 1973 album Maiden Voyage
- O'Donel Levy on his 1973 album Dawn Of A New Day
- Norman Connors on his 1975 album Saturday Night Special
- Bobby Valentín, on his 1975 live album Va a la Cárcel
- Mark Murphy on his 1975 album Sings
- Jon Lucien on his 1975 album Song For My Lady
- Roswell Rudd on his 1977 album Flexible Flyer
- Sekitō Shigeo on his 1977 album Special Sound Series Vol. 4: Summertime
- Gary Boyle, on his 1978 album The Dancer
- Art Farmer on his 1983 album Maiden Voyage
- The rock band Phish performed the song in their early concerts. A live version was released on their album Colorado '88.
- Carl Anderson on his 1990 album Pieces Of A Heart
- Larry Willis Sextet on their 1994 album A Tribute To Someone
- Bossa Nostra on their 1998 album Kharmalion
- Nnenna Freelon on her 1998 album Maiden Voyage
- Jimpster on his 1999 album Messages From The Hub
- Billy Childs Trio on their 2000 album Bedtime Stories (A Tribute To Herbie Hancock)
- Toto, on their 2002 album Through the Looking Glass. This recording included elements of Hancock's 1974 song "Butterfly".
- Soul Glow on their 2003 album We Come Along
- Robert Glasper, on his 2004 album Mood. He recorded it again on his 2007 album In My Element.
- FAZJAZ.jp on their 2005 album Distortional Theory
- Eric Reed Trio on their 2005 album Blue Trane
- Eldar Djangirov on his 2005 album Eldar
- Austin Peralta, on his 2006 album Maiden Voyage
- Scott McGill, Michael Manring & Vic Stevens on thir 2006 album What We Do
- Warren Wolf on his 2009 album Black Wolf
- Conrad Herwig on his 2010 album The Latin Side Of Herbie Hancock
- Bobby Matos Afro Latin Jazz Ensemble on their 2011 album Beautiful As The Moon
- Eric Harland on his 2014 album Vipassana
- Antonio Farao on his 2015 album Boundaries
- Joey Alexander, on his 2016 album Countdown
- Mr Jukes on the 2020 album Blue Note Re:imagined

Artists who have covered "Dolphin Dance" include:

- Ahmad Jamal, on his 1971 album The Awakening
- Al Haig, on his 1975 album Chelsea Bridge
- Grover Washington Jr., on his 1976 album A Secret Place
- Bill Evans, on the 1980 album I Will Say Goodbye
- Kazumi Watanabe, on his 1989 album Kilowatt

Other covers include:

- Christian McBride, Nicholas Payton, and Mark Whitfield recorded a version of "The Eye of the Hurricane" on their 1997 album Fingerpainting: The Music of Herbie Hancock.
- Madlib remixed "Dolphin Dance" and combined it with the song "Peace" by Horace Silver on his 2003 album Shades of Blue.
- In 2008, jazz pianist John Beasley released a tribute to Hancock called Letter to Herbie, which features a re-working of "Maiden Voyage" called "Bedtime Voyage". The album also features a recording of "Eye of the Hurricane".

== Charts ==
Chart performance for Maiden Voyage
Chart (2021)	Peak position
Belgian Albums (Ultratop Flanders)	150
Belgian Albums (Ultratop Wallonia)	168
Swiss Albums (Schweizer Hitparade)	89
US Top Album Sales (Billboard)	25
US Top Jazz Albums (Billboard)	2

Chart (2026)	Peak position
Australian Jazz & Blues Albums (ARIA)	10

== See also ==
- 1965 in music
- Herbie Hancock discography
