= Gershwin's World =

Studio album by Herbie Hancock
- Released: October 20, 1998
- Recorded: March–June, 1998
- Genre: Jazz
- Length: 67:08
- Labels: Verve, Polygram
- Producer: Robert Sadin

Herbie Hancock chronology
1+1 (1997)	Gershwin's World (1998)	Future 2 Future (2001)

Professional ratings
Review scores
Source	Rating
All About Jazz	(favorable)
AllMusic	4.5/5 stars
Entertainment Weekly	A−
Tom Hull	B
The Penguin Guide to Jazz Recordings	3.5/4 stars

Gershwin's World is the thirty-seventh studio album by the American jazz pianist Herbie Hancock.

It contains songs written by George and Ira Gershwin, and their contemporaries. It features several prominent musicians, including Joni Mitchell, Kathleen Battle, Stevie Wonder, Wayne Shorter, Chick Corea, James Carter, Cyro Baptista, Kenny Garrett, Stanley Clarke, and the Orpheus Chamber Orchestra.

== Track listing ==
1. "Overture (Fascinating Rhythm)"
2. "It Ain't Necessarily So"
3. "The Man I Love" (feat. Joni Mitchell)
4. "Here Come de Honey Man"
5. "St. Louis Blues" (feat. Stevie Wonder)
6. "Lullaby"
7. "Blueberry Rhyme"
8. "It Ain't Necessarily So Interlude"
9. "Cotton Tail"
10. "Summertime" (feat. Joni Mitchell)
11. "My Man's Gone Now"
12. "Prelude in C# Minor"
13. "Concerto for Piano and Orchestra in G, 2nd Movement" (Maurice Ravel)
14. "Embraceable You"

== Personnel ==
- Alex Al– upright bass
- Toby Appel – viola
- Cyro Baptista – percussion
- Kathleen Battle – soprano, vocals
- Ronnie Bauch – violin
- Martha Caplin – concert master, violin
- Terri Lyne Carrington – drums, production assistant
- James Carter – soprano saxophone, tenor saxophone
- Susannah Chapman – cello
- Catherine Cho – violin
- Sarah Clarke – principal viola
- Stanley Clarke – bass
- Ira Coleman – bass, production assistant
- Chick Corea – piano
- Charles Curtis – cello
- Nicolas Danielson – violin
- Marji Danilow – bass
- Madou Dembelle – djembe
- Matthew Dine – English horn
- Massamba Diop – talking drum
- Karen Dreyfus – viola
- Jennifer Frautschi – violin
- Kenny Garrett – alto saxophone
- Marlon Graves – guitar, mixing, percussion
- Michael Finn – principal bassoon
- Brian Greene – oboe
- Bireyma Guiye – percussion
- Herbie Hancock – arranger, liner notes, organ, piano
- Eddie Henderson – flugelhorn, trumpet
- Cynde Iverson – bassoon
- Gene Jackson – drums
- Joanna Jenner – violin
- Renee Jolles – violin Eastman School of Music
- Chris Komer – horn
- Bakithi Kumalo – bass, guitar
- Elizabeth Mann – flute
- Cheik Mbaye – percussion
- Melissa Meel – cello
- Joni Mitchell – vocals
- Katherine Murdock – viola
- Charles Neidich – clarinet, E flat clarinet
- Ahling Neu – viola
- Donald Palma – principal bass
- Ellen Payne – violin
- Todd Phillips – violin
- Nardo Poy – viola
- William Purvis – principal horn
- Richard Rood – violin
- Eriko Sato – principal violin
- Wayne Shorter – soprano saxophone, tenor saxophone
- David Singer – clarinet
- Mina Smith – cello
- Clavin Wiersman – violin
- Peter Winograd – violin
- Stevie Wonder – arranger, harmonica, vocals
- Asmira Woodward-Page – violin
- Eric Wyrick – violin
- Naoko Tanaka – violin

=== Production ===
- David Charles Abell – consultant
- Robi Banerji – assistant engineer
- Istvan Banyai – artwork, illustrations
- Thom Cadley – assistant engineer
- Dave Darlington – engineer
- Rob Eaton – audio engineer, engineer
- Steve Genewick – assistant
- Clark Germain – audio engineer, engineer
- Fred Hedemark – assistant engineer
- Pete Karam – assistant engineer
- Jimmy Katz – photography, session photographer
- Theodora Kuslan – release coordinator
- Ron Martinez – assistant engineer
- Andreas Meyer – digital editing
- James Minchin – cover photo, photography
- Pedro Moreira – assistant, music assistant
- Melinda Murphy – production coordination
- Orpheus Chamber Orchestra
- Darcy Proper – digital editing
- Rob Rapley – digital editing, engineer
- Robert Sadin – arranger, audio production, drum programming, liner notes, percussion programming, producer, programming
- Doug Sax – mastering
- Al Schmitt – surround mix
- Bill Airey Smith – digital editing
- Jason Stasium – assistant engineer
- Brett Swain – assistant engineer
- Rich Breen – tracking engineer (Cottontail)
- Bruce Swedien – mixing
- David Swope – assistant engineer
- Kayo Teramoto – assistant engineer
- Camille Tominaro – production coordination
- Tom Truslow – production coordination
- Brian Vibberts – mixing
- Todd Whitelock – audio engineer, engineer
- Mark Wilder – mastering
- Robert Zuckerman – session photographer
