= Village Life =

Studio album by Herbie Hancock and Foday Musa Suso
- Released: December 1985 (Japan)
- Recorded: August 7–9, 1984
- Studios: CBS/Sony Shinanomachi, Shinanomachi, Tokyo
- Genres: Jazz fusion, Mandé music
- Length: 40:38
- Labels: CBS/Sony, Columbia
- Producers: Bill Laswell, Herbie Hancock

Herbie Hancock chronology
Sound-System (1984)	Village Life (1985)	Round Midnight (1986)

Village Life is an album by jazz pianist Herbie Hancock and Mandinka griot Foday Musa Suso. It was recorded in Japan and released in 1985. Hancock and Suso had worked together as part of a larger ensemble for Hancock's 1984 album Sound-System, and Village Life was recorded shortly after a world tour. There are no overdubs, Village Life was recorded live in the studio. The album was coproduced by Bill Laswell.

== Critical reception ==
Professional ratings
Review scores
Source	Rating
AllMusic	4.5/5 stars

The Globe and Mail wrote that "Hancock generally adds color in four pieces that move lightly when they move at all... Pretty, but ultimately a curio." The Christian Science Monitor wrote that "Hancock traces lacy patterns around Suso's native vamps, underscoring the latter's vocals."

== Track listing ==
1. "Moon/Light" (Hancock, Suso) - 7:57
2. "Ndan Ndan Nyaria" (Suso) - 9:50
3. "Early Warning" (Hancock) - 2:52
4. "Kanatente" (Hancock, Suso) - 19:59

== Personnel ==
Musicians

- Herbie Hancock - detunable Yamaha DX1 synthesizer, Yamaha RX-11 drum machine programming
- Foday Musa Suso - kora, talking drum, vocals

Production

- Herbie Hancock - producer
- Bill Laswell - producer
- Tony Meilandt - associate producer
- Dave Jerden - engineer (recording)
- Tomoo Suzuki - engineer (recording)
- Tetsuro Tomita - engineer (digital editing)
- Wally Traugott - engineer (mastering)
- Nobuhisa Kawabe - assistant engineer
- Shinichi Miyoshi - assistant engineer
- Prince Twin-Seven Seven - cover illustration
- Geoffrey Thomas - photography
- Roger Steffens - liner notes
