= Sylvia Brooks =

American jazz singer and songwriter

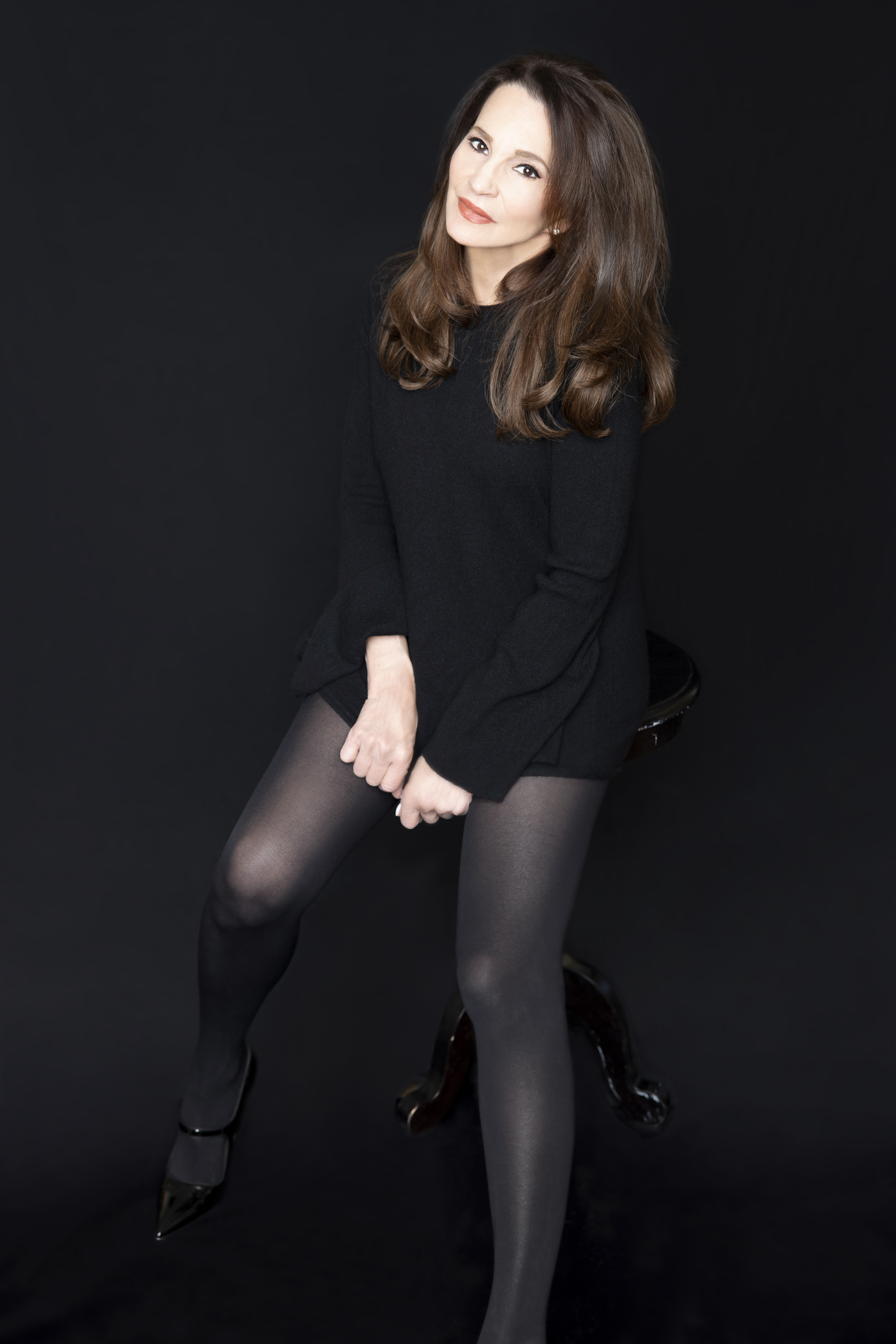

Background information
- Born: Sylvia Victoria Ippolito; Miami Beach, Florida, U.S.
- Genre: Jazz
- Occupations: Singer and songwriter
- Instrument: Vocals
- Years active: 2009–present
- Label: Rhombus Records
- Website: sylviabrooks.com

Sylvia Brooks is an American jazz singer and songwriter.

Sylvia Brooks started her career in classical theatre, having studied at the American Conservatory Theater under the direction of Allen Fletcher and Bill Ball.

In 2009, Brooks began singing jazz and collaborated with Thomas Garvin, who wrote the arrangements for her debut album Dangerous Liaisons. Brooks made her performing debut as a jazz singer at the Jazz Bakery in Los Angeles.

In 2012, Brooks released her second album, Restless, which introduced what she calls "jazz noir".

In 2017, Brooks released The Arrangement. She collaborated with Kim Richmond, Jeff Colella, Christian Jacob, Quinn Johnson, and Otmaro Ruiz. The Arrangement also began her journey into songwriting with three original songs co-written by Christian Jacob, Patrick Williams and Quinn Johnson. The Arrangement was named one of the top 15 Jazz vocal albums in 2017 by the 39th annual Jazz Radio Awards.

On May 30, 2022, Brooks released her 4th album Signature on Rhombus Records. It features seven original pieces with collaborators Tom Ranier, Christian Jacob and Jeff Colella. All About Jazz, in their review of the album, called Brooks a "master stylist".

On September 10, 2023, Brooks released her fifth album- her first live album "Sylvia Brooks Live with Christian Jacob", recorded live at Herb Albert's Vibrato Jazz Club in Los Angeles.

In January 2024, while at the Jazz Congress at Lincoln Center in New York, Brooks made a pilgrimage to the 9-11 Memorial, where close to 3000 people lost their lives. Deeply moved, she was inspired to honor them with a musical memorial through the 18th Century English hymn 'Amazing Grace'. She approached Mutli-Grammy® winning jazz composer John Beasley to transform that aural vision into reality. As Goldmine Magazine has said, "this is your 2025 Grammy-winning Jazz Vocal of the year- it is Jazz's magnum opus for this year".

On June 5th, 2026, Brooks released her sixth album entitled Soliloquy. Having composed four of the tracks, the album also features songs written by Sting, Tom Waits, Mal Waldron, and Moose Charlap / Don George. As stated by C. Michael Baily, "Soliloquy approaches a watershed moment in Sylvia Brooks' discography, representing the full harmonization of her dual identities as a consummate actress and a probing jazz vocalist. By stripping cinematic veneer of her earlier noir periods, Brooks does not diminish her dramatic impact; rather, she intensifies it, delivering an essay on human resilience that is as intellectually rigorous as it is emotionally arresting", comparing her work to that of Nina Simone and Abbey Lincoln. "It is a worthy addition to the modern vocal jazz canon, charging Brooks' legacy not merely as an interpreter of song, but as an effective chronicler of the human condition."

== Early Life ==
Born in Miami Beach, Florida, Sylvia Brooks was born Sylvia Victoria Ippolito.

Her father, Don Ippolito, was a jazz pianist who has played with various other icons such as Ira Sullivan, Buddy Rich, Peggy Lee, and Dizzie Gillespie, and her mother, Johanna Dordick, was an opera singer who founded the Los Angeles Opera Theatre. After her studies, she moved to New York, and started working in the theatre. It was a fall after returning from playing Anita in West Side Story that ended her career in New York. She relocated to Los Angeles and began working in Episodic Television, but when her father died, while going through his archives, she realized she wanted to return to her roots in Jazz.
