= The Prisoner (album) =

Studio album by Herbie Hancock
- Released: January 1970
- Recorded: April 18, 21 & 23, 1969
- Studio: Van Gelder Studio, Englewood Cliffs
- Genre: Jazz
- Length: 41:11 original LP
- Label: Blue Note; BST 84321
- Producer: Duke Pearson

Herbie Hancock chronology
Speak Like a Child (1968)	The Prisoner (1970)	Fat Albert Rotunda (1969)

Professional ratings
Review scores
Source	Rating
Allmusic	3/5 stars
DownBeat	5/5 stars
The Penguin Guide to Jazz Recordings	3/4 stars
The Rolling Stone Jazz Record Guide	4/5 stars

The Prisoner is the seventh Herbie Hancock album, recorded in 1969 and released in January 1970 for the Blue Note label, his final project for the label before moving to Warner Bros. Records. It is dedicated to the memory of Dr. Martin Luther King Jr., who had been assassinated the previous year. Hancock suggested at the time that he had been able to get closer to his real self with this music than on any other previous album. Participating musicians include tenor saxophonist Joe Henderson, trumpeter Johnny Coles (on flugelhorn), trombonist Garnett Brown, flautist Hubert Laws, bassist Buster Williams and drummer Albert “Tootie” Heath. Hancock praised flute player Laws, suggesting that he was one of the finest flautists in classical or jazz music.

== Composition ==
Like his ambitious Speak Like a Child, The Prisoner purports to stand as a "social statement written in music". The title track seeks to express "how black people have been imprisoned for a long time." The piece was first heard live in 1968, during a performance at the University of California Jazz Festival. "Firewater" represents 'the social duality of the oppressor and the oppressed: the fire symbolises the heat in violence and (abuse of) power, whilst the feeling of water recalls Martin Luther King. "He Who Lives in Fear" also alludes to King, since he "had to live in an atmosphere charged with intimidation". Continuing the album's apparent theme, the "Promise of the Sun" symbolises "how the sun promises life and freedom to all living things, and yet blacks are not yet free."

== Reception ==
Harvey Pekar, writing for DownBeat in a contemporary review, awarded the album a perfect score and praised Hancock as "one of the most creative young jazzmen on the scene today".

== Track listing ==
All compositions by Herbie Hancock, except "Firewater" composed by C. B. Williams.

Side one

1. "I Have a Dream" – 10:58
2. "The Prisoner" – 7:57

Side two

1. "Firewater" – 7:33
2. "He Who Lives in Fear" – 6:51
3. "Promise of the Sun" – 7:52

Bonus tracks on CD reissue

6. "The Prisoner" (alternate take) – 5:47
7. "Firewater" (alternate take) – 8:38

=== Recording dates ===
- April 18, 1969 – tracks 2, 4 and 6
- April 21, 1969 – track 1
- April 23, 1969 – tracks 3, 5 and 7

== Personnel ==
- Herbie Hancock – acoustic piano, electric piano
- Johnny Coles – flugelhorn
- Garnett Brown – trombone
- Joe Henderson – tenor saxophone, alto flute
- Buster Williams – bass
- Tootie Heath – drums
- Tony Studd – bass trombone (1, 2, 4)
- Jack Jeffers – bass trombone (3, 5)
- Hubert Laws – flute (1, 2, 4)
- Jerome Richardson – bass clarinet (1, 2, 4), flute (3, 5)
- Romeo Penque – bass clarinet (3, 5)
