= Speak Like a Child (album) =

Studio album by Herbie Hancock
- Released: October 1968
- Recorded: March 6 and 9, 1968
- Studio: Van Gelder Studio, Englewood Cliffs
- Genre: Hard bop, jazz
- Length: 37:05 original LP
- Label: Blue Note; BST 84279″
- Producer: Duke Pearson

Herbie Hancock chronology
Blow-Up (1966)	Speak Like a Child (1968)	The Prisoner (1969)

Professional ratings
Review scores
Source	Rating
Allmusic	4.5/5 stars
The Rolling Stone Jazz Record Guide	3/5 stars
The Penguin Guide to Jazz Recordings	3/4 stars

Speak Like a Child, the sixth album by American jazz pianist Herbie Hancock, which was recorded and released by Blue Note Records in 1968, features Thad Jones's (uncredited) arrangements of Hancock's compositions for an unusual front line of Jerry Dodgion on alto flute, Peter Phillips on bass trombone, and Thad Jones on flugelhorn. Critic Nat Hentoff described the album as an "impressive further stage in the evolution of Herbie Hancock as writer and player," saying it is characterized by a "singular quality of incisive, searching lyricism." Unusually, none of the wind players perform solos on any song. The rhythm section is bassist Ron Carter and drummer Mickey Roker.

The cover photograph was taken by David Bythewood, an acquaintance of Hancock. The photo depicts Hancock in silhouette kissing his wife-to-be, Gigi Meixner.

== The approach to the album ==
The pianist wanted to represent here a childlike, but not childish, philosophy. He felt this music didn't reflect the social turmoil of the late 1960s in America, that is riots and problematic economy. Hancock rather wanted to picture a more upbeat, brighter future, or, as he says, "a forward look into what could be a bright future." More so, Hancock wanted to go back and rediscover certain childhood qualities "we lose and wish we could have back — purity, spontaneity. When they do return to us, we're at our best." Therefore, "Speak Like a Child" translates as "think and feel in terms of hope, and the possibilities of making our future less impure".

In the liner notes, Hancock further points out his approach to the album, recalling his previous efforts: "What I was into then, and have been thinking about more and more, was the concept that there is a type of music in between jazz and rock." In fact, in 1966 Hancock tried to record a funk album with a nine-piece ensemble — an attempt that failed and never made it to release: "I was trying to make a funk record without knowing a thing about funk." Hancock also referred to himself as a "jazz snob" and stated the date didn't turn out as he expected.

"This album is an extension of Maiden Voyage in terms of use of simple, singable melodies. I've been trying for a long time to work on swinging, and of all the albums I've done, this to me swings the most. [...] What's different in Speak Like a Child as a whole has to do, first, with harmony. For the most part, the harmonies in these numbers are freer in the sense that they're not so easily identifiable chordally in the conventional way. I'm more concerned with sounds than chords, and so I voice the harmonies to provide a wider spectrum of colors that can be contained within the traditional chord progression. [...] Similarly, in those tracks with the horns, I was more interested in sounds than in definite chord patterns. I tried to give the horns notes that would give color and body to the sounds I heard as I wrote." Hancock says this way of thinking partially came from listening to Gil Evans, Oliver Nelson and Thad Jones. Also, the pianist was becoming really captivated by ensembles. Indeed, he concludes saying "certainly, one of the ways I'm going to go from here on is writing for large groups [...] I feel I have to go on and write more for horns, explore more possibilities of textures." More recently, Hancock commented "Once I made that album, there was no doubt in my mind that, when I organized my own band, it would be a sextet."

== Music ==
A different take of "Riot" was recorded originally by Miles Davis on his Nefertiti. Hancock, though, points out that the arranged version on Speak Like a Child is less riotous than Davis'. Moreover, even though it contains "an element of turmoil", it is there "more as an undercurrent than on the surface." Hancock first wrote the melody, then added the harmonies he wanted underneath.

The title for "Speak Like a Child", the haunting title track that represents the summa of this concept album, came from Francis Wolff who designed much art for Blue Note, and it was suggested by the cover photograph taken by Bythewood. Hancock was so enthralled by it that he brought the photo to Wolff for use as the album cover. Wolff in turn was impressed by the naivety and innocence in it, so he promptly chose it as the cover. Miles Davis Quintet attempted to record the piece in January 1968, without producing a proper, finished take.

"First Trip" was composed by bassist Ron Carter for his son, Ron Jr., who at the time was going to a nursery school where the good kids, the ones who behaved well, would come home on the first trip, and the bad ones on the second. Carter clearly wrote the tune one of the days that Ron Jr. behaved well. When Hancock first played the melody, he "didn't play it straight", but rather made changes to some phrases and tempos, so that it would result freer, getting away "from finite structural and chordal limitations." In Hancock's words, the piece has "the kind of progression that goes in and out of the traditional dividing lines." A different version of this number appeared on Joe Henderson' album Tetragon (1967) on which Carter performed.

The tune "Toys", which displays contrasting dynamics, came out since Hancock was trying to write a piece "with the colors of a blues, but not the form," whilst "Goodbye to Childhood" should reflect a melancholic feeling, "that particular quality of sadness you feel at childhood being gone."

The last track on the album is "The Sorcerer", written for Davis. It is also featured on the eponymous Sorcerer. Hancock titled it that way because, in a way, he thought of Miles as "a sorcerer. His whole attitude, the way he is, is kind of mysterious. [...] His music sounds like witchcraft. There are times I don't know where his music comes from. It doesn't sound like he's doing it; it sounds like it's coming from somewhere else."

== Track listing ==
All compositions by Herbie Hancock, except "First Trip" composed by Ron Carter.

Side one

1. "Riot" – 4:40
2. "Speak Like a Child" – 7:50
3. "First Trip" – 6:01

Side two

4. "Toys" – 5:52
5. "Goodbye to Childhood" – 7:06
6. "The Sorcerer" – 5:36

Bonus tracks on CD reissue

7. "Riot" (first alternate take) – 4:55
8. "Riot" (second alternate take) – 4:40
9. "Goodbye to Childhood" (alternate take) – 5:49

=== Recording dates ===
- March 6, 1968 – tracks 1, 2, 3, 7 and 8
- March 9, 1968 – tracks 4, 5, 6 and 9

== Personnel ==
- Herbie Hancock — piano
- Ron Carter — bass
- Mickey Roker — drums
- Jerry Dodgion — alto flute (not on 6)
- Thad Jones — flugelhorn (not on 6)
- Peter Phillips — bass trombone (not on 6)

Technical

- David Bythewood — cover photography

== Charts ==
=== Weekly charts ===
Chart (2024)	Peak position
Croatian International Albums (HDU)	28
