= Round Midnight (soundtrack) =

Soundtrack album by Herbie Hancock
- Released: 1986
- Recorded: July 1–12 and August 20–23, 1985
- Studios: Live at Studio Eclair, Epinay Sur Seine, France, Studio Phillipe Sarde, Paris, France
- Genres: Jazz, hard bop
- Label: Columbia 40464
- Producer: Herbie Hancock

Herbie Hancock chronology
Village Life (1985)	Round Midnight (1986)	Jazz Africa (1987)

Dexter Gordon chronology
American Classic (1982)	Round Midnight (1986)	The Other Side of Round Midnight (1986)

Professional ratings
Review scores
Source	Rating
AllMusic	4/5 stars
The Penguin Guide to Jazz Recordings	3/4 stars

Round Midnight is a soundtrack album by Herbie Hancock featuring music recorded for Bertrand Tavernier's film Round Midnight released in 1986 on Columbia Records. The album features performances by Hancock, trumpeter Freddie Hubbard, bassist Ron Carter, drummer Tony Williams, vocalist Bobby McFerrin, tenor saxophonist Dexter Gordon, bassist Pierre Michelot, drummer Billy Higgins, guitarist John McLaughlin, trumpeter/vocalist Chet Baker, vibraphonist Bobby Hutcherson, saxophonist Wayne Shorter, vocalist Lonette McKee, and pianist Cedar Walton, most of whom appear in the film. It won the Academy Award for Best Music, Original Score in 1986, beating Ennio Morricone's The Mission and Jerry Goldsmith's Hoosiers, among others. Additional music recorded during the making of the film was released under Dexter Gordon's name as The Other Side of Round Midnight (1986).

== Track listing ==
1. "Round Midnight" (Thelonious Monk, Bernie Hanighen, Cootie Williams) – 5.35
2. "Body and Soul" (Edward Heyman, Robert Sour, Frank Eyton, Johnny Green) – 5.54
3. "Bérangère's Nightmare" (Hancock) – 3.06
4. "Fair Weather" (Kenny Dorham) – 6.05
5. "Una Noche con Francis" (Bud Powell) – 4.22
6. "The Peacocks" (Jimmy Rowles) – 7.16
7. "How Long Has This Been Going On?" (Ira Gershwin, George Gershwin) – 3.12
8. "Rhythm-a-Ning" (Monk) – 4.11
9. "Still Time" (Hancock) – 3.50
10. "Minuit aux Champs-Elysées" (Henri Renaud) – 3.26
11. "Chan's Song (Never Said)" (Stevie Wonder, Hancock) – 4.15

- Recorded live at Studio Eclair, Épinay-sur-Seine, France
  Additional recording at Studio Davout and Studio Phillipe Sarde, Paris

== Charts ==
Chart (1987)	Peak position
Australia (Kent Music Report)	74

== Personnel ==
- Herbie Hancock – piano (all tracks except 8)
- Ron Carter – bass (tracks 1, 8 & 11)
- Tony Williams – drums (1, 8 & 11)
- Bobby McFerrin – vocal (1 & 11)
- Dexter Gordon – tenor saxophone (2, 5, 7–8), soprano saxophone (9)
- Pierre Michelot – bass (2–7 & 9)
- Billy Higgins – drums (2–7 & 9)
- John McLaughlin – guitar (2 & 3)
- Chet Baker – vocal & trumpet (4)
- Wayne Shorter – tenor saxophone (5), soprano saxophone (6)
- Bobby Hutcherson – vibes (5 & 10)
- Lonette McKee – vocal (7)
- Freddie Hubbard – trumpet (8)
- Cedar Walton – piano (8)

== Oscar win ==
The awarding of the Oscar for Best Original Score to Round Midnight has been considered one of the most controversial wins in that category, beating out James Horner's score for Aliens, Jerry Goldsmith's score to Hoosiers and Ennio Morricone's score for The Mission. In his review of the score for Hoosiers, Christian Clemmensen of Filmtracks.com stated: 'The awarding of the original score Oscar for 1986 to Herbie Hancock for Round Midnight is considered one of the greatest of the many injustices that have befallen nominees for that category. Ennio Morricone and, to a lesser extent, James Horner were worthy of recognition that year, though Goldsmith's Hoosiers stands in a class of its own because of its immense, counterintuitive impact on the picture.' Morricone, who had never won a competitive Oscar at the time, said in an interview: 'I definitely felt that I should have won for The Mission, especially when you consider that the Oscar-winner that year was Round Midnight, which was not an original score. It had a very good arrangement by Herbie Hancock, but it used existing pieces. So there could be no comparison with The Mission. There was a theft!'.

== Other versions ==
- Stan Getz recorded a version of "The Peacocks" on the 1975 jazz album The Peacocks.
- In 1997, jazz trombonist Harry Watters released a tribute to George Gershwin called S'Wonderful: The Music of George Gershwin, which features a version of "How Long Has This Been Going On?".
- Christian McBride, Nicholas Payton, and Mark Whitfield recorded a version of "Chan's Song" in their tribute album to Herbie Hancock called Fingerpainting: The Music of Herbie Hancock.
