= Sound-System (album) =

Studio album by Herbie Hancock
- Released: August 20, 1984
- Recorded: October–December 1983
- Studio: Evergreen Studios (New York City, NY); Studio Media (Evanston, IL); El Dorado Studios and Garage Sale Recording (Los Angeles, CA)
- Genre: Electro-funk
- Length: 33:42
- Label: Columbia
- Producer: Bill Laswell/Material; Herbie Hancock

Herbie Hancock chronology
Future Shock (1983)	Sound-System (1984)	Village Life (1985)

Sound-System is the thirtieth album by jazz pianist Herbie Hancock and the second of three albums co-produced by Bill Laswell with the ‘Rockit’ Band. Guest artists include saxophonist Wayne Shorter, guitarist Henry Kaiser, kora player/percussionist Foday Musa Suso and drummer Anton Fier.

== Background ==
The second of the three Rockit band albums, Sound-System was another smash for Herbie Hancock. Winning his second Grammy award for Best R&B Performance (his second-straight award), this album tried to capture the success of the previous Future Shock, with some more twists and turns.

"Junku" for instance, featured Foday Musa Suso and also was written for the 1984 Summer Olympics in Los Angeles. It served as the "Field" theme. It also was used during Hancock's appearance on the long-running NBC sketch comedy Saturday Night Live.

"Sound System" sounded like "Junku" in many ways, while "Karabali" features Wayne Shorter on soprano saxophone and evokes Hancock's African themed Mwandishi band from the early 1970s.

== Reception ==
Professional ratings
Review scores
Source	Rating
All About Jazz	Favorable
AllMusic	3/5 stars
Robert Christgau	A−
Tom Hull	B
The Penguin Guide to Jazz Recordings	2.5/4 stars
The Rolling Stone Jazz Record Guide	2/5 stars
The Washington Post	Favorable

Robert Christgau commented "Future Shock was a pretty good album despite its dink quotient; this is a better album despite its schlock quotient. Where's-the-melody is beside the point, because even when they're just hooks the melodies seem a little obvious, without the physical or intellectual bite of the rhythm tracks (nowhere mightier than on the amazing "Metal Beat," recommended to those who think Trevor Horn is into something heavy). And me, I doubt Herbie should be playing more "jazz"—several of the false moments here are provided by Saint Wayne Shorter himself. The African exotica of Foday Musa Suso and Aiyb Dieng, on the other hand, sounds right at home. As does the South Bronx exotica of D.St." Richard S. Ginell of AllMusic noted "In the grand tradition of sequels, Sound-System picks up from where Future Shock left off – if anything, even louder and more bleakly industrial than before ... Hancock's electric music still retained its adventurous edge.

== Track listing ==
1. "Hardrock" (Herbie Hancock, Bill Laswell, Derek Showard) – 6:08
2. "Metal Beat" (Herbie Hancock, Bill Laswell) – 4:53
3. "Karabali" (Herbie Hancock, Daniel Poncé) – 5:17
4. "Junku" (Herbie Hancock, Bill Laswell, Foday Musa Suso, Aiyb Dieng) – 5:30
5. "People are Changing" (Timmy Thomas) – 6:03
6. "Sound System" (Herbie Hancock, Bill Laswell, Foday Musa Suso) – 5:51

Bonus track from CD reissue

7. "Metal Beat (Extended Version)" (Herbie Hancock, Bill Laswell) – 6:44

== Personnel ==
=== Musicians ===
- Herbie Hancock – Yamaha DX7 (1, 2, 4, 5, 6), Fairlight CMI (1–4, 6), Rhodes Chroma (1, 4), E-mu 4060 digital keyboard (1), Apple IIe computer (1), acoustic piano (3, 4, 5), Memorymoog (4), clavinet (6)
- Will Alexander – Fairlight CMI programming (1, 2, 3, 6)
- Rob Stevens – synthesizers (1, 4), programming (4)
- D.S.T. – turntables (1, 2, 6), sound effects (1, 2, 6)
- Henry Kaiser – guitar (1, 2)
- Nicky Skopelitis – guitar (1, 6)
- Bill Laswell – electric bass (1, 4, 6), Oberheim DMX (1, 2, 4, 6), tapes (1, 4), shortwave electronics (2)
- Anton Fier – Simmons drums (1, 2, 6), percussion (1, 2, 6), cymbals (2), Synare (6), timpani (6)
- Daniel Poncé – assorted percussion (1, 3)
- Aïyb Dieng – assorted percussion (2, 4, 5, 6), Roland TR-808 (5)
- Foday Musa Suso – assorted percussion (2, 6), dusunguni (2, 4), balafon (2), kora (4, 6), kalimba (4), guitar (6)
- Hamid Drake – cymbals (3)
- Wayne Shorter – lyricon (2), soprano saxophone (3)
- Bernard Fowler – voice (2), vocals (3, 5), vocal arrangements (3, 5)
- Toshinori Kondo – speaking voice (2), trumpet (6)

=== Production ===
- Herbie Hancock – producer
- Bill Laswell – producer
- Material – producers
- Tony Meilandt – associate producer
- Rob Stevens – engineer, recording
- Lawrence A. Duhart – engineer
- Billy Youdelman – engineer
- Carolyn Collins – assistant engineer
- Sam Fishkin – assistant engineer
- Haun Rowe – assistant engineer
- Lothar Segeler – assistant engineer
- Dave Jerden – mixing
- Howie Weinberg – mastering
- David Em – cover image artwork
- Norman Seeff – photography

Studios

- Recorded at Evergreen Studios (New York City, NY); Studio Media (Evanston, IL); El Dorado Studios and Garage Sale Recording (Los Angeles, CA).
- Mixed at El Dorado Studios (Los Angeles, CA).
- Mastered at Masterdisk (New York City, NY).
