= Foday Musa Suso =

Gambian griot and kora player musician (1950–2025)

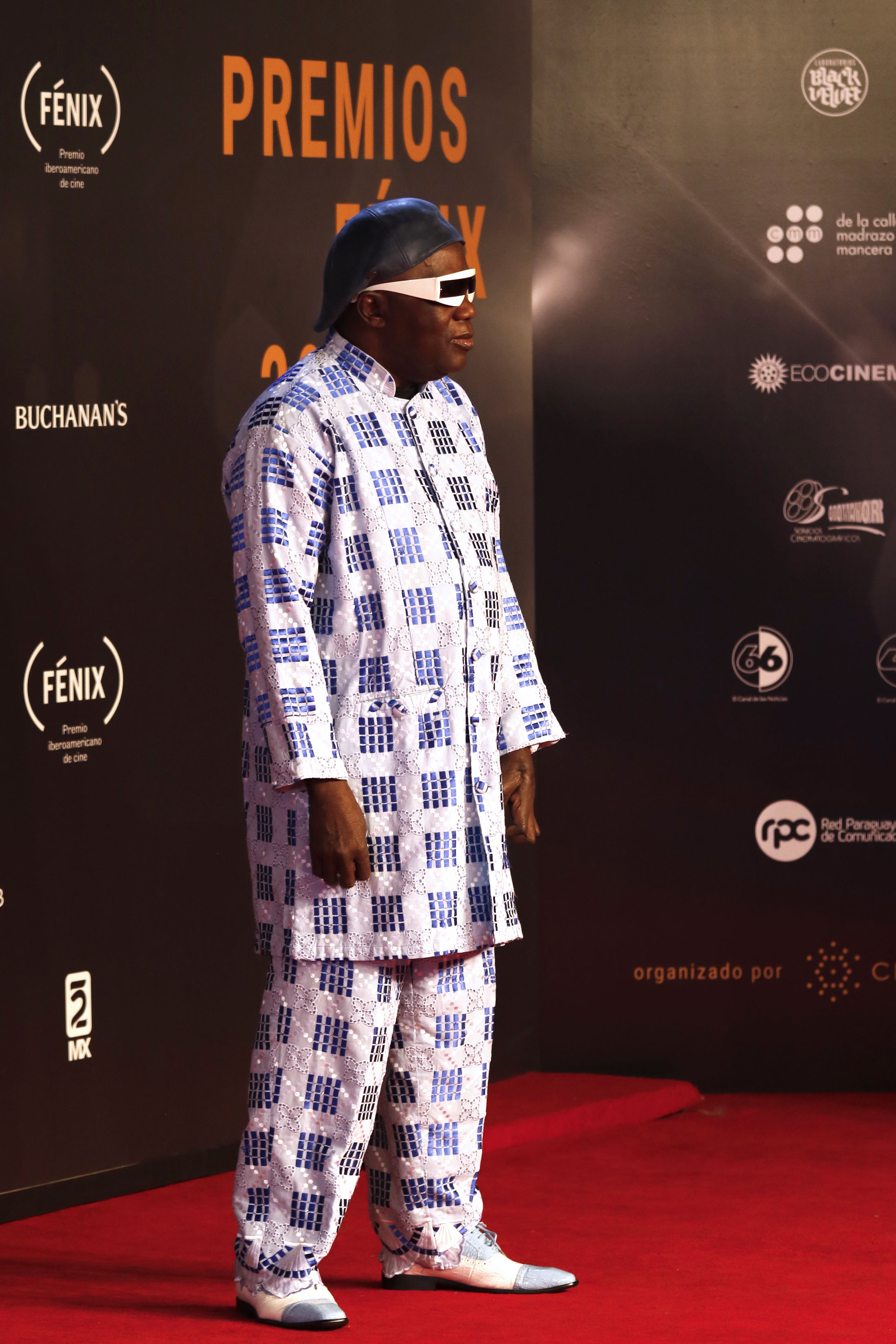
Foday Musa Suso in 2017

Foday Musa Suso (18 February 1950 – 25 May 2025) was a Gambian musician and composer.

== Biography ==
Suso was born on 18 February 1950. He was a member of the Mandinka ethnic group and was a griot. Griots are the oral historians and musicians of the Mandingo people who live in several west African nations. Griots are a living library for the community providing history, entertainment, and wisdom while playing and singing their songs. It is an extensive verbal and musical heritage that can only be passed down within a griot family.

He was a direct descendant of Jali Madi Wlen Suso, the griot who invented the kora over four centuries ago. He spent his childhood in a traditional Gambian village, in a household filled with kora music. Though his father was a master kora player, in griot tradition, a father does not teach his own children the instrument. When Foday was nine, his father sent him to live with master kora teacher Sekou Suso in the village of Pasamasi, Wuli District. He trained with Sekou Suso until the age of 18. Suso's primary instrument was the kora, but he also played the gravikord and several other instruments.

Suso emigrated to Chicago, Illinois, United States in 1977, being one of the first jalis to relocate to North America. Once in Chicago, he formed the Mandingo Griot Society with local percussionists Hamid Drake and Adam Rudolph, which played fusion music around the world. He had performed with Bill Laswell, Philip Glass, Pharoah Sanders, Jack DeJohnette, Ginger Baker, Paul Simon, Yousif Sheronick, and the Kronos Quartet (Pieces of Africa). He had contributed to music for the Olympic Games in 1984 and 2004.

His electrified kora can also be heard on several tracks on Herbie Hancock's 1984 electro-funk album Sound-System. The following year, Suso and Hancock came out with another album, Village Life, that consists entirely of duets between them, Hancock on synthesizer and Suso on kora, talking drums, and vocals.

Suso died on 25 May 2025, at the age of 75.

== Discography ==
- 1970 – Kora Music from Gambia (Folkways)
- 1979 – Mandingo Griot Society: Mandingo Griot Society (Flying Fish)
- 1982 – Mandingo Griot Society: Mighty Rhythm (Flying Fish)
- 1984 – Hand Power (Flying Fish)
- 1984 – Mandingo Featuring Foday Musa Suso: Watto Sitta (Celluloid), produced by Bill Laswell
- 1984 – Herbie Hancock: Sound-System (Columbia), guest appearances
- 1985 – with Herbie Hancock: Village Life (Columbia)
- 1986 – Mansa Bendung (Flying Fish)
- 1988 – The Dreamtime (CMP), solo recording produced by Bill Laswell
- 1985 – with Herbie Hancock: Jazz Africa (Verve)
- 1992 – with Philip Glass: Music from "The Screens" (POINT Music)
- 1995 – with Possession & African Dub: Off World One (Sub Meta), produced by Bill Laswell, FMS plays balaphone
- 1996 – with Pharoah Sanders: Message from Home (Verve), guest appearance
- 2005 – with Jack DeJohnette: Music from the Hearts of the Masters (Golden Beams)
- 2005 – with Jack DeJohnette's The Ripple Effect: Hybrids (Golden Beams)
- 2008 – The Two Worlds (Orange Mountain Music)
- 2012 – with Gretchen Rowe: Koralations: Heart to Heart (African Kora meets American Poetry)

== Sources ==
- Jali Kunda: Griots of West Africa & Beyond (1996). Book and CD set. Ellipsis Arts
