= Perfect Machine =

Studio album by Herbie Hancock
- Released: May 17, 1988
- Recorded: 1988
- Studios: Garage Sale, Los Angeles; OAO Studios, Quad Studios, RPM Studios, New York
- Genre: Electro-funk
- Length: 36:10
- Label: Columbia
- Producers: Herbie Hancock, Bill Laswell

Herbie Hancock chronology
Jazz Africa (1987)	Perfect Machine (1988)	A Tribute to Miles (1994)

Professional ratings
Review scores
Source	Rating
AllMusic	2.5/5 stars
Robert Christgau	C+
The Penguin Guide to Jazz Recordings	2.5/4 stars

Perfect Machine is the thirty-second album by jazz pianist Herbie Hancock. It was the third and final album in Hancock's series co-produced by Bill Laswell. Guests include bassist Bootsy Collins.

== Background ==
The album was produced with Bill Laswell and performed with Bootsy Collins, Leroy "Sugarfoot" Bonner of the Ohio Players, and Grand Mixer DXT. It marked the end of his "Rockit" phase in the 1980s. Richard S. Ginnell at AllMusic called the album "mostly thumping, funk-drenched techno-pop".

== Track listing ==
All songs by Hancock, Laswell, Collins and Bonner, except where noted.

1. "Perfect Machine" (Hancock, Laswell, Skopelitis) - 6:35
2. "Obsession" - 5:20
3. "Vibe Alive" (Hancock, Laswell, Collins, Bonner, Mico Wave) - 5:26
4. "Beat Wise" - 5:52
5. "Maiden Voyage/P. Bop" - 6:34
6. "Chemical Residue" (Hancock) - 6:01

== Personnel ==
Musicians

- Herbie Hancock – piano, Fairlight CMI Series I & II, Roland Super Jupiter, Rhodes Chroma, Macintosh Plus, Yamaha DX1, Yamaha DX7 and DX7IIFD, Kurzweil K250, Yamaha TX816, Oberheim Matrix–12, Akai S900, vocoder
- Jeff Bova, Pete Sturge – synth programming
- Bootsy Collins – bass guitar, vocoder
- Mico Wave – Minimoog bass, talk box, vocoder
- Pete Sturge – keyboards, samples and editing
- Nicky Skopelitis – Fairlight drums
- Grand Mixer DXT – turntables, sound effects
- Leroy "Sugarfoot" Bonner – vocals

Production

- Herbie Hancock – producer
- Bill Laswell – producer
- Tony Meilandt – associate producer
- Martin Bisi, Mike Krowiak, Dave Jerden, Billy Yodelman, Bryan Bell – engineers
- Dave Jerden – mixing
- Howie Weinberg – mastering
