= The Essential Herbie Hancock =

Greatest hits album by Herbie Hancock
- Released: 2006
- Recorded: 1962–1998
- Genre: Jazz, jazz fusion, R&B, acid jazz
- Label: Columbia

Herbie Hancock chronology
Possibilities (2005)	The Essential Herbie Hancock (2006)	River: The Joni Letters (2007)

Professional ratings
Review scores
Source	Rating
AllMusic	4/5 stars
Tom Hull	B+

The Essential Herbie Hancock is the forty-sixth album by American jazz musician and pianist Herbie Hancock. It is part of Sony BMG's The Essential series. Unlike the box set The Herbie Hancock Box, this two-disc set is the first compilation of Hancock's music that included music from all the various recording labels for which Hancock recorded.

== Track listing ==
=== Disc one ===
No.	Title	Length
1.	"Watermelon Man" (from Takin' Off, 1962)	7:12
2.	"'Round Midnight" (from the Sonny Rollins album Now's the Time, 1964)	4:03
3.	"Cantaloupe Island" (from Empyrean Isles, 1964)	5:30
4.	"Maiden Voyage" (from Maiden Voyage, 1965)	7:55
5.	"Circle" (from the Miles Davis Quintet album Miles Smiles, 1967)	5:48
6.	"The Sorcerer" (from Speak Like a Child, 1968)	5:38
7.	"Tell Me a Bedtime Story" (from Fat Albert Rotunda, 1970)	5:01
8.	"Hidden Shadows" (from Sextant, 1973)	10:11
9.	"Chameleon" (from Head Hunters, 1973)	15:41
10.	"Joanna's Theme" (from Death Wish, 1974)	4:43

=== Disc two ===
No.	Title	Length
1.	"Butterfly" (from Thrust, 1974)	11:17
2.	"People Music" (from Secrets, 1976)	7:08
3.	"Milestones" (from Herbie Hancock Trio, 1977)	6:37
4.	"4 AM" (from Mr. Hands, 1980)	5:22
5.	"Come Running To Me" (from Sunlight, 1978)	8:24
6.	"Finger Painting" (from the V.S.O.P. album Five Stars, 1979)	6:42
7.	"Stars In Your Eyes" (from Monster, 1980)	7:05
8.	"Rockit" (from Future Shock, 1983)	5:24
9.	"St. Louis Blues" (from Gershwin's World, 1998)	5:50
10.	"Manhattan (Island of Lights and Love)" (from The New Standard, 1996)	4:04
