= Butterfly (Kimiko Kasai album) =

Studio album by Kimiko Kasai with Herbie Hancock
- Released: 1979
- Recorded: October 1979
- Studio: CBS/Sony Studio, Tokyo
- Genre: Jazz-funk
- Label: CBS/Sony
- Producer: David Rubinson and Herbie Hancock

Professional ratings
Review scores
Source	Rating
All About Jazz	4/5 stars

Butterfly is a studio album by Kimiko Kasai with Herbie Hancock, originally released only in Japan in 1979. This is the only vocal collection album of Hancock's compositions, including six tracks, with accompaniment by Hancock's regular group. The title track "Butterfly" makes an appearance following the original album Thrust (1974), and this is also a vocal version. In 2018, this album was reissued in the UK from Be With Records.

== Track listing ==
Side one
No.	Title	Writer(s)	Length
1.	"I Thought It Was You"	H. Hancock, Melvin M. Ragin, Jeffrey E. Cohen	7:10
2.	"Tell Me A Bedtime Story" (lyrics by Jean Hancock)	H. Hancock	5:11
3.	"Head In The Clouds"	D. Graselli, M. Malanet	3:40
4.	"Maiden Voyage" (lyrics by Jean Hancock)	H. Hancock	7:25

Side two
No.	Title	Writer(s)	Length
5.	"Harvest Time" (lyrics by Jean Hancock)	H. Hancock	4:55
6.	"Sunlight"	H. Hancock	6:15
7.	"Butterfly" (arranged by Jacques Burvick, lyrics by Jean Hancock)	H. Hancock, Bennie Maupin	6:13
8.	"As"	Stevie Wonder	6:16

== Personnel ==
- Kimiko Kasai - vocals
- Herbie Hancock - keyboards, synthesisers, vocoder
- Webster Lewis - organ, synthesizers
- Bennie Maupin - soprano saxophone, tenor saxophone
- Ray Obiedo - guitar
- Paul Jackson - bass
- Alphonse Mouzon - drums
- Bill Summers - percussion
