= Directstep =

Studio album by Herbie Hancock
- Released: January 21, 1979
- Recorded: October 17–18, 1978
- Genre: Electronic, jazz fusion
- Length: 30:30
- Label: CBS/Sony
- Producer: David Rubinson & Friends, Inc.

Herbie Hancock chronology
| An Evening with Herbie Hancock & Chick Corea: In Concert (1978) | Directstep (1979) | Feets, Don't Fail Me Now (1979) |

Professional ratings
Review scores
| Source | Rating |
|---|---|
| Allmusic | 4/5 stars |

Directstep is the twentieth studio album by jazz pianist Herbie Hancock. The record was released exclusively in Japan on January 21, 1979, via the Japanese CBS/Sony label. Participating musicians include saxophonist Bennie Maupin, keyboardist Webster Lewis, bass guitarist Paul Jackson, guitarist Ray Obiedo, percussionist Bill Summers, and drummer Alphonse Mouzon.

== Overview ==
Directstep, released only in Japan, was one of the earliest albums ever released on CD. Webster Lewis became second keyboardist on this album in order for Hancock to handle the multiple layers of electronic texture that he hoped to achieve. Hancock re-recorded "I Thought It Was You" (originally on Sunlight), making it even more electronic with his vocoding. "Butterfly" was also re-recorded (originally on Thrust) making Directstep the second album after the original version (the first being Flood), to have a rendition of "Butterfly". (The fourth would be Dis Is da Drum and the tune is also featured on Kimiko Kasai's LP, Butterfly, which Herbie plays on.) "Shiftless Shuffle" would later be re-recorded for 1980's Mr. Hands.

== Track listing ==
CBS/Sony – 38DP 39

| No. | Title | Writer(s) | Length |
|---|---|---|---|
| 1. | "Butterfly" | Herbie Hancock, Bennie Maupin | 7:53 |
| 2. | "Shiftless Shuffle" | Herbie Hancock, Paul Jackson, Harvey Mason, Bill Summers | 7:10 |
| 3. | "I Thought It Was You" | Jeffrey Cohen, Herbie Hancock, Melvin Ragin | 15:27 |
| Total length: | | | 30:30 |

== Personnel ==
- Herbie Hancock - Fender Rhodes, clavinet; Oberheim, Prophet, Yamaha CS-80 and Minimoog synthesizers; vocals, Sennheiser Vocoder
- Webster Lewis - Hammond B-3 organ; Prophet, Yamaha CS-40, ARP String Ensemble and Minimoog synthesizers; Fender Rhodes, backing vocals
- Bennie Maupin - soprano saxophone, tenor saxophone, lyricon
- Ray Obiedo - electric guitar
- Paul Jackson - electric bass
- Alphonse Mouzon - drums
- Bill Summers - percussion
