= Dis Is da Drum =

Studio album by Herbie Hancock
- Released: October 26, 1994
- Recorded: 1993–1994
- Studios: Garage Sale Studios and Studio 55, Los Angeles, CA
- Genres: Jazz rap; acid jazz; hip-hop
- Length: 54:59
- Label: Mercury
- Producers: Herbie Hancock, Bill Summers a.o.

Herbie Hancock chronology
A Tribute to Miles (1994)	Dis Is da Drum (1994)	The New Standard (1996)

Professional ratings
Review scores
Source	Rating
AllMusic	4/5 stars
Robert Christgau	(neither)
The Penguin Guide to Jazz Recordings	3/4 stars
Rolling Stone	2/5 stars

Dis Is da Drum is Herbie Hancock's thirty-fourth album and his first solo album since leaving Columbia Records. Guests include saxophonist Bennie Maupin, trumpeter Wallace Roney and flautist Hubert Laws.

Tracks like "Bo Ba Be Da" and "Dis Is da Drum" reflect Hancock's move towards acid jazz, while "Butterfly" makes a fifth appearance on a Hancock album following the original album (Thrust), Kimiko Kasai's album (Butterfly), a live album (Flood), and another studio album (Direct Step). The music video for the title track, directed by Mark Dippé, received a Grammy nomination for Best Music Video, Short Form.

== Track listing ==
No.	Title	Writer(s)	Length
1.	"Call It 95"	Griffin, Hancock, Robertson, Smith, Summers	4:39
2.	"Dis Is da Drum"	Griffin, Hancock, Lasar, Robertson, Summers	4:49
3.	"Shooz"	Griffin, Moreira, Summers	1:17
4.	"Melody (On the Deuce by 44)"	Factor, Griffin, Robertson, Smith	4:05
5.	"Mojuba"	Galarraga, Griffin, Hancock, Lasar, Robertson, Summers	4:59
6.	"Butterfly"	Hancock, Maupin	6:08
7.	"Juju"	Galarraga, Griffin, Lasar, Summers	5:03
8.	"Hump"	Maupin, Roney, Shanklin	4:43
9.	"Come and See Me"	Hancock, Smith, Watson	4:32
10.	"Rubber Soul"	Griffin, Hancock, Robertson, Smith, Summers	6:40
11.	"Bo Ba Be Da"	Hancock, Watson	8:04

Bonus track
No.	Title	Writer(s)	Length
12.	"Butterfly" (Remix)	Hancock, Maupin	6:01

== Personnel ==
- Herbie Hancock – piano (exc. 2, 3, 7), Minimoog and synthesizer (2, 5, 7, 8, 10, 11), clavinet (2, 5, 10, 11), synthesizer bass (2, 11), background vocals (4)
- Bill Summers – percussion (exc. 4, 7), bata (7)
- Will "Roc" Griffin – drum loops, sequencing (exc. 5, 7), sampling (exc. 5, 7, 9), programming (5, 7, 10, 11), rap (4)
- Darrell Smith – keyboards (1, 2, 8), sequencing (2, 8, 9, 10), electric piano (3, 4, 11), clavinet (3, 7), Minimoog (3), background vocals (4), programming (5–10), synthesizer (5, 9)
- Darrell "Bob Dog" Robertson – guitar (exc. 3, 6, 9), background vocals (4)

with

- Wah Wah Watson – guitar (1, 2, 8–11), vocals and sequencing (9)
- Mars Lasar – keyboards and sound design (1, 4, 6, 10–11)
- Wallace Roney – trumpet (1, 8, 10–11)
- Bennie Maupin – tenor saxophone (1, 8, 10–11)
- Lázaro Galarraga – vocals (2, 7), bata and vocal arrangement (7)
- Marina Bambino, Felicidad Ector, Lynn Lindsey, Yvette Summers, Louis Verdeaux – background vocals (2, 11)
- Huey Jackson – background vocals (2, 7, 11)
- Armand Sabal Lecco – bass guitar (8, 10)
- Ken Strong – drums (1, 2, 6–11)
- William Kennedy – drums (1, 7, 11)
- Frank Thibeaux – bass guitar (1)
- Niayi Asiedu – percussion (1)
- Doug Scott – additional editing (2)
- Airto Moreira – percussion (3)
- Chill Factor – rap (4)
- The Real Richie Rich – DJ and scratcher (4)
- Francis Awe – vocals (5)
- Guy Eckstine – drums (5)
- Munyungo Jackson and Skip Burney – djembe (5)
- Hubert Laws – flute (6)
- Nengue Hernandez – background vocals (7)
- Nengue Hernandez – bata (7)
- Jay Shanklin – bass and add. sequencing (8)
- Brady Speller – percussion (11)

Rhythm arrangements credited to (as far as they are not identical to the writers credits)

- "The Melody" – Darrell Smith, Will "Roc" Griffin
- "Butterfly" – Bill Summers, Herbie Hancock, Mars Lasar
- "Hump" – Bill Summers, Darrell "Bob Dog" Robertson, Darrell Smith, Jay Shanklin
- "Rubber Soul" – Bill Summers, Herbie Hancock, Wah Wah Watson, Will "Roc" Griffin
- "Bo Ba Be Da" – Darrell Smith, Herbie Hancock

Production, recording and mix by Bill Summers and Herbie Hancock with Darrell Robertson, Darrell Smith, Will Griffin.

- Additional co-producer (6), additional engineer (1, 6, 10, 11) – Mars Lasar
- Chief engineers – Darrell "Bob Dog" Robertson, Darrell Smith
- Additional recordings at Studio 55 by Michael Schlessinger assisted by Darrell Roamer
- Mastering – "Big Bass" Brian Gardner
- Executive-Producer – Guy Eckstine

== In popular culture ==
The track 'Call it 95' is the main theme for the Australian political talk show Insiders on ABC TV.
