= An Evening with Herbie Hancock & Chick Corea: In Concert =

Live album by Herbie Hancock & Chick Corea
- Released: November 1978
- Recorded: February 1978
- Venue: Masonic Auditorium, San Francisco; Dorothy Chandler Pavilion, Los Angeles; Golden Hall, San Diego; Hill Auditorium, Ann Arbor
- Genre: Jazz
- Length: 91:04
- Label: Columbia
- Producer: David Rubinson, Herbie Hancock

Herbie Hancock chronology
Sunlight (1978)	An Evening with Herbie Hancock & Chick Corea: In Concert (1978)	Directstep (1979)

Chick Corea chronology
Friends (1978)	An Evening with Herbie Hancock & Chick Corea: In Concert (1978)	Duet (Gary Burton & Chick Corea album) (1979)

Professional ratings
Review scores
Source	Rating
Allmusic	4/5 stars
The Rolling Stone Jazz Record Guide	4/5 stars
DownBeat	4/5 stars

An Evening with Herbie Hancock & Chick Corea: In Concert is a live album compiling several performances from February 1978 and released the same year as a double LP. The album features just Herbie Hancock and Chick Corea playing acoustic pianos. The use of the acoustic instruments comes as a marked departure from both men's favoring of electric keyboards at that time. Hancock received top billing on this album, while Corea was credited first on the album CoreaHancock, another recording from the same tour released by Polydor.

On vinyl, "February Moment" and its introduction are indexed as one track. Moreover, the liner notes state that the sound on the fourth side of the album had to be compressed in order to fit the 13 and a half minute version of "Maiden Voyage" and the nearly 22 minute version of "La Fiesta" on a single side; this preserved the integrity of the performance, but lowered the sound quality. The CD release avoids this issue.

== Track listing ==
=== Side one ===
1. "Someday My Prince Will Come" (Frank Churchill, Larry Morey) – 12:36
2. "Liza (All the Clouds'll Roll Away)" (George Gershwin, Gus Kahn) – 8:56

=== Side two ===
1. "Button Up" (Corea, Hancock) – 17:33

=== Side three ===
1. "Introduction of Herbie Hancock by Chick Corea" – 0:41
2. "February Moment" (Hancock) – 15:50

=== Side four ===
1. "Maiden Voyage" (Hancock) – 13:30
2. "La Fiesta" (Corea) – 21:58

== Personnel ==
- Herbie Hancock – Piano, left channel
- Chick Corea – Piano, right channel

== Chart performance ==
Year	Chart	Position
1979	Billboard Jazz Albums	8
1979	Billboard 200	100
