= Magic Windows =

Studio album by Herbie Hancock
- Released: September 29, 1981
- Recorded: 1981
- Studio: The Automatt, San Francisco. Additional recording at Kendun Recording; Village Recorders; Ameraycan Studios, L.A.
- Genre: Jazz-funk, jazz fusion, R&B
- Length: 42:39
- Label: Columbia
- Producer: Herbie Hancock, David Rubinson

Herbie Hancock chronology
Mr. Hands (1980)	Magic Windows (1981)	Herbie Hancock Trio (1982)

Professional ratings
Review scores
Source	Rating
AllMusic	2.5/5 stars
The Penguin Guide to Jazz Recordings	2/4 stars
The Rolling Stone Jazz Record Guide	1/5 stars

Magic Windows is the twenty-fifth album by jazz pianist Herbie Hancock, released on September 29, 1981, on Columbia Records. The album peaked at No. 13 on the US Billboard Top Jazz LPs chart.

== Background ==
Hancock continued collaborating with associate producer Jeffrey Cohen on this album. A song called "Satisfied with Love" was also co-written by his sister, Jean Hancock. Artists such as Wah-Wah Watson, Louis Johnson, Ray Parker Jr., Al McKay, Adrian Belew, Sylvester, Sheila E. and Paulinho da Costa appeared on the record.

== Track listing ==
1. "Magic Number" (David Rubinson, Hancock, Jeffrey Cohen) – 7:24
2. "Tonight's the Night" (Hancock, Jeffrey Cohen, Ray Parker Jr.) – 6:31
3. "Everybody's Broke" (Alphonse Mouzon, Gavin Christopher, Hancock, Jeffrey Cohen) – 7:11
4. "Help Yourself" (David Rubinson, Gavin Christopher, Hancock, Jeffrey Cohen) – 6:43
5. "Satisfied with Love" (Hancock, Jean Hancock) – 6:31
6. "The Twilight Clone" (Adrian Belew, Hancock) – 8:19

== Personnel ==
- Herbie Hancock - E-mu Polyphonic keyboard, E-mu Emulator, clavitar, Minimoog, Prophet 5, Oberheim Eight Voice, Yamaha CS-80, ARP Odyssey, ARP 2600, Hohner clavinet, Rhodes 88 Suitcase piano, Sennheiser, Linn LM-1 drum computer, modified Apple II+ computer, acoustic piano, bass (2), backing vocals (3)
- Michael Brecker - tenor saxophone (2, 4)
- Ray Parker Jr. (1–2), George Johnson (3, 6), Al McKay (4), Wah-Wah Watson (5), Adrian Belew (6) - guitar
- Freddie Washington (1, 5), Louis Johnson (3, 6), Ed Watkins (4) - bass
- John Robinson (1, 3), Ray Parker Jr. (2), James Gadson (4), Alphonse Mouzon (5) - drums
- Kwasi Dzidzornu, Kwawu Ladzekpo, Moody Perry III - bells, Ghanaian drums (6)
- Juan Escovedo, Pete Escovedo, Sheila Escovedo (1), Paulinho da Costa (6) - percussion
- Sylvester (1), Vicki Randle (2), Gavin Christopher (3–5) - lead vocals
- Jeanie Tracy (1), Dede Dickerson, Ngoh Spencer and Vicki Randle (2–4), David Bottom and Jeffrey Cohen (3), Julia, Luther, Maxine and Oren Waters (5) - backing vocals

== See also ==
- Magic Windows at Discogs
- Page describing software for the Alpha Syntauri system
