= David Rubinson =

American music producer (born 1942)

- Born: 7 August 1942 (age 84); Brooklyn, New York, United States
- Occupation: Music producer
- Years active: 1960s - 1990s

David Rubinson (born August 7, 1942 in Brooklyn, New York) is an American recording engineer and music producer, who was particularly involved in music production from the 1960s to the 1980s. He produced such diverse acts as Moby Grape, Herbie Hancock, the Pointer Sisters, Santana, and Taj Mahal. Rubinson also founded The Automatt Recording Studios and was the music producer for the film Apocalypse Now.

== Background ==
David Rubinson was graduated from Columbia University in 1963 with a bachelor's degree in English. He commenced his record production career shortly thereafter, becoming an associate producer at Capitol Records during 1963-1964. Thereafter, he became a staff producer for Columbia Records, a position he held from 1964 to 1969. During that period, he produced recordings by artists such as The Chambers Brothers. Rubinson then went into partnership with Bill Graham, working with the latter in the Fillmore Corporation, and creating two record labels with him: San Francisco Records and Fillmore Records.

It is likely that Rubinson assisted with the discovery of the group Malo which was fronted by Jorge Santana.

== History and Career ==
Rubinson produced the In One Head and Out the Other [The New Emerging Bigot] album by Jack Burns and Avery Schreiber which was released on Columbia CS 9170 in 1965.

In 1967, Betty Mabry heard that the Chambers Brothers were in New York. She had composed a song, "Uptown". She managed to catch them before they went into the studio. She knew that Lester Chambers could sing the song. So, she sang the song to them. According to Lester, they went up to Rubinson and presented the song to him and the song was worked out. With Rubinson as producer, the Chambers Brothers recorded the Mabry composition "Uptown". Backed with a Brian Keenan number, "Love me Like the Rain" it was released on Columbia 44296. By 4 November, it was reported by Billboard that the song was now a regional breakout. It was a minor hit, making it to No. 126 on the Billboard Bubbling Under Hot 100 chart for the week of 18 November.

In 1976, he built The Automatt, the first automated recording studio in San Francisco. After suffering a severe heart attack, Rubinson retired from record production in 1982, thereafter devoting his time to artist management (Narada Michael Walden, Ryuichi Sakamoto, Marcel Marceau, Wayne Shorter) and film. He was the executive producer of Sugihara: Conspiracy of Kindness, a PBS biography of Japanese diplomat Chiune Sugihara, who facilitated the escape of thousands of Jews from Lithuania during World War II. The film won the award for Best Documentary at the 2000 Hollywood Film Festival and the 2001 Pare Lorentz Award, sponsored by the International Documentary Association.

In 2009, Rubinson relocated to France to practice permaculture and sustainable, renewable food production and became a public opponent of the actions of Israel in Gaza. Rubinson hired Scott Hamann to film and document the 2010 flotilla to Gaza and post what he had captured onto the Witness Gaza website.

== Selected discography ==
| Year | Album | Artist | Role |
|---|---|---|---|
| 1966 | Isn't It Grand Boys | The Clancy Brothers and Tommy Makem | Producer |
| 1967 | Tim Rose | Tim Rose | Producer |
| 1967 | Freedom's Sons | The Clancy Brothers and Tommy Makem | Producer |
| 1967 | The Time Has Come | The Chambers Brothers | Producer |
| 1967 | Moby Grape | Moby Grape | Audio Production, Producer |
| 1968 | Wow/Grape Jam | Moby Grape | Audio Production, Orchestral Arrangements, Producer |
| 1968 | The United States of America | The United States of America | Producer |
| 1968 | Taj Mahal | Taj Mahal | Producer |
| 1968 | The Natch'l Blues | Taj Mahal | Producer |
| 1969 | Santana | Santana | Producer (first studio session) |
| 1969 | The Elvin Bishop Group | Elvin Bishop | Original Recording Producer, Producer |
| 1969 | Moby Grape '69 | Moby Grape | Audio Production, Liner Notes, Original Recording Producer, Producer |
| 1969 | Love, Peace and Happiness | The Chambers Brothers | Co-Producer, with Tim O'Brien |
| 1969 | Giant Step/De Ole Folks at Home | Taj Mahal | Photography, Producer |
| 1969 | Cold Blood | Cold Blood | Producer |
| 1969 | Afro-American Latin | Mongo Santamaría | Producer |
| 1969 | Oar | Skip Spence | Liner Notes, Mixing |
| 1970 | Secret of the Bloom | Victoria | Co-Producer with Fred Catero |
| 1970 | Right On Be Free | The Voices of East Harlem | Producer |
| 1970 | Mwandishi | Herbie Hancock | Producer |
| 1970 | Feel It! | Elvin Bishop | Producer |
| 1971 | Victoria | Victoria (Domalgaski) | Co-Producer with Fred Catero |
| 1971 | Happy Just to Be Like I Am | Taj Mahal | Co-Producer, with Taj Mahal |
| 1971 | 20 Granite Creek | Moby Grape | Congas, Engineer, Piano (Electric), Producer |
| 1971 | The Real Thing | Taj Mahal | Producer |
| 1973 | What the Kids Want | Hoodoo Rhythm Devils | Producer |
| 1973 | Thriller! | Cold Blood | Audio Production, Mixing, Producer |
| 1973 | The Pointer Sisters | The Pointer Sisters | Arranger, Engineer, Mixing Engineer, Producer |
| 1973 | Sextant | Herbie Hancock | Producer, Remixing |
| 1973 | Head Hunters | Herbie Hancock | Co-Producer, with Herbie Hancock |
| 1974 | Thrust | Herbie Hancock | Co-Producer, with Herbie Hancock |
| 1974 | That's a Plenty | The Pointer Sisters | Producer, Arranger, Engineer |
| 1974 | Dedication | Herbie Hancock | Producer |
| 1974 | Death Wish | Herbie Hancock | Producer |
| 1975 | Steppin' | The Pointer Sisters | Composer, Producer, Remixing |
| 1975 | Safety Zone | Bobby Womack | Engineer, Producer |
| 1975 | Man-Child | Herbie Hancock | Engineer, Co-Producer, with Herbie Hancock |
| 1975 | Flood | Herbie Hancock | Producer, Remixing |
| 1976 | V.S.O.P, Vol. 1 | Herbie Hancock | Engineer, Producer |
| 1976 | The Quintet | V.S.O.P. | Producer |
| 1976 | Secrets | Herbie Hancock | Engineer, Co-Producer, with Herbie Hancock |
| 1976 | Magical Shepherd | Miroslav Vitouš | Engineer, Producer, Remixing |
| 1976 | It Looks Like Snow | Phoebe Snow | Engineer, Producer |
| 1976 | Chameleon | Labelle | ARP Synthesizer, Arranger, Engineer, Producer |
| 1976 | Amigos | Santana | Audio Production, Composer, Engineer, Producer |
| 1977 | Patti LaBelle | Patti LaBelle | Arranger, Composer, Engineer, Photography, Producer, Vocal Arrangement |
| 1977 | New Directions | The Meters | Engineer, Co-Producer, with Jeffrey Cohen |
| 1977 | Having a Party | The Pointer Sisters | Engineer, Producer |
| 1977 | Festival | Santana | Audio Engineer, Audio Production, Composer, Engineer, Producer |
| 1977 | Elementary | Wah Wah Watson | Engineer, Co-Producer, with Wah Wah Watson |
| 1978 | Sunlight | Herbie Hancock | Engineer, Co-Producer, with Herbie Hancock |
| 1978 | Tropico | Gato Barbieri | Adaptation, Arranger, Engineer, Producer, Unknown Contributor Role |
| 1978 | VSOP: Tempest in the Colosseum | V.S.O.P. | Co-Producer, with Henri Renaud |
| 1978 | Reunion | Peter, Paul and Mary | Producer |
| 1978 | Tasty | Patti LaBelle | Producer, Arranger |
| 1978 | An Evening with Herbie Hancock & Chick Corea: In Concert | Herbie Hancock | Co-Producer, with Herbie Hancock |
| 1979 | Feets, Don't Fail Me Now | Herbie Hancock | Composer, Engineer, Co-Producer, with Herbie Hancock |
| 1979 | Directstep | Herbie Hancock | Engineer, Co-Producer, with Herbie Hancock |
| 1979 | Apocalypse Now (soundtrack) | Carmine Coppola | Producer |
| 1980 | The Swing of Delight | Carlos Santana | Mixing Engineer, Producer |
| 1980 | The Piano | Herbie Hancock | Audio Engineer, Audio Production, Engineer, Liner Notes, Mixing, Co-Producer, with Herbie Hancock, Reissue Producer |
| 1980 | Mr. Hands | Herbie Hancock | Mixing, Co-Producer, with Herbie Hancock |
| 1980 | Monster | Herbie Hancock | Composer, Engineer, Co-Producer, with Herbie Hancock |
| 1980 | Watercolors | The Waters | Producer |
| 1981 | Randy Hansen | Randy Hansen | Producer |
| 1981 | Magic Windows | Herbie Hancock | Composer, Engineer, Mix Down, Co-Producer, with Herbie Hancock |
| 1982 | Quartet | Herbie Hancock | Co-Producer, with Herbie Hancock |
| 1988 | Passion and Fire | Gato Barbieri | Producer |
| 1991 | Stolen Moments | Stanley Jordan | Executive Producer, Management |
