= The Piano (Herbie Hancock album) =

Studio album by Herbie Hancock
- Released: LP: June 21, 1979; CD: 2004
- Recorded: October 25–26, 1978
- Studio: CBS Studios, Tokyo
- Genre: Jazz
- Length: LP: 31:26; CD: 52:04
- Label: LP: CBS/Sony; CD: Columbia
- Producer: David Rubinson; Herbie Hancock

Herbie Hancock chronology
Feets, Don't Fail Me Now (1979)	The Piano (1979)	Monster (1980)

Professional ratings
Review scores
Source	Rating
AllMusic	4/5 stars
Tom Hull	B

The Piano is the twenty-first album by Herbie Hancock.

== About the Album ==
As with Directstep (recorded one week previously), this album was recorded, and originally only released, in Japan. It was one of Hancock's most successful albums in Japan, perhaps because it was entirely solo piano. Hancock tackles jazz standards such as "My Funny Valentine", "On Green Dolphin Street" and "Some Day My Prince Will Come" while also performing four original compositions.

This album was initially released exclusively in Japan and first issued there on CD in 1983. In 2004, over 25 years after its recording, the album was released with four additional alternate takes of the same session. It was the first and only (until 2014) of Hancock's Japanese releases available internationally.

== Track listing ==
- CBS/Sony – 30AP 1033

Side one
No.	Title	Writer(s)	Length
1.	"My Funny Valentine"	Richard Rodgers, Lorenz Hart	7:42
2.	"On Green Dolphin Street"	Bronisław Kaper, Ned Washington	3:20
3.	"Some Day My Prince Will Come"	Frank Churchill, Larry Morey	4:36

Side two
No.	Title	Writer(s)	Length
1.	"Harvest Time"	Herbie Hancock	4:48
2.	"Sonrisa"	Herbie Hancock	3:40
3.	"Manhattan Island"	Herbie Hancock	3:56
4.	"Blue Otani"	Herbie Hancock	3:24
Total length:			31:26

CD Reissue bonus track (Columbia – CK 87083)
No.	Title	Writer(s)	Length
8.	"My Funny Valentine" (Take 3)	Richard Rodgers, Lorenz Hart	6:08
9.	"On Green Dolphin Street" (Take 2)	Bronisław Kaper, Ned Washington	4:04
10.	"Some Day My Prince Will Come" (Take 3)	Frank Churchill, Larry Morey	5:16
11.	"Harvest Time" (Take 3)	Herbie Hancock	5:10
Total length:			52:04

== Personnel ==
- Herbie Hancock – acoustic piano

Production credits

- David Rubinson – producer
- Fred Catero – engineer, mixing
- Mikio Takamatsu – mastering
- Yasohachi "88" Itoh and Keiichi Nakamura – production coordination
- Yusaku Nakanishi – art direction
- Kazumi Kurigami – cover photo
- Akira Aimi – photography
