= Bill Summers (musician) =

American multi-instrumentalist (born 1948)

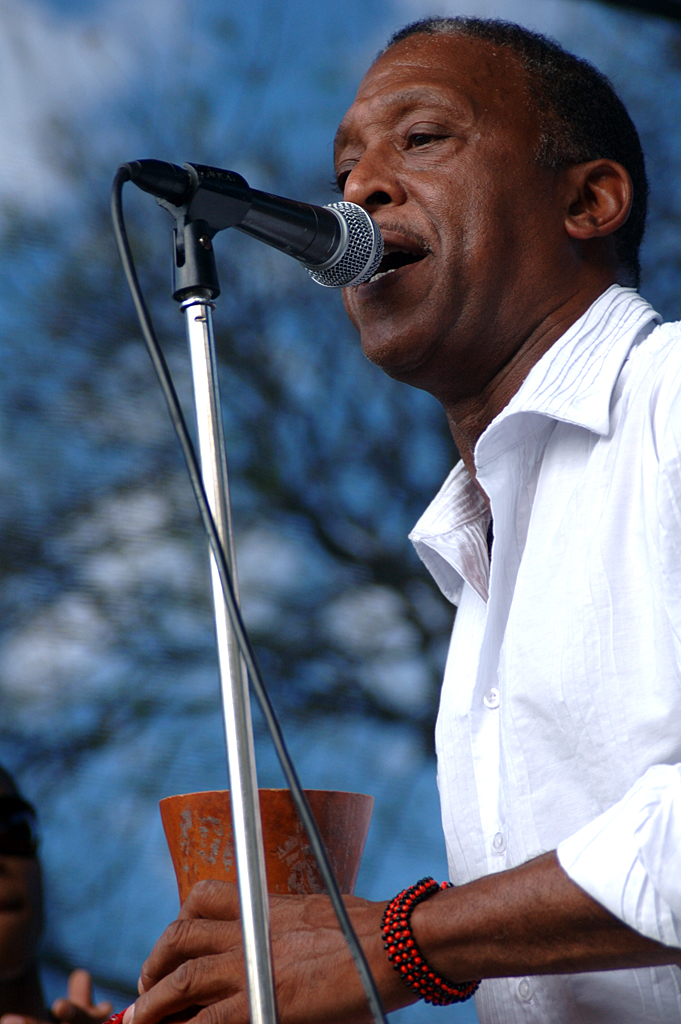

Background information
- Born: June 27, 1948 (age 78); Michigan, U.S.
- Genres: Latin jazz, jazz fusion
- Occupation: Musician
- Instrument: Conga
- Years active: 1970–present
- Labels: Prestige, MCA

Bill Summers (born June 27, 1948) is an American Afro-Cuban jazz/Latin jazz percussionist, a multi-instrumentalist who plays primarily on conga drums.

== Career ==
In the 1970s, he founded Bill Summers & Summers Heat together with Bo Freeman, Calvin Tillery, Carla Vaughn, Claytoven Richardson, Earl Freeman, Freddie Washington, George Spencer, Hadley Caliman, James Levi, Jeff Lewis, Larry Batiste, Leo Miller, Lori Ham, Michael Sasaki, Munyungo Jackson, Paul Van Wageningen, Ray Obiedo, Rodney Franklin, Scott Roberts and Tom Poole. The group produced 7 albums between 1977 and 1983 :

- Cayenne
- Straight to the bank
- On Sunshine
- Jam the box
- Call it what you want
- Seventeen
- London Style

During the 1990s, Summers played with Los Hombres Calientes along with co-leader of the group, trumpeter Irvin Mayfield and Jason Marsalis. However, Summers has a much longer musical career, often working behind the scenes on film scores for various movies such as The Color Purple and the television miniseries Roots with Quincy Jones. He also played with Herbie Hancock during The Headhunters years, and is mentioned in passing by the liner notes of The Headhunters' 2003 release Evolution Revolution as contributing to that recording. His former wife is Yvette Bostic-Summers, who often sings on Los Hombres' albums.

== Discography ==
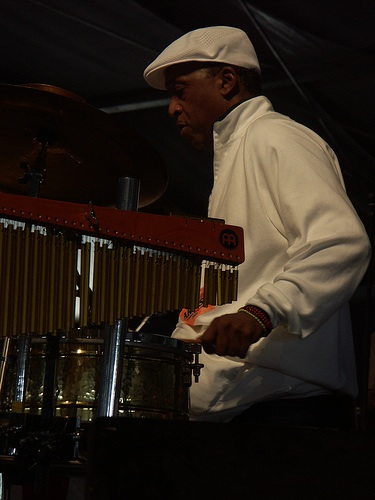
Bill Summers in 2008.

=== As leader ===
- Feel the Heat (Prestige, 1977)
- Cayenne (Prestige, 1977)
- Straight to the Bank (Prestige, 1978)
- On Sunshine (Prestige, 1979)
- Call it What You Want (MCA, 1981) – US No. 129
- Jam the Box (MCA, 1981) – US No. 92
- Seventeen (MCA, 1982)
- London Style (MCA, 1983)
- Iroko (Vital, 1992)
- The Essence of Kwanzaa (Monkey Hill, 1997)
- Studies in Bata: Sacred Drum of the Yoruba, Havana to Matanzas (Bilsum, 2002)

=== As a member ===
The Headhunters

- Survival of the Fittest (Arista, 1975) – US No. 126
- Straight from the Gate (Arista, 1977)
- Return of the Headhunters (Verve Forecast, 1998)
- Evolution Revolution (Basin Street, 2003)
- On Top: Live in Europe (BHM, 2008)
- Platinum (Owl Studios, 2011)

The Zawinul Syndicate

- Lost Tribes (Columbia, 1992)

Los Hombres Calientes

- Los Hombres Calientes (Basin Street, 1998)
- Vol. 2 (Basin Street, 2000)
- Vol. 3 New Congo Square (Basin Street, 2001)
- Vol. 4: Vodou Dance (Basin Street, 2003)

=== As sideman ===
With Gato Barbieri

- Tropico (A&M, 1978)
- Passion and Fire (A&M, 1984)

With Gary Bartz

- Music Is My Sanctuary (Capitol, 1977)
- Love Affair (Capitol, 1978)

With John Beasley

- Cauldron (Windham Hill, 1992)
- A Change of Heart (Windham Hill, 1993)

With Harry Connick Jr.

- Every Man Should Know (Columbia, 2013)
- Smokey Mary (Columbia, 2013)

With Norman Connors

- Love from the Sun (Buddah, 1973)
- Saturday Night Special (Buddah, 1975)

With Johnny Hammond

- Forever Taurus (Milestone, 1976)
- Storm Warning (Milestone, 1977)
- Don't Let the System Get You (Milestone, 1978)

With Herbie Hancock

- Head Hunters (Columbia, 1973)
- Thrust (Columbia, 1974)
- Man-Child (Columbia, 1975)
- Flood (CBS/Sony, 1975)
- Sunlight (Columbia, 1978)
- Directstep (Columbia, 1979)
- Feets, Don't Fail Me Now (Columbia, 1979)
- Mr. Hands (Columbia, 1980)
- Autodrive (Columbia, 1983)
- Dis Is da Drum (Mercury, 1994)
- Omaha Civic Auditorium, 17th November 1975 (Hi Hat, 2015)

With Eddie Henderson

- Inside Out (Capricorn, 1974)
- Mahal (Capitol, 1978)
- Runnin' to Your Love (Capitol, 1979)

With Joe Henderson

- Black Miracle (Milestone, 1976)
- Black Narcissus (Milestone, 1977)

With Quincy Jones

- Roots (A&M, 1977)
- The Color Purple (Qwest, 1985)
- Back on the Block (Qwest, 1989)

With Kimiko Kasai

- Round and Round (CBS/Sony, 1978)
- Butterfly (CBS/Sony, 1979)

With Kenny Loggins

- Leap of Faith (Columbia, 1991)
- The Unimaginable Life (Columbia, 1997)

With David "Fathead" Newman

- Concrete Jungle (Prestige, 1978)
- Keep the Dream Alive (Prestige, 1978)
- Scratch My Back (Prestige, 1979)

With Shawn Phillips

- Rumplestiltskin's Resolve (A&M, 1976)
- Spaced (A&M, 1977)

With The Pointer Sisters

- That's a Plenty (Blue Thumb, 1974)
- Steppin' ABC (Blue Thumb, 1975)

With Dianne Reeves

- Never Too Far (Emi, 1989)
- I Remember (Blue Note, 1991)

With Sonny Rollins

- The Way I Feel (Milestone, 1976)
- Easy Living (Milestone, 1978)
- Don't Ask (Milestone, 1979)
- Love at First Sight (Milestone, 1980)
- Silver City (Milestone, 1996)

With Patrice Rushen

- Shout It Out (Prestige, 1977)
- Patrice (Elektra, 1978)
- Pizzazz (Elektra, 1979)

With Vinx

- Rooms in My Fatha's House (PANGAEA, 1991)
- I Love My Job (PANGAEA, 1992)
- The Storyteller (PANGAEA, 1993)
- Lips' Stretched Out (H.O.E. Heroes of Expression, 1996)
- The Mood I'm In (Peermusic, 2002)

With others

- Bar-Kays, Money Talks (Stax, 1978)
- George Benson, Love Remembers (Warner Bros., 1993)
- Carmen Bradford, With Respect (Evidence, 1995)
- Brass Fever, Time Is Running Out (Impulse!, 1976)
- Dee Dee Bridgewater, Dee Dee's Feathers (Okeh, 2015)
- Cachao, Master Sessions Volume I (Epic, 1994)
- Jim Clayton, Songs My Daughter Knows (Clay-Tone, 2013)
- Jon Cleary, Moonburn (Pointblank, 1999)
- Con Funk Shun, Candy (Mercury, 1979)
- Michael Des Barres, Somebody Up There Likes Me (Gold Mountain, 1986)
- Djavan, Bird of Paradise (Columbia, 1988)
- Lamont Dozier, Peddlin' Music On the Side (Warner Bros., 1977)
- Pete Escovedo & Sheila Escovedo, Solo Two (Fantasy, 1977)
- Terry Garthwaite, Terry (Arista Records, 1975)
- Eddy Grant, Love in Exile (ICE, 1980)
- Nigel Hall, Ladies & Gentlemen... Nigel Hall (Round Hill, 2015)
- George Howard, Attitude Adjustment (GRP, 1996)
- Bobbi Humphrey, Tailor Made (Epic, 1977)
- Bobby Hutcherson, Conception: the Gift of Love (Columbia, 1979)
- Phyllis Hyman, Somewhere in My Lifetime (Arista, 1978)
- Ahmad Jamal, One (20th Century Fox, 1978)
- Salif Keita, Amen (Island, 1991)
- Babatunde Lea, March of the Jazz Guerrillas (Ubiquity, 2000)
- Jon Lucien, Listen Love (Mercury, 1991)
- Bobby Lyle, The Journey (Atlantic, 1990)
- Taj Mahal, Like Never Before (Private Music, 1991)
- Wade Marcus, Metamorphosis (ABC Impulse!, 1976)
- Harvey Mason, Chameleon (Concord, 2014)
- Bennie Maupin, The Jewel in the Lotus (ECM, 1974)
- Country Joe McDonald, Goodbye Blues (Fantasy, 1977)
- Idris Muhammad, You Ain't No Friend of Mine! (Fantasy, 1978)
- Maria Muldaur, Fanning the Flames (Telarc, 1996)
- Meshell Ndegeocello, Plantation Lullabies (Sire, 1993)
- Merl Saunders, Fire Up (Fantasy, 1973)
- Seawind, Window of a Child (CTI, 1977)
- Wayne Shorter, Phantom Navigator (Columbia, 1987)
- Nina Simone, A Single Woman (Elektra, 1993)
- Sting, The Soul Cages (A&M, 1990)
- Kevin Toney, Special K (Fantasy, 1982)
- Allen Toussaint, Connected (NYNO, 1996)
- Stanley Turrentine, Everybody Come On Out (Fantasy, 1976)
- McCoy Tyner, Together (Milestone, 1979)
- The Wailing Souls, All Over the World (Columbia, 1992)
- Lenny Williams, Rise Sleeping Beauty (Motown, 1975)
- Bobby Womack, Safety Zone (United Artists, 1975)
- Stevie Wonder, Conversation Peace (Motown, 1995)

=== Singles ===
| Year | Title | Chart Positions | |
| Year | Title | U.S. Black Singles | U.S. Disco Singles |
|---|---|---|---|
| 1977 | "Come into My Life" | No. 84 | - |
| 1979 | "Straight to the Bank" | No. 45 | No. 34 |
| 1981 | "Call It What You Want" | No. 16 | No. 21 |
| 1982 | "At the Concert" | No. 38 | - |
| 1983 | "It's Over" | No. 63 | - |
