= Mahal (Eddie Henderson album) =

Studio album by Eddie Henderson
- Released: 1978
- Recorded: 1978
- Studios: Wally Heider, San Francisco, CA
- Genre: Jazz-funk
- Label: Capitol ST 11846
- Producer: Skip Drinkwater

Eddie Henderson chronology
Comin' Through (1977)	Mahal (1978)	Runnin' to Your Love (1979)

Mahal is an album by American jazz trumpeter Eddie Henderson. It was recorded in 1978, his second album released on the Capitol label.

== Reception ==
Professional ratings
Review scores
Source	Rating
AllMusic	2/5 stars

The Bay State Banner wrote: "Gathering all the old Herbie Hancock Sextet alumni (Maupin, Priester, Hancock) was a good idea but the blend of electronic textures and a disco beat don't work."

The AllMusic review by Richard S. Ginell determined that there are "more disco excursions for Capitol's A&R department and more listless themes for Henderson's horn to purvey, although his solo contributions are somewhat more involving this time."

== Track listing ==
All compositions by Eddie Henderson except as indicated

1. "Butterfly" (Herbie Hancock, Bennie Maupin) - 8:05
2. "Cyclops" (James Mtume) - 5:18
3. "Emotions" - 4:59
4. "Prance On" (Mtume) - 5:16
5. "Amoroso" (Benny Maupin) - 5:38
6. "Mahal" - 4:27
7. "Ecstasy" - 3:25

== Personnel ==
- Eddie Henderson – trumpet, flugelhorn
- Hubert Laws – flute
- Julian Priester – trombone
- Bennie Maupin – tenor saxophone, saxello
- Herbie Hancock – electric piano, clavinet, synthesizer
- Mtume – piano, congas
- John Bowen – synthesizer, programming
- Ray Obiedo – guitars
- Paul Jackson – bass
- Howard King – drums
- Bill Summers – congas, percussion
