= Monster (Herbie Hancock album) =

Studio album by Herbie Hancock
- Released: 1980
- Recorded: 1979–1980
- Studio: The Village Recorder, Los Angeles; United Western Studios, Los Angeles; The Automatt, San Francisco
- Genre: Disco
- Length: 42:07
- Label: Columbia
- Producer: Herbie Hancock, David Rubinson

Herbie Hancock chronology
The Piano (1979)	Monster (1980)	Mr. Hands (1980)

Professional ratings
Review scores
Source	Rating
AllMusic	2/5 stars
The Rolling Stone Jazz Record Guide	1/5 stars

Monster is the twenty-third album by jazz pianist Herbie Hancock. As a follow-up to the album Feets, Don't Fail Me Now (1979), it continued the trend of disco songs. The album features vocals on each track, this time without vocoder processing. The album also includes an appearance by Carlos Santana on the opening track "Saturday Night"; this track was the first of many eventual collaborations with Santana, including the 1980 album The Swing of Delight. The track "Stars In Your Eyes" was issued as an extended 12" single.

== Track listing ==
1. "Saturday Night" (Jeffrey Cohen, Hancock, David Rubinson) - 7:13
2. "Stars in Your Eyes" (Lisa Capuano, Gavin Christopher, Hancock, Ray Parker Jr.) - 7:05
3. "Go for It" (Cohen, Hancock, Alphonse Mouzon, Rubinson) - 7:35
4. "Don't Hold It In" (Cohen, Melvin Ragin) - 8:02
5. "Making Love" (Hancock, Mouzon) - 6:23
6. "It All Comes Around" (Cohen, Ragin, Rubinson) - 5:49

== Personnel ==
- Herbie Hancock - synthesizer, acoustic piano, keyboards, vocals, clavinet, Minimoog, Oberheim Eight Voice, Prophet 5, clavitar
- Carlos Santana (1), Randy Hansen (4, 6), Wah Wah Watson - guitar
- Freddie Washington - bass
- Alphonse Mouzon - drums, synthesizer (3), keyboards
- Sheila Escovedo - percussion
- Gavin Christopher (2, 4), Greg Walker (1, 5), Oren Waters (3) - lead vocals
- Bill Champlin - backing vocals, lead vocals (6)
- Julia Tillman Waters, Luther Waters, Oren Waters, Maxine Willard Waters - backing vocals

Technical

- David Rubinson, Fred Catero - engineer
- Jeffrey Cohen - associate producer
- Gahan Wilson - cover artwork
