= Feets, Don't Fail Me Now =

Studio album by Herbie Hancock
- Released: February 18, 1979
- Recorded: 1978; The Automatt, San Francisco
- Genre: Electronic, funk, jazz, disco
- Length: 40:38
- Label: Columbia
- Producer: David Rubinson, Herbie Hancock

Herbie Hancock chronology
Directstep (1979)	Feets, Don't Fail Me Now (1979)	The Piano (1979)

Professional ratings
Review scores
Source	Rating
AllMusic	2/5 stars
The Rolling Stone Jazz Record Guide	1/5 stars
Smash Hits	5/10

Feets, Don't Fail Me Now is the twenty-second album by jazz pianist Herbie Hancock. The record was released in February 1979 by Columbia Records.

== Overview ==
This was the first of Hancock's albums to discard jazz completely in favor of a more commercial disco sound, with vocoder effects and repeating lyrics. Background vocals were provided by The Waters, a family vocal group from Los Angeles. All LP and CD editions after the first pressing use an alternate "Disco Mix" version of "Tell Everybody". The original version was included as a bonus track on the disc in the Complete Columbia Albums Collection box set.

== Track listing ==
1. "You Bet Your Love" (Herbie Hancock, David Rubinson, Allee Willis, Jeffrey Cohen) – 7:41
2. "Trust Me" (Hancock, Rubinson, Allee Willis) – 5:44
3. "Ready or Not" (Ray Parker Jr., Cohen) – 6:48
4. "Tell Everybody" (Hancock, Rubinson, Bruce Good, Cohen) – 7:49
5. "Honey From the Jar" (Hancock, Cohen) – 6:53
6. "Knee Deep" (Hancock, Melvin Ragin) – 5:43

== Personnel ==
- Herbie Hancock – lead and backing vocals, all keyboards
- James Gadson – drums
- Eddie Watkins – bass
- Ray Obiedo – guitar
- Bill Summers – percussion
- Julia Tillman Waters, Maxine Willard Waters, Oren Waters and Luther Waters – backing vocals
- Ray Parker Jr. – guitar and drums on "Ready or Not"
- Coke Escovedo – timbales on "Ready or Not"
- Sheila Escovedo – congas on "Ready or Not"
- James Levi – drums on "Knee Deep" and "Trust Me"
- Freddie Washington – bass on "Knee Deep"
- Wah Wah Watson – guitar on "Knee Deep"
- Bennie Maupin – soprano saxophone on "Knee Deep"
- Brian L Davis – additional percussion

=== Additional personnel ===
- Produced by – David Rubinson & Friends Inc. and Herbie Hancock
- Associate producer – Jeffrey Cohen
- Engineers – Fred Catero and David Rubinson
- Assistant engineers – Chris Minto, Leslie Ann Jones, Ken Kassie and Cheryl Ward
- Mastering engineer – Phil Brown
- Keyboard and Vocoder engineer – Bryan Bell
- Synthesizer Programming – Gordon Bahary
