= Randy Hansen =

American guitarist (born 1954)

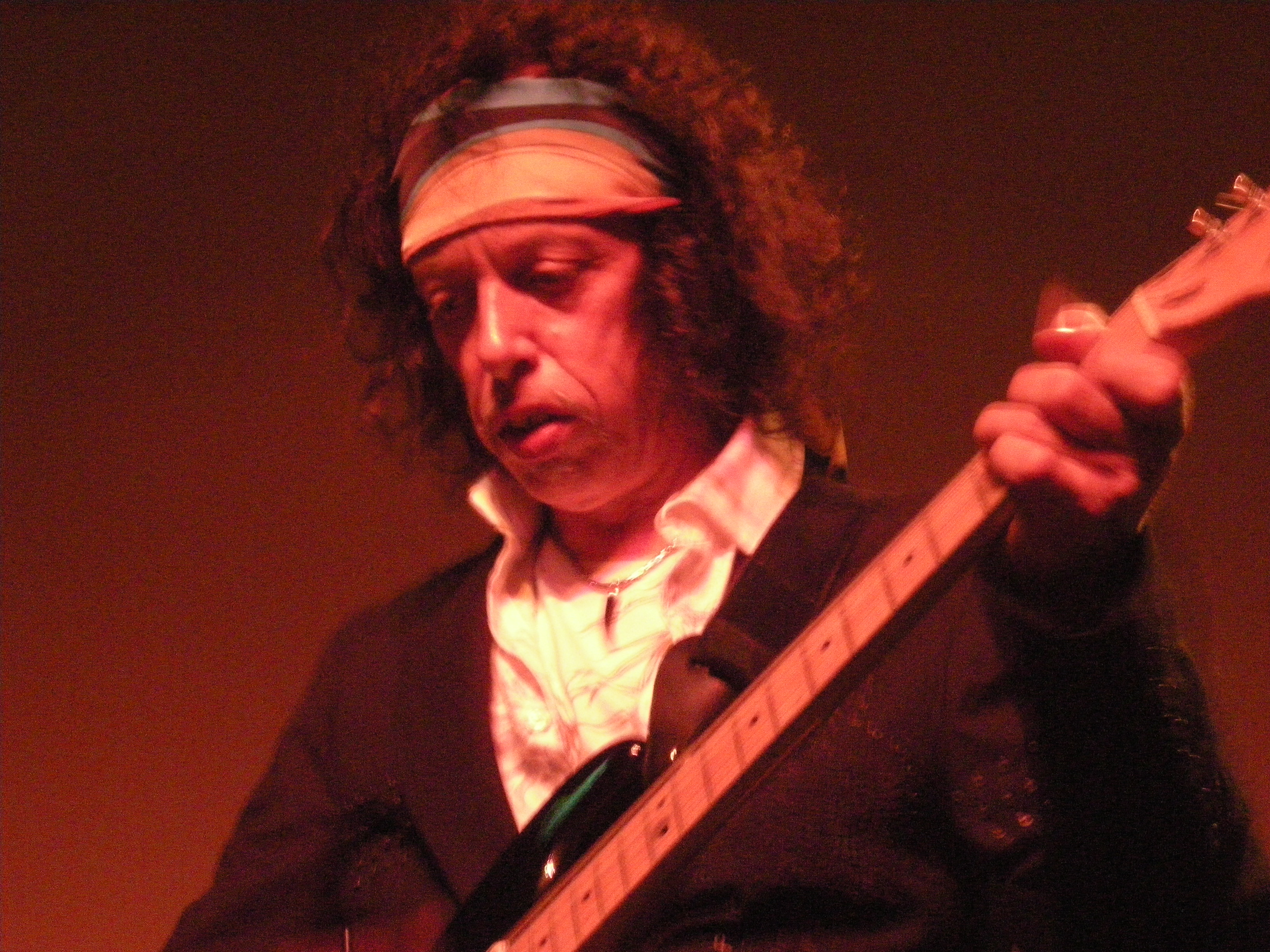
- Hansen performing with Café Authors in 2008

Background information
- Born: December 8, 1954 (age 71); Seattle, Washington, U.S.
- Genres: Psychedelic rock; blues; R&B
- Instrument: Guitar
- Years active: 1972–present
- Labels: Grooveyard; Capitol
- Website: randyhansen.com

Randy Hansen (born December 8, 1954) is an American guitarist best known for his "Rock Tribute Act" honoring Jimi Hendrix.

== Background ==
Randy Hansen, born in Seattle, Washington on 8 December, 1954.

He continues to perform as a solo artist in the Pacific Northwest and elsewhere in the United States.

Hansen has four self-released CDs of original music in print, all available online - Old Dogs New Tricks, Good Intentions, Tower of Love and Funtown which was released on the German Jazzhaus records label. He continues to live in Seattle. As of 2008, Hansen is on the roster of Gen-X Entertainment Intl. Inc., who also represent bands ranging from the Amazing Rhythm Aces to the current incarnation of Jefferson Starship.

== Career ==
He composed 17 minutes of the soundtrack for the 1979 movie Apocalypse Now, (1980 Academy Award Winner for Best Sound). His debut album was released in 1980 on Capitol Records and was recorded at the Automatt Studios in San Francisco with Scott Rosburg on bass and vocals and Charles Tapp on drums and vocals. That group played two North American tours which included several coliseum shows with Bob Seger, Sammy Hagar, REO Speedwagon, Head East, Triumph, Poco and Blue Öyster Cult.

In 1984, Hansen impersonated Jimi Hendrix in the music video for Devo's cover of "Are You Experienced?". He played with comedian Sam Kinison in 1991.

Hansen's Hendrix act first came to prominence with Randy Hansen's Machine Gun (1977–80), with Larry Epperly on bass guitar and Tim Kelliher on drums. All three had previously been in a band called Kid Chrysler and the Cruisers. Hansen's Machine Gun performed on bills with Heart, The Kinks, Stevie Ray Vaughan, and others, and were written up by Rolling Stone and Guitar Player.

After his debut album, Hansen's emphasis continued to be on original releases in the Jimi Hendrix style of composition, in addition to including large numbers of Hendrix compositions in his live shows. One of the high points of Hansen's career was when he played concerts with a band that included the original Jimi Hendrix drummer Mitch Mitchell from The Jimi Hendrix Experience band or Buddy Miles from Jimi Hendrix and the Band of Gypsys. Since 1991, Hansen has toured Europe almost every year with Manni von Bohr on drums and Ufo Walter on bass, in addition to performing at outdoor music festivals.

Hansen co-wrote the song, "The Change" with Buddy Miles. It was included on Buddy Miles Miles Away from Home album that was released in 1997.

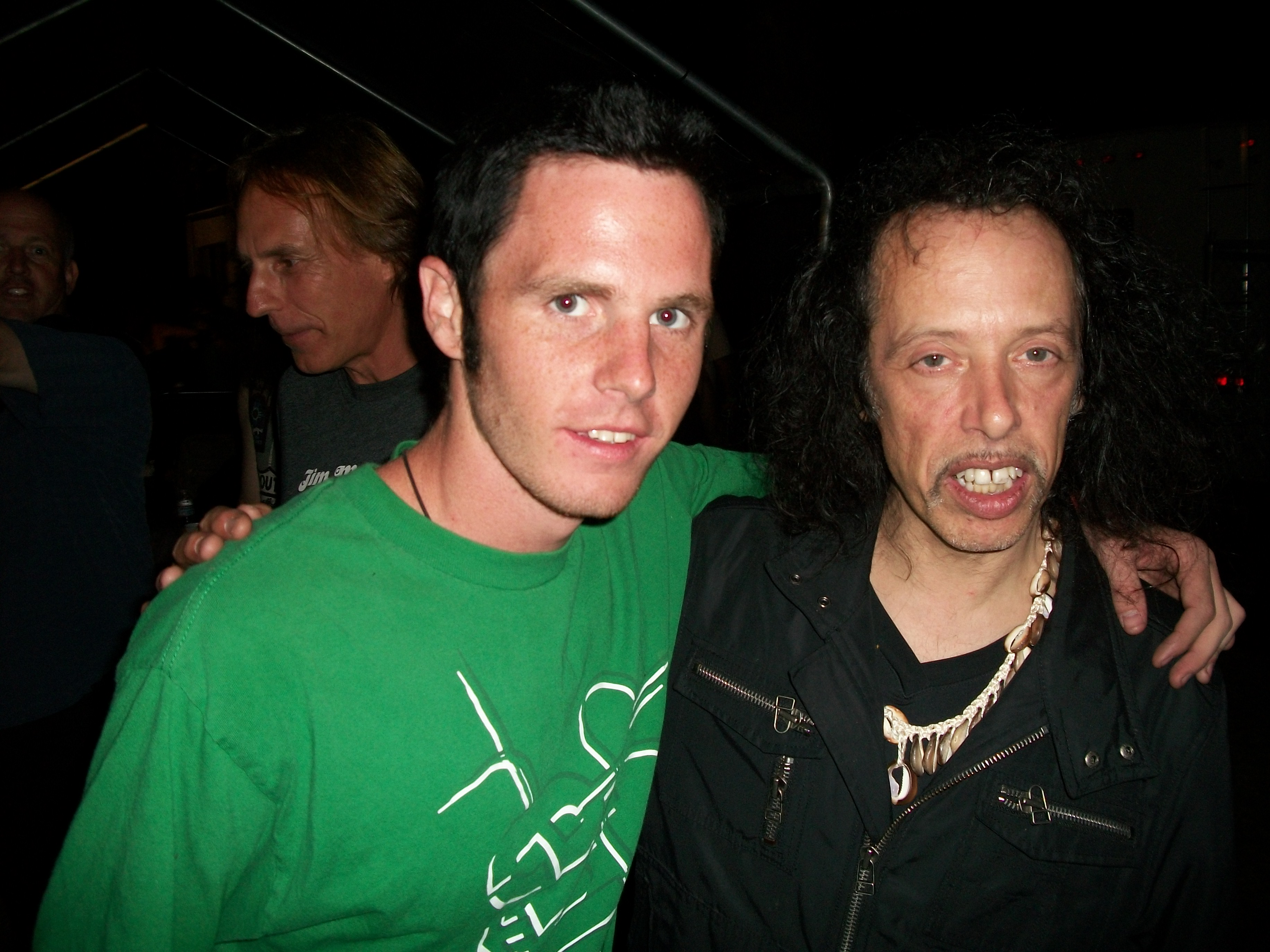
Randy Hansen (right) with Steven Dubois at Irvine Lake's Legends of Rock concert in September 2009

== Discography ==
- Randy Hansen, (Now Hear This, 1971)
- Randy Hansen (Capitol Records, 1980)
- Monster (Herbie Hancock album) (Columbia Records, 1980)
- Astral Projektion (Shrapnel Records, 1983)
- Classics Live - "A tribute to Jimi Hendrix" (Ananaz Records, 1992)
- Hendrix by Hansen (Grooveyard / Affengeil Records, 1993)
- Old Dogs New Tricks (Grooveyard / Green Tree Records, 1997)
- Thinking Of You (Rudolf Music 2000)
- Tower Of Love (Grooveyard / Manni v. Bohr, 2000)
- Good Intentions (Grooveyard / Manni v. Bohr, 2003)
- Alter Ego (Randy Hansen, 2004)
- Live in Berlin DVD (Grooveyard, 2005)
- European Tour 2008 - Hendrix Live
- Live In Boston - December 1980 (Rudolf Music, 2008)
