= Dedication (Herbie Hancock album) =

Live album by Herbie Hancock
- Released: September 21, 1974
- Recorded: July 29, 1974
- Venue: Tokyo Kōsei Nenkin Kaikan concert hall, Shinjuku, Tokyo
- Genre: Jazz; jazz fusion
- Length: 40:38
- Label: CBS/Sony
- Producer: David Rubinson

Herbie Hancock chronology
Head Hunters (1973)	Dedication (1974)	Thrust (1974)

Professional ratings
Review scores
Source	Rating
Allmusic	3/5 stars

Dedication is the thirteenth album by American jazz pianist Herbie Hancock. It was recorded in Japan by Hancock alone in 1974 during a Japanese tour.

== Background ==
Hancock performs "Maiden Voyage" and "Dolphin Dance" on piano, while "Nobu" and "Cantaloupe Island" were performed on electric keyboards and synthesizers.

First released on LP by the Japanese CBS/Sony on September 21, 1974, it was not released on CD outside Japan until 2013, first as part of the 34 disc box set The Complete Columbia Album Collection 1972–1988. It was given an individual reissue in 2014 by Wounded Bird Records.

== Track listing ==
All compositions by Herbie Hancock.

No.	Title	Length
1.	"Maiden Voyage"	7:44
2.	"Dolphin Dance"	11:18
3.	"Nobu"	7:39
4.	"Cantaloupe Island"	13:57

== Personnel ==
- Herbie Hancock - acoustic piano (#1–2), Fender Rhodes, ARP Pro Soloist, ARP Odyssey, ARP 2600, ARP String Ensemble (#3–4)
