= Ray Obiedo =

American jazz guitarist

Ray Obiedo (born January 27, 1952, in Richmond, California) is an American contemporary jazz guitarist.

== Biography ==
Obiedo grew up in Richmond, California, and began playing guitar at age 16. Initially he played both jazz and R&B. He has appeared on records by Herbie Hancock, George Duke, Bob Mintzer, Grover Washington Jr, Lou Rawls, The Whispers, Johnny "Hammond" Smith, Pete Escovedo, Sheila E. and Julian Priester. He was the leader of the jazz fusion group Kick and the rock band Rhythmus 21.

In 1989 he signed with Windham Hill Jazz Records, with whom he released five albums in eight years. Obiedo made his solo debut with 1989's Perfect Crime, followed two years later by Iguana; with 1993's Sticks and Stones, he reached the Top Ten on Billboard's Contemporary Jazz charts. After 1995's African-influenced Zulaya, he resurfaced two years later with Sweet Summer Days featuring vocalist Peabo Bryson. Ray's most recent releases are under his own Rhythmus Records label, 2015's There Goes That, The Latin Jazz Project Vol 1 in 2017, Carousel (2020), The Latin Jazz Project Vol 2 in 2022, Twist released in 2024 and Slight Accent released in 2026.

== Discography ==
=== As leader ===
- Perfect Crime (Windham Hill, 1989)
- Iguana (Windham Hill, 1991) U.S. Top Contemporary Jazz Albums No. 10
- Sticks & Stones (Windham Hill, 1993) U.S. Contemporary Jazz No. 7
- Zulaya (Windham Hill, 1995) U.S. Contemporary Jazz No. 22
- Sweet Summer Days (Windham Hill, 1997)
- Modern World (Domo, 1999)
- There Goes That (Rhythmus, 2014)
- Latin Jazz Project, Vol. 1 (Rhythmus, 2016)
- Carousel (Rhythmus, 2019)
- Latin Jazz Project, Vol. 2 (Rhythmus, 2021)
- Twist (Rhythmus, 2024)
- Slight Accent (Rhythmus, 2026)

With Bill Summers & Summers Heat

- Cayenne (Prestige, 1977)
- Feel the Heat (Prestige, 1977)
- On Sunshine (Prestige, 1978)
- Straight to the Bank (Prestige, 1978)
- Call It What You Want (MCA, 1981)
- Jam the Box (MCA, 1981)
- Seventeen (MCA, 1982)

With Pete Escovedo

- Solo Two (Fantasy, 1977)
- Happy Together (Fantasy, 1978)
- The Island (Esgo, 1982)
- Yesterday's Dreams, Tomorrow's Memories (Esgo, 1985)
- Flying South (Concord, 1995)
- E Street (Concord, 1997)
- E Music (Concord Picante, 2000)
- Live at Stern Grove (Concord, 2012)
- Back to the Bay (Esco 2018)
- Anthology (Esco 2023)

With Herbie Hancock

- Feets, Don't Fail Me Now (CBS, 1979)
- Directstep (CBS Sony, 1979)
- Butterfly with Kimiko Kasai & Herbie Hancock (CBS Sony, 1979)
- Tokyo Sunlight (Megadisc, 2002)

With Sheila E.

- Sex Cymbal (Warner Bros., 1991)
- Writes of Passage (Concord, 2000)
- Heaven (Concord, 2001)

=== As sideman, producer ===
- Johnny "Hammond" Smith Forever Taurus (Milestone) 1976
- Bobbi Humphrey Tailor Made (Epic) 1977
- Julian Priester Polarization (ECM) 1977 (as composer/sideman)
- Eddie Henderson Mahal (Capitol) 1978
- Paul Jackson Black Octopus (Toshiba-EMI) 1978
- George Duke Master of the Game (Epic) 1979
- Michael Paulo Tats in the Rainbow (Trio-Kenwood) 1979
- Mark Soskin Rhythm Vision (Prestige) 1980
- The Waters Watercolors (Arista) 1980
- Rodney Franklin Endless Flight (CBS) 1981
- The Whispers Love Is Where You Find It (Solar) 1981
- Carrie Lucas Still in Love (Solar) 1982 (as co-producer/composer/sideman)
- Holly Near Speed of Light (Redwood) 1982
- Cornelius Bumpus Beacon (Broadbeach) 1983
- The Whispers Love for Love (Solar) 1983 (as co-producer/composer/sideman)
- Linda Tillery Secrets (Redwood) 1985 (as producer/composer/sideman)
- R.O.A.R. R.O.A.R. (CBS) 1985
- L.J. Reynolds Tell Me You Will (Fantasy) 1987
- Brenda Russell Kiss Me With the Wind (A&M) 1990
- Lou Rawls It's Supposed to Be Fun (Blue Note) 1990
- Rad Venus Drops (Soulciety) 1993
- Claudia Villela Asa Verde (Taina) 1994
- Marc Russo The Window (JVC) 1994
- Rad Gotta Be (Soulciety) 1994
- David Garibaldi The Funky Beat (1 & 2) (Manhattan) 1996 (as composer & sideman)
- Grover Washington, Jr. Soulful Strut (Columbia) 1996
- David K Mathews Down With It 1998 (as producer/engineer/sideman)
- The Whispers Love for Love (Solar) 1998 (as co-producer/composer/sideman)
- Braxton Brothers Now & Forever (Windham Hill) 1999
- Delfonics Forever New (Volt) 1999
- Marion Meadows Next to You (Heads Up) 2000 (as co-producer/composer/sideman)
- Tom Grant Tune It In (Windham Hill) 2000 (as producer/engineer/sideman)
- Zigaboo Modeliste Zigaboo (JZM) 2000
- Freda Payne Come See About Me (Volt) 2001
- Marion Meadows In Deep (Heads Up) 2002
- Rad Live Live in Paris (7 Bridges) 2003
- Intuit Intuit (Compost) 2004 (as co-producer/engineer/sideman)
- Intuit Planet Birth (Compost) 2004 (as co-producer/engineer/sideman)
- Joyce Cooling This Girl's Got to Play (Narada) 2004 (as engineer/sideman)
- Joyce Cooling Revolving Door (Narada) 2006 (as engineer/sideman)
- Doc Kupka Doc Goes Hollywood (Strokeland) 2008
- Rad Live in Japan (7 Bridges) 2008
- Intuit Voyage No. 2 (In + Out) 2011
- Amikaeyla Being in Love (Rootsjazz) 2012 (as co-producer /engineer/sideman)
- George Duke Complete 1970's Epic Albums (Epic) 2012
- Pacific Mambo Orchestra Pacific Mambo Orchestra (PMO) 2012
- Chloé Jean Fairy Tale Fail (Rhythmus Records 2023)
- Chloé Jean Priority (Rhythmus Records 2026)
- Johnny Valdes "Standards & Consersation" (Rhythmus Records 2026)
