= Thrust (album) =

Studio album by Herbie Hancock
- Released: September 6, 1974
- Recorded: August 1974
- Studios: Wally Heider Studios, San Francisco; Different Fur Music, San Francisco
- Genre: Jazz-funk
- Length: 38:49
- Label: Columbia
- Producers: David Rubinson, Herbie Hancock

Herbie Hancock chronology
| Dedication (1974) | Thrust (1974) | Death Wish (1974) |

Professional ratings
Review scores
| Source | Rating |
|---|---|
| All About Jazz | 4.5/5 stars |
| AllMusic | 4/5 stars |
| Christgau's Record Guide | C+ |
| The Penguin Guide to Jazz Recordings | 3.5/4 stars |
| The Rolling Stone Jazz Record Guide | 3/5 stars |

Thrust is the fourteenth studio album by American jazz-funk musician Herbie Hancock, released in September 1974 on Columbia Records. The album reached No. 2 on the Billboard Top Soul Albums chart and No. 13 on the Billboard 200 chart. It is the second album featuring the Headhunters: saxophonist Bennie Maupin, bass guitarist Paul Jackson, drummer Mike Clark (replacing Harvey Mason in this role), and percussionist Bill Summers.

== Background ==
Thrust was produced by David Rubinson and Hancock.

== Covers ==
"Actual Proof" was covered by the Peter Zak Trio (2006) and Roberta Piket (2015).

The composition "Butterfly" was subsequently performed by Hancock himself on his live album Flood (1975), on his studio albums Direct Step (1979) and Dis Is da Drum (1994), and on Kimiko Kasai's album Butterfly (1979). "Butterfly" was also covered by Norman Connors (1978), Eddie Henderson (1978), Toto (2002), Austin Peralta (2006), Azymuth (2008), Robert Glasper Experiment, and Gretchen Parlato (2009).

"Spank-a-Lee" was covered by Mitchel Forman (2001).

== In popular culture ==
A variation of the composition "Palm Grease" was used in the 1974 vigilante film Death Wish, starring Charles Bronson.

The composition "Actual Proof" was originally written for the 1973 film The Spook Who Sat by the Door, and Hancock has used it as a demonstration of his style of playing the Fender Rhodes piano.

== Track listing ==
Side A
| No. | Title | Writer(s) | Length |
|---|---|---|---|
| 1. | "Palm Grease" | Herbie Hancock | 10:38 |
| 2. | "Actual Proof" | Hancock | 9:42 |
| Total length: | | | 19:57 |

Side B
| No. | Title | Writer(s) | Length |
|---|---|---|---|
| 3. | "Butterfly" | Hancock, Bennie Maupin | 11:17 |
| 4. | "Spank-a-Lee" | Hancock, Mike Clark, Paul Jackson | 7:12 |
| Total length: | | | 18:14 |

== Personnel ==
- Herbie Hancock – Fender Rhodes electric piano, Hohner D6 clavinet, ARP Odyssey, ARP Soloist, ARP 2600, ARP String Ensemble
- Bennie Maupin – tenor saxophone, soprano saxophone, saxello, bass clarinet, alto flute
- Paul Jackson – electric bass
- Mike Clark – drums
- Bill Summers – percussion
