= The New Standard (Herbie Hancock album) =

Studio album by Herbie Hancock
- Released: February 19, 1996
- Recorded: June 14–16, 1995
- Studios: Manhattan Center Studios, New York
- Genre: Jazz
- Length: 77:15
- Label: Verve
- Producers: Guy Eckstine, Herbie Hancock

Herbie Hancock chronology
Dis Is da Drum (1994)	The New Standard (1996)	1+1 (1997)

Professional ratings
Review scores
Source	Rating
AllMusic	4/5 stars
Tom Hull	B
The Penguin Guide to Jazz Recordings	3.5/4 stars

The New Standard is the thirty-fifth album by jazz pianist Herbie Hancock, released in 1996 on Verve. It consists of jazz renditions of classic and contemporaneous rock and R&B songs. It features an all-star sextet with saxophonist Michael Brecker, guitarist John Scofield, bassist Dave Holland, percussionist Don Alias and drummer Jack DeJohnette.

== Track listing ==
1. "New York Minute" (Don Henley, Danny Kortchmar, Jai Winding) - 8:35
2. "Mercy Street" (Peter Gabriel) - 8:36
3. "Norwegian Wood (This Bird Has Flown)" (John Lennon, Paul McCartney) - 8:07
4. "When Can I See You" (Kenny "Babyface" Edmonds) - 6:17
5. "You've Got It Bad Girl" (Stevie Wonder, Yvonne Wright) - 7:15
6. "Love Is Stronger Than Pride" (Sade Adu, Andrew Hale, Stuart Matthewman) - 8:00
7. "Scarborough Fair" (Traditional) - 8:24
8. "Thieves in the Temple" (Prince) - 7:33
9. "All Apologies" (Kurt Cobain) - 5:08
10. "Manhattan (Island of Lights and Love)" (Herbie Hancock, Jean Hancock) - 4:06
11. "Your Gold Teeth II" (Donald Fagen, Walter Becker) - 5:14

=== Japan version disk two ===
1. "You've Got It Bad Girl" - 21:03
2. "Thieves in the Temple" - 17:42
3. "Dolphin Dance" - 12:09

== Personnel ==
- Herbie Hancock - piano
- Michael Brecker - tenor and soprano saxophone
- John Scofield - acoustic and electric guitar, electric sitar
- Dave Holland - acoustic bass
- Jack DeJohnette - drums, electric percussion
- Don Alias - percussion
