= Sunlight (Herbie Hancock album) =

Studio album by Herbie Hancock
- Released: 1978
- Genres: Jazz, funk
- Length: 39:26
- Label: Columbia
- Producers: Herbie Hancock, David Rubinson

Herbie Hancock chronology
VSOP: Tempest in the Colosseum (1977)	Sunlight (1978)	An Evening with Herbie Hancock & Chick Corea: In Concert (1978)

Sunlight is an album by keyboardist Herbie Hancock. It features Hancock's vocals through a Sennheiser VSM-201 vocoder, as well as performances by drummer Tony Williams and bassist Jaco Pastorius on “Good Question”.

== Critical reception ==
Professional ratings
Review scores
Source	Rating
AllMusic	3/5 stars

The Globe and Mail wrote that Hancock "has returned to directionless electronic funk, saved only by a medium-tempo jazz number, 'Come Running to Me'."

== Track listing ==
All tracks composed by Herbie Hancock, except where indicated.

Side one

1. "I Thought It Was You" (Hancock, Melvin Ragin, Jeffrey Cohen) – 8:56
2. "Come Running to Me" (lyrics: Allee Willis) – 8:25

Side two

1. "Sunlight" – 7:12
2. "No Means Yes" – 6:21
3. "Good Question" – 8:32

== Personnel ==
Musicians

- Herbie Hancock – keyboards, synthesizers, lead and background vocals (through vocoder) (1–3), string, brass and woodwind arrangements
- Patrick Gleeson – additional synthesizers (5)
- Bennie Maupin – soprano saxophone solo (3)
- Wah Wah Watson, Ray Parker Jr. – guitar (1,3)
- Byron Miller (1), Paul Jackson (2–4), Jaco Pastorius (5) – electric bass
- Leon "Ndugu" Chancler (1), James Levi (2, 3), Harvey Mason, Sr. (4), Tony Williams (5) – drums
- Raul Rekow (exc. 3), Bill Summers (exc. 1) – percussion
- Baba Duru – tabla (2)
- Bobby Shew, Maurice Spears, Robert O'Bryant, Garnett Brown – brass (exc. 4)
- Ernest J. Watts, Fred Jackson, Jr., Jack Nimitz, David Willard Riddles – woodwind (2, 5)
- Terry Adams, Roy Malan, Nathan Rubin, Linda Wood, Emily VanValkenburgh – strings (2)

Production

- Herbie Hancock and David Rubinson – producers
- David Rubinson, Fred Catero (with Chris Minto and Cheryl Ward) – engineers at The Automatt
- Steve Mantoani – engineer at Different Fur Trading Co.
- Terry Becker – assistant engineer (brass)
- Phill Brown – mastering
