= Mr. Hands (album) =

Studio album by Herbie Hancock
- Released: October 1, 1980
- Recorded: 1980
- Studios: The Automatt, Filmways/Heider, The Village Recorder
- Genre: Jazz fusion
- Length: 39:55
- Label: Columbia
- Producers: Herbie Hancock, David Rubinson

Herbie Hancock chronology
Monster (1980)	Mr. Hands (1980)	Magic Windows (1981)

Professional ratings
Review scores
Source	Rating
AllMusic	4/5 stars
The Penguin Guide to Jazz Recordings	3.5/4 stars
The Rolling Stone Jazz Record Guide	4/5 stars

Mr. Hands is the twenty-fourth album by Herbie Hancock. Unlike the preceding album, Monster, which was conceptualized as a dance album, Mr. Hands is a collection of different musical styles with distinct groups. It features bass guitarist Jaco Pastorius on the track "4 A.M.," plus multiple guests including Bennie Maupin, Sheila E. and Ron Carter, plus an all-synthesizer track ("Textures") performed entirely by Hancock. "Shiftless Shuffle" (originally released on the 1979 Japan-only album Directstep) was recorded by the members of the Headhunters quintet in 1973 during the sessions for the album Head Hunters. This album was the first on which Hancock used a computer, an Apple II. He continued his relationship with Apple Computer for many years.

Overlooked when it was originally released, this was Hancock's last outing of "straight" electric jazz for some time, as he began to focus more on his R&B influences.

== Track listing ==
All songs composed by Herbie Hancock, except 3 by F.Washington, H.Hancock, M.Ragin; 5 by B.Maupin, B.Summers, H.Mason, H.Hancock, P.Jackson.

No.	Title	Length
1.	"Spiraling Prism"	6:25
2.	"Calypso"	6:44
3.	"Just Around the Corner"	7:36
4.	"4 A.M."	5:23
5.	"Shiftless Shuffle"	7:10
6.	"Textures"	6:37
Total length:		39:55

== Personnel ==
- Herbie Hancock - synthesizer, acoustic piano, electric piano, keyboards, vocals (through vocoder), clavinet, Minimoog, ARP 2600, Apple II, Linn LM-1 drum computer
- Bennie Maupin - tenor saxophone (5)
- Wah Wah Watson - guitar (3)
- Byron Miller (1), Ron Carter (2), Freddie Washington (3), Jaco Pastorius (4), Paul Jackson (5) - bass
- Leon Chancler (1), Tony Williams (2), Alphonse Mouzon (3), Harvey Mason (4,5) - drums
- Bill Summers (1, 4–5), Sheila Escovedo (2–3) - percussion
