= Kimiko Kasai =

Japanese retired jazz singer (born 1945)

- Born: December 15, 1945 (age 80); Kyoto, Japan
- Genres: Jazz
- Occupation: Vocalist
- Years active: mid 1960s–1998
- Labels: Victor; CBS/Sony
- Spouse: Richard Rudolph (m. 1990)
- Relatives: Maya Rudolph (stepdaughter)

Kimiko Kasai (笠井 紀美子, Kasai Kimiko) (born December 15, 1945) is a Japanese retired jazz singer.

== Biography ==
Kasai was born in Kyoto, Japan in 1945. She first became interested in jazz at the age of 13 after hearing Chris Connor's song "All About Ronnie" on the radio. At age 16 she moved to Tokyo and started performing in jazz clubs. Her first recording was with Japanese pianist Yuzuru Sera in 1968

Kasai's debut album as a solo artist was entitled Just Friends in 1970. In the following year, Kasai sang the advertising jingle of "Cup Noodles," a brand of the world's first instant cup noodle ramen. In June 1972, she signed on an exclusive contract with CBS/Sony, and recorded Satin Doll with support of Gil Evans during Evans' first visitation to Japan.

Later she recorded many albums in collaboration with musicians in the jazz field, such as Teo Macero, Lee Konitz, Stan Getz, Paulinho Da Costa, Billy Higgins, Cedar Walton and Herbie Hancock.

In the 1980s, Kimiko stopped performing and later moved into the jewelry design business.

Kasai married American musician Richard Rudolph in 1990 and through her marriage is the stepmother of actress and comedian Maya Rudolph.

== Discography ==
- 1968: The Modern Playing Mate (Union) – Yuzuru Sera Trio introducing Kimiko Kasai
- 1970: Just Friends (London) – Live
- 1971: Yellow Carcass in the Blue (TBM) – with Kosuke Mine Quartet
- 1971: One for Lady (Victor) – with Mal Waldron
- 1972: Umbrella (CBS/Sony) – works of Hiroshi Kamayatsu
- 1972: Satin Doll (CBS/Sony) – with Gil Evans Orchestra
- 1973: What’s New (CBS/Sony)
- 1974: In Person (CBS/Sony) – Featuring Oliver Nelson
- 1974: Thanks Dear (CBS/Sony)
- 1974: Kimiko Is Here (CBS/Sony) – with Cedar Walton Trio
- 1975: This Is My Love (CBS/Sony) – produced by Teo Macero, with Lee Konitz and Stan Getz
- 1976: We Can Fall in Love (CBS/Sony) – produced by Teo Macero
- 1977: Tokyo Special (CBS/Sony)
- 1978: Round and Round (CBS/Sony)
- 1979: Butterfly (CBS/Sony) – with Herbie Hancock. Reissued (Be With Records, 2018).
- 1982: Kimiko (CBS/Sony)
- 1982: Love Connection (CBS/Sony)
- 1984: Love Talk (CBS/Sony)
- 1984: New Pastel (CBS/Sony)
- 1985: Watching You (CBS/Sony)
- 1986: My One and Only Love (CBS/Sony)
- 1987: Perigo a Noite (Eastworld)
- 1990: Kimiko Kasai (Kitty) – with Cedar Walton Trio

== Filmography ==
- Hairpin Circus (1972) as Rie Mizukami
