= Jeffrey E. Cohen =

American songwriter

Jeffrey E. Cohen is an American R&B, soul and funk songwriter and record producer who is best known for the collaboration with prolific singer-songwriter, record producer and drummer Narada Michael Walden. Together, they wrote for numerous artists like Jermaine Stewart, Patti Austin, Aretha Franklin, Shanice, Stacy Lattisaw, George Benson, Gladys Knight, Angela Bofill, Regina Belle, actor-singer Eddie Murphy and Clarence Clemons. As a solo songwriter, he wrote songs for Ryuichi Sakamoto, Herbie Hancock, Rick Astley and Santana. He's won a Grammy Award for Best R&B Song along with Narada Michael Walden, for their work "Freeway of Love" by Aretha Franklin. Their songs have been sampled by some hip hop/R&B artists, such as Kris Kross ("Live and Die for Hip Hop", which is sampled no. 1 R&B hit "Baby Come to Me" by Regina Belle), Faith Evans ("Live Will Pass You By", which is sampled "Gotta Make It Up to You" by Angela Bofill), Mariah Carey ("Heartbreaker", which prominently sampled "Attack of the Name Game" by Stacy Lattisaw).
