= Herbie Hancock =

American jazz pianist and composer (born 1940)

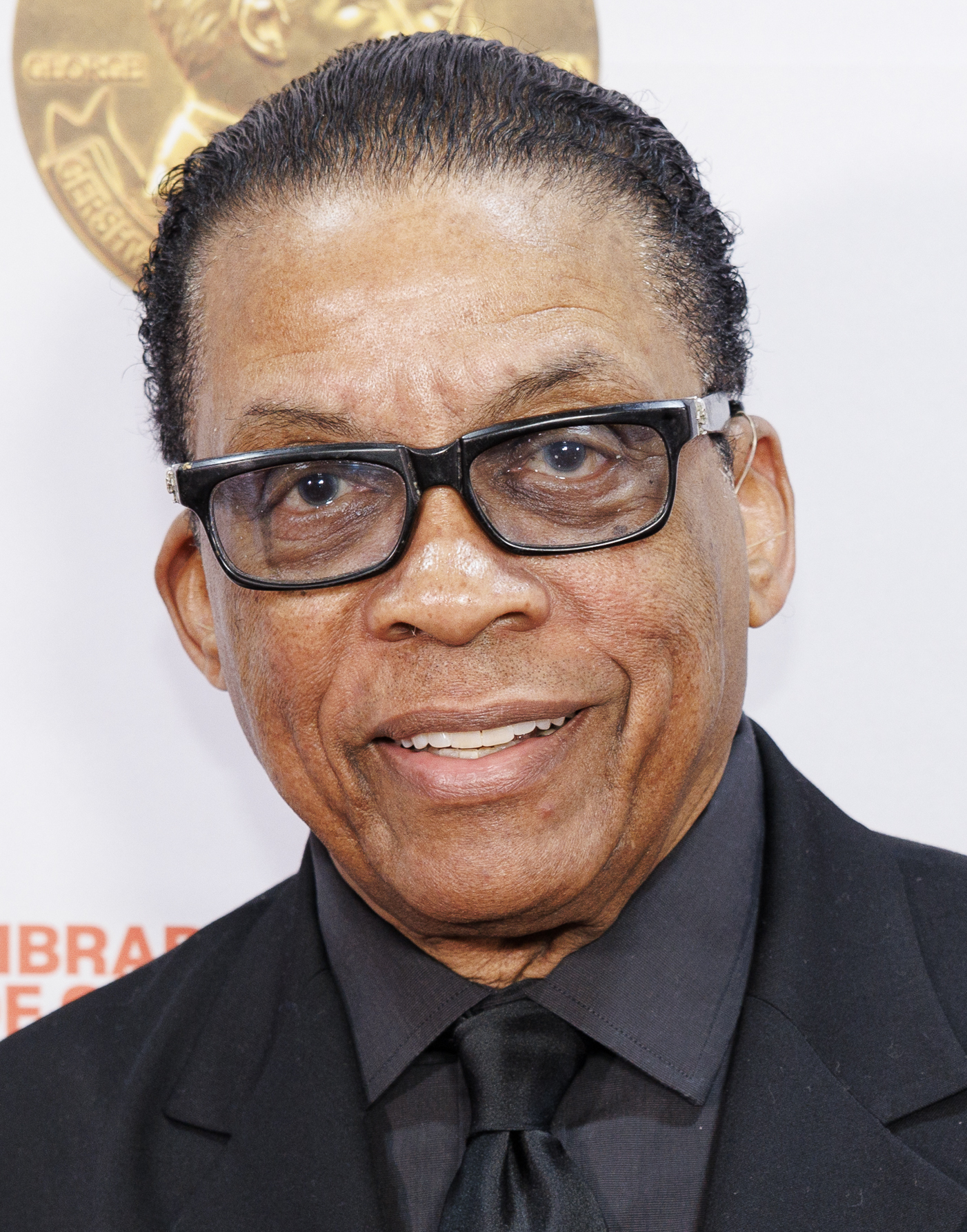
- Hancock in 2023

Background information
- Born: Herbert Jeffrey Hancock; April 12, 1940 (age 86); Chicago, Illinois, U.S.
- Education: Grinnell College; Roosevelt University; Manhattan School of Music
- Genres: Jazz; post-bop; modal jazz; fusion; jazz-funk; avant-garde jazz; electro
- Occupations: Musician; composer; bandleader; record producer; actor
- Instruments: Keyboards; keytar; vocoder; synthesizer
- Works: Herbie Hancock discography
- Years active: 1961–present
- Labels: Columbia; Blue Note; Warner Bros.; Mercury; Verve
- Spouse: Gigi Meixner (m. 1968)
- Children: 1
- Website: herbiehancock.com

Herbert Jeffrey Hancock (born April 12, 1940) is an American jazz musician, bandleader, and composer. He started his career with trumpeter Donald Byrd's group. Hancock soon joined the Miles Davis Quintet, where he helped to redefine the role of a jazz rhythm section and was one of the primary architects of the post-bop sound. In the 1970s, he experimented with jazz fusion, funk, and electro styles using a wide array of synthesizers and electronics. It was during this time that he released one of his best-known and most influential albums, Head Hunters.

Hancock's best-known compositions include "Cantaloupe Island", "Watermelon Man", "Maiden Voyage", and "Chameleon", all of which are jazz standards. During the 1980s, he had a hit single with the electronic instrumental "Rockit", a collaboration with bassist/producer Bill Laswell. Hancock has won an Academy Award and 14 Grammy Awards, including Album of the Year for his 2007 album River: The Joni Letters, a tribute to his friend Joni Mitchell. In 2024, Neil McCormick of The Daily Telegraph ranked Hancock as the greatest keyboard player of all time. In 2025, he received the Polar Music Prize.

Since 2012, Hancock has served as a professor at the University of California, Los Angeles, where he teaches at the UCLA Herb Alpert School of Music. He is also the chairman of the Herbie Hancock Institute of Jazz (known as the Thelonious Monk Institute of Jazz until 2019).

== Early life ==
Hancock was born in Chicago, Illinois, the son of Winnie Belle (née Griffin), a secretary, and Wayman Edward Hancock, a meat inspector for the government. His parents named him after the singer and actor Herb Jeffries. Hancock attended Hyde Park High School in Chicago. He began playing the piano at the age of seven, and his talent was recognized early on. Like many jazz pianists, Herbie took classical piano lessons. Considered to be a child prodigy, he played the first movement of Mozart's Piano Concerto No. 26 in D Major, K. 537 (Coronation) at a young people's concert on February 5, 1952, with the Chicago Symphony Orchestra (led by CSO assistant conductor George Schick) at the age of 11.

During his teenage years, Herbie Hancock did not have a jazz teacher. He developed his ear and sense of harmony by listening to Hard Bop by Art Blakey's the Jazz Messengers, Birth of the Cool by Miles Davis, and the recordings of jazz pianists, including George Shearing, Erroll Garner, Bill Evans and Oscar Peterson. Hancock was also influenced by records of the vocal group the Hi-Lo's. In his words:

By the time I actually heard the Hi-Lo's, I started picking that stuff out; my ear was happening. I could hear stuff and that's when I really learned some much farther-out voicings – like the harmonies I used on Speak Like a Child – just being able to do that. I really got that from Clare Fischer's arrangements for the Hi-Lo's. Clare Fischer was a major influence on my harmonic concept... he and Bill Evans, and Ravel and Gil Evans, finally. You know, that's where it came from.

In 1960, Hancock heard Chris Anderson play just once and begged him to accept him as a student. Hancock often mentions Anderson as his harmonic guru.

Hancock graduated from Grinnell College in Grinnell, Iowa, in 1960, with degrees in electrical engineering and music. Hancock then moved back to Chicago, and began working with Donald Byrd and Coleman Hawkins. During this time, he also took courses at Roosevelt University. Grinnell also awarded him an honorary Doctor of Fine Arts degree in 1972. Byrd was attending the Manhattan School of Music in New York at the time and suggested that Hancock study composition with Vittorio Giannini (which he did for a short time in 1960). The pianist quickly earned a reputation, and played subsequent sessions with Oliver Nelson and Phil Woods. Hancock recorded his first solo album, Takin' Off, for Blue Note Records in 1962. "Watermelon Man" (from Takin' Off) was to provide Mongo Santamaría with a hit single, but more importantly for Hancock, Takin' Off caught the attention of Miles Davis, who was at that time assembling a new band. Hancock was introduced to Davis by the young drummer Tony Williams, a member of the new band.

== Career ==
=== Miles Davis Quintet (1963–1968) and Blue Note Records (1962–1969) ===
Hancock received considerable attention when, in May 1963, he joined Davis's Second Great Quintet. Davis personally sought out Hancock, whom he saw as one of the most promising talents in jazz. The rhythm section that Davis organized was young but effective, comprising bassist Ron Carter, 17-year-old drummer Tony Williams, and Hancock on piano. After George Coleman and Sam Rivers each took a turn at the saxophone spot, the quintet gelled with Wayne Shorter on tenor saxophone. This quintet is often regarded as one of the finest jazz ensembles yet.

While in Davis's band, Hancock also found time to record dozens of sessions for the Blue Note label, both under his own name and as a sideman with other musicians such as Wayne Shorter, Williams, Grant Green, Bobby Hutcherson, Rivers, Byrd, Kenny Dorham, Hank Mobley, Lee Morgan, Freddie Hubbard, and Eric Dolphy. Hancock also recorded several lesser known but still critically acclaimed albums with larger ensembles – My Point of View (1963), Speak Like a Child (1968) and The Prisoner (1969), albums that featured flugelhorn, alto flute and bass trombone in addition to the traditional jazz instrumentation. 1963's Inventions and Dimensions was an album of almost entirely improvised music, teaming Hancock with bassist Paul Chambers and two Latin percussionists, Willie Bobo and Osvaldo "Chihuahua" Martinez.

During that period, Hancock also composed the score to Michelangelo Antonioni's film Blowup (1966), the first of many film soundtracks he recorded in his career. As well as feature film soundtracks, Hancock recorded a number of musical themes used on American television commercials for such well-known products as Pillsbury's Space Food Sticks, Standard Oil, Tab diet cola, and Virginia Slims cigarettes. Hancock also wrote, arranged and conducted a spy type theme for a series of F. William Free commercials for Silva Thins cigarettes. Hancock liked it so much he wished to record it as a song but the ad agency would not let him. He rewrote the harmony, tempo and tone and recorded the piece as the track "He Who Lives in Fear" from his The Prisoner album of 1969.

Davis had begun incorporating elements of rock and popular music into his recordings by the end of Hancock's tenure with the band. Despite some initial reluctance, Hancock began doubling on electric keyboards, including the Fender Rhodes electric piano at Davis's insistence. Hancock adapted quickly to the new instruments, which proved to be important in his future artistic endeavors.

In the summer of 1968, after being dismissed from Davis' band under the pretext that he had returned late from a honeymoon in Brazil, Hancock formed his own sextet. Despite his departure from the band—which was disbanded soon after—Hancock continued to appear on Davis’ records for the next few years. His appearances included In a Silent Way, A Tribute to Jack Johnson, and On the Corner.

=== Fat Albert (1969) and Mwandishi era (1971–1973) ===
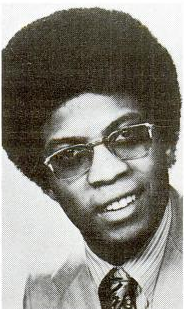
Hancock c. 1970

Hancock left Blue Note in 1969, signing with Warner Bros. Records. In 1969, Hancock composed the soundtrack for Bill Cosby's animated prime-time television special Hey, Hey, Hey, It's Fat Albert. Music from the soundtrack was later included on Fat Albert Rotunda (1969), an R&B-inspired album with strong jazz overtones. One of the jazzier songs on the record, the moody ballad "Tell Me a Bedtime Story", was later re-worked as a more electronic sounding song for the Quincy Jones album Sounds...and Stuff Like That!! (1978).

Hancock became fascinated with electronic musical instruments. Together with the profound influence of Davis's Bitches Brew (1970), this fascination culminated in a series of albums in which electronic instruments were coupled with acoustic instruments. Hancock's first ventures into electronic music started with a sextet comprising Hancock, bassist Buster Williams and drummer Billy Hart, and a trio of horn players: Eddie Henderson (trumpet), Julian Priester (trombone), and multireedist Bennie Maupin. Patrick Gleeson was eventually added to the mix to play and program the synthesizers.

The sextet, later a septet with the addition of Gleeson, made three albums under Hancock's name: Mwandishi (1971), Crossings (1972) (both on Warner Bros. Records), and Sextant (1973) (released on Columbia Records); two more, Realization and Inside Out, were recorded under Henderson's name with essentially the same personnel. The music exhibited strong improvisational aspect beyond the confines of jazz mainstream and showed influence from the electronic music of contemporary classical composers. Hancock's three records released in 1971–73 later became known as the "Mwandishi" albums, so-called after a Swahili name Hancock sometimes used during this era ("Mwandishi" is Swahili for "writer"). The first two, including Fat Albert Rotunda, were made available on the two-CD set Mwandishi: the Complete Warner Bros. Recordings, released in 1994. "Hornets" was later revised on the 2001 album Future2Future as "Virtual Hornets".

Among the instruments Hancock and Gleeson used were Fender Rhodes piano, ARP Odyssey, ARP 2600, ARP Pro Soloist Synthesizer, a Mellotron and the Moog synthesizer III.

=== From Head Hunters (1973) to Secrets (1976) ===
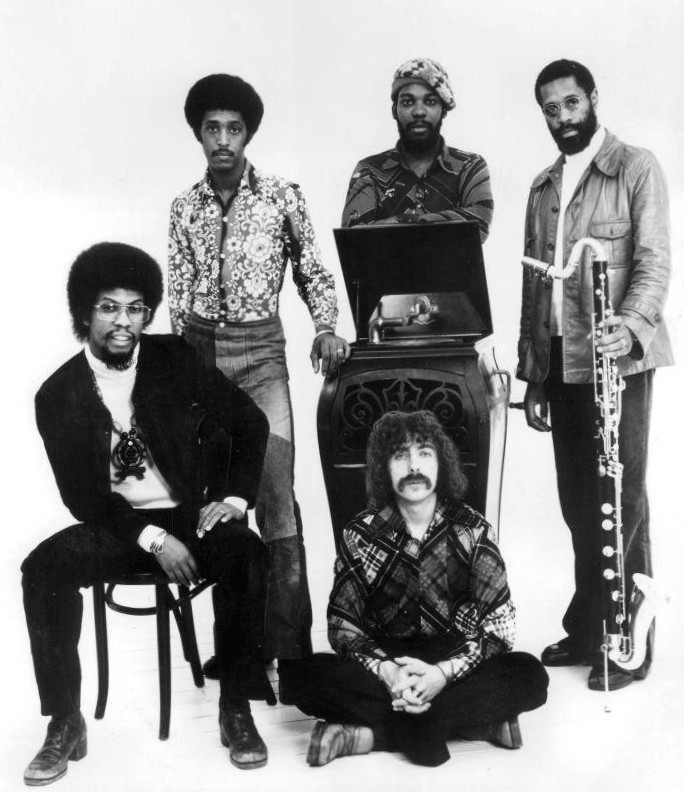
Hancock (left) with the Headhunters, 1975

Hancock formed the Headhunters, keeping only Maupin from the sextet and adding bassist Paul Jackson, percussionist Bill Summers, and drummer Harvey Mason. The album Head Hunters (1973) was a hit, crossing over to pop audiences but criticized within his jazz audience. Stephen Erlewine, in a retrospective summary for AllMusic, said, "Head Hunters still sounds fresh and vital three decades after its initial release, and its genre-bending proved vastly influential on not only jazz, but funk, soul, and hip-hop." Brian Case and Stan Britt dismissed the album as uninteresting in The Illustrated Encyclopedia of Jazz in 1978.

Drummer Mason was replaced by Mike Clark, and the band released a second album, Thrust, in 1974. (A live album from a Japan performance, consisting of compositions from those first two Head Hunters releases was released in 1975 as Flood). This was almost as well received as its predecessor, if not attaining the same level of commercial success. The Headhunters made another successful album called Survival of the Fittest in 1975 without Hancock, while Hancock himself started to make even more commercial albums, often featuring members of the band, but no longer billed as the Headhunters. The Headhunters reunited with Hancock in 1998 for Return of the Headhunters, and a version of the band (featuring Clark) continues to play and record.

In 1973, Hancock was commissioned to compose the soundtrack for the controversial film The Spook Who Sat by the Door, based on the novel of the same name by Sam Greenlee, who had grown up in the same neighborhood of Chicago as Hancock. In the following year, Hancock composed the soundtrack to the first Death Wish film. One of his songs, "Joanna's Theme", was re-recorded in 1997 on his duet album with Shorter, 1+1. Hancock's next jazz-funk albums of the 1970s were Man-Child (1975) and Secrets (1976), which point toward the more commercial direction Hancock would take over the next decade. These albums feature the members of the Headhunters band, but also a variety of other musicians in important roles.

=== From V.S.O.P. (1976) to Future Shock (1983) ===
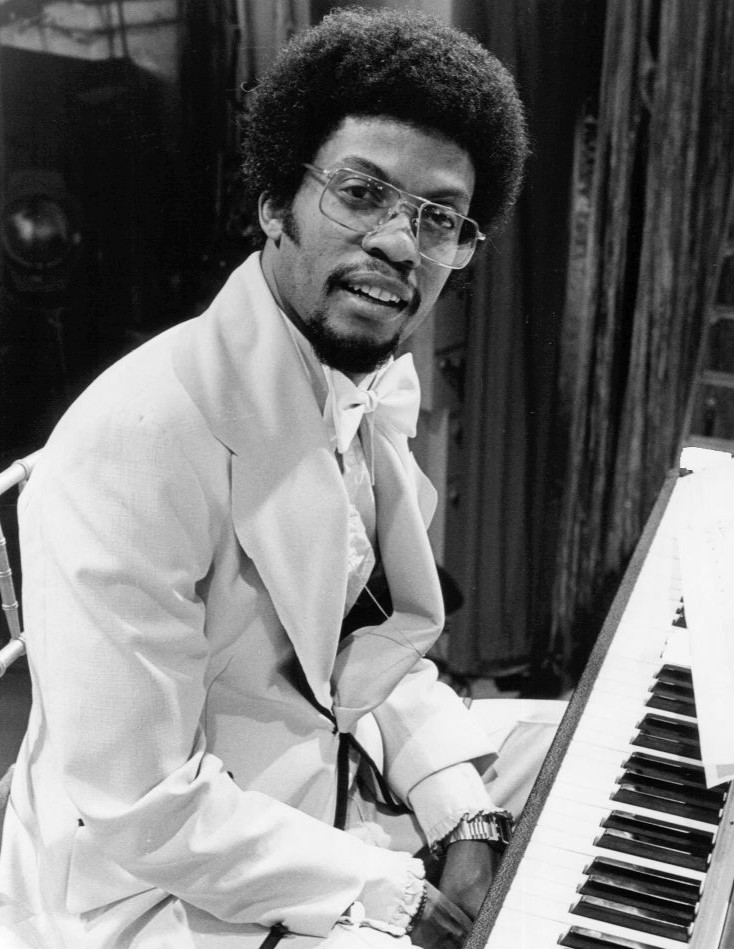
Hancock in 1976

In 1978, Hancock recorded a duet with Chick Corea, who replaced him in the Davis band a decade earlier. Hancock also released a solo acoustic piano album, The Piano (1979), which was released only in Japan. (It was released in the US in 2004). Other Japan-only albums include Dedication (1974), V.S.O.P.'s Tempest in the Colosseum (1977), and Direct Step (1978). In 1977, after what one critic called due to "perhaps pangs of conscience," he formed VSOP with the Miles Davis classic quintet with Freddie Hubbard in Miles' role. The album The Quintet was recorded live and released to critical acclaim. VSOP: Live Under the Sky was a VSOP album remastered for the US in 2004 and included a second concert from the tour in July 1979.

From 1978 to 1982, Hancock recorded many albums of jazz-inflected disco and pop music, beginning with Sunlight (featuring guest musicians including Williams and Pastorius on the last track) (1978). Singing through a vocoder, he earned a British hit, "I Thought It Was You", although critics were unimpressed. This led to more vocoder on his next album, Feets, Don't Fail Me Now (1979), which gave him another UK hit in "You Bet Your Love".

Hancock toured with Williams and Carter in 1981, recording Herbie Hancock Trio, a five-track album released only in Japan. A month later, he recorded Quartet with trumpeter Wynton Marsalis, released in the US the following year. Hancock, Williams, and Carter toured internationally with Wynton Marsalis and his brother, saxophonist Branford Marsalis, in what was known as "VSOP II". This quintet can be heard on Wynton Marsalis's debut album on Columbia (1981). In 1984 VSOP II performed at the Playboy Jazz Festival as a sextet with Hancock, Williams, Carter, the Marsalis Brothers, and Bobby McFerrin. In 1982, Hancock contributed to the album New Gold Dream (81,82,83,84) by Simple Minds, playing a synthesizer solo on the track "Hunter and the Hunted".

In 1983, Hancock had a pop hit with the Grammy Award-winning single "Rockit" from the album Future Shock. It was the first jazz hip-hop song and became a worldwide anthem for breakdancers and for hip-hop in the 1980s. It was the first mainstream single to feature scratching, and also featured an innovative animated music video, which was directed by Godley and Creme and showed several robot-like artworks by Jim Whiting. The video was a hit on MTV and reached No. 8 in the UK. The video won in five categories at the inaugural MTV Video Music Awards. This single ushered in a collaboration with noted bassist and producer Bill Laswell. Hancock experimented with electronic music on a string of three LPs produced by Laswell: Future Shock (1983), the Grammy Award-winning Sound-System (1984), and Perfect Machine (1988).

During that period he appeared onstage at the Grammy Awards with Stevie Wonder, Howard Jones, and Thomas Dolby, in a synthesizer jam. Lesser known works from the 1980s are the live album Jazz Africa (1987) and the studio album Village Life (1984), which were recorded with Gambian kora player Foday Musa Suso. In 1985, Hancock performed as a guest on the album So Red the Rose (1985) by the Duran Duran spinoff group Arcadia. He also provided introductory and closing comments for the PBS rebroadcast in the United States of the BBC educational series from the mid-1980s, Rockschool (not to be confused with the most recent Gene Simmons' Rock School series).

In 1986, Hancock performed and acted in the film Round Midnight. He also wrote the score/soundtrack, for which he won an Academy Award for Original Music Score. His film work was prolific during the 1980s, and included the scores to A Soldier's Story (1984), Jo Jo Dancer, Your Life Is Calling (1986), Action Jackson (1988 with Michael Kamen), Colors (1988), and the Eddie Murphy comedy Harlem Nights (1989). He would also write music for television commercials, with "Maiden Voyage" starting out as a cologne advertisement. At the end of the Perfect Machine tour, Hancock decided to leave Columbia Records after a 15-plus-year relationship.

=== 1990s to 2000 ===
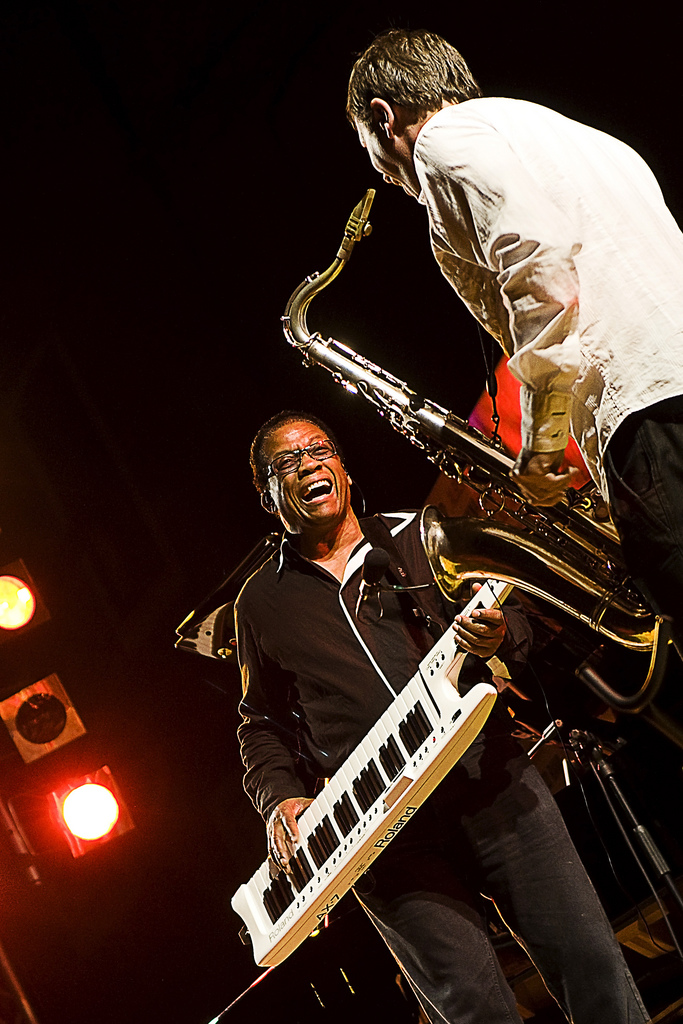
Hancock playing keytar in La Spezia, Italy, July 2008

The departure led to a hiatus from recording and the release of several compilations during the first half of the 1990s. He returned with Carter, Williams, Shorter, and Davis admirer Wallace Roney to record A Tribute to Miles, which was released in 1994. The album contained two live recordings and studio recording songs, with Roney playing Davis's part as trumpet player. The album won a Grammy for best group album. Hancock also toured with Jack DeJohnette, Dave Holland, and Pat Metheny in 1990 on their Parallel Realities tour which included a performance at the Montreux Jazz Festival in July 1990, and scored the 1991 comedy film Livin' Large, which starred Terrence C. Carson.

Hancock's next album, Dis Is da Drum, released in 1994 is a return to acid jazz. Also in 1994, he appeared on the Red Hot Organization's compilation album Stolen Moments: Red Hot + Cool. The album, meant to raise awareness and funds in support of the AIDS epidemic in relation to the African-American community, was heralded as "Album of the Year" by Time magazine. In 1995, the release of The New Standard had Hancock and an all-star band that included John Scofield, DeJohnette and Michael Brecker, interpreting pop songs by Nirvana, Stevie Wonder, the Beatles, Prince, Peter Gabriel, and others.

A 1997 duet album with Shorter, 1+1, was successful; the song "Aung San Suu Kyi" winning the Grammy Award for Best Instrumental Composition. Hancock also achieved great success in 1998 with his album Gershwin's World, which featured readings of George and Ira Gershwin standards by Hancock and a plethora of guest stars, including Stevie Wonder, Joni Mitchell and Shorter. Hancock toured the world in support of Gershwin's World with a sextet featuring Cyro Baptista, Terri Lynne Carrington, Ira Coleman, Eli Degibri, and Eddie Henderson.

=== 2000 to 2009 ===
In 2001, Hancock recorded Future2Future, which reunited Hancock with Laswell and featured doses of electronica as well as turntablist Rob Swift of the X-Ecutioners. Hancock later toured with the band, and released a concert DVD with a different lineup, which also included the "Rockit" music video. Also in 2001 Hancock partnered with Brecker and Roy Hargrove to record a live concert album saluting Davis and John Coltrane, Directions in Music: Live at Massey Hall, recorded live in Toronto. The threesome toured to support the album, and toured on-and-off through 2005.

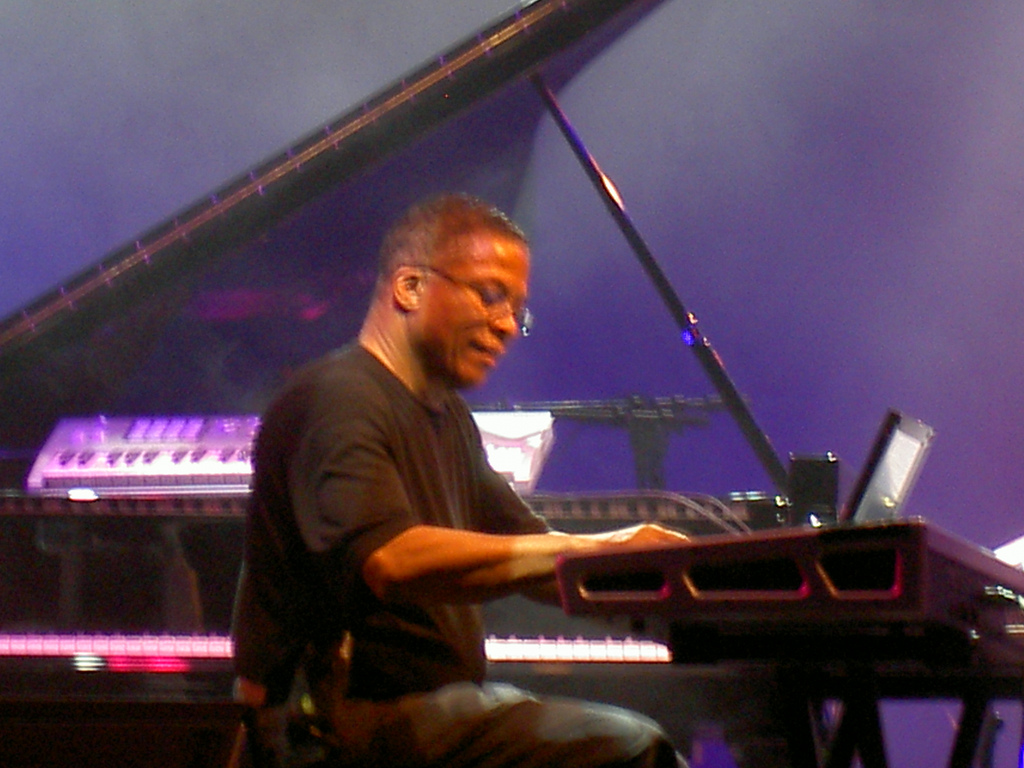
Hancock performing at the Tollwood Festival in Munich, Germany, July 2006

A duet album called Possibilities was released in 2005. It featured duets with Carlos Santana, Paul Simon, Annie Lennox, John Mayer, Christina Aguilera, Sting, and others. In 2006, Possibilities received nominations for Grammy Awards in two categories: "A Song for You" (featuring Aguilera) was nominated for a Grammy Award for Best Pop Instrumental Performance, and "Gelo No Montanha" (featuring Trey Anastasio on guitar) was nominated for a Grammy Award for Best Instrumental Performance, although neither nomination resulted in an award.

Also in 2005, Hancock toured Europe with a new quartet that included Beninese guitarist Lionel Loueke and explored textures ranging from ambient to straight jazz to African music. During the summer, Hancock re-staffed the Headhunters and went on tour with them, including a performance at the Bonnaroo Music and Arts Festival. The lineup did not consist of any of the original Headhunters musicians. The group included Marcus Miller, Carrington, Loueke, and Mayer. Hancock also served as the first artist in residence for Bonnaroo in Manchester, Tennessee, that summer.

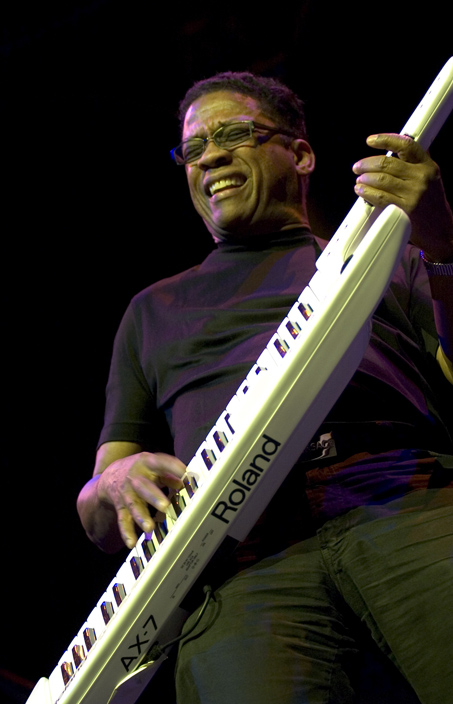
Hancock playing a Roland AX-7 keytar, at The Roundhouse in Camden, London, November 2006

In 2006, Sony BMG Music Entertainment (which bought out Hancock's old label, Columbia Records) released the two-disc retrospective The Essential Herbie Hancock. This set was the first compilation of his work at Warner Bros., Blue Note, Columbia and Verve/Polygram. This became Hancock's second major compilation of work since the 2002 Columbia-only The Herbie Hancock Box, which was released at first in a plastic 4 × 4 cube then re-released in 2004 in a long box set. Also in 2006, Hancock recorded a new song with Josh Groban and Eric Mouquet (co-founder of Deep Forest), "Machine", which featured on Groban's album Awake. Hancock also recorded and improvised with guitarist Loueke on Loueke's 1996 debut album Virgin Forest, on the ObliqSound label, resulting in two improvisational tracks – "Le Réveil des agneaux (The Awakening of the Lambs)" and "La Poursuite du lion (The Lion's Pursuit)".

Hancock, a longtime associate and friend of Joni Mitchell, released a 2007 album, River: The Joni Letters, that paid tribute to her work, with Norah Jones, Tina Turner, and Corinne Bailey Rae adding vocals to the album. Leonard Cohen contributed a spoken piece set to Hancock's piano. Mitchell herself also made an appearance. The album was released on September 25, 2007, simultaneously with the release of Mitchell's album Shine. River won the 2008 Album of the Year Grammy Award. The album also won a Grammy for Best Contemporary Jazz Album, and the song "Both Sides Now" was nominated for Best Instrumental Jazz Solo, which made it only the second time in history that a jazz album won those two Grammy Awards.

On June 14, 2008, Hancock performed with others at Rhythm on the Vine at the South Coast Winery in Temecula, California for Shriners Hospitals for Children. The event raised $515,000 for Shriners Hospital. On January 18, 2009, Hancock performed at the We Are One concert, marking the start of inaugural celebrations for American President Barack Obama. Hancock also performed Rhapsody in Blue at the 2009 Classical BRIT Awards with classical pianist Lang Lang. Hancock was named as the Los Angeles Philharmonic's creative chair for jazz for 2010–12.

=== 2010 to present ===
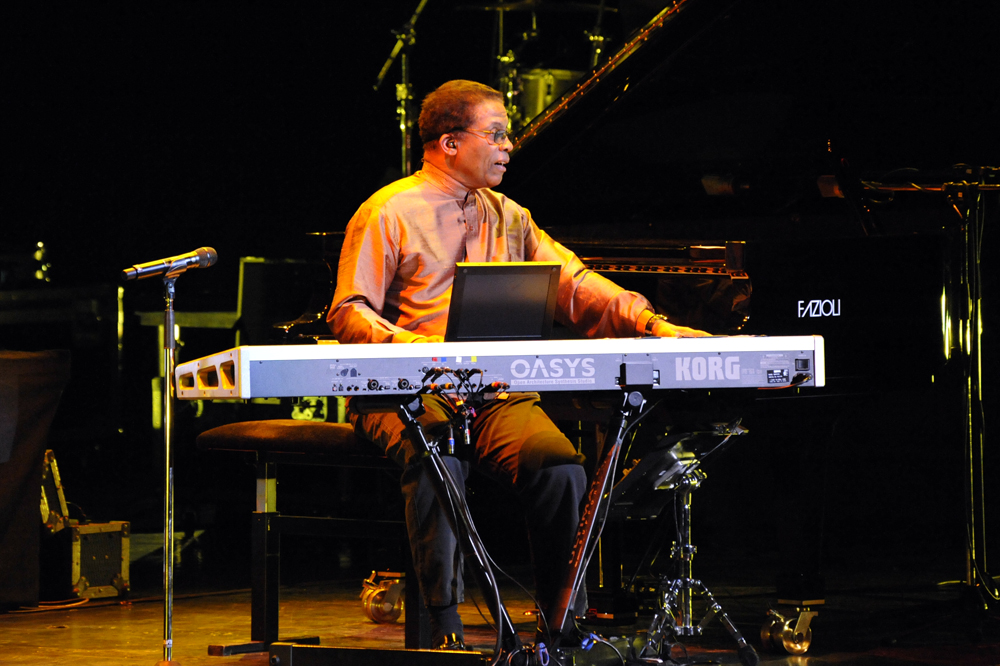
Hancock in Warsaw, Poland with his Imagine Project, November 2010

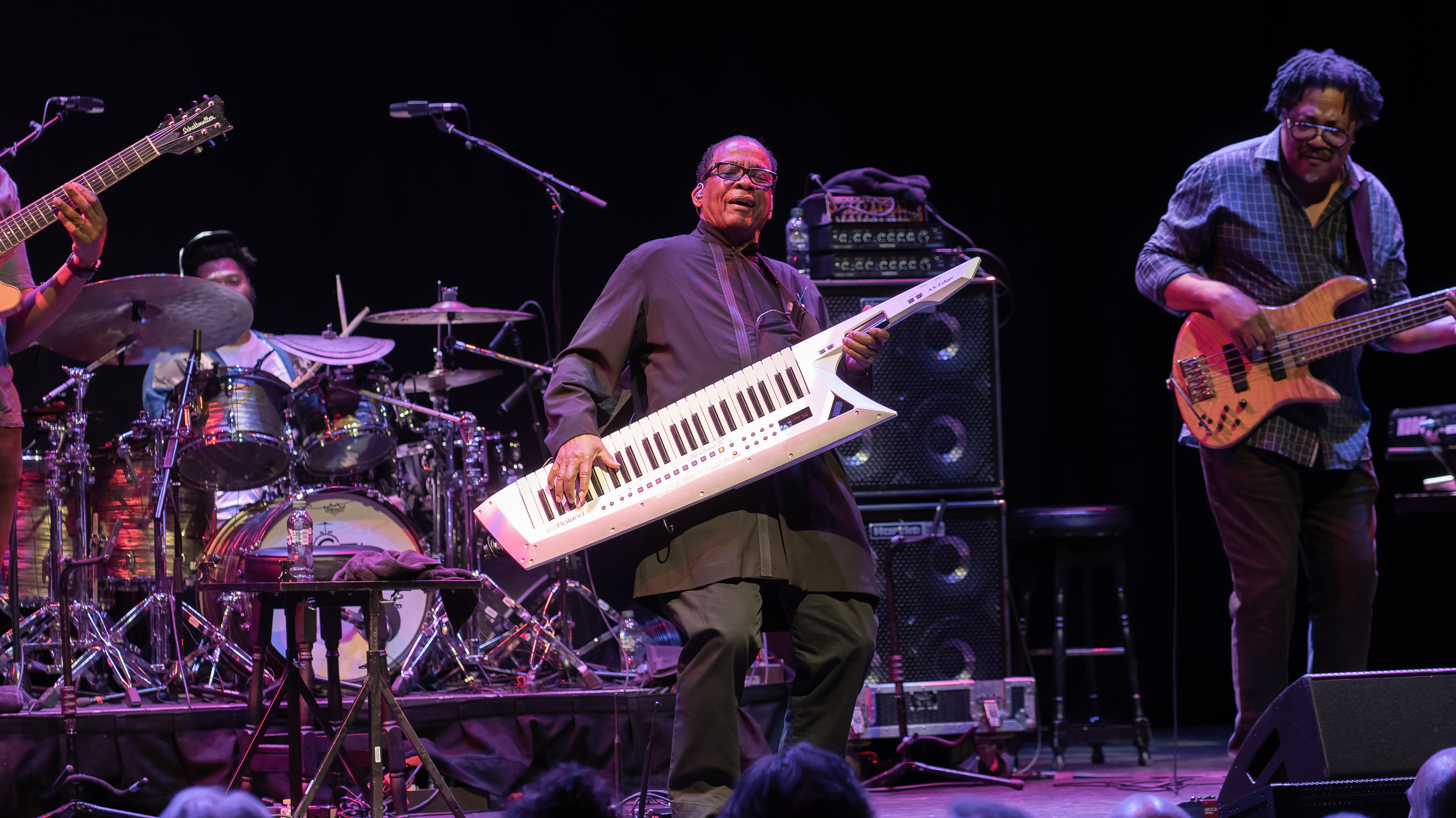
Hancock at the Barbican Centre in London, July 2023

In June 2010, Hancock released The Imagine Project. On June 5, 2010, he received an Alumni Award from his alma mater Grinnell College. On July 22, 2011, at a ceremony in Paris, he was named UNESCO Goodwill Ambassador for the promotion of Intercultural Dialogue. In 2013, Hancock joined the University of California, Los Angeles faculty as a professor in the UCLA music department teaching jazz music.

In a June 2010 interview with Michael Gallant of Keyboard magazine, Hancock talks about his Fazioli giving him inspiration to do things. On December 8, 2013, Hancock was given the Kennedy Center Honors Award for achievement in the performing arts. Terence Blanchard was the musical director and arranged Hancock compositions for performances with artists like Wayne Shorter, Joshua Redman, Vinnie Colaiuta, Lionel Loueke, and Aaron Parks. Snoop Dogg performed a mash-up of the US3 arrangement of Hancock's "Cantaloupe Island" and his own "Gin and Juice". Mixmaster Mike from the Beastie Boys was featured on a rendition of Hancock's "Rockit".

Hancock appeared on the album You're Dead! by Flying Lotus, released in October 2014. He was the 2014 Charles Eliot Norton Professor of Poetry at Harvard University. Holders of the chair deliver a series of six lectures on poetry, "The Norton Lectures", poetry being "interpreted in the broadest sense, including all poetic expression in language, music, or fine arts". Previous Norton lecturers include musicians Leonard Bernstein, Igor Stravinsky, and John Cage. Hancock's theme is "The Ethics of Jazz".

Hancock's next album is being produced by Terrace Martin, and will feature a broad variety of jazz and hip-hop artists including Wayne Shorter, Kendrick Lamar, Kamasi Washington, Thundercat, Flying Lotus, Lionel Loueke, Zakir Hussein, and Snoop Dogg. On May 15, 2015, Hancock received an honorary doctor of humane letters degree from Washington University in St. Louis. On May 19, 2018, he received an honorary degree from Rensselaer Polytechnic Institute. On June 26, 2022, he performed at the Glastonbury Festival. He was featured on the track "MOON" by the jazz duo Domi and JD Beck on their debut album NOT TiGHT, released July 29, 2022. On February 4, 2023, he performed at the Arise Fashion Week & Jazz Festival at Eko Hotel in Lagos, Nigeria.

On February 27, 2025, Hancock was one of the 2025 laureates for the Polar Music Prize, awarded in Stockholm, Sweden.

== Personal life ==
Hancock has been married to Gigi Hancock (née Meixner) since 1968 and the couple has a daughter. In a 2019 interview, Herbie said: "Gigi is very compassionate. She really cares about other people. She spends most of her time helping her friends. She has a big heart. At the same time she won't let you get away with anything. If you try to sneak something past her, she'll call you on it in a second. She got me into the pop art scene in New York in the 1960s and I introduced her to my jazz world."

In 1985, Hancock's sister, Jean, a computer consultant and a lyricist who wrote for him; Earth, Wind & Fire; Dianne Reeves; and Booker T. & the M.G.'s, was killed in the crash of Delta Air Lines Flight 191.

In his memoir Possibilities, written with Lisa Dickey and published in 2014, Hancock revealed that he had previously battled an addiction to crack cocaine, in the 1990s, and that his wife and daughter helped him get sober: "This was an intervention, and I was so embarrassed, but there was another feeling creeping in, too: relief. I had been struggling with this habit, and this secret, for so long. I looked at my daughter and sobbed, wondering how I had gotten to this place but thankful that it was finally going to end". Since 1972, Hancock has practiced Nichiren Buddhism as a member of the Buddhist association Soka Gakkai International. Part of Hancock's spiritual practice is to recite the Buddhist chant Nam Myoho Renge Kyo each day. In 2013, Hancock's dialogue with musician Wayne Shorter and Soka Gakkai International president Daisaku Ikeda on jazz, Buddhism and life was published in Japanese and English, then in French. In 2014, Hancock delivered a lecture at Harvard University titled "Buddhism and Creativity" as part of his Norton Lecture series.

=== Cobra automobile ownership ===
In 1963, at the age of 23, Hancock purchased a new 1963 AC Shelby Cobra from a dealership in New York City for $6,000. He is still its owner and thus the longest owner of a Cobra. The car, serial number CSX2006, was the sixth Cobra ever produced, making it a rare and valuable vehicle. It is one of only 75 Cobras originally produced with a 260 cubic-inch engine and the only Cobra ever equipped with a two-barrel carburetor. The car has been estimated to be worth more than $2 million. Hancock plans to give the car to his grandson.

== Discography ==
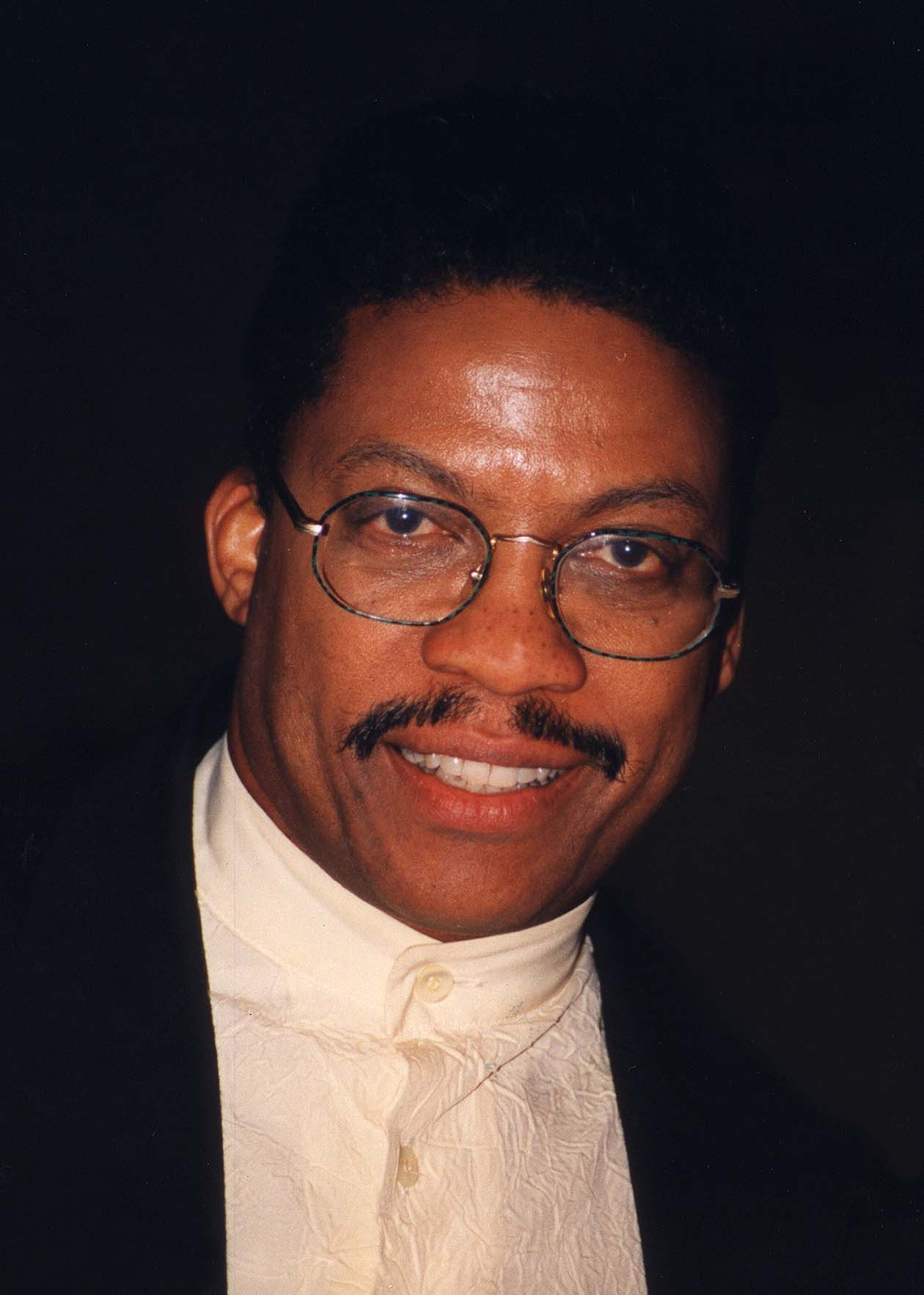
Hancock in Washington, D.C., 1999

=== Studio albums ===
- Takin' Off (1962)
- My Point of View (1963)
- Inventions & Dimensions (1964)
- Empyrean Isles (1964)
- Maiden Voyage (1965)
- Speak Like a Child (1968)
- The Prisoner (1969)
- Fat Albert Rotunda (1969)
- Mwandishi (1971)
- Crossings (1972)
- Sextant (1973)
- Head Hunters (1973)
- Dedication (1974)
- Thrust (1974)
- Man-Child (1975)
- Secrets (1976)
- Third Plane (1977)
- Herbie Hancock Trio (1977)
- Sunlight (1978)
- Directstep (1979)
- The Piano (1979)
- Feets, Don't Fail Me Now (1979)
- Monster (1980)
- Mr. Hands (1980)
- Magic Windows (1981)
- Herbie Hancock Trio (1982)
- Quartet (1982)
- Lite Me Up (1982)
- Future Shock (1983)
- Sound-System (1984)
- Village Life (1985)
- Perfect Machine (1988)
- A Tribute to Miles (1994)
- Dis Is da Drum (1994)
- The New Standard (1996)
- 1+1 (1997)
- Gershwin's World (1998)
- Future 2 Future (2001)
- Possibilities (2005)
- River: The Joni Letters (2007)
- The Imagine Project (2010)

== Filmography ==
Year	Title	Role	Notes
1981	Concrete Cowboys	Gideon	Episode: "The Wind Bags"
1985	The New Mike Hammer	Himself	Episode: "Firestorm"
1986	Round Midnight	Eddie Wayne	Also producer of the original motion pictures soundtrack
1988	Branford Marsalis Steep	Himself	
1993	Indecent Proposal	Himself	
1995	Invisible Universe	Poetry reader (voice)	Video game
2002	Hitters	District Attorney	
2006	Herbie Hancock: Possibilities	Himself	Documentary
2014	Girl Meets World	Catfish Willie Slim	Episode: "Girl Meets Brother"
2015	Miles Ahead	Himself	
2016	River of Gold	Narrator	Documentary
2017	Valerian and the City of a Thousand Planets	Defense Minister	
2025	Tuner	Himself	

== Concert films ==
- 2000: DeJohnette, Hancock, Holland and Metheny – Live in Concert
- 2002: Herbie Hancock Trio: Hurricane! with Ron Carter and Billy Cobham
- 2002: The Jazz Channel Presents Herbie Hancock (BET on Jazz) with Cyro Baptista, Terri Lynne Carrington, Ira Coleman, Eli Degibri and Eddie Henderson (recorded in 2000)
- 2004: Herbie Hancock – Future2Future Live
- 2005: Herbie Hancock's Headhunters Watermelon Man (Live in Japan)
- 2006: Herbie Hancock – Possibilities with John Mayer, Christina Aguilera, Joss Stone, and more

== Books ==
- Herbie Hancock: Possibilities (2014), ISBN 978-0-670-01471-2
- Reaching Beyond: Improvisations on Jazz, Buddhism, and a Joyful Life (2017), ISBN 978-1-938-25276-1

== Awards ==
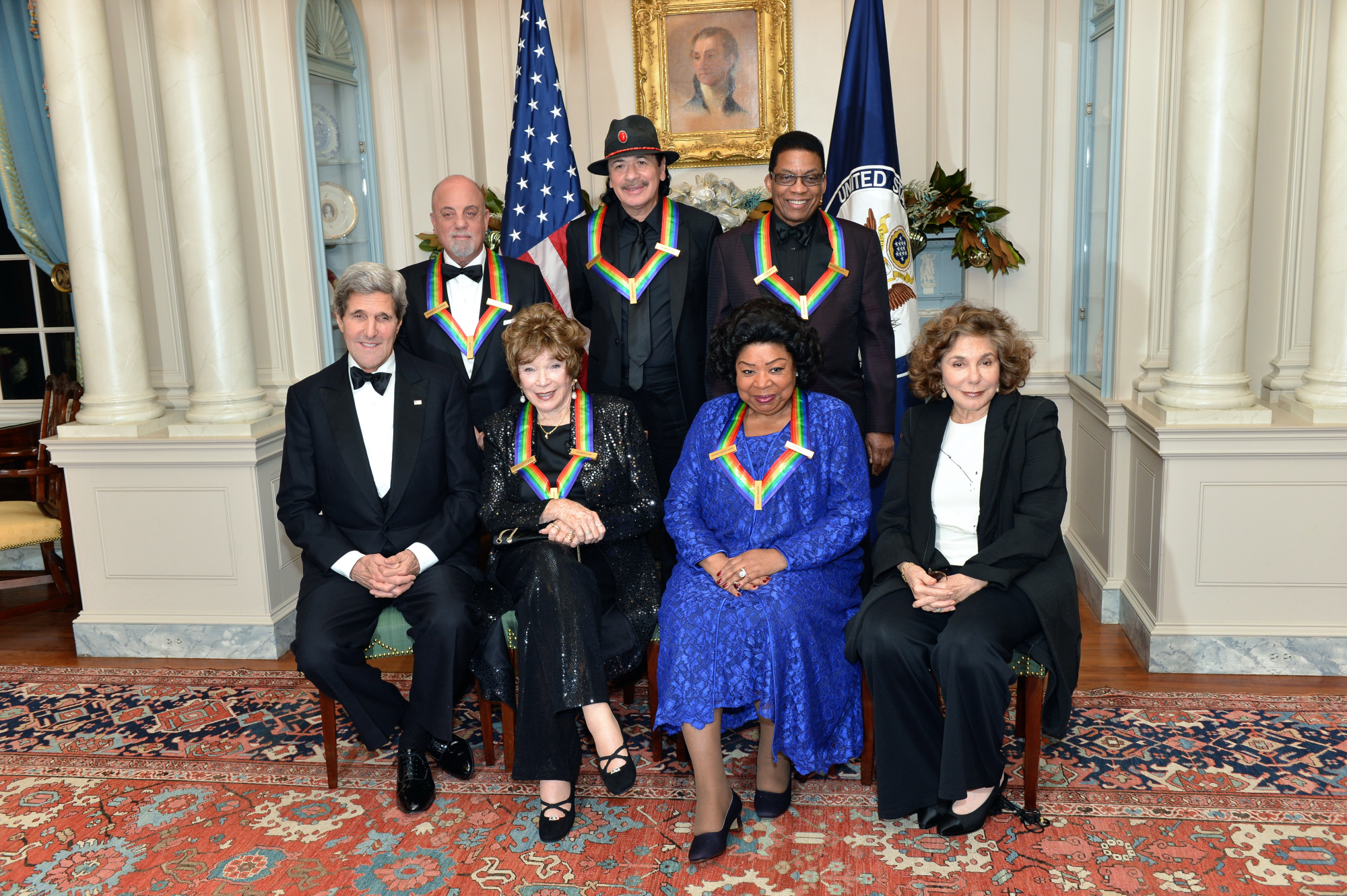
U.S. Secretary of State John Kerry and Teresa Heinz Kerry pose for a photo with the 2013 Kennedy Center honorees – Shirley MacLaine, Martina Arroyo, Billy Joel, Carlos Santana, and Herbie Hancock at the U.S. Department of State in Washington, D.C., on December 7, 2013

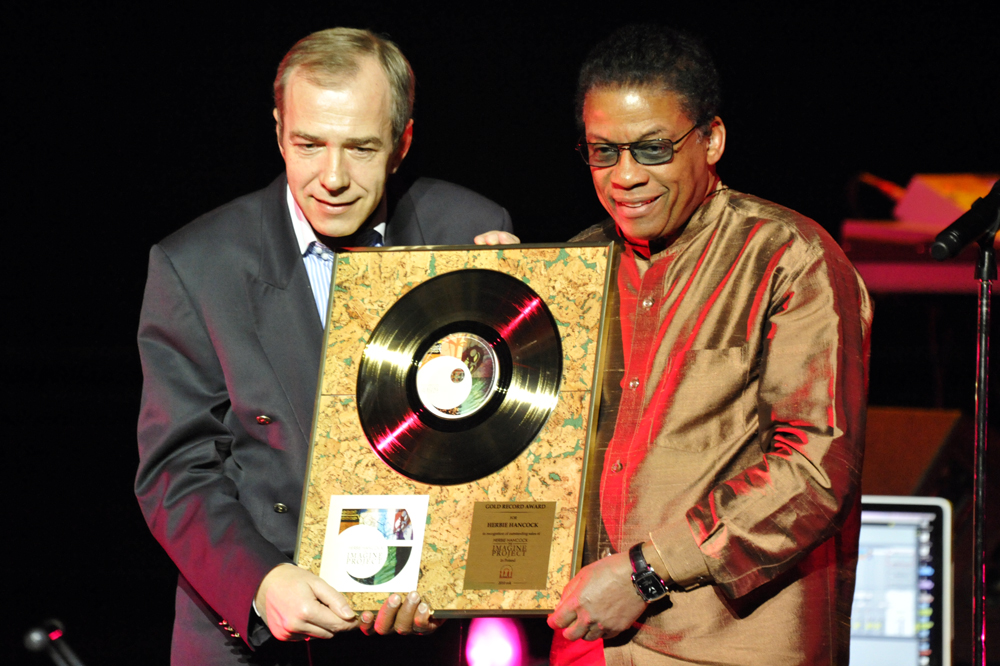
Hancock presented with Gold Record Award by Kazimierz Pułaski of Sony Music Poland, November 29, 2011

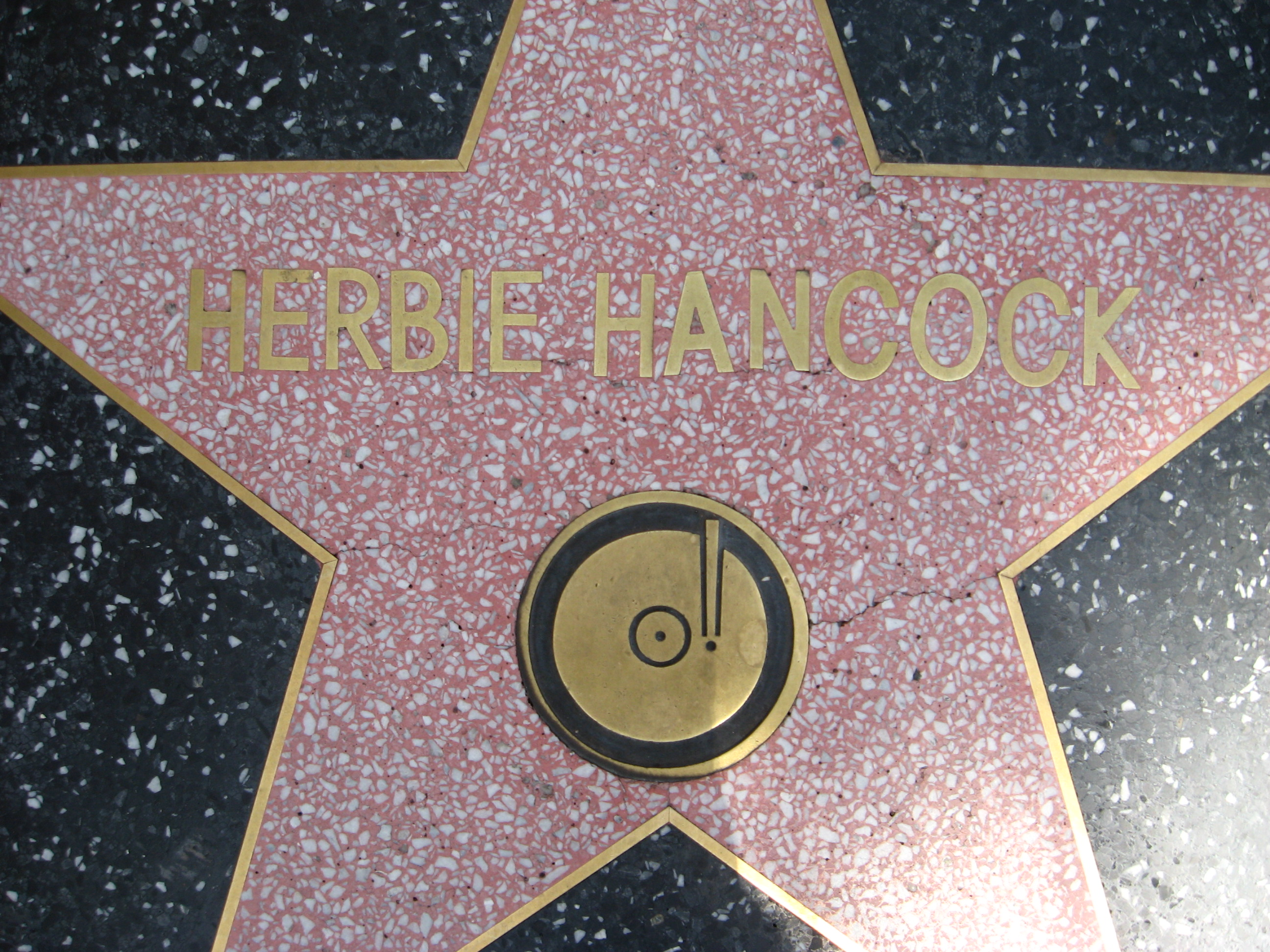
Herbie Hancock star on Hollywood Walk of Fame

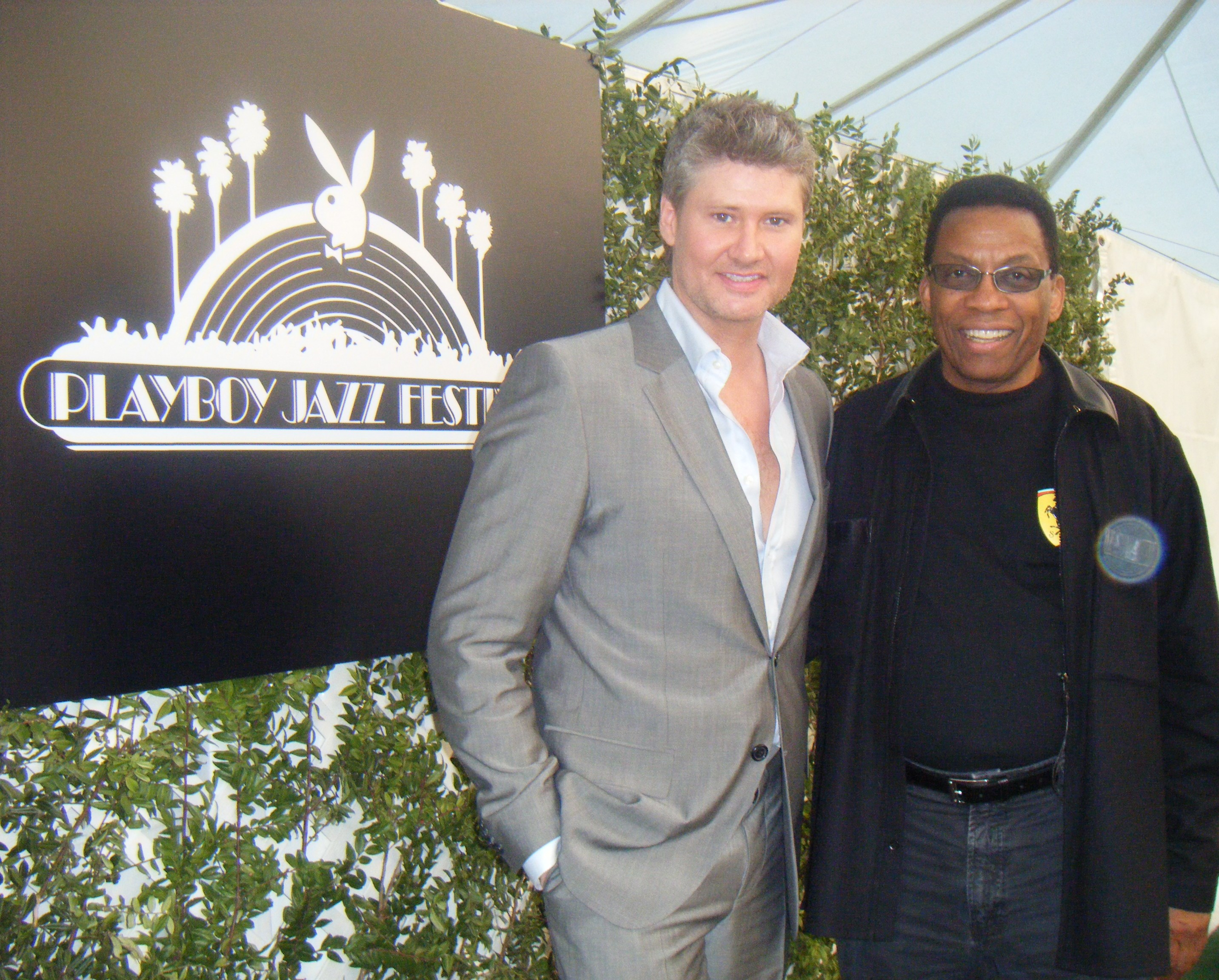
Michael Lington and Hancock at the entrance of the Playboy Jazz Festival

=== Academy Awards ===
- 1986, Best Original Score, for Round Midnight

=== Grammy Awards ===
- 1984: Best R&B Instrumental Performance, for Rockit
- 1985: Best R&B Instrumental Performance, for Sound-System
- 1988: Best Instrumental Composition, for Call Sheet Blues
- 1995: Best Jazz Instrumental Performance, Individual or Group, for A Tribute to Miles
- 1997: Best Instrumental Composition, for Manhattan (Island of Lights and Love)
- 1999: Best Instrumental Arrangement Accompanying Vocal(s), for St. Louis Blues
- 1999: Best Jazz Instrumental Performance, Individual or Group, for Gershwin's World
- 2003: Best Jazz Instrumental Album, Individual or Group, for Directions in Music at Massey Hall
- 2003: Best Jazz Instrumental Solo, for My Ship
- 2005: Best Jazz Instrumental Solo, for Speak Like a Child
- 2008: Album of the Year, for River: The Joni Letters
- 2008: Best Contemporary Jazz Album, for River: The Joni Letters
- 2011: Best Improvised Jazz Solo, for A Change Is Gonna Come
- 2011: Best Pop Collaboration with Vocals, for Imagine

=== Other awards ===
- Keyboard Readers' Poll: Best Jazz Pianist (1987, 1988); Keyboardist (1983, 1987)
- Playboy Music Poll: Best Jazz Group (1985), Best Jazz Album Rockit (1985), Best Jazz Keyboards (1985, 1986), Best R&B Instrumentalist (1987), Best Jazz Instrumentalist (1988)
- MTV Awards (5), Best Concept Video, "Rockit", 1983–'84
- Gold Note Jazz Awards – New York Chapter of the National Black MBA Association, 1985
- French Award Officer of the Order of Arts & Letters, 1985
- BMI Film Music Award, Round Midnight, 1986
- Honorary Doctorate of Music from Berklee College of Music, 1986
- U.S. Radio Award, Best Original Music Scoring – Thom McAnn Shoes, 1986
- Los Angeles Film Critics Association, Best Score – 'Round Midnight, 1986
- BMI Film Music Award, Colors, 1989
- Miles Davis Award, Montreal International Jazz Festival, 1997
- Soul Train Music Award for Best Jazz Album – The New Standard, 1997
- VH1's 100 Greatest Videos, "Rockit" is 10th Greatest Video, 2001
- NEA Jazz Masters Award, 2004
- Downbeat Readers' Poll Hall of Fame, 2005
- Kennedy Center Honors, 2013
- Benjamin Franklin Medal (Royal Society of Arts), 2018
- Honorary Doctorate from Princeton University, 2026

=== Memberships ===
- American Academy of Arts and Sciences, 2013
- Foreign member of the Royal Swedish Academy of Music.
