= The Best of Allan Holdsworth: Against the Clock =

Greatest hits album by Allan Holdsworth
- Released: 17 May 2005
- Recorded: 1983–2001 at various locations
- Genre: Jazz fusion
- Length: 128:55
- Label: Universal Music
- Producer: Allan Holdsworth, Chad Wackerman, Derek Wilson, Christopher Hoard

Allan Holdsworth chronology
Then! (2003)	The Best of Allan Holdsworth: Against the Clock (2005)

Professional ratings
Review scores
Source	Rating
AllMusic	4/5 stars

The Best of Allan Holdsworth: Against the Clock is a double compilation album by guitarist Allan Holdsworth, released on 17 May 2005 through Universal Music (Japan), Alternity Records (US) and JMS–Cream Records (Europe). The second disc contains predominantly SynthAxe-based compositions, which formed the basis of much of Holdsworth's recordings in the late 1980s and 1990s.

== Track listing ==
=== Disc one ===
No.	Title	Writer(s)	Original album	Length
1.	"Tokyo Dream" (Japanese version)	Allan Holdsworth	Wardenclyffe Tower	5:04
2.	"Sphere of Innocence"	Holdsworth	Wardenclyffe Tower	5:58
3.	"Ruhkukah"	Holdsworth	Hard Hat Area	5:32
4.	"Low Levels, High Stakes"	Holdsworth	Hard Hat Area	9:02
5.	"How Deep Is the Ocean?"	Irving Berlin	None Too Soon	5:28
6.	"Nuages"	Django Reinhardt	None Too Soon	5:37
7.	"Devil Take the Hindmost"	Holdsworth	Metal Fatigue	5:34
8.	"Home"	Holdsworth	Metal Fatigue	5:26
9.	"Peril Premonition"	Chad Wackerman	Secrets	4:43
10.	"The Sixteen Men of Tain"	Holdsworth	The Sixteen Men of Tain	6:23
11.	"Mr. Berwell"	Holdsworth	Atavachron	6:09
12.	"Looking Glass"	Holdsworth	Atavachron	4:25
13.	"Pud Wud"	Holdsworth	Sand	6:40
Total length:				76:01

=== Disc two ===
No.	Title	Writer(s)	Original album	Length
1.	"Spokes"	Holdsworth	Secrets	3:44
2.	"Distance vs. Desire"	Holdsworth	Sand	5:31
3.	"Mac Man"	Holdsworth	Sand	5:24
4.	"Against the Clock" (lyrics by Naomi Star)	Holdsworth	Wardenclyffe Tower	4:31
5.	"Eeny Meeny"	Holdsworth	Flat Tire: Music for a Non-Existent Movie	3:54
6.	"Secrets" (lyrics by Rowanne Mark)	Holdsworth	Secrets	3:28
7.	"Bo Peep"	Holdsworth	Flat Tire: Music for a Non-Existent Movie	3:15
8.	"Postlude"	Holdsworth, Steve Hunt, Skúli Sverrisson, Gary Husband	Hard Hat Area	4:20
9.	"All Our Yesterdays" (lyrics by Mark)	Holdsworth	Atavachron	4:39
10.	"Eidolon"	Holdsworth	The Sixteen Men of Tain	3:30
11.	"Sundays"	Holdsworth	With a Heart in My Song	3:55
12.	"Let's Throw Shrimp" (bonus track)	Holdsworth, Wackerman, Jimmy Johnson		3:28
13.	"Shenandoah" (bonus track)	(traditional)		3:15
Total length:				52:54

== Personnel ==
- Allan Holdsworth – guitar, SynthAxe, spoken vocals (track 9), production
- Naomi Star – vocals (track 17)
- Rowanne Mark – vocals (tracks 19, 22)
- Steve Hunt – keyboard (tracks 2–4, 21)
- Chad Wackerman – keyboard (track 9), drums (tracks 1, 7–9, 16, 22, 25), production
- Alan Pasqua – keyboard (tracks 11, 13)
- William Edward Childs – keyboard (track 12)
- Gordon Beck – digital piano (tracks 5, 6)
- Gary Husband – drums (tracks 2–4, 11, 13, 21
- Kirk Covington – drums (tracks 5, 6)
- Gary Novak – drums (tracks 10, 23)
- Tony Williams – drums (track 12)
- Vinnie Colaiuta – drums (tracks 14, 17, 19)
- Jimmy Johnson – bass (tracks 1, 2, 7, 8, 11–14, 17, 19, 22, 25)
- Skúli Sverrisson – bass (tracks 3, 4, 21)
- Gary Willis – bass (tracks 5, 6)
- Bob Wackerman – bass (track 9)
- Dave Carpenter – bass (tracks 10, 18, 20, 23)
- Biff Vincent – Roland Octapad (track 16)
- Claire Holdsworth – spoken vocals (track 9)
- Jeffrey Ocheltree – sound effects (track 9)
- John England – sound effects (track 16)
- Derek Wilson – executive production
- Christopher Hoard – executive production
