= The Man Who Changed Guitar Forever! The Allan Holdsworth Album Collection =

Box set by Allan Holdsworth
- Released: 7 April 2017
- Recorded: 1982–2003
- Genre: Jazz fusion
- Length: 519:33
- Label: Manifesto Records

Allan Holdsworth chronology
Eidolon: The Allan Holdsworth Collection (2017)	The Man Who Changed Guitar Forever! The Allan Holdsworth Album Collection (2017)	Live in Japan 1984 (2018)

Professional ratings
Review scores
Source	Rating
All About Jazz	5/5 stars

The Man Who Changed Guitar Forever! The Allan Holdsworth Album Collection is a box set by the English jazz fusion guitarist Allan Holdsworth. It was released by Manifesto Records on 7 April 2017.

The 12-CD collection contains remastered versions of 11 studio albums and a live album, along with a 40-page booklet by Christopher Hoard. In one of his last interviews, Holdsworth spoke to DownBeat magazine and explained that the title of the collection was not his idea, but also added that he was very pleased with the quality of the remastered tracks by Manifesto Records.

== Reception ==
All About Jazz awarded the box set with 5 out of 5 stars. In the review by John Kelman, he describes the remastering as "wonderful; brighter and punchier, without sacrificing, as some remasters do, the music's all-important dynamics, they also avoid losing the gentle elegance and diaphanous nature of some of Holdsworth's best ballads".

== Album listing ==
The Man Who Changed Guitar Forever! The Allan Holdsworth Album Collection includes the following 12 albums remastered by Manifesto Records:

1. I.O.U. (1982)
2. Road Games (1983)
3. Metal Fatigue (1985)
4. Atavachron (1986)
5. Sand (1987)
6. Secrets (1989)
7. Wardenclyffe Tower (1992, 2007 Japanese Edition)
8. Hard Hat Area (1993)
9. None Too Soon (1996)
10. The Sixteen Men of Tain (2000, 2003 Special Edition)
11. Flat Tire: Music for a Non-Existent Movie (2001)
12. Then! (2003, 2014 Japanese Edition)
