= Live at Yoshi's (Allan Holdsworth album) =

2018 album by Allan Holdsworth

Live album by Allan Holdsworth
- Released: April 15, 2008
- Recorded: 29 September, 2006
- Venue: Yoshi's, Oakland, California
- Genre: Jazz fusion
- Length: 1:25:19
- Label: Altitude Digital
- Producer: Eric Dorris

Live at Yoshi's is a live concert video by guitarist Allan Holdsworth with keyboardist Alan Pasqua, and featuring the bassist Jimmy Haslip and drummer Chad Wackerman. The DVD was an edited selection of performances from four concerts that took place at Yoshi's, in Oakland, California on the evenings of 29-30 September, 2006 and was released by Altitude Digital in 2008.

A double live CD entitled Blues for Tony featuring the same lineup from the same tour was recorded in Europe in May of 2007 and released in 2009.

== Track listing ==
| No. | Title | Writer(s) | Length |
|---|---|---|---|
| 1. | "The Fifth" | Chad Wackerman | 8:25 |
| 2. | "Looking Glass" | Allan Holdsworth | 7:50 |
| 3. | "Fred" | Allan Holdsworth | 8:45 |
| 4. | "It Must Be Jazz" | Alan Pasqua, Allan Holdsworth, Chad Wackerman, Jimmy Haslip | 9:42 |
| 5. | "Blues for Tony" | Alan Pasqua | 8:47 |
| 6. | "San Michele" | Alan Pasqua | 13:30 |
| 7. | "Pud Wud" | Allan Holdsworth | 13:07 |
| 8. | "Protocosmos" | Alan Pasqua | 5:22 |
| 9. | "Red Alert" | Tony Newton | 9:46 |
| Total length: | | | 1:25:19 |

== Personnel ==
- Allan Holdsworth – guitar
- Alan Pasqua – keyboards
- Chad Wackerman – drums
- Jimmy Haslip – bass

Technical

- Eric Dorris - director
