= None Too Soon =

Studio album by Allan Holdsworth
- Released: 16 September 1996
- Recorded: October 1994
- Studios: The Brewery, North County, San Diego
- Genres: Jazz fusion, jazz, bebop
- Length: 51:01
- Label: Polydor
- Producer: Allan Holdsworth

Allan Holdsworth chronology
| Hard Hat Area (1993) | None Too Soon (1996) | Heavy Machinery (1996) |

None Too Soon is the ninth studio album by guitarist Allan Holdsworth, released in September 1996 by Polydor Records (Japan), JMS–Cream Records (Europe) and Restless Records (United States); a remastered edition was reissued on 17 April 2012 through MoonJune Records.

In a slight departure from Holdsworth's usual solo work, the album is composed mainly of jazz standard interpretations, as well as two original pieces written by pianist and longtime collaborator Gordon Beck. Both musicians had previously worked together on the albums Sunbird (1979), The Things You See (1980) and With a Heart in My Song (1988). The rhythm section are bassist Gary Willis and drummer Kirk Covington, both of fusion band Tribal Tech.

== Overview ==
In a 1996 interview, Holdsworth explained the reasoning for not including any original material written by himself: "Gordon Beck once suggested that I should do an album with more well known tunes so people can hear what I sound like over these tunes. ... The other good reason for this choice is that I haven't written enough original material to fill an album." On the selection of songs, Holdsworth stated: "We absolutely didn't want to play all the classic standards everybody is playing already ... I definitely didn't want to do any of my own tunes this time." On the type of jazz being played: "It's not a trad album. It's a bebop album, but with a wrench or two in there." According to Holdsworth, Beck's use of a digital piano (as opposed to a regular one) was something to which the latter was not accustomed.

The album was recorded in October 1994, but was not released worldwide until almost two years later due to problems between Holdsworth and Polydor: "I had a lot of problems with the record company. I was signed to a certain company for a world deal. ... Then they informed me that they weren't going to release it anywhere else in the world just because one guy didn't like the music!"

== Critical reception ==
Professional ratings
Review scores
| Source | Rating |
|---|---|
| All About Jazz | Neutral |
| All About Jazz (2) | Neutral |
| AllMusic | 2.5/5 stars |

None Too Soon has received mixed reviews. Chris M. Slawecki at All About Jazz likened Holdsworth's playing and interpretations to the Mahavishnu Orchestra, Pat Metheny and John Scofield, whilst praising Beck's work on the title track as "well-considered and articulate in design and execution". John Kelman, also at All About Jazz, remarked that the album had "a kind of restrained power that makes this not exactly a fusion record, but not exactly a straight-ahead one either".

Michael G. Nastos at AllMusic praised Holdsworth's unique style, but suggested a need for him to show restraint during his usual passages and try different sounds.

== Track listing ==
| No. | Title | Music | Length |
|---|---|---|---|
| 1. | "Countdown" | John Coltrane | 3:11 |
| 2. | "Nuages" | Django Reinhardt | 5:41 |
| 3. | "How Deep Is the Ocean" | Irving Berlin | 5:29 |
| 4. | "Isotope" | Joe Henderson | 5:41 |
| 5. | "None Too Soon Pt I/Interlude/None Too Soon Pt II" | Gordon Beck | 7:44 |
| 6. | "Norwegian Wood" | John Lennon, Paul McCartney | 5:55 |
| 7. | "Very Early" | Bill Evans | 7:42 |
| 8. | "San Marcos" | Beck | 3:24 |
| 9. | "Inner Urge" | Henderson | 6:14 |
| Total length: | | | 51:01 |

== Personnel ==
- Allan Holdsworth – guitar, SynthAxe, engineering, mixing, production
- Gordon Beck – digital piano
- Kirk Covington – drums
- Gary Willis – bass

Technical

- Bernie Grundman – mastering
- Chris Bellman – remastering (reissue)
- Leonardo Pavkovic – executive production (reissue)
