= Sunbird (album) =

Studio album by Gordon Beck
- Released: 1979
- Genre: Jazz
- Length: 36:28
- Label: JMS–Cream
- Producer: Jean-Marie Salhani

Gordon Beck chronology
| The French Connection (1978) | Sunbird (1979) | The Things You See (1980) |

Sunbird is a studio album by pianist Gordon Beck, released in 1979 through JMS–Cream Records. This was the second Beck recording to feature guitarist Allan Holdsworth, following up Conversation Piece (1977). Two additional collaborative albums would follow: The Things You See (1980) and With a Heart in My Song (1988). Both Sunbird and The Things You See were reissued together as a compilation in 1989 (with the omission of "Flight" from Sunbird) and again in 1994 (including "Flight"). Sunbird by itself was reissued on 17 September 1996.

== Critical reception ==
Professional ratings
Review scores
| Source | Rating |
|---|---|
| AllMusic | 3/5 stars |

Scott Yanow at AllMusic gave Sunbird three stars out of five, noting that "the overall music is not as memorable as one would hope". However, despite saying that it was not a classic, he nonetheless deemed it of interest to Holdsworth fans curious to hear him in a different context than usual.

== Track listing ==
| No. | Title | Length |
|---|---|---|
| 1. | "The Gathering" | 2:45 |
| 2. | "Flight": "Part 1"; "Part 2"; "Part 3"; "Part 4"" | 15:29: 6:43; 3:00; 2:49; 3:14 |
| 3. | "Halfway House" | 6:21 |
| 4. | "Sunbird" | 5:03 |
| 5. | "Second Summer" | 6:49 |
| Total length: | | 36:32 |

== Personnel ==
- Allan Holdsworth – guitar, electric violin
- Gordon Beck – Rhodes piano, piano
- Aldo Romano – drums, percussion
- Jean-François Jenny-Clark – bass
- Jean-Marie Salhani – production
