= 'Igginbottom =

English progressive rock band

'Igginbottom was an English progressive rock band, formed in Bradford West Riding of Yorkshire in 1968, featuring Steven Robinson (guitar), Allan Holdsworth (guitar, vocals), Dave Freeman (drums) and Mick Skelly (bass). They were managed by a company called Mimo, which was owned by Mick Jackson (also of Bradford), Mo Bacon, Morgan Fisher (all members of the band Love Affair at the time), Ronnie Scott and his business partner Pete King. Their only album, 'Igginbottom's Wrench, was released in 1969 on the Deram label.

== History ==
The band's name was come up with spontaneously when Michael Jackson of The Love Affair visited Yorkshire, where he met his old friends Steve Robinson and Allan Holdsworth, who had formed a nameless band playing a strange sounding combination of rock and jazz. The company also consisted of Mick Skelly and Dave Freeman. Jackson saw something in the band and persuaded his friends Morgan Fisher and Maurice Bacon (both also from The Love Affair) to produce an LP for the quartet. The band had already performed at this point, including at the famous Ronnie Scott's Club. Scott was so impressed that he also wanted to write a foreword/introduction to the album. Another link between Scott and 'Igginbottom is that he formed the management Mimo with Jackson, Bacon and Peter King, which the band joined.

The band only released one album: 'Igginbottom's wrench. Holdsworth later distanced himself from the album but was unable to prevent the album from also being released under the group name Allan Holdsworth & Friends.

After recording that album, Allan Holdworth would play in numerous other bands and occasional formations (including Soft Machine and UK), but he also released a whole series of solo albums, starting with Velvet Darkness and I.O.U., on which Stevenson's song Out from Under appeared. Freeman continued playing drums at First Aid with the album Nostradamus.
