= Glenmorangie distillery =

Whisky distillery in Tain, Scotland

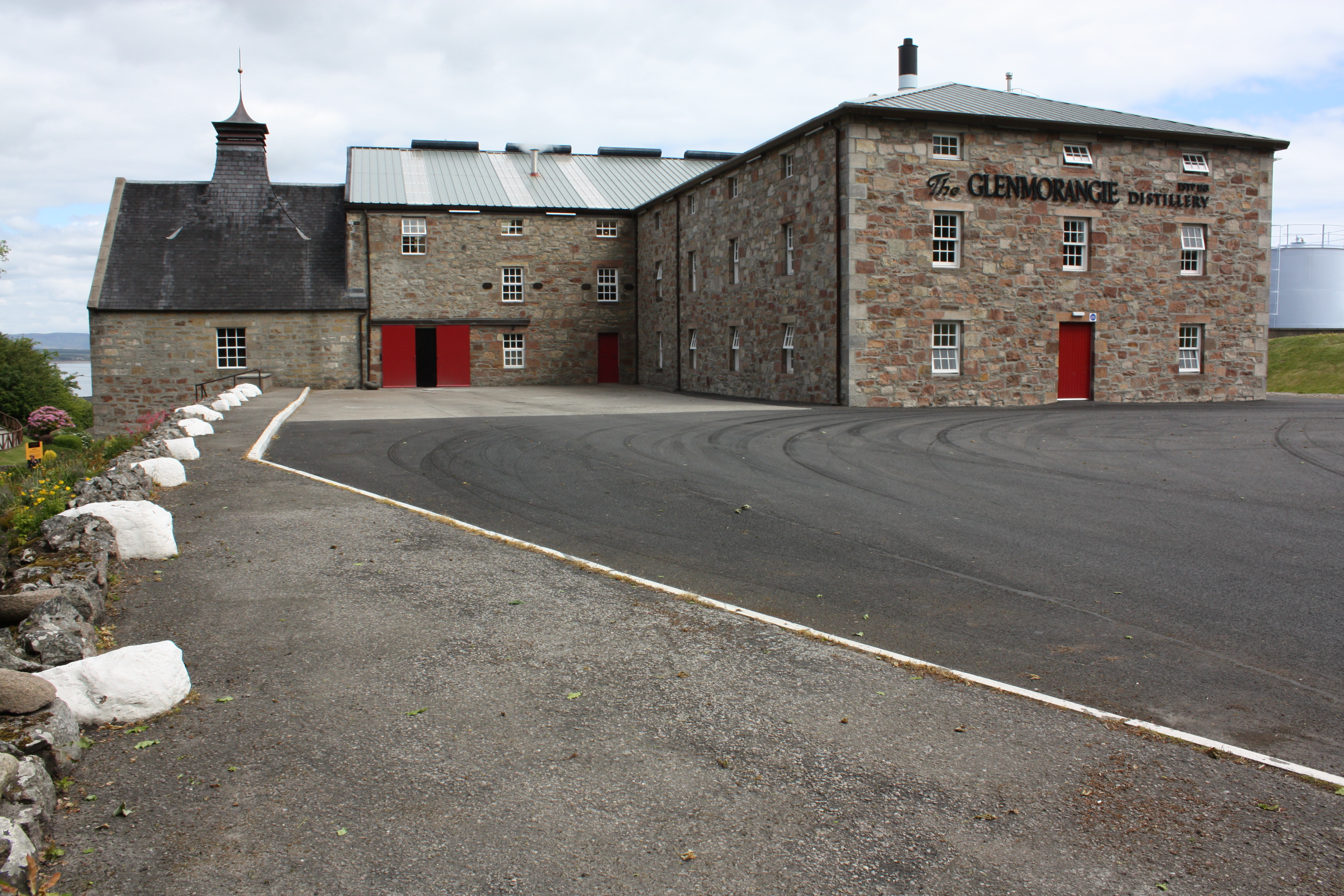

Region: Highland
- Location: Tain
- Coordinates: 57°49′33.2″N 4°4′40.8″W
- Owner: Louis Vuitton Moët Hennessy
- Founded: 1843
- Status: Operational
- Water source: Tarlogie Springs in the Tarlogie Hills
- No. of stills: 6 wash stills 6 spirit stills
- Capacity: 6.5 million litres per annum

Glenmorangie
- Type: Single malt
- Age(s): Original (10 Years) "Extra Matured" Range (~12 Years); 18 Years; 25 Years
- Cask type(s): American white oak, ex-bourbon whiskey casks (main); Oloroso sherry casks Ruby port casks Sauternes wine casks "Artisan" air-dried white oak casks
- ABV: 40–46%

Glenmorangie logo, based on the lower panel on the Hilton of Cadboll Stone

Glenmorangie distillery (pronounced with the stress on the second syllable:; the toponym is believed to derive from either Gaelic Gleann Mòr na Sìth "vale of tranquillity" or Gleann Mór-innse "vale of big meadows") is a distillery in Tain, Ross-shire, Scotland, that produces single malt Scotch whisky.

The distillery is owned by The Glenmorangie Company Ltd (a subsidiary of Louis Vuitton Moët Hennessy), whose main product is the range of Glenmorangie single malt whisky. Glenmorangie is categorised as a Highland distillery and boasts the tallest stills in Scotland. It is available in Original (12-year old), 18-, and 25-year-old bottlings, special cask bottlings, cask finishes, extra matured bottlings, and a range of special edition bottlings.

== History ==
Legends tell that alcoholic beverages of one kind or another were produced in and around Tain since the Middle Ages.

According to the Glenmorangie Company, the earliest record of the production of alcohol at Morangie Farm is dated 1703. In the 1730s a brewery was built on the site that shared the farm's water source, the Tarlogie Spring. A former distillery manager at Balblair, William Matheson, acquired the farm in 1843 and converted the Morangie brewery to a distillery, equipped with two-second hand gin stills. He later renamed the distillery Glenmorangie.

The distillery was purchased by its main customer, the Leith firm Macdonald and Muir, in 1918. The Macdonald family would retain control of the company for almost 90 years.

Glenmorangie, like all distilleries and breweries in Britain, suffered terribly between 1920 and 1950, with Prohibition and then the Great Depression in the United States reducing whisky sales. The distillery was effectively mothballed between 1931 and 1936. The depression ended with World War II, but the war effort left fuel and barley in short supply and the distillery was again mothballed between 1941 and 1944. Exports of whisky were important during the war, but enemy action disrupted and destroyed deliveries to the United States and Canada.

Towards the end of the war and in the immediate post-war period, the distillery increased production and was running at full capacity by 1948. The number of stills was increased from two to four during 1977. Water supply became a concern during the 1980s when development of the land around the Tarlogie Springs seemed likely. Development could have reduced the quality and quantity of water available to the distillery, so the decision was made to purchase around 600 acres (2.4 km^{2}) of land around and including the Tarlogie Springs. The distillery once again engaged in expansion during 1990 when it added a further four stills, and two additional fermentation vessels (or washbacks) were added during 2002. Four new stills were added in 2009, bringing the total to twelve.

The Macdonald family retained ownership of 52% of the company through a complicated London Stock Exchange listing which saw the family hold the majority of the voting shares in the company. In 2004, the company was sold to the French drinks company Moët Hennessy Louis Vuitton for around £300 million.

Following the change of ownership, the Glenmorangie product line was rebranded to increase its appeal in the overseas luxury goods market. A new, more curvaceous, bottle was introduced and the Wood Finish whiskies were given new names such as The Quinta Ruban, Nectar d'Or and LaSanta. According to Professor Paul Freathy, the director of the Institute of Retail Studies at the University of Stirling, "The French-sounding names are an unusual innovation, because what makes whisky unique is the traditional tie to Scotland. It's a brave strategy."

For some years, The Glenmorangie Company supplied its whisky for the production of "own brand" blended whisky by supermarket groups. The practice ceased in 2009 when it sold off the Glen Moray brand.

Glenmorangie has been the best selling single malt in Scotland almost continuously since 1983, and produces around 10 million bottles per annum, of which 6 to 6.5 million are sold in the UK. Globally, Glenmorangie has a 6% share of the single malt market.

== Production ==
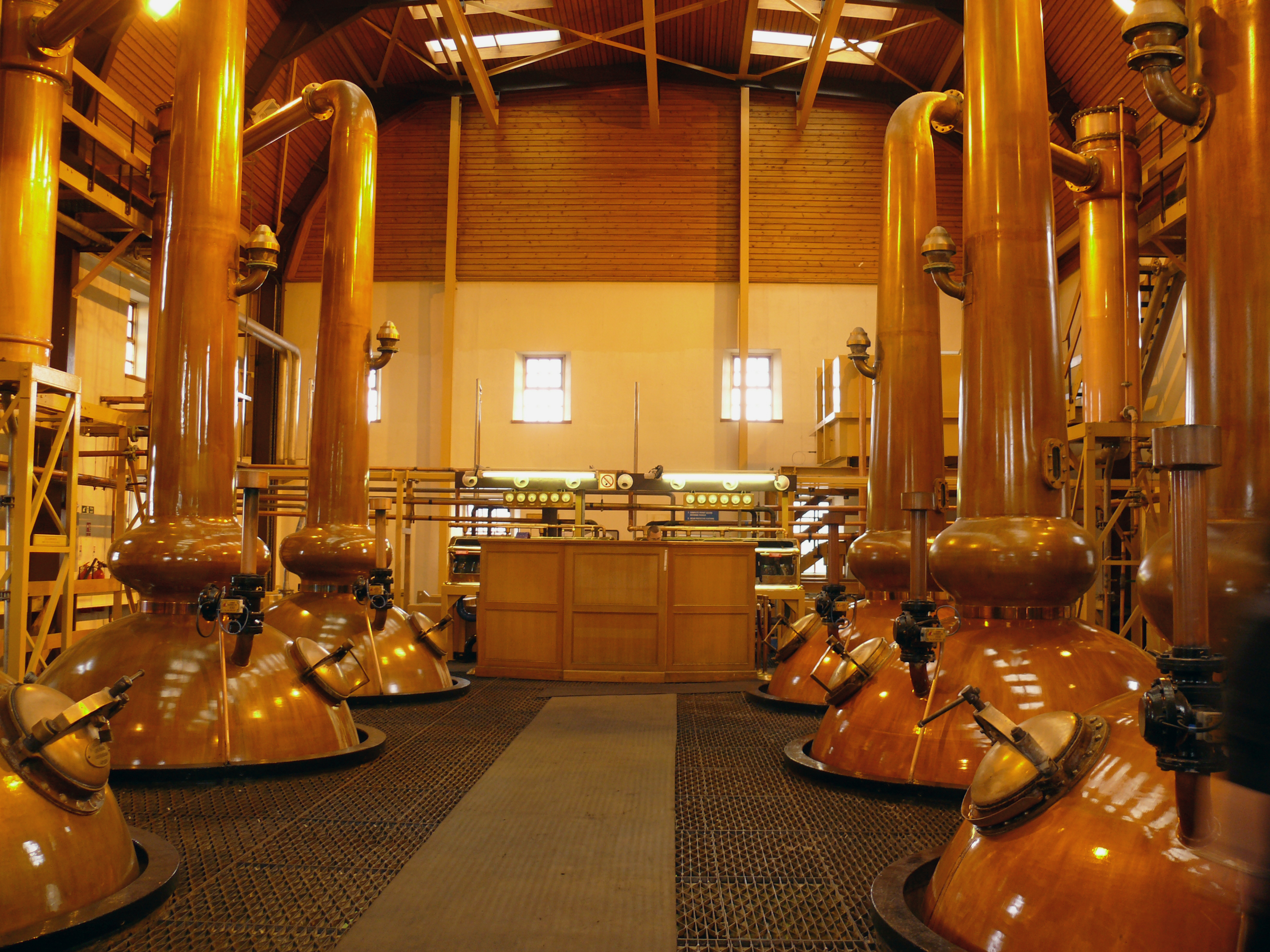
The stills which stand 26 ft (7.9 m) high

Glenmorangie's water source is the Tarlogie Springs, situated in the Tarlogie Hills above the distillery. Barley grain is supplied by Highland Grain Ltd, a co-operative of farmers in the area. The stills used, the tallest in Scotland at 26 ft 3 in (8.00 m) tall, with 16-foot-10.25-inch (5.1372 m) necks, are claimed by the company to produce an extremely light taste. The distillation process was for decades undertaken by a staff of 16, known as The Sixteen Men of Tain, who worked year round, with the exceptions of Christmas and periods of maintenance. Expansion of production since 2008 has led to a larger staff of 24, who are now referred to on bottles and in promotional leaflets just as The Men of Tain.

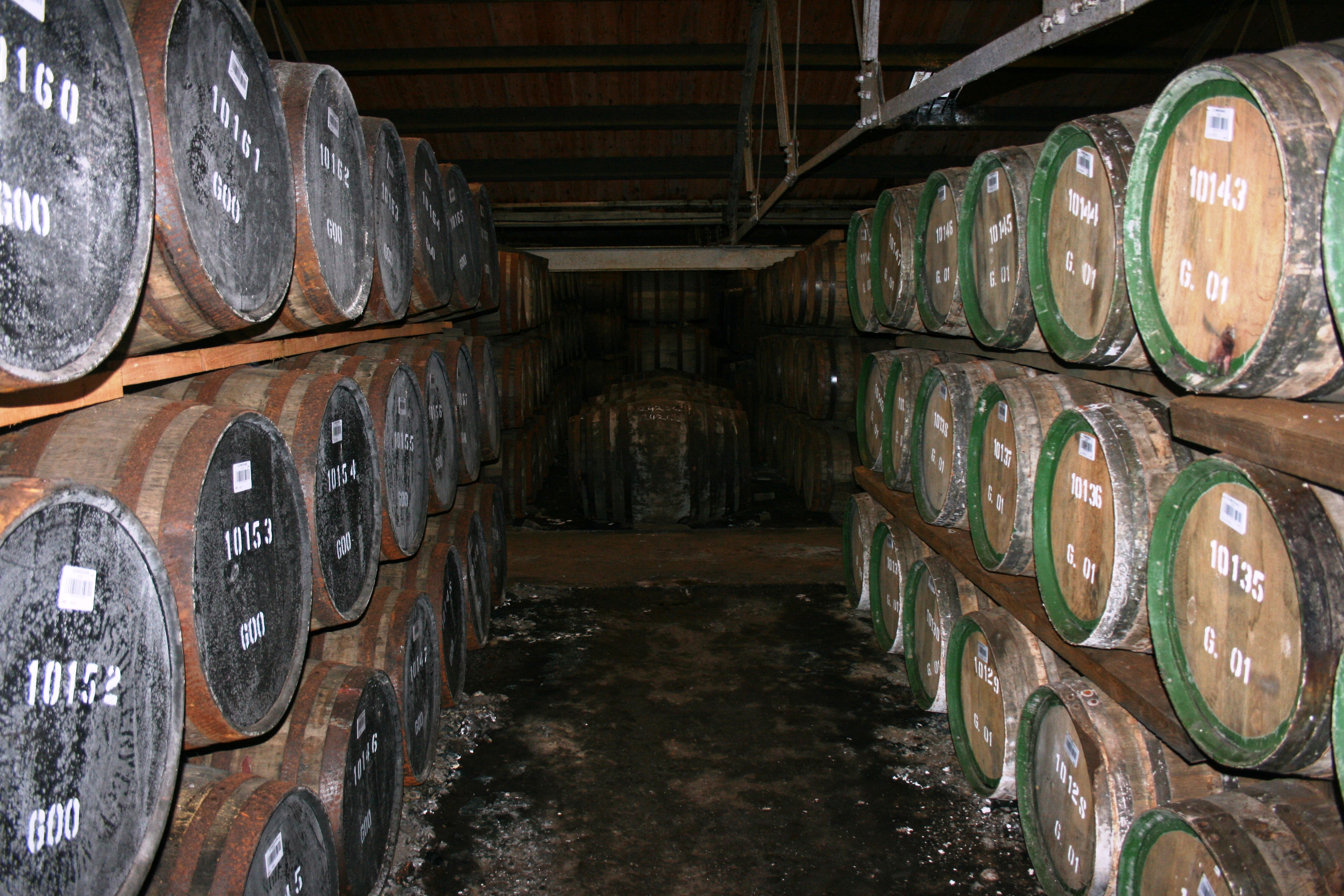
Casks maturing at The Glenmorangie Distillery

Glenmorangie uses a number of different cask types, with all products being matured in white oak casks which are manufactured from trees growing in Glenmorangie's own forest in the Ozark Mountains of Missouri, United States. These new casks are left to air for two years before being leased to distillers Jack Daniel's and Heaven Hill for them to mature bourbon in for four years. Glenmorangie then uses the barrels to mature their spirit. The Original range will mature entirely in ex-bourbon casks, while the Extra Matured range of bottlings are transferred into casks that were previously used to mature other products such as wine, port or sherry in a process called finishing. These form part of the regular range of products Glenmorangie makes. Glenmorangie also obtains small batches of other casks for finishing and release limited edition bottlings from these. Following acquisition by LVMH, Glenmorangie produced a rare limited edition aged in casks previously used to mature Château Margaux; these bottlings are now (2011) extremely hard to find and are priced accordingly.

The warehouses in which the casks are stored are also believed to affect the taste of the whisky. Glenmorangie have released a special edition bottling titled Cellar 13, which is from the warehouse closest to the sea, as the whisky is believed to have a distinctive flavour.

Dr Bill Lumsden MBE has been with Glenmorangie for more than 25 years and oversees all whisky production. He is the Director of Distilling, Whisky Creation and Whisky Stocks.

Bottling of the Glenmorangie and Ardbeg brands takes place at The Glenmorangie Company's purpose-built bottling plant in The Alba Campus at Livingston, West Lothian, just outside Edinburgh, Scotland. Glenmorangie previously bottled Drambuie in a joint venture with the Drambuie Company; this arrangement ended in 2010.

== Pronunciation ==
Glen-MOR-angie: the name of the whisky is /ɡlɛnˈmɒrəndʒi/ glen-MORR-ən-jee, with the stress on the "mor" and rhyming with orangey (not */ˌɡlɛnmɔˈrændʒi/ GLEN-mor-AN-jee as it is commonly mispronounced).

== Bottlings ==
Core Range: Original, Lasanta, Quinta Ruban, and Nectar 16 years old (formerly Nectar D'Or 12 years old).

Prestige Range: 18, 19, 25, Signet, Pride 1981, Pride 1978, Pride 1974, and Grand Vintage Malt 1990.

Private Edition Range: (1st Annual Release) Sonnalta PX; 2010, (2) Finealta; 2011, (3) Artein; 2012, (4) Ealanta; 2013, (5) Companta; 2014, (6) Tùsail; 2015, (7) Milsean; 2016, (8) Bacalta; 2017, (9) Spios; 2018, and (10) Allta; 2019.

Legend Collection: Tarlogan, Tayne, Duthac, Dornoc, and Cadboll.

Limited Edition Range: Astar; 2009 and 2017, A Midwinter Night's Dram; 2015 and 2017, Malaga Cask Finish; 2020 Cadboll Estate; 2020, A Tale Of Cake; 2020, A Tale Of Winter; 2021, A Tale of the Forest; 2022, Dr. Bill Lumsden x Azuma Makoto; 2024.

Cask Masters Selections: Taghta 2014 (Sherry Cask).

"Tale of" Series: A Tale of Cake 2020, A Tale of Winter 2021, A Tale of The Forest 2022, A Tale of Tokyo 2023.

"Barrel Select Release" Series: Malaga Finish (2020), Cognac Finish (2021), Amontillado Finish (2023), Palo Cortado Finish (2023), Calvados Finish (2024)

== Accolades ==
Glenmorangie's products have tended to garner very high scores from international Spirit ratings competitions and from liquor reviewing bodies. Its 12-year Lasanta and 18-year single malt spirits, for example, have never received less than a silver medal at the San Francisco World Spirits Competitions. The 12-year Lasanta has been placed in the Top 10 percentile of all whiskies by Proof66.com, which aggregates liquor ratings from the San Francisco World Spirits Competition, Wine Enthusiast, and others. Over the last five years Glenmorangie has won more "Gold Best in Class" awards than any other single malt Scotch whisky from the International Wine and Spirits Competition. In 2012, the IWSC awarded The Glenmorangie Company the title Distiller of the Year.

Glenmorangie Quarter Century won Best Highland Single Malt at the 2013 World Whisky Awards.

== In popular culture ==
Jazz fusion guitarist Allan Holdsworth released an album named The Sixteen Men of Tain in 2000.

In the 1986 film Highlander, Conner MacLeod, played by Christopher Lambert, orders a "double Glenmorangie on the rocks."

== See also ==
- List of distilleries in Scotland
