= Live in Japan 1984 =

2018 album by Allan Holdsworth

Live album by Allan Holdsworth
- Released: December 7, 2018
- Recorded: 14 May 1984
- Venue: Yubin Chokin Hall, Tokyo
- Genre: Jazz fusion
- Length: 75:10
- Label: Manifesto Records
- Producer: Dan Perloff

Allan Holdsworth chronology
The Man Who Changed Guitar Forever! The Allan Holdsworth Album Collection (2017)	Live in Japan 1984 (2018)	Warsaw Summer Jazz Days '98 (2019)

Live in Japan 1984 is a live album by guitarist Allan Holdsworth that was released by Manifesto Records in 2018.

The first thousand copies of this CD were released with a DVD of the performance filmed for Japanese television, which also includes clips of an interview with Holdsworth. This was originally released as Allan Holdsworth in Japan – Tokyo Dream on LaserDisc in 1984 by Toei Video.

== Reception ==
Professional ratings
Review scores
Source	Rating
All About Jazz	4.5/5 stars
Jazzwise	3/5 stars
Music Connection	9/10 stars

All About Jazz awarded the album with 4.5 out of 5 stars. The review by John Kelman states: "With wonderfully remastered audio and, for those first thousand, a revelatory video as well, the official release of Live in Japan 1984 may well be long overdue".

Andy Robson of Jazzwise wrote: "All the swells, sighs and tapping are there, and those cascading chromatic runs starburst everywhere, but as Holdsworth's bent was soon to change, they're all the more appreciated."

Music Connection's Eric Harabadian commented: "This is an historic document, not only because it was the last live set by I.O.U. but, because it was broadcast on Japanese TV, the production value and sound quality are excellent."

== Track listing ==
All tracks are written by Allan Holdsworth, except where noted.

No.	Title	Writer(s)	Length
1.	"Tokyo Dream"		6:58
2.	"Road Games"	lyrics by Paul Williams	4:25
3.	"White Line"	lyrics by Pete Brown	7:01
4.	"Panic Station"	lyrics by Williams	4:10
5.	"Letters of Marque"		6:42
6.	"Home"		5:42
7.	"Devil Take the Hindmost"		5:26
8.	"Material Real"		7:42
9.	"Metal Fatigue"	lyrics by Williams	5:03
10.	"Where Is One?"		7:59
11.	"The Things You See (When You Haven't Got Your Gun)"		7:27
12.	"Was There?"	lyrics by Williams	6:30
Total length:			75:10

== Personnel ==
- Allan Holdsworth – guitar
- Paul Williams – vocals
- Chad Wackerman – drums
- Jimmy Johnson – bass

Technical

- Gordon "Gordy" Davis – engineer
- Bill Inglot, Dave Schultz – remastering
