= Heavy machinery (disambiguation) =

Heavy machinery may refer to:

- Heavy equipment
- Heavy industry
- Heavy Machinery (album), an album by Anders Johansson, Jens Johansson and Allan Holdsworth
- Heavy Machinery, a former professional wrestling tag team of Otis and Tucker
