= Paul Williams (English singer) =

English singer and musician (1940–2019)

- Born: Paul Nigel Vincent Yarlett; 19 September 1940; Surbiton, Surrey
- Origin: England
- Died: 1 March 2019 (aged 78)
- Genres: Rock, blues, R&B, jazz rock
- Occupations: Singer, musician
- Instruments: Vocals, bass, keyboards, percussion, harmonica
- Years active: 1963–2018
- Website: paulwilliams-uk.com

Paul Williams (born Paul Nigel Vincent Yarlett; 19 September 1940 – 1 March 2019) was an English blues and rock singer and musician.

== Career ==
During his early career he joined Zoot Money's Big Roll Band on bass and vocals, alongside the guitarist Andy Summers. He then replaced John McVie in John Mayall & the Bluesbreakers, while also recording with Aynsley Dunbar and Dick Heckstall-Smith. In 1970 he joined the band Juicy Lucy as lead vocalist and recorded the album Lie Back and Enjoy It. This band included future Whitesnake guitarist Micky Moody and featured in the 1971 film Bread. Williams later collaborated with Moody on the album Smokestacks, Broomdusters and Hoochie Coochie Men in 2002.

In 1973 he joined the progressive rock group Tempest, led by Jon Hiseman on drums with Mark Clarke on bass and Allan Holdsworth on guitar. After relocating to the United States, he joined Holdsworth in the group known as I.O.U. and recorded the three critically acclaimed albums I.O.U., Road Games and Metal Fatigue.

His most recent touring band had been Blue Thunder, with release in collaboration with David Hentschel in 2018 of Blue Thunder 2.

== Discography ==
=== As leader/co-leader ===
- Delta Blues Singer (1973)
- In Memory of Robert Johnson (1973)
- Blues and Beyond with Blue Thunder (1998)
- Smokestacks, Broomdusters and Hoochie Coochie Men (2002) with Micky Moody

=== With other artists ===
With Zoot Money

- The All Happening Zoot Money's Big Roll Band at Klooks Kleek (1966)

With John Mayall

- Looking Back (1969)
- Thru the Years (1971)
- London Blues (1964–1969) (1992)

With Aynsley Dunbar

- Blue Whale (1971)

With Juicy Lucy

- Lie Back and Enjoy It (1970)
- Get a Whiff of This (1971)
- Pieces (1972)

With Dick Heckstall-Smith

- A Story Ended (1972)
- Blues and Beyond (2001)

With Tempest

- Tempest (1973)
- Under the Blossom: The Anthology (2005)

With Allan Holdsworth

- I.O.U. (1982)
- Road Games (1983)
- Metal Fatigue (1985)
- I.O.U. Live (1997, unauthorised)
- Live in Japan 1984 (2018)
