= 'Igginbottom's Wrench =

Studio album by 'Igginbottom
- Released: 1969
- Recorded: West End of London
- Genre: Jazz fusion, progressive rock
- Length: 44:21
- Label: Deram
- Producer: Morgan Fisher, Maurice Bacon, Michael Jackson

Professional ratings
Review scores
Source	Rating
AllMusic	3.5/5 stars

'Igginbottom's Wrench is a studio album by the band 'Igginbottom, released in 1969 through Deram Records originally on vinyl only.

It has been reissued a number of times (sometimes under the group title of "Allan Holdworth & Friends"), most notably on CD for the first time on 5 March 1989, as well as a remastered edition in 2000 through Angel Air Records with extensive liner notes detailing the band's history. It is one of the first recordings to feature guitarist Allan Holdsworth.

== Track listing ==
No.	Title	Writer(s)	Length
1.	"The Castle"	Allan Holdsworth	2:56
2.	"Out of Confusion"	Dave Freeman, Steven Robinson, Holdsworth, Mick Skelly	2:08
3.	"The Witch"	Holdsworth	3:04
4.	"Sweet Dry Biscuits"	Holdsworth	2:54
5.	"California Dreamin'"	John Phillips	4:01
6.	"Golden Lakes"	Holdsworth	5:13
7.	"Not So Sweet Dreams"	Holdsworth	5:00
8.	"Is She Just a Dream?"	Holdsworth, Skelly	4:34
9.	"Blind Girl"	Robinson	3:48
10.	"The Donkey"	Robinson	10:43
Total length:			44:21

== Personnel ==
'Igginbottom

- Allan Holdsworth – vocals, guitar
- Steven Robinson – vocals, guitar
- Dave Freeman – drums
- Mick Skelly – bass

Technical

- Nick Watson – remastering (reissue)
- Morgan Fisher – production
- Maurice Bacon – production
- Michael Jackson – production
