= I.O.U. (album) =

Studio album by Allan Holdsworth
- Released: 1982
- Recorded: 1979
- Studio: The Barge, London canals
- Genre: Jazz fusion
- Length: 39:49
- Label: Luna Crack/I.O.U.
- Producer: Allan Holdsworth

Allan Holdsworth chronology
The Things You See (1980)	I.O.U. (1982)	Road Games (1983)

Alternative cover
- 1985 reissue

I.O.U. is the second studio album by guitarist Allan Holdsworth, released in 1982 through Luna Crack Records/I.O.U. Records originally on vinyl; a CD edition was reissued in 1985 through Enigma Records, and a remaster in 2008 through Belle Antique. Holdsworth’s band consists of drummer and pianist Gary Husband, bassist Paul Carmichael and singer Paul Williams, with whom Holdsworth had worked in Tempest. A previous solo album, Velvet Darkness, was released in 1976 without Holdsworth's consent, therefore making this (in his view) his first official solo release. Many tracks from Velvet Darkness were refined, re-recorded and retitled for I.O.U., whilst "The Things You see" takes its name from an earlier album of the same name, made in collaboration with keyboardist Gordon Beck.

== Critical reception ==
Professional ratings
Review scores
Source	Rating
AllMusic	4.5/5 stars

John W. Patterson at AllMusic described I.O.U. as "high-quality jazz fusion interplay" and praised Holdsworth's "well-crafted soloing".

== Track listing ==
All tracks are written by Allan Holdsworth, except where noted.

No.	Title	Length
1.	"The Things You See (When You Haven't Got Your Gun)"	5:52
2.	"Where Is One"	5:38
3.	"Checking Out"	3:39
4.	"Letters of Marque"	7:02
5.	"Out from Under" (Steven Robinson, Holdsworth)	3:34
6.	"Temporary Fault"	3:17
7.	"Shallow Sea"	6:04
8.	"White Line" (Holdsworth, Pete Brown)	4:43
Total length:		39:49

== Personnel ==
- Allan Holdsworth – guitar, violin (6), production
- Paul Williams – vocals
- Gary Husband – drums, piano (6)
- Paul Carmichael – bass

Technical

- Andy Llewellyn – engineering
- Colin Green – mixing
