= Heavy Machinery (album) =

- Swedish and Japanese edition

Studio album by Allan Holdsworth, Jens Johansson and Anders Johansson
- Released: 1996
- Studio: Starec Studios, Växjö; Moon Path, Sweden; The Brewery, North County, San Diego; 71st Street Recording, New York City
- Genre: Jazz fusion, instrumental rock
- Length: 73:59
- Label: Heptagon
- Producer: Jens Johansson, Anders Johansson

Allan Holdsworth chronology
None Too Soon (1996)	Heavy Machinery (1996)	I.O.U. Live (1997)

Jens Johansson chronology
Heavy Machinery (1996)	Sonic Winter (1997)

Alternative cover
- US edition

Heavy Machinery is a collaborative studio album by guitarist Allan Holdsworth, keyboardist Jens Johansson and drummer Anders Johansson, released in 1996 through Heptagon Records (Sweden), and on 12 August 1997 through Shrapnel Records (United States) and Pony Canyon (Japan).

Confusingly, on the album's European/US release, "Macrowaves" is made up of complete silence after 2:51, with an additional improvised "filler" keyboard and drum solo by the Johanssons at 23:46. On the Japanese release, "Macrowaves" only comprises the first part as normal without any silence; the silence has instead been moved to the bonus track, "The Moose Are Marching", where it fills the space from 7:59 to 20:45, after which the latter keyboard solo from "Macrowaves" ends the album.

== Critical reception ==
Professional ratings
Review scores
Source	Rating
AllMusic	3/5 stars

John W. Patterson at AllMusic awarded Heavy Machinery three stars out of five, describing the album as "unforgettable fireworks of furious fusion" and "great jazz-rock fusion". He praised all three musicians for their intense playing, in particular comparing Holdsworth and Jens Johansson's jamming to the duo of guitarist Jeff Beck and keyboardist Jan Hammer, but remarked that the album is "just more intriguing than those Hammer/Beck excursions."

== Track listing ==
All music is composed by Jens Johansson

No.	Title	Length
1.	"Joint Ventures"	5:48
2.	"Beef Cherokee"	4:02
3.	"On the Frozen Lake"	4:52
4.	"Mission: Possible"	5:15
5.	"Good Morning, Mr. Coffee"	7:25
6.	"Siouxp of the Day"	4:02
7.	"On the Fritz"	5:24
8.	"Tea for One and a Half"	6:22
9.	"Never Mind Our Weather"	5:54
10.	"Macrowaves"	24:55
Total length:		73:59

Japanese edition track listing
No.	Title	Length
1.	"Joint Ventures"	5:48
2.	"Beef Cherokee"	4:02
3.	"On the Frozen Lake"	4:52
4.	"Mission: Possible"	5:15
5.	"Good Morning, Mr. Coffee"	7:25
6.	"Siouxp of the Day"	4:02
7.	"On the Fritz"	5:24
8.	"Tea for One and a Half"	6:22
9.	"Never Mind Our Weather"	5:54
10.	"Macrowaves"	2:57
11.	"The Moose Are Marching"	21:57
Total length:		73:58

== Personnel ==
- Allan Holdsworth – guitar, SynthAxe
- Jens Johansson – keyboard, bass synthesizer, engineering, mixing, production
- Anders Johansson – drums, production

Technical

- Nolan Moffitte – engineering
- Yoram Vazan – engineering
- Krister Olsson – mastering
