= Flat Tire: Music for a Non-Existent Movie =

Studio album by Allan Holdsworth
- Released: 1 December 2001
- Recorded: 2000–2001
- Studio: The House, San Juan Capistrano, California
- Genre: Jazz fusion
- Length: 47:30
- Label: Megazoidal
- Producer: Allan Holdsworth

Allan Holdsworth chronology
| The Sixteen Men of Tain (2000) | Flat Tire: Music for a Non-Existent Movie (2001) | All Night Wrong (2002) |

Flat Tire: Music for a Non-Existent Movie is the eleventh and final studio album by guitarist Allan Holdsworth, released on 1 December 2001 through Megazoidal Records and reissued in 2013 through MoonJune Records. Besides the first track, the entire album was recorded by Holdsworth himself using the SynthAxe, an instrument for which he became well known since Atavachron (1986).

In the liner notes, Holdsworth briefly talks about events in his personal life which had resulted in the loss of his home studio, The Brewery, as well as explaining the concept behind the album: "I always liked the idea of trying to create music for movies and through my experiences of the last 18 months The Movie – Flat Tire was made, hence the subtitle Music for a Non-Existent Movie."

== Critical reception ==
Professional ratings
Review scores
| Source | Rating |
|---|---|
| All About Jazz | Favourable |
| All About Jazz (2) | Favourable |
| AllMusic | 3/5 stars |

Flat Tire has received mixed reviews. The staff at All About Jazz gave the album a positive review, calling it a "very uniquely rewarding listening experience" and going into detail about the quirks of the SynthAxe. However, they suggested that diehard fans of Holdsworth's work would appreciate it more than "devoted guitarheads". David R. Adler at AllMusic gave the album three stars out of five, describing the music as "more of a one-man band effect than a solo guitar performance" and "a bit static and repetitive overall". He called the album "not the best introduction" to first-time listeners of Holdsworth, but recommended it for fans of his work.

== Track listing ==
All music is composed by Allan Holdsworth

| No. | Title | Length |
|---|---|---|
| 1. | "The Duplicate Man (Intro)" | 1:52 |
| 2. | "The Duplicate Man" | 4:41 |
| 3. | "Eeny Meeny" | 4:48 |
| 4. | "Please Hold On" | 4:01 |
| 5. | "Snow Moon" | 8:04 |
| 6. | "Curves" | 5:35 |
| 7. | "So Long" | 5:31 |
| 8. | "Bo Peep" | 3:46 |
| 9. | "Don't You Know" | 9:12 |
| Total length: | | 47:30 |

== Personnel ==
- Allan Holdsworth – guitar, SynthAxe, drum programming, production
- Dave Carpenter – bass (tracks 3, 8)
- Chris Bellman – mastering
