= The Things You See =

Studio album by Allan Holdsworth and Gordon Beck
- Released: 1980
- Genre: Jazz
- Length: 39:32
- Label: JMS–Cream
- Producer: Jean-Marie Salhani

Allan Holdsworth chronology
Velvet Darkness (1976)	The Things You See (1980)	I.O.U. (1982)

Gordon Beck chronology
Sunbird (1979)	The Things You See (1980)	The French Connection 2 (1982)

Alternative cover
- Vinyl edition

Alternative cover
- Japanese reissue

The Things You See is a collaborative studio album by guitarist Allan Holdsworth and pianist Gordon Beck, released in 1980 through JMS–Cream Records. Both The Things You See and Beck's 1979 album Sunbird were reissued together as a compilation in 1989 (with the omission of "Flight" from Sunbird) and again in 1994 (including "Flight"). Holdsworth and Beck would later collaborate again on With a Heart in My Song in 1988.

The album's title was explained by Holdsworth on his 1992 instructional video: "The title for this tune came from me kind of... falling out of a pub one night back in England. There was this old guy walking down the street, and I guess he must have seen all of us hooligans coming out of the pub. He just looked at us and said, 'Boy, the things you see when you haven't got your gun!'"

"At the Edge" also features a rare instance of Holdsworth singing; the song would later be revamped and renamed "The Things You See (When You Haven't Got Your Gun)" on his 1982 album I.O.U., with Paul Williams on vocals.

== Critical reception ==
Professional ratings
Review scores
Source	Rating
AllMusic	3/5 stars

Scott Yanow at AllMusic gave The Things You See three stars out of five, noting that "the overall music is not as memorable as one would hope". However, despite saying that it was not a classic, he nonetheless deemed it of interest to Holdsworth fans curious to hear him in a different context than usual.

== Track listing ==
No.	Title	Writer(s)	Length
1.	"Golden Lakes"	Allan Holdsworth	4:48
2.	"Stop Fiddlin'"	Gordon Beck	2:56
3.	"The Things You See (When You Haven't Got Your Gun)"	Holdsworth	4:32
4.	"Diminished Responsability"	Holdsworth	8:17
5.	"She's Lookin', I'm Cookin"	Beck	11:58
6.	"At the Edge"	Holdsworth	3:18
7.	"Up Country"	Beck	3:43
Total length:			39:32

1994 compilation reissue with Sunbird
No.	Title	Writer(s)	Length
1.	"Golden Lakes"	Holdsworth	4:48
2.	"Stop Fiddling"	Beck	2:56
3.	"The Things You See (When You Haven't Got Your Gun)"	Holdsworth	4:32
4.	"Diminished Responsability"	Holdsworth	8:17
5.	"She's Lookin', I'm Cookin"	Beck	11:58
6.	"At the Edge"	Holdsworth	3:18
7.	"Up Country"	Beck	3:43
8.	"The Gathering"	Beck	2:45
9.	"Halfway House"	Beck	6:21
10.	"Sunbird"	Beck	5:03
11.	"Second Summer"	Beck	6:49
12.	"Flight""	Beck: "Part 1"; "Part 2"; "Part 3"; "Part 4"	15:29: 6:43; 3:00; 2:49; 3:14
Total length:			76:05

== Personnel ==
- Allan Holdsworth – vocals, guitar, electric violin
- Gordon Beck – Rhodes piano, piano
- Jean-Francois Jenny-Clark - bass (Only on "Sunbird")
- Aldo Romano - Drums & Percussion (Only on "Sunbird")
- Jean-Marie Salhani – production
