= Jimmy Johnson (bassist) =

American bass guitarist (born 1956)

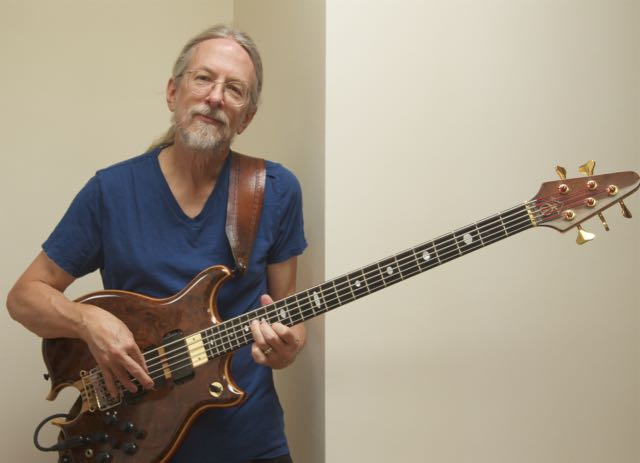

Background information
- Born: 1956 (age 69–70); Minneapolis
- Genres: Jazz, jazz fusion, rock, folk rock
- Occupation: Musician
- Instrument: Bass guitar

Jimmy Johnson (born 1956) is an American bass guitarist best known for his work with James Taylor, Allan Holdsworth, and Flim & the BB's. Raised in a rich musical environment, his father was a 47-year member of the Minnesota Orchestra's bass section, his mother a piano teacher and accompanist, and his brother Gordon is also a professional bassist.

In 1976, Johnson worked with Alembic and GHS to create one of the first 5-string bass guitars with a low B string. Living in the Los Angeles area since 1979, Johnson continues to record and tour with singer-songwriter James Taylor and also appears with various groups at The Baked Potato jazz club in Studio City, California.

== Selected discography ==
- 3rd Matinee – Meanwhile (1994)
- Chris Botti – Night Sessions (2001 – six tracks)
- Paul Brady – Trick or Treat (1992 – two tracks)
- Phil Buckle – Custom Made (2022)
- Dewa Budjana – Joged Kahyangan (2012), Surya Namaskar (2014)
- Dori Caymmi – Dori Caymmi (1988), Brazilian Serenata (1991)
- Billy Childs – Take For Example This (1988), Twilight Is Upon Us (1989), His April Touch (1991 – three tracks), I've Known Rivers (1994), Lyric (2005)
- Luis Conte – La Cocina Caliente (1988), Black Forest (1989), Marimbula (2007), Two Worlds (2010)
- Eddie Daniels – ...this is now (1991 – two tracks)
- DNA – Rick Derringer and Carmine Appice – Party Tested (1983)
- Flim & the BB's – Flim & The BB's (1978), Tricycle (1983), Tunnel (1984), Big Notes (1985), Neon (1987), The Further Adventures... (1988), New Pants (1990), Vintage/best of (2010), This Is A Recording (1992), Tricycle (SACD reissue) (1999)
- Fra Lippo Lippi - Light and Shade (1987 - three tracks)
- Brandon Fields – The Traveler (1988), Other Places (1989)
- The Steve Gadd Band – Gadditude (2013), 70 Strong (2015), Way Back Home: Live from Rochester, NY (2016), Steve Gadd Band (2018)
- Stan Getz – Apasionado (1990)
- Don Grusin – Raven (1990)
- Allen Hinds – Fact Of The Matter (2005), Falling Up (2008), Monkeys and Slides (2011), Fly South (2016)
- Roger Hodgson – In the Eye of the Storm (1984 – two tracks)
- Allan Holdsworth – I.O.U. Live (1984), Metal Fatigue (1985), Atavachron (1986), Sand (1987), Secrets (1989), Wardenclyffe Tower (1992), All Night Wrong (2002), Then! (2004), Against The Clock (2005), Tales From The Vault (2016 – one track only), Live in Japan 1984 (2018)
- Steve Hunt - Connections (2021 - two tracks)
- Steve Hunt & Tim Miller - Changes (2024 - four tracks)
- Gary Husband – Dirty & Beautiful, Vol. 1 (2010), Dirty & Beautiful, Volume 2 (2011)
- Gary Husband and Alf Terje Hana – the Trackers - Vaudeville 8:45 (2022 – two tracks)
- Elton John – The Road To El Dorado (2000 – three tracks)
- Wayne Johnson – Arrowhead (1980), Grasshopper (1983), Everybody's Painting Pictures (1984), Spirit of the Dancer (1988)
- Karizma – Cuba (1986), Arms of Love (1989), Perfect Harmony (2012 – 10 tracks)
- Oz Noy – Fuzzy (2007)
- Earl Klugh – Whispers and Promises (1989 – two tracks)
- Michael Landau – Tales From The Bulge (1990), Live 2000 (2000), Live (2006), Liquid Quartet Live (2020)
- Gloria Trevi – Me Siento Tan Sola (1992)
- Albert Lee – Gagged But Not Bound (1987)
- Kenny Loggins – December (1998)
- Lyle Mays – Eberhard (2021)
- Sérgio Mendes – Confetti (1984 – two tracks), Arara (1989), Brasileiro (1992 – two tracks), Oceano (1996)
- Vince Mendoza – Nights on Earth (2011)
- Dominic Miller – 5th House (2010)
- Nahuel Pennisi – Feliz (2017)
- Simon Phillips – Symbiosis (1995)
- Michael Pinder– The Promise (Mike Pinder album)
- Planet X – Moonbabies (2002), Quantum (2007)
- Michel Polnareff – Enfin! (2018)
- Emily Remler – This Is Me (1990 - two tracks)
- The Rippingtons – Moonlighting (1986), Kilimanjaro (1988), 20th Anniversary (2006)
- Lee Ritenour – Harlequin (1985), Earth Run (1986), Color Rit (1989), Collection (1991)
- Draco Rosa – Frío (1994), Songbirds and Roosters (1998)
- John Serry – Exhibition (1979 – two tracks), Jazziz (1980)
- Vonda Shepard – The Radical Light (1992)
- Derek Sherinian – Inertia (2001), Oceana (2011), The Phoenix (2020 - three tracks)
- Susie Suh – Susie Suh (2005)
- James Taylor – New Moon Shine (1991), Live (1993), Hourglass (1997), October Road (2002), James Taylor at Christmas (2004, 2006 – three tracks), Covers (2008), Other Covers (EP) (2009), Before This World (2015), American Standard (2020 - one track)
- Steve Tavaglione – Blue Tav (1990 – three tracks)
- Sadao Watanabe – Maisha (1985)
- Ernie Watts – Musician (1985)
- Chad Wackerman – Forty Reasons (1991), The View (1993), Dreams Nightmares and Improvisations (2012)
- Roger Waters – Amused to Death (1992)
- Gary Wright – Who Am I (1988 – four tracks)
- Yoshida Brothers – Renaissance (2004)

Selected individual tracks:

- Peter Cetera – "Even A Fool Can See" from the album World Falling Down
- Ray Charles – "If I Could" from the album My World
- Al Jarreau – "Something You Said" from the album Tomorrow Today
- Madonna – "I'll Remember" – (from the soundtrack of the film With Honors)
- Aaron Neville – "That's The Way She Loves" from the album Warm Your Heart
- Rod Stewart – "Broken Arrow" from the album Vagabond Heart
- Aretha Franklin - "Let it be" from the album Soul Queen
