= The Sixteen Men of Tain =

Studio album by Allan Holdsworth
- Released: March 2000
- Recorded: Late 1999
- Studios: The Brewery, North County, San Diego
- Genre: Jazz fusion
- Length: 44:50
- Label: Gnarly Geezer
- Producer: Allan Holdsworth

Allan Holdsworth chronology
I.O.U. Live (1997)	The Sixteen Men of Tain (2000)	Flat Tire: Music for a Non-Existent Movie (2001)

Alternative cover
- Remastered edition

The Sixteen Men of Tain is the tenth studio album by guitarist Allan Holdsworth, released in March 2000 through Gnarly Geezer Records (United States), Polydor Records (Japan) and JMS–Cream Records (Europe); a special edition containing two bonus tracks was reissued in 2003 through Globe Music Media Arts. The album's title is a reference to the Glenmorangie distillery in Tain, Scotland. The Sixteen Men of Tain was the last recording to be made at Holdsworth's personal recording studio, The Brewery.

== Critical reception ==
Professional ratings
Review scores
Source	Rating
All About Jazz	Favourable
AllMusic	4.5/5 stars

All About Jazz described The Sixteen Men of Tain as a "very comfortable listen" and recommended it highly, whilst noting that the album is less rock-oriented than past Holdsworth releases. David R. Adler at AllMusic awarded the album 4.5 stars out of 5, calling it "startlingly superb" and "full of fresh ideas and unadulterated improvisational brilliance". Both reviews also highlighted Holdsworth's more restrained use of the SynthAxe, an instrument featured prominently on all of his albums since Atavachron (1986).

== Track listing ==
All music is composed by Allan Holdsworth, except where noted.

No.	Title	Length
1.	"0274"	7:46
2.	"The Sixteen Men of Tain"	6:26
3.	"Above and Below"	3:08
4.	"The Drums Were Yellow" (Holdsworth, Gary Novak)	5:57
5.	"Texas"	5:44
6.	"Downside Up" (Chad Wackerman)	7:07
7.	"Eidolon"	4:36
8.	"Above and Below (Reprise)"	4:06
Total length:		44:50

2003 special edition
No.	Title	Length
1.	"San Onofre"	5:10
2.	"0274"	7:46
3.	"The Sixteen Men of Tain"	6:26
4.	"Above and Below"	3:08
5.	"The Drums Were Yellow" (Holdsworth, Gary Novak)	5:57
6.	"Texas"	5:44
7.	"Downside Up" (Chad Wackerman)	7:07
8.	"Eidolon"	4:36
9.	"Above and Below (Reprise)"	4:06
10.	"Material Unreal"	2:00
Total length:		52:00

== Personnel ==
- Allan Holdsworth – guitar, SynthAxe, engineering, mixing, production
- Gary Novak – drums (except "Downside Up")
- Chad Wackerman – drums ("Downside Up")
- Dave Carpenter – bass
- Walt Fowler – trumpet
- Duncan Aldrich – engineering
- Chris Bellman – mastering
