= All Night Wrong =

Live album by Allan Holdsworth
- Released: 4 September 2002
- Recorded: 5 May 2002
- Venue: Roppongi Pit Inn, Tokyo
- Genre: Jazz fusion
- Length: 55:53
- Label: Sony
- Producer: Akira Yoda, Hiroya Tsubaki, Yasohachi Itoh

Allan Holdsworth chronology
| Flat Tire: Music for a Non-Existent Movie (2001) | All Night Wrong (2002) | Then! (2003) |

All Night Wrong is the first official live album by guitarist Allan Holdsworth, released in 2002 through Sony Music Entertainment (Japan) and in 2003 through Steve Vai's Favored Nations Entertainment (United States). The album was recorded on 5 May 2002 at the Roppongi Pit Inn in Tokyo, Japan.

== Reception ==
Professional ratings
Review scores
| Source | Rating |
|---|---|
| AllMusic | 4/5 stars |
| The Guardian | 3/5 stars |
| The Virgin Encyclopedia of Jazz | 3/5 stars |

In a review for AllMusic, Glenn Astarita wrote: "Holdsworth's climactically driven legato-based riffs are intact, as he also implements jazzy chord voicings and delicately stated fabrics of sound. But the trio raises the ante throughout many of these pieces, awash with moments of nuance and controlled firepower."

The Guardian's John Fordham stated that Holdsworth's "atmospheric ambient-chord sounds over cymbal washes are very dramatic... and the range of his melodic imagination backed by storming technique is always breathtaking." However, he noted: "there's just too much unbroken heavy-metalwork and wall-to-wall drums."

Writing for JazzTimes, Stuart Nicholson remarked: "Virtually cliché-free, Holdsworth isn't someone you can categorize... His uncompromising music doesn't come to you; you have to go to it."

Matt Fripp of Jazzfuel called the album "electrifying," serving as "a great introduction to Allan Holdsworth's musical style." He commented: "Virtuosic legato single line passages weave in and out of complex time signatures, the rhythm section of Wackerman and Johnson interacting throughout with Holdsworth."

== Track listing ==
All tracks are written by Allan Holdsworth, except where noted.

| No. | Title | Length |
|---|---|---|
| 1. | "Lanyard Loop" | 5:46 |
| 2. | "The Things You See" | 6:53 |
| 3. | "Alphrazallan" | 7:04 |
| 4. | "Funnels" | 5:01 |
| 5. | "Zone" (Holdsworth, Steve Hunt, Gary Husband, Jimmy Johnson) | 9:19 |
| 6. | "Water on the Brain Pt.II" | 5:30 |
| 7. | "Above & Below" | 8:21 |
| 8. | "Gas Lamp Blues" | 7:59 |
| Total length: | | 55:53 |

== Personnel ==
- Allan Holdsworth – guitar
- Chad Wackerman – drums
- Jimmy Johnson – bass

Technical

- Yoshihiro Suzuki – engineering
- Hiroyuki Shiotsuki – engineering
- Mitsuru Kasai – engineering
- Hideyasu Hatagoshi – engineering
- Akinori Kikuchi – engineering
- Koji Suzuki – mastering
- Akira Yoda – production
- Hiroya Tsubaki – production
- Yasohachi Itoh – executive production
