= Thru the Years =

Compilation album by John Mayall
- Released: October 1971
- Recorded: February 1965 – April 1968
- Genre: Blues
- Length: 43:00
- Label: Decca Records (Single L.P. Decca SKL 5086); London Records (Double L.P. London 2PS 600)
- Producer: John Mayall, Mike Vernon

John Mayall chronology
Memories (1971)	Thru the Years (1971)	Jazz Blues Fusion (1972)

Professional ratings
Review scores
Source	Rating
AllMusic	4.5/5 stars
The Penguin Guide to Blues Recordings	2.5/4 stars

Thru the Years is a compilation album of music by John Mayall released in October 1971 by Decca Records in the U.K. and London Records in the U.S.A. The album was the second compilation to be issued by Decca/London with Mayall's blessing, although his contract with them had ceased. It features a mixture of previously unissued songs or non-album tracks that had only been released as singles.

The album reached No. 164 on the Billboard 200. It was re-released by Deram on CD in 1990.

== Track listing ==
1. "Crocodile Walk" (John Mayall) – 2:14
2. "My Baby Is Sweeter" (Willie Dixon) – 2:59
3. "Crawling Up a Hill" (version one) (John Mayall) – 2:15
4. "Mama, Talk to Your Daughter" (J.B. Lenoir) – 2:58
5. "Alabama Blues" (J.B. Lenoir) – 2:29
6. "Out of Reach" (Peter Green) – 4:42
7. "Greeny" (Peter Green) – 3:54
8. "Curly" (Peter Green) – 4:50
9. "Missing You" (Peter Green) – 1:57
10. "Please Don't Tell" (John Mayall) – 2:26
11. "Your Funeral and My Trial" (Sonny Boy Williamson II) – 3:55
12. "Suspicions" (part one) (John Mayall) – 2:47
13. "Knockers Step Forward" (John Mayall, Mick Taylor) – 3:12
14. "Hide and Seek" (John Mayall, Hank Williams) – 2:22

== Personnel ==
- John Mayall – guitar, harmonica, keyboards, organ, vocals
- Roger Dean – guitar (1, 2)
- Bernie Watson – guitar (3)
- Peter Green – guitar, harmonica, vocals (4–11)
- Mick Taylor – guitar (12–14)
- John McVie – bass (1–4, 6–11)
- Paul Williams – bass (12)
- Tony Reeves – bass (13–14)
- Hughie Flint – drums (1–2)
- Martin Hart – drums (3)
- Aynsley Dunbar – drums (4, 6–11)
- Keef Hartley – drums (12)
- Jon Hiseman – drums (13–14)
- Dick Heckstall-Smith – tenor saxophone (12–13), soprano saxophone (12)
- Chris Mercer – tenor saxophone (12–13)
- Henry Lowther – trumpet (13)

Other credits

- Gus Dudgeon – engineer
- Bill Price – engineer
- John Tracy – liner notes
- Derek Varnals – engineer
- Mike Vernon – producer
