= I.O.U. Live =

Live album by Allan Holdsworth
- Released: 15 April 1997
- Recorded: 14 May 1984
- Venue: Yubin Chokin Hall, Tokyo
- Genre: Jazz fusion
- Length: 57:03
- Label: Cleopatra

Allan Holdsworth chronology
Heavy Machinery (1996)	I.O.U. Live (1997)	The Sixteen Men of Tain (2000)

I.O.U. Live is a live album by guitarist Allan Holdsworth, released on 15 April 1997 through Cleopatra Records. According to Holdsworth, the tracks were taken from video footage of a 1984 concert in Japan, which later became a bootleg circulating under the name of Tokyo Dream: Allan Holdsworth in Japan. He therefore considered it an unauthorised release and not part of his discography.

== Track listing ==
All tracks are written by Allan Holdsworth, except where noted

No.	Title	Length
1.	"Road Games"	4:25
2.	"White Line" (Holdsworth, Gerry Brown)	7:02
3.	"Panic Station" (lyrics: Paul Williams)	4:14
4.	"Letters of Marque"	6:41
5.	"Material Real"	7:30
6.	"Metal Fatigue" (lyrics: Paul Williams)	5:10
7.	"Where Is One?"	8:02
8.	"The Things You See"	7:01
9.	"Was There (Something)"	6:58
Total length:		57:03

== Personnel ==
- Allan Holdsworth – guitar
- Paul Williams – vocals
- Chad Wackerman – drums
- Jimmy Johnson – bass
