= Rochester International Jazz Festival =

Music festival in Rochester, New York

Coordinates: 43.162064°N 77.616846°W

- Genre: Jazz
- Dates: June
- Location: Rochester, New York
- Years active: 2002-Present
- Founders: John Nugent, Marc Iacona
- Website: Official website

The Rochester International Jazz Festival is a music festival held in June each year in Rochester, New York. The nine-day festival is held at multiple venues throughout downtown Rochester's East End cultural and entertainment district, including Kodak Hall at Eastman Theatre and Kilbourn Hall at the Eastman School of Music - all within walking distance and many on "Jazz Street" (otherwise known as Gibbs Street during the rest of the year), which is closed off for the festival's nine days.

In 2008, attendance was estimated at a record 125,000 for the nearly 250 concerts presented.

In 2010, 162,000 people attended the Xerox Rochester International Jazz Festival's 250 concerts presented over nine days, breaking the record set the prior year of 133,000.

2011 saw another record-setting year with 285 concerts presented over nine days and in 18 different venues. Attendance reached an all-time high of 182,000.

In 2012, the 11th Edition hit another attendance record of 187,000, a record number of headliner sell-outs and the addition of a new venue, Hatch Recital Hall. Norah Jones, Diana Krall, Steve Martin & The Steep Canyon Rangers, Esperanza Spalding, Zappa Plays Zappa, and Daryl Hall "Live From Daryl's House" with special guest Keb' Mo' headlined this year.

In 2018, the festival drew a record-setting crowd of more than 208,000 people from around the world to see more than 1500 musicians from 20 countries performed in 320+ shows.

In 2019, the festival also drew more than 208,000 to see 1750+ musicians from around the world perform in 325+ shows.

CGI Communications became the festival's title sponsor as of July 2018, succeeding Xerox, which was the title sponsor for 10 years from 2009 through 2018. M&T Bank is the presenting sponsor. In 2024 Rochester Regional Health (RRH) succeeded CGI and became the festival's title sponsor.

== Festival history ==
Year	Days	Headliners	No. of shows	No. of venues	Est. attendance	Notes
2002	7	Aretha Franklin; Average White Band; The Blues Brothers Band; Dr. John; Norah Jones; The Rippingtons; Sonny Rollins	50	14	15,000	Jones was booked as an up-and-comer, before her debut album was released—but she performed as a new superstar after it became a runaway success; Franklin concert held at Frontier Field; Chris Botti opened for The Rippingtons
2003	10	Tony Bennett; George Benson; Dave Brubeck; Al Jarreau; Spyro Gyra		14	30,000	
2004	9	Yolanda Adams; Stanley Clarke; Al Di Meola; Bobby McFerrin; Marian McPartland; Oscar Peterson; Jean-Luc Ponty; David Sanborn			55,000	First year that Gibbs Street was renamed "Jazz Street"; first year for the RIJF Big Tent
2005	9	The Bad Plus; Chris Botti & Madeleine Peyroux; Dave Brubeck; Chick Corea; Sonny Rollins			65,000	
2006	9	Woody Allen; James Brown; Etta James			80,000	First year club passes sold out
2007	9	Dave Brubeck Quartet; Dr. John and Madeleine Peyroux; Jerry Lee Lewis; Wynton Marsalis & Lincoln Center Jazz Orchestra; Raul Midon and "King" Solomon Burke; Jean-Luc Ponty, Trio Beyond	200+	18	120,000	First year for Nordic Jazz Now
2008	9	Al Green; Medeski Martin & Wood; Boz Scaggs			125,000	Jake Shimabukuro, Carolyn Wonderland, and Catherine Russell also appeared
2009	9	Dave Brubeck; Michael McDonald; Smokey Robinson; Jake Shimabukuro & Carolyn Wonderland; Susan Tedeschi & Taj Mahal	225		133,000	First year with Xerox as title sponsor
2010	9	Jeff Beck; Herbie Hancock; Keb' Mo'; Gladys Knight; John Pizzarelli; Bernie Williams	250	15	162,000	A second Jeff Beck concert was added after the first sold out; club passes also sold out in advance; Trombone Shorty appeared; Smash Mouth closes
2011	9	Chris Botti; Natalie Cole; Elvis Costello; The Fab Faux; Béla Fleck and the Flecktones k.d. lang	285	18	182,000	Club passes sold out two months in advance; Kevin Eubanks appears; Trombone Shorty plays a free show; G Love and Special Sauce close out the festival
2012	9	Daryl Hall with Keb' Mo'; Norah Jones; Diana Krall; Steve Martin & the Steep Canyon Rangers; Esperanza Spalding; Zappa Plays Zappa	> 300	19	187,000	A second Steve Martin concert was added after the first sold out; club passes sold out four-and-a-half months in advance, before shows were even announced; Trombone Shorty appears for the third straight year
2013	9	David Byrne & St. Vincent; Peter Frampton with Robert Cray; Roger Hodgson; Bob James & David Sanborn with Steve Gadd; Willie Nelson and Family; Pink Martini	280	19	195,000	Trombone Shorty again closes the festival with a free concert
2014	9	Earth, Wind & Fire; Fourplay; Buddy Guy; Steve Martin & the Steep Canyon Rangers ft. Edie Brickell; Michael McDonald; Janelle Monáe	322	20	196,000	Just as in 2012, a second Steve Martin show was added after the first quickly sold out; Bob James appears for second straight year, this time as a member of Fourplay
2015	9	Herb Alpert and Lani Hall; Gary Clark, Jr., with Beth Hart; Steve Gadd Band with special surprise guest Jennifer Hudson; Diana Krall; Steep Canyon Rangers; Tedeschi Trucks Band with Sharon Jones & The Dap-Kings and Doyle Bramhall	> 325	19	TBA	James Taylor was Gadd's surprise guest; Blood, Sweat & Tears and Trombone Shorty among free concerts; Yellowjackets, Joey Alexander, and Grace Kelly among the club shows Steve Gadd's 70th birthday concert was recorded and later released as a Grammy-nominated album, Way Back Home: Live from Rochester, NY
2016	9	Gregg Allman; Erykah Badu; Chris Botti; Chick Corea "Trilogy" Trio with Joey Alexander; Bruce Hornsby & The Noisemakers; Grace Potter	325	18	205,000	Trombone Shorty again closes the festival with a free concert
2017	9	Sheryl Crow; King Crimson; Maceo Parker and the Ray Charles Orchestra ft. The Raelettes; Postmodern Jukebox; Mavis Staples; Joss Stone; Monty Alexander	TBA	TBA	TBA	
2018	9	Béla Fleck and the Flecktones; Alison Krauss; Lake Street Dive; Seal; Boz Scaggs; Jill Scott	300+	20	208,000	
2019	9	George Benson; Marc Cohn w/ The Blind Boys of Alabama; Steve Gadd; Jeff Goldblum & the Mildred Snitzer Orchestra; Patti LaBelle; Steve Miller Band	320+	20	TBA	Club shows include Downchild Blues Band's 50th anniversary tour with Dan Aykroyd; Yellowjackets; Acoustic Alchemy; and Jake Shimabukuro. Trombone Shorty & Orleans Avenue again close the festival, their seventh festival appearance.
2020	9	Garth Fagan Dance; Puss n Boots ft. Sasha Dobson, Norah Jones, Catherine Popper; Nile Rogers & Chic; Spyro Gyra; Trombone Shorty & Orleans Avenue; Wynonna & the Big Noise w/ Country Tribute Celebration	0	0	0	Rescheduled to October (to be held at Rochester Institute of Technology) then canceled entirely, due to the COVID-19 pandemic. Puss n Boots member Norah Jones previously headlined the festival as a solo act in 2002 and 2012.
2021	9		0	0	0	Puss n Boots and Spyro Gyra were confirmed for 2021 before the event was canceled due to the ongoing pandemic.
2022	9	Devon Allman Project w/ Dirty Dozen Brass Band & Samantha Fish; The Bacon Brothers; Chris Botti; Sheila E. Tommy Emmanuel; G Love & Special Sauce; Drew Holcomb and the Neighbors; New Power Generation; Spyro Gyra; Booker T Presents: A Soul Stax Revue; Robin Thicke	325	20	210,000	All headline concerts held outdoors, without tickets or admission cost. Wynonna Judd was scheduled as a headliner before cancelling after the death of her mother. She was replaced by Drew Holcomb and the Neighbors. Chris Botti appears for the fifth time, third time as a solo headliner; Devon Allman is the son of 2016 headliner Gregg Allman; G Love & Special Sauce previously played a free concert in 2011.
2023	9	Keb' Mo'; Pat Metheny; Bonnie Raitt	300	19	211,000	Keb' Mo' previously headlined in 2010 and 2012 (the latter with Daryl Hall). Several outdoor shows were labeled as "Free Headliners" but the three indoor shows listed here were the only ticketed events.
2024	9	Samara Joy; Laufey; Taj Mahal; John Oates; Lee Ritenour Band with Randy Brecker & Bill Evans	326	20	> 200,000	Taj Mahal previously headlined in 2009. Samara Joy appeared in 2022 and 2023 in club shows and is now headlining. Shiela E. returns for a free outdoor headline show.
2025	9	Rickie Lee Jones; Wynton Marsalis & the Jazz at Lincoln Center Orchestra; Smokey Robinson; Thundercat; The Wood Brothers	TBA	TBA	TBD	Wynton Marsalis and the Lincoln Center Jazz Orchestra previously headlined in 2007. Smokey Robinson previously headlined in 2009.
2026	9	Chris Botti; Count Basie Orchestra; Gladys Knight	300+	19	211,000	This is Chris Botti's sixth appearance at the festival. Gladys Knight previously headlined in 2010. Trombone Shorty & Orleans Avenue once again close with a free show.
2027	9	Patti LaBelle; The Marcus King Band	TBA	TBA	TBD	Patti LaBelle previously headlined in 2019.

- Table data gleaned from and

== Past performers ==
- Woody Allen and his New Orleans Jazz Band
- Tony Bennett
- Ravi Coltrane
- Chaka Khan
- Al Jarreau
- The Respect Sextet
- Chris Botti
- Bobby McFerrin & Jack DeJohnette
- Bill Frisell
- Al (Roomful of Blues) Copley
- Sonny Rollins
- Chick Corea
- Hilton Ruiz
- Madeleine Peyroux
- Steve Turre
- Strunz & Farah
- Aretha Franklin
- Charles Ellison Quartet
- Sonny Rollins
- Dr. John
- Dave Brubeck
- George Benson
- Stephane Wrembel
- Norah Jones
- The Carnegie Hall Jazz Band led by Jon Faddis
- John Hammond
- Willem Breuker
- Michael Moore
- Harold Danko
- Dave Pietro & Banda Brazil
- Wallace Roney
- Paul Smoker
- Juana Molina
- Derek Trucks
- Gap Mangione
- Harry Allen
- Lew Tabackin
- Paula West Quartet
- Joe LaBarbera
- Jonas Kullhammar Quartet
- autorickshaw
- Raul Midón
- Wycliffe Gordon
- The Shuffle Demons
- Marian McPartland
- Dave Mancini Quartet
- David Sanborn
- Oscar Peterson
- James Brown
- Das Contras
- Phil Woods
- McCoy Tyner
- Toots Thielemans
- Wayne Shorter
- Susan Tedeschi
- Etta James
- Little Feat
- Soulive
- Dickey Betts
- Dianne Reeves
- Slide Hampton
- Medeski Martin and Wood
