= Blues for Tony =

Live album by Allan Holdsworth, Alan Pasqua, Jimmy Haslip, and Chad Wackerman
- Released: 2009
- Recorded: 2007
- Genre: Jazz fusion
- Length: 1:30:16
- Labels: Moonjune Records; MJR029
- Producers: Alan Pasqua, Allan Holdsworth, Chad Wackerman, Jimmy Haslip

Blues for Tony is a live album by guitarist Allan Holdsworth, keyboardist Alan Pasqua, bassist Jimmy Haslip, and drummer Chad Wackerman. It was recorded in 2007, and was released as a double CD set by Moonjune Records in 2009. The album, which is dedicated to drummer Tony Williams, was issued after the release of a DVD titled Live At Yoshi's, featuring the same personnel. Pasqua appears on Holdsworth's first solo album (Velvet Darkness), and both Holdsworth and Pasqua were members of the New Tony Williams Lifetime during the mid-1970s, recording two albums with that band, Believe It (1975) and Million Dollar Legs (1976).

== Reception ==
Professional ratings
Review scores
Source	Rating
AllMusic	4/5 stars
All About Jazz	4/5 stars

In a review for AllMusic, Alex Henderson wrote: "this quartet... demonstrates that being influenced by rock and funk and making extensive use of electric instruments doesn't mean that a group cannot maintain a jazz mentality. In fact, Blues for Tony thrives on a jazz mentality. Improvisation and spontaneity prevail, and... the quartet's amplified performances can easily be described as 'the sound of surprise'... Blues for Tony is an album that fusion lovers shouldn't miss."

Background Magazine's Pedro Bekkers stated: "For us fusion lovers, this album is a showcase of what happens when you put four of the finest fusion players on a stage. I just love this kind of music!"

S. Victor Aaron of Something Else! singled out Holdsworth's "Fred" for praise, and commented: "'Fred' assumes virtuosic power and control. Balls-out fusion when done right can be as much of a pleasure to rock along to as much it can be to marvel at. That's what Holdsworth, Pasqua and their two in-demand surrogates did for AH's enduring classic. There's no better way they could fete the late, great Tony Williams."

== Track listings ==
=== Disc 1 ===
1. "Blues for Tony" (Alan Pasqua) – 11:12
2. "The Fifth" (Chad Wackerman) – 8:58
3. "It Must Be Jazz" (Alan Pasqua, Allan Holdsworth, Chad Wackerman, Jimmy Haslip) – 8:38
4. "Fred" (Allan Holdsworth) – 9:56
5. "Guitar Intro" (Allan Holdsworth) – 3:35
6. "Pud Wud" (Allan Holdsworth) – 9:59

=== Disc 2 ===
1. "Looking Glass" (Allan Holdsworth) – 10:07
2. "To Jaki, George and Thad" (Alan Pasqua) – 4:51
3. "San Michele" (Alan Pasqua) – 11:31
4. "Protocosmos" (Alan Pasqua) – 5:46
5. "Red Alert" (Alan Pasqua) – 5:50

== Personnel ==
- Allan Holdsworth – guitar
- Alan Pasqua – keyboards
- Jimmy Haslip – bass
- Chad Wackerman – drums
