= Paul Carmichael =

English bass guitarist

- Born: London, England
- Genres: Jazz fusion, world music
- Occupations: Musician, composer
- Instruments: Bass, keyboards
- Years active: 1970s to present
- Website: paulcarmichael.com

Paul Carmichael is an English bass guitarist and composer.

== Career ==
In his early 20s, Carmichael joined the jazz-rock band Nucleus to play on tour in Germany. He has also toured with Soft Machine and Barbara Thompson's Paraphernalia. In the 1980s he was in the house band for the children's TV show Play Away.

In 1979, he joined the guitarist Allan Holdsworth in the group I.O.U. and recorded the critically acclaimed album I.O.U..

In 2011, he released the album Wax is Melting which features the Incognito vocalist Vanessa Haynes.

== Discography ==
- Wax is Melting (2011) featuring Vanessa Haynes
- In the Distance (2011)

With Allan Holdsworth

- I.O.U. (1982)

With Gary Husband

- What It Is (Live in the studio circa 1980) (1998)

With Steve Topping

- Time and Distance (1997)
