= Way Back Home: Live from Rochester, NY =

Live album by Steve Gadd Band
- Released: September 16, 2016
- Recorded: June 25, 2015
- Venue: Kodak Hall at the Eastman Theatre
- Genre: Jazz
- Length: 67:05
- Label: BFM Jazz

Steve Gadd Band chronology
70 Strong (2015)	Way Back Home: Live from Rochester, NY (2016)

Way Back Home: Live from Rochester, NY is an album of jazz music by the Steve Gadd Band, recorded live at the 2015 Rochester International Jazz Festival in Gadd's hometown. It was nominated for the 2017 Grammy Award for Best Contemporary Instrumental Album.
