= Metal Fatigue (album) =

Studio album by Allan Holdsworth
- Released: 1985
- Studios: Music Grinder Studios, Mad Hatter Studios, Los Angeles; Front Page Recorders, Costa Mesa, California
- Genre: Jazz fusion
- Length: 37:40
- Label: Enigma
- Producer: Allan Holdsworth

Allan Holdsworth chronology
Road Games (1983)	Metal Fatigue (1985)	Atavachron (1986)

Metal Fatigue is the third studio album by guitarist Allan Holdsworth, released in 1985 through Enigma Records (United States) and JMS–Cream Records (Europe).

== Critical reception ==
Professional ratings
Review scores
Source	Rating
AllMusic	4.5/5 stars

Daniel Gioffre of AllMusic awarded Metal Fatigue 4.5 stars out of 5, calling it "One of the most important fusion records of the '80s" and "Holdsworth's best work. [...] Absolutely essential for those who like their rock with a healthy dose of jazz". The title track was listed as one of the highlights, as well as the contributions of drummer Chad Wackerman and bassist Jimmy Johnson, whom he described as "virtuosos in their own right".

Spin wrote, "Each extended jam has a purpose, and it's not music only those with a lifetime subscription to Guitar Player can appreciate. There are a few weak spots on the record—like every time a vocalist pipes in."

== Track listing ==
All lyrics are written by Paul Williams, except where noted; all music is composed by Allan Holdsworth.

No.	Title	Length
1.	"Metal Fatigue"	4:56
2.	"Home"	5:33
3.	"Devil Take the Hindmost"	5:36
4.	"Panic Station"	3:36
5.	"The Un-Merry-Go-Round"	14:10
6.	"In the Mystery" (lyrics: Paul Korda)	3:49
Total length:		37:40

== Personnel ==
- Allan Holdsworth – guitar, engineering, producer
- Paul Williams – vocals (tracks 1, 4)
- Paul Korda – vocals (track 6)
- Alan Pasqua – keyboard
- Chad Wackerman – drums (tracks 1–4)
- Gary Husband – drums (track 5)
- "Mac Hine" – drum machine (track 6)
- Jimmy Johnson – bass (tracks 1–4, 6)
- Gary Willis – bass (track 5)

Technical

- Robert Feist – engineering
- Dan Humann – engineering
- Dennis McKay – engineering
- Biff Vincent – engineering
- Gary Wagner – engineering
- Francois Bardol – cover art
