= Dave Carpenter =

American bass player

- Born: November 4, 1959
- Died: June 24, 2008 (aged 48)
- Genres: Jazz; Rock; Pop
- Occupation: Musician
- Instruments: Bass guitar, Double bass

Dave Carpenter (November 4, 1959 – June 24, 2008) was an American bass player. During his early professional career he played with jazz musicians Buddy Rich, Maynard Ferguson and Woody Herman. During the late 1990s he was a touring member of the Allan Holdsworth Group. In Los Angeles studios he performed on over two hundred recordings, including television, film theme and soundtracks.

== Biography ==
After studying music at Ohio State University, he launched his professional career by moving to New York City. It was there that he first toured and recorded with artists such as Buddy Rich, Woody Herman and Maynard Ferguson.

Carpenter appeared on countless sessions and had dozens of television, film themes and soundtracks to his recording credit. He worked with artists such as Allan Holdsworth, Steve Hass, Peter Erskine, Pino Daniele, Joel Taylor, Mike Stern, Scott Henderson, Mitchel Forman, Eric Marienthal, Lee Ritenour, Tom Scott, Rita Coolidge, Russ Freeman, Rod Stewart, Johnny Mathis, Barbra Streisand, David Benoit, Boz Scaggs, Shakira, Dick Halligan and many more. He also appeared as a soloist with the Los Angeles and Berlin Philharmonics as well as the Tanglewood and BBC Scottish Symphony Orchestra and was a founding member of the "Lounge Art Ensemble" with Erskine and Bob Sheppard.

Carpenter died suddenly of a heart attack at the age of 48.

== Collaborations ==
With Allan Holdsworth

- The Sixteen Men of Tain (Gnarly Geezer, 2000)
- Leverkusen '97 (WDR, 2021)

With Barbra Streisand

- Christmas Memories (Columbia Records, 2001)

With Al Jarreau

- Accentuate the Positive (GRP, 2004)

With Johnny Rivers

- Shadows On the Moon (Soul City, 2009)

With Eric Marienthal

- Got You Covered! (Peak Records, 2004)

With Rita Coolidge

- And So Is Love (Paddle Wheel, 2005)

With Rob Mullins

- Tokyo Nights (Nova, 1990)

With Toni Childs

- Keep the Faith (Hanalei Music Company, 2009)

With Jesse McCartney

- Right Where You Want Me (Hollywood Records, 2006)

With Boz Scaggs

- Fade Into Light (MVP Japan, 1996)

With Rod Stewart

- It Had to Be You: The Great American Songbook (J Records, 2002)

With Adam Cohen

- Mélancolista (Capitol Records, 2004)

With Bette Midler

- Bette Midler Sings the Peggy Lee Songbook (Columbia Records, 2005)
- Cool Yule (Columbia Records, 2006)

With James Taylor

- A Christmas Album (Hallmark Cards, 2004)
- James Taylor at Christmas (Columbia Records, 2006)

With Shakira

- Fijación Oral, Vol. 1 (Epic Records, 2005)

With Pino Daniele

- Passi d autore (SME, 2004)
