= With a Heart in My Song =

Studio album by Allan Holdsworth and Gordon Beck
- Released: 1988
- Recorded: May–June 1988
- Studios: The Brewery, North County, San Diego
- Genres: Jazz fusion, jazz
- Length: 40:44
- Label: JMS–Cream
- Producer: Allan Holdsworth

Allan Holdsworth chronology
Sand (1987)	With a Heart in My Song (1988)	Secrets (1989)

Gordon Beck chronology
Celebration (1985)	With a Heart in My Song (1988)	Dreams (1989)

Professional ratings
Review scores
Source	Rating
AllMusic	(no review)

With a Heart in My Song is the second collaborative studio album by guitarist Allan Holdsworth and pianist Gordon Beck, released in 1988 through JMS–Cream Records. Holdsworth and Beck had previously collaborated on The Things You See, released in 1980.

== Track listing ==
All music is composed by Gordon Beck, except where noted.

No.	Title	Length
1.	"Equus"	7:14
2.	"54, Duncan Terrace" (Allan Holdsworth)	5:13
3.	"Ain't No Grief (On the Southwest Chief)"	8:12
4.	"With a Heart in My Song"	6:17
5.	"999"	4:22
6.	"Sundays" (Allan Holdsworth)	3:56
7.	"So, So, Calypso"	5:30
Total length:		40:44

== Personnel ==
- Allan Holdsworth – guitar, SynthAxe, engineering, mixing, production
- Gordon Beck – keyboard
