= Velvet Darkness =

Studio album by Allan Holdsworth
- Released: 1976
- Recorded: 24–26 May, 18 June 1976
- Studio: Van Gelder Studio, Englewood Cliffs, New Jersey
- Genre: Jazz fusion
- Length: 30:03
- Label: CTI
- Producer: Creed Taylor

Allan Holdsworth chronology
| Velvet Darkness (1976) | The Things You See (1980) |

Velvet Darkness is the first studio album by guitarist Allan Holdsworth, released in 1976 through producer Creed Taylor's CTI Records.

The tracks for the album were originally recorded by engineer Rudy Van Gelder at his Van Gelder Studio in New Jersey. According to Holdsworth, this was done during a rehearsal session, after which the tapes were released by CTI without his or the other band members' consent. None of the musicians involved ever received royalties for their work. Holdsworth therefore considered the album an unauthorised release and not part of his discography.

== Critical reception ==
Professional ratings
Review scores
| Source | Rating |
|---|---|
| AllMusic | 1.5/5 stars |

John W. Patterson of AllMusic gave Velvet Darkness only 1.5 stars out of five, describing it as "an interesting snapshot of young stellar musicians doing their thing in a laid-back but energetic fusion-funk-rock groove", but more for completists and collectors. In his review of Holdsworth's 1982 album I.O.U., he also labelled Velvet Darkness as a "train-wreck disaster" and "infamous".

== Reissues ==
Velvet Darkness was reissued on CD in 1990 through the Epic Associated division of CBS/Columbia Records as part of their "Contemporary Jazz Masters" series. This version was completely remixed and remastered from the original session tapes. The remixing process (which was not indicated within the CD packaging) significantly changed the sound of some instruments, especially the drums. Also included are five alternative takes as bonus tracks.

== Track listing ==
All music is composed by Allan Holdsworth

| No. | Title | Length |
|---|---|---|
| 1. | "Good Clean Filth" | 5:22 |
| 2. | "Floppy Hat" | 2:47 |
| 3. | "Wish" | 4:21 |
| 4. | "Kinder" | 3:08 |
| 5. | "Velvet Darkness" | 4:43 |
| 6. | "Karzie Key" | 3:12 |
| 7. | "Last May" | 1:39 |
| 8. | "Gattox" | 4:51 |
| Total length: | | 30:03 |

1990 remastered edition bonus tracks
| No. | Title | Length |
|---|---|---|
| 1. | "Good Clean Filth" (alternate take) | 5:38 |
| 2. | "Kinder" (alternate take) | 3:07 |
| 3. | "Velvet Darkness" (alternate take) | 4:44 |
| 4. | "Karzie Key" (alternate take) | 2:15 |
| 5. | "Gattox" (alternate take) | 6:47 |

== Personnel ==
- Allan Holdsworth – guitar, violin
- Alan Pasqua – piano
- Alphonso Johnson – bass guitar
- Narada Michael Walden – drums

Production

- Creed Taylor – producer
- Rudy Van Gelder – engineer
- Seiji Kaneko – mastering
- Yoichi Nakao – producer (reissue)
