= Allan Holdsworth =

British jazz musician (1946–2017)

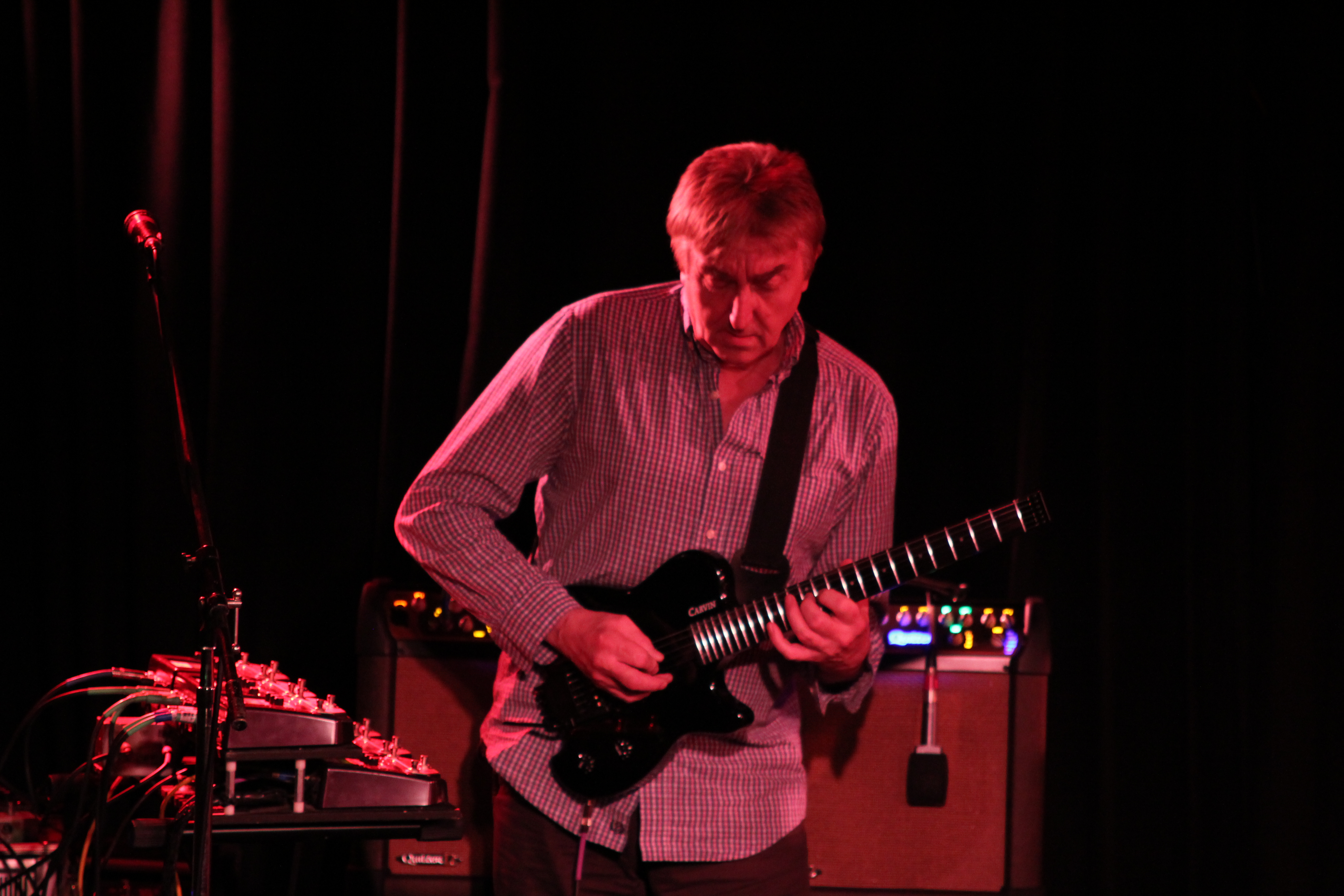
- Holdsworth in 2012

Background information
- Born: 6 August 1946; Bradford, West Riding of Yorkshire, England
- Died: 15 April 2017 (aged 70) Vista, California, US
- Genres: Jazz fusion; instrumental rock; progressive rock
- Occupations: Musician; composer; producer
- Instruments: Guitar; SynthAxe; violin
- Years active: 1969–2017
- Labels: CTI; JMS–Cream; Warner Bros.; Enigma; Relativity; Intima; Restless; Polydor; Gnarly Geezer; Megazoidal; Sony; Universal; Eidolon Efformation
- Formerly of: 'Igginbottom; Nucleus; Tempest; Soft Machine; The New Tony Williams Lifetime; Pierre Moerlen's Gong; John Stevens; Jean-Luc Ponty; Bill Bruford; U.K., Gordon Beck; Gary Husband; Jack Bruce; Chad Wackerman; HoBoLeMa; Level 42; Planet X; Anthony Crawford
External videos
- Oral History, Allan Holdsworth reflects on his worry that he'll some day wake up without new ideas. Interview date June 3, 2011, NAMM (National Association of Music Merchants) Oral History Library

Allan Holdsworth (6 August 1946 – 15 April 2017) was a British jazz and rock guitarist, violinist and composer. He contributed to numerous bands, including Soft Machine, U.K., The Tony Williams Lifetime, Pierre Moerlen's Gong, Bruford, Level 42, and Planet X, in addition to solo work in multiple genres.

Holdsworth was known for his esoteric and idiosyncratic usage of advanced music theory concepts, especially with respect to melody and harmony. His music incorporates a vast array of complex chord progressions, often using unusual chord shapes in an abstract way based on his understanding of "chord scales", and intricate improvised solos, frequently across shifting tonal centres. He used myriad scale forms often derived from those such as the Lydian, diminished, harmonic major, augmented, whole tone, chromatic and altered scales, among others, often resulting in an unpredictable and dissonant "outside" sound. His unique legato soloing technique stemmed from his original desire to play the saxophone, hence why he strove to use the guitar to create similarly smooth lines of notes. He also became associated with playing an early form of guitar synthesizer called the SynthAxe, made by a company he endorsed in the 1980s.

== Early life ==
Holdsworth was born in Bradford, where he was raised by his maternal grandparents, Sam and Elsie Holdsworth. He was raised in a house on Priestman Street, and went to the nearby Drummond Street Middle School. Sam Holdsworth was a jazz pianist who had previously moved to London to pursue a career in music, but had eventually returned to Bradford. Holdsworth was given his first guitar at the age of 17 and received his initial music tuition from his grandfather. His professional career began when he joined the Glen South Band, which performed on the Mecca club circuit across Northern England.

== Recording career ==
=== Early career and 1970s ===
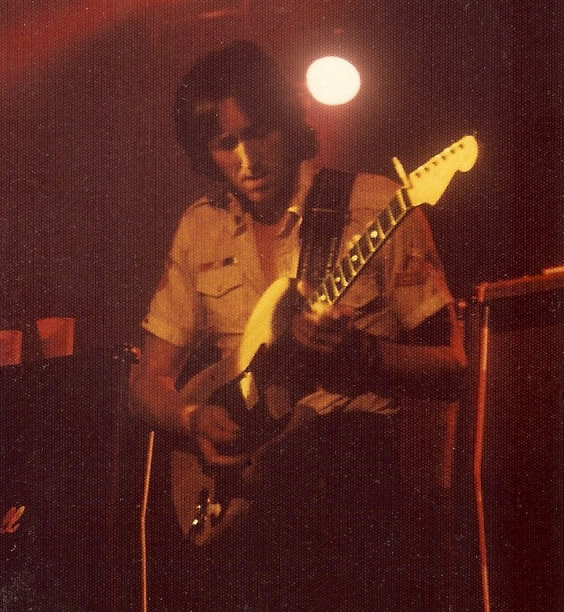
Holdsworth performing with U.K. at the Beacon Theatre, c. 1978

Holdsworth first recorded in 1969 with the band 'Igginbottom on their lone release, 'Igginbottom's Wrench (later reissued under the group name of "Allan Holdsworth & Friends"). In 1971 he joined Sunship, an improvisational band featuring keyboardist Alan Gowen, future King Crimson percussionist Jamie Muir and bassist Laurie Baker. They played live but never released any recorded material. Next came a brief stint with jazz rock band Nucleus, with whom Holdsworth played on their 1972 album, Belladonna; likewise with progressive rock band Tempest, on their self-titled first studio album in 1973. His playing can also be heard on a live BBC Radio concert from that year, which was released several decades later in 2005 as part of Under the Blossom: The Anthology, a Tempest compilation album most notable for the song "Gorgon". There has been an urban myth, propagated in part by the singer Donovan, that Holdsworth played the fuzztone solo on Donovan's 1968 hit "Hurdy Gurdy Man", but the solo was actually played by Alan Parker.

During the middle part of the decade, Holdsworth worked with various well-known progressive rock and jazz fusion artists, including Soft Machine (Bundles and Land of Cockayne), The New Tony Williams Lifetime (Believe It and Million Dollar Legs), Pierre Moerlen's Gong (Gazeuse!, Expresso II and Time is the Key), and Jean-Luc Ponty (Enigmatic Ocean), experiences he valued—especially his time spent with drummer Tony Williams. In 1976 came the first of Holdsworth's many frustrations with the music industry, when CTI Records released a recording of what Holdsworth thought was a rehearsal session as an official studio album, Velvet Darkness. This angered Holdsworth, who said decades later that he still loathed the album intensely and wished it were never made public.

In 1977, Holdsworth was recruited by drummer and Yes original member Bill Bruford to play on his debut album, Feels Good to Me (released January 1978). Shortly afterwards, Bruford formed the progressive rock supergroup U.K. with keyboardist/violinist Eddie Jobson and bassist John Wetton; Holdsworth was brought in on the recommendation of Bruford. Despite getting along well with them personally and enjoying the recording of their 1978 self-titled album, Holdsworth claims that he "detested" his time spent with the group, and that it was "miserable" due to numerous musical differences whilst on tour, namely Jobson and Wetton's desire for Holdsworth to play his solos to an organised structure for each show, something to which he vehemently objected.

1978 also saw Holdsworth do more traditional jazz material with a short-lived outfit named The Allan Holdsworth Quartet, which did a live recording for BBC Radio in that year under the program name "Live At The BBC." This group included Pat Smythe on piano, Darryl Runswick on bass, and Harold Fisher on drums.

Whilst U.K. continued with different musicians, Bruford returned to the core line-up of his solo band now simply named Bruford, with Holdsworth retained as guitarist. Their second album, One of a Kind, was released in 1979 and featured extensive contributions by Holdsworth, but by this point he wished to pursue his own musical aspirations and soon left the group, albeit with some reluctance.

=== 1980s ===
Holdsworth's first significant collaboration was with jazz pianist Gordon Beck on the latter's Sunbird album in 1979. Their first collaborative release The Things You See followed in 1980, and was a largely similar effort but without percussion or bass. Soon afterwards, Holdsworth joined up with drummer Gary Husband and bassist Paul Carmichael in a trio that became known as False Alarm. This was Holdsworth's first outing as a bandleader and, after the acquisition of former Tempest singer Paul Williams, the band was renamed I.O.U. Their self-titled debut album was released independently in 1982, followed by a mainstream reissue through Enigma Records in 1985.

Immediately after I.O.U.'s release, guitarist Eddie Van Halen brought Holdsworth to the attention of Warner Bros. Records executive Mo Ostin. Van Halen had previously enthused about Holdsworth in a 1980 issue of Guitar Player magazine, saying "That guy is bad! He's fantastic; I love him", and that Holdsworth was "the best, in my book". Furthermore, in a 1981 interview for Guitar World magazine, he said that "To me Allan Holdsworth is number one".

This resulted in the Warner Bros. release of Road Games, an EP, in 1983. It was produced by longtime Van Halen executive producer Ted Templeman, and received a nomination for Best Rock Instrumental Performance at the 1984 Grammy Awards. Holdsworth, however, disliked Road Games because of creative differences with Templeman. Former Cream singer Jack Bruce provided vocals on Road Games (Holdsworth and Bruce had played together with Billy Cobham, Didier Lockwood and David Sancious under the name A Gathering of Minds at Montreux in 1982), whilst the later incarnation of the I.O.U. band consisted of Paul Williams, drummer Chad Wackerman (who, along with Husband, would become a regular Holdsworth bandmember for the next three decades) and bassist Jeff Berlin.

Holdsworth was booked to perform at “Wolf and Rissmillers Country Club “, in Los Angeles, by Gary LoConti who later became Allan's manager for the next seven years. Having relocated permanently to Southern California LoConti negotiated a mutual parting of the ways with Warner Bros., allowing Allan to leave with the masters plus payment. LoConti then signed Holdsworth to Enigma (with sign on payment), for the 1985 release of Metal Fatigue (along with the aforementioned I.O.U. reissue). It was during this time that Flim & the BB's bassist Jimmy Johnson joined the band and, like Husband and Wackerman, remained a regular member of Holdsworth's touring bands until his death. Making his last appearance on vocals was Paul Williams, with whom Holdsworth claimed to have fallen out due to the selling of live bootlegs by Williams.

The Atavachron album in 1986 was a landmark release in that it was the first to feature Holdsworth's work with a brand new instrument named the SynthAxe. This unusually designed MIDI controller (different from a guitar synthesizer) would become a staple of Holdsworth's playing for the rest of his recording career, during which he would effectively become the public face of the instrument. The next year saw the release of a fourth album, Sand, which featured no vocals and showcased further SynthAxe experimentation. A second collaboration with Gordon Beck, With a Heart in My Song, followed in 1988.

In the late 1980s, Holdsworth set up his own recording studio named The Brewery in North County, San Diego, which would become one of the main recording locations for all of his studio albums beginning with Secrets in 1989, and throughout the 1990s. In a 2005 interview, he stated that he no longer owned the studio following his divorce in 1999. Secrets introduced pianist Steve Hunt, who went on to play keyboard as a member of Holdsworth's touring band, and for two further albums.

=== 1990s ===
A collaboration in 1990 with fusion guitarist Frank Gambale came about in the form of Truth in Shredding, an ambitious collaborative project put together by Mark Varney (brother of Shrapnel Records founder Mike Varney) through his Legato Records label. In December of that year, following the death of Level 42 guitarist Alan Murphy in 1989, Holdsworth was recruited by the band to play as a guest musician during a series of concerts at London's Hammersmith Odeon. With former I.O.U. partner Gary Husband now being the drummer for Level 42, these circumstances all led to Holdsworth contributing guitar work on five tracks for their 1991 album, Guaranteed. Holdsworth also played on Chad Wackerman's first two studio albums, Forty Reasons (1991) and The View (1993).

Holdsworth's first solo album of the decade was 1992's Wardenclyffe Tower, which continued to feature the SynthAxe but also displayed his newfound interest in self-designed baritone guitars built by luthier Bill DeLap. With the 1994 release of Hard Hat Area, Holdsworth's touring band for that and the following year was composed of Steve Hunt, Husband and bassist Skúli Sverrisson. A collaboration in 1996 with brothers Anders and Jens Johansson resulted in Heavy Machinery, an album with more hard-edged playing from Holdsworth than was usual. In the same year, he was once again joined by Gordon Beck on None Too Soon, which contained interpretations of some of Holdsworth's favourite jazz standards.

=== 2000s–2017 ===
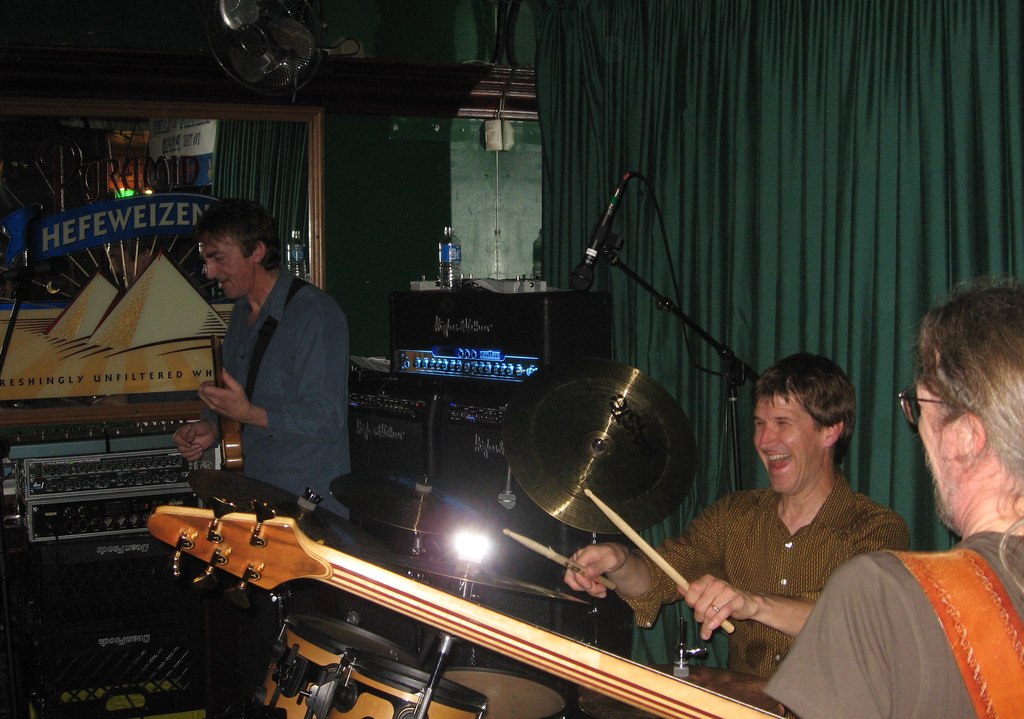
Holdsworth, Chad Wackerman (centre) and Jimmy Johnson (right) in Huntington Beach, 2006

The decade began positively with the release of The Sixteen Men of Tain in 2000, but it turned out to be Holdsworth's last album recorded at The Brewery. Immediately afterwards, he abruptly slowed his solo output due to events in his personal life. A pair of official live albums, All Night Wrong and Then!, were released in 2002 and 2003 respectively, along with a double compilation album, The Best of Allan Holdsworth: Against the Clock, in 2005.

His eleventh album, Flat Tire: Music for a Non-Existent Movie, was released in 2001. In a 2008 interview Holdsworth mentioned that a new studio album entitled Snakes and Ladders was slated for release in the same year through guitarist Steve Vai's Favored Nations label, but this did not happen. Further new material with Chad Wackerman and Jimmy Johnson was also said to be in the works. In a 2010 interview he claimed to have enough material for two albums, which he planned to begin recording after a show in Tel Aviv.

Throughout the latter half of the 2000s he extensively toured both North America and Europe, and played as a guest on albums by numerous artists. Notably, he was featured on keyboardist Derek Sherinian's 2004 album Mythology, as well as with the latter's progressive metal supergroup Planet X, on their 2007 album Quantum.

In 2006 and 2007 he performed with keyboardist Alan Pasqua, Wackerman and bassist Jimmy Haslip as part of a live tribute act in honour of the late Tony Williams, with whom Holdsworth and Pasqua had played in the mid-1970s; a DVD (Live at Yoshi's) and double album (Blues for Tony) of this tour were released in 2008 and 2009 respectively. Throughout 2008–10 he toured with drummers Terry Bozzio and Pat Mastelotto, and bassist Tony Levin as HoBoLeMa, a supergroup playing improvised experimental music. On 3 November 2011, Holdsworth performed in Mumbai as part of drummer Virgil Donati's touring band. The following year, Holdsworth joined Chad Wackerman for a third time on a studio album by the latter, for Dreams Nightmares and Improvisations.

In 2015, Holdsworth launched a PledgeMusic venture to release new studio material, as part of a collection named Tales from the Vault. The album appeared in July 2016.

On 7 April 2017, Manifesto records released the box set The Man Who Changed Guitar Forever! The Allan Holdsworth Album Collection, which comprises remastered versions of 12 of Allan's solo albums. These 12 albums also have been released in a vinyl box set under the name The Allan Holdsworth Solo Album Collection, marking the first time many of these albums have been available on vinyl. At the same time, Manifesto also released the 2-CD compilation Eidolon, which features tracks selected by Holdsworth himself.

According to The Guardian, Holdsworth played his final gig in San Diego on 10 April 2017.

=== Posthumous releases ===
Manifesto Records has released six posthumous albums as of 2022. All are archival live recordings sourced from jazz festivals or state broadcasters. Live in Japan 1984, released in 2018, is the first authorized release of the widely bootlegged "Tokyo Dream" laserdisc, with a limited edition bonus DVD. "Warsaw Summer Jazz Days '98", released in 2019, contains a CD and DVD of a concert that was originally broadcast on Polish TV. 2020 saw the release of "Frankfurt '86", a CD and DVD of Holdsworth's 1986 appearance at the Deutsches Jazz Festival. In 2021 two different concert recordings from Holdsworth's appearances at the Leverkusen Jazz Festival were released, the first from 1997 and the second from 2010. In 2022 Holdsworth's 2014 appearance at the Jarasum International Jazz Festival in Korea was released.

Holdsworth also appears on two tracks on German artist MSM Schmidt's 2017 album "Life", his latest studio recordings to be released as of 2019. Peter Lemer released the album "Jet Yellow" in 2019, featuring Holdsworth on the track "Dognose". This album was however recorded in 1977.

== Compositions and style ==
Holdsworth's solo compositions are primarily instrumental, but vocals were prominent on all his 1980s albums except Sand. Two of his most recurring singers were Paul Williams (featured on I.O.U., Road Games and Metal Fatigue) and Rowanne Mark (Atavachron and Secrets). Additionally, he sang lead vocals on Igginbottom's Wrench and The Things You See, something he never did again. Early in his career he occasionally played violin (Velvet Darkness, Sunbird, Temporary Fault, The Things You See, I.O.U., "The Man Who Waved at Trains" by Soft Machine and "Upon Tomorrow" by Tempest) and acoustic guitar (Bundles, Velvet Darkness, U.K., Gazeuse! and Metal Fatigue). He felt he was not proficient at acoustic guitar because its percussive tonal quality did not accommodate the kind of legato playing he favoured.

Holdsworth's playing style combined elements of jazz and progressive rock, and drew upon scale forms often derived from those such as the Lydian, harmonic major, diminished, augmented, whole tone, chromatic and altered scales. In an instructional video, he mentioned that he often played altered scales that are unusual to the average player, such as F minor major 7th with a raised 4th, while also displaying an ability to recognize such complex scales in chord form with voicings up and down the neck, with each note being a member of a family.

In his solos he extensively used various fast legato techniques such as slides, hammer-ons and pull-offs (the latter being a personalised method more akin to a "reversed" hammer-on); all of which produce a fluid lead sound. One of the reasons for his renowned emphasis on legato, as opposed to picking, stemmed from a desire to make the sound between picked and legato notes indistinguishable.

Another of his most identifiable traits was the use of rich, fingerpicked chords (often awash with delay, chorus and other complex effects), which were articulated and sustained using volume swells to create sounds reminiscent of the horn and saxophone. He said that he preferred both of these instruments to the guitar, the latter of which was not his first choice of instrument upon receiving one from his father when beginning to play music. It was because of this unfamiliarity with the guitar, combined with attempting to make it sound more like a saxophone, that he originally began to use legato without realising that it was not a common method of playing at the time. Furthermore, he was influenced greatly by such saxophonists as John Coltrane, Cannonball Adderley, Michael Brecker and Charlie Parker, while some of his favourite guitarists were Django Reinhardt, Joe Pass, Wes Montgomery, Jimmy Raney, Charlie Christian and Hank Marvin.

== Influence and reception ==
Holdsworth was highly influential among advanced guitarists, and was considered one of the most technically accomplished and most unusual players. According to Guitar World magazine, he is "as influential as Chuck Berry, Jimi Hendrix and Eddie Van Halen". Frank Zappa, Shawn Lane, Steve Vai, John Petrucci, Neal Schon, Gary Moore, and Van Halen have proclaimed Holdsworth one of the most advanced guitarists of his time. Zappa once lauded him as "one of the most interesting guys on guitar on the planet".

Robben Ford has said: "I think Allan Holdsworth is the John Coltrane of the guitar. I don't think anyone can do as much with the guitar as Allan Holdsworth can."

Other rock, metal and jazz guitarists who have cited Holdsworth as an influence include Joe Satriani, Greg Howe, Shawn Lane, Richie Kotzen, Alex Lifeson, Kurt Rosenwinkel, Yngwie Malmsteen, Michael Romeo, Ty Tabor, Fredrik Thordendal, Chris Poland, Daniel Mongrain, John Frusciante, Tom Morello, Tosin Abasi, and Patrick Mameli.

Despite such accolades, Holdsworth remained "not well known outside musicians' circles", and was criticised, even by guitarists, for not being musical enough and being too technical for the average listener. Holdsworth himself understood that his music did not gel with the majority of people and said "I don't think everybody would like it, for sure. But if people got to hear it, if even 20% liked it, I would be really happy with that." He once approached a major record label and was told by its producer that his music was "completely directionless," and how he did not approve of anything Holdsworth had ever done since he started making his own albums. Guthrie Govan has said of guitarists who aspire to play like Holdsworth: "I think it's potentially dangerous when a rock type player hears a bit of Allan Holdsworth or Frank Gambale and then dives straight into that style of playing; not only is the technical aspect daunting, there's also all that musical knowledge and understanding going on behind the scenes, and it's really hard to absorb both of those aspects at once without your playing just starting to sound worse."

Following Holdsworth's death, The Pods & Sods Network released a three-part tribute podcast featuring many of his contemporaries, friends and fans sharing personal stories, memories and tributes. Participants included Satriani, Gambale, Tabor, Steve Lukather, Jeff Watson, Chad Wackerman, Jean-Luc Ponty, Vernon Reid, Jennifer Batten, Dweezil Zappa, and Mike Keneally.

== Equipment ==
=== Guitars ===
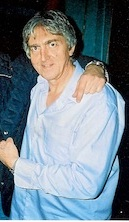
Holdsworth in 2007

Holdsworth worked with many different guitar manufacturers as he developed his sound, which he felt he was never able to perfect throughout his career. From the late 1960s through to his time spent with Tony Williams in the mid-1970s, his main instrument was the Gibson SG. He then switched to playing custom Fender Stratocaster guitars that were modified with humbucker pickups.

During his time with Soft Machine in the 1970s, Holdsworth approached various luthiers in England to make him a fretless guitar. It is thought that Holdsworth's incentive behind this approach was to achieve a greater level of legato. Holdsworth instead achieved this with use of the vibrato bar, by artificially adjusting the pitch while changing notes to achieve the desired fretless legato sound. This is also a technique by which Holdsworth was inspired by saxophonists, with large scoops in and out of phrases causing a jointed and smooth saxophone-like sound, without the need of a fretless guitar. With this revelation it is thought he abandoned the idea of the fretless guitar.

In 1984, Holdsworth developed his first signature guitars with Ibanez, known as the AH-10 and AH-20. They are Strat-style bodies with single pickup. These instruments have a semi-hollow body made from basswood with a hollow cavity underneath the pickguard, and can be heard on Metal Fatigue and Atavachron. He also developed a signature guitar with Charvel, also a single pickup guitar, called the "Charvel Holdsworth Original" which he played in the 1980s. His long association with Steinberger guitars began in 1987: these are made from graphite and carbon fibre, and distinctively have no headstock. With designer Ned Steinberger, he developed the GL2TA-AH signature model. He started playing customised headless guitars made by luthier Bill DeLap in the 1990s, which included an extended-range baritone model with a 38-inch scale length. However, he later said that he only owned one of the latter instruments (with a 34-inch scale). He also developed a line of signature guitars with Carvin Guitars, including the semi-hollow H2 in 1996, the completely hollow HF2 Fatboy in 1999, and the headless HH1 and HH2 models in 2013.

On Atavachron, Holdsworth first recorded with the SynthAxe—a fretted, guitar-like MIDI controller with keys, string triggers, and an additional tube-like input device named 'Masters Touch' (designed by Nyle Steiner, inventor of the EWI) which dynamically alters volume and tone using breath velocity. Sound-wise, he used patches that were mainly Oberheim synthesizers. He used the SynthAxe on all solo releases from Atavachron onwards, but later said he no longer wanted it as such an integral part of his playing—especially live—mainly because of it being so rare (fewer than 100 units still exist), and difficult to maintain and repair as a result.

=== Amplifiers ===
Allan Holdsworth's experimentation with amplifiers started early: "My father's friend built me my first amplifier. I used to love going to his place and watch him solder and such. This got me started in my interest in electronics."

Over the years, Allan Holdsworth used numerous amps, such as the Vox AC30 and a 50-watt Marshall with two 4x12 speaker cabinets. He liked the Marshalls for single-note soloing, but not for chords because of the resulting distortion. He also experimented with a couple of Norlin Lab Series L5, which he found too clean. He also used and endorsed Pearce amps, which were designed by an engineer who worked on Gibson's Lab Series.

Other amps included Johnson amps, Mesa Boogie (Mark III, Boogie 295, Quad Preamp, or .50 Caliber) and a Carvin keyboard amp.

In his later career he transitioned to Hartley-Thompson amps, which in his opinion had a warm and clean sound. Guitarist Eddie Van Halen used Holdsworth's modified Hartley-Thompson amplifier to record his solo on the 1982 song "Beat It" by Michael Jackson.

Holdsworth could also be seen performing with Yamaha DG80 112 digital modelling amps that he used in pairs: one for his clean sound and the other had a 'crunch' preset with very little gain and a lot of master volume.

Holdsworth endorsed Hughes & Kettner amplifiers. He used the TriAmp MKII and the ZenTera together with a Yamaha DG130 Power amp. and Fender Twins.

== Personal life ==
Holdsworth lived in California from the early 1980s. Cycling was one of his favourite pastimes. He was also a keen beer aficionado, with a particular fondness for Northern English cask ale. He experimented with brewing his own beer in the 1990s, and invented a specialised beer pump named The Fizzbuster, which, in his own words, creates "a beautiful creamy head."

Around 1986, Holdsworth struggled financially and occasionally sold equipment to make ends meet.

Holdsworth became a grandfather in December 2010, when his daughter Louise gave birth to a girl.

Holdsworth died on 15 April 2017 at his home in Vista, California, at the age of 70. Initially no cause of death was officially disclosed; news media later reported that he died of heart disease.

== Discography ==
=== Solo albums ===
Studio

- 1976: Velvet Darkness
- 1982: I.O.U.
- 1983: Road Games (EP)
- 1985: Metal Fatigue
- 1986: Atavachron
- 1987: Sand
- 1989: Secrets
- 1992: Wardenclyffe Tower
- 1993: Hard Hat Area
- 1996: None Too Soon
- 2000: The Sixteen Men of Tain
- 2001: Flat Tire: Music for a Non-Existent Movie
- 2016: Tales from the Vault

Live

- 1997: I.O.U. Live
- 2002: Live at the Galaxy Theatre (DVD)
- 2002: All Night Wrong
- 2003: Then!
- 2018: Live in Japan 1984
- 2019: Warsaw Summer Jazz Days '98 (CD & DVD)
- 2020: Frankfurt '86 (CD & DVD)
- 2021: Leverkusen '97 (CD & DVD)
- 2021: Leverkusen 2010 (CD & DVD)
- 2022: Jarasum Jazz Festival 2014 (CD & DVD)

Collaborations

- 1980: Conversation Piece – Part 1 & 2, with Gordon Beck, Jeff Clyne and John Stevens
- 1990: Truth in Shredding, with Frank Gambale/The Mark Varney Project
- 1996: Heavy Machinery, with Jens Johansson and Anders Johansson
- 2008: Live at Yoshi's (DVD), with Alan Pasqua, and featuring Chad Wackerman and Jimmy Haslip (live concert video)
- 2009: Blues for Tony, with Alan Pasqua, and featuring Chad Wackerman and Jimmy Haslip (live double album)
- 2009: Propensity, with Danny Thompson and John Stevens (recorded 1978)

Compilations

- 2005: The Best of Allan Holdsworth: Against the Clock
- 2017: Eidolon: The Allan Holdsworth Collection
- 2017: The Man Who Changed Guitar Forever! The Allan Holdsworth Album Collection (box set)

=== With other artists ===
'Igginbottom

- 1969: 'Igginbottom's Wrench

Nucleus

- 1972: Belladonna (released as a solo album by Ian Carr)

Tempest

- 1973: Tempest
- 2005: Under the Blossom: The Anthology

Soft Machine
Studio:

- 1975: Bundles
- 1981: Land of Cockayne
- 2003: Abracadabra (as Soft Works)

Live:

- 2003: BBC Radio 1971–1974
- 2006: Floating World Live 1975
- 2015: Switzerland 1974 (CD, DVD)
- 2020: Abracadabra In Osaka (as Soft Works)

The New Tony Williams Lifetime

- 1975: Believe It
- 1976: Million Dollar Legs

Pierre Moerlen's Gong

- 1976: Gazeuse!
- 1978: Expresso II
- 1979: Time Is the Key

John Stevens

- 1977: Touching On
- 1977: Re-Touch

Jean-Luc Ponty

- 1977: Enigmatic Ocean
- 1983: Individual Choice
- 2007: The Atacama Experience

Bruford

- 1978: Feels Good to Me
- 1979: One of a Kind
- 1986: Master Strokes: 1978–1985 (compilation)
- 2006: Rock Goes to College (CD/DVD, live in 1979)

U.K.

- 1978: U.K.
- 1999: Concert Classics Volume 4 (live 1978; reissued variously as Live in America and Live in Boston)
- 2016: Ultimate Collector's Edition (box set)

Gordon Beck

- 1979: Sunbird
- 1980: The Things You See
- 1988: With a Heart in My Song

Jon St. James

- 1986: Fast Impressions (guest soloist on "Fast Impressions" & "Rainy Taxi")

Krokus

- 1986: Change of Address (guest soloist on "Long Way From Home")

Stanley Clarke

- 1988: If This Bass Could Only Talk (guest soloist on "Stories to Tell")

Stuart Hamm

- 1988: Radio Free Albemuth (SynthAxe solo on "Radio Free Albemuth")

Jack Bruce

- 1989: A Question of Time (guest soloist on "Obsession" & "Only Playing Games")

Alex Masi

- 1989: Attack of the Neon Shark (guest soloist on "Cold Sun")

Chad Wackerman

- 1991: Forty Reasons
- 1993: The View
- 2012: Dreams Nightmares and Improvisations

Level 42

- 1991: Guaranteed
- 2024: Live in London 1990, featuring Allan Holdsworth

Jeff Watson

- 1992: Lone Ranger (guest soloist on "Forest of Feeling")

Gorky Park

- 1996: Stare (guest soloist on "Don't Make Me Stay")

Steve Hunt

- 1997: From Your Heart and Your Soul

Steve Tavaglione

- 1997: Blue Tav

Derek Sherinian

- 2004: Mythology

K²

- 2005: Book of the Dead

Corrado Rustici

- 2006: Deconstruction of a Postmodern Musician (guest soloist on "Tantrum to Blind")

Planet X

- 2007: Quantum

Paul Korda

- 2009: Early Years (guest soloist on "Living in the Sky")

=== Videos ===
- 1992: REH Video: Allan Holdsworth (VHS, reissued on DVD in 2007)

=== Books ===
- 1987: Reaching for the Uncommon Chord. Hal Leonard Corporation. ISBN 978-0-634-07002-0.
- 1994: Just for the Curious. Warner Bros. ISBN 978-0-7692-2015-4.
- 1997: Melody Chords for Guitar. Centerstream Publications. ISBN 978-1-57424-051-1.

== Bibliography ==
- Mark Gilbert, « The Reluctant Guitarist », Jazz Journal, 1992.
- Bjørn Schille, Allan Holdsworth : reshaping harmony (Thesis), University of Oslo, Institute of Musicology, 2011.
- James Rosenberg, “I’d Rather Be Broke and Happy than Miserable and Rich” : The Life and Music of Allan Holdsworth (Thesis), University of Wesleyenne (Middletown), 2013.
