= Road Games (EP) =

EP by Allan Holdsworth
- Released: September 1983
- Studio: Music Grinder Studios, Los Angeles
- Genre: Jazz fusion
- Length: 24:11
- Label: Warner Bros.
- Producer: Allan Holdsworth, Ted Templeman

Allan Holdsworth chronology
I.O.U. (1982)	Road Games (1983)	Metal Fatigue (1985)

Alternative cover
- 2001 reissue

Road Games is an EP (or, according to its vinyl sleeve, a "specially-priced 6-cut mini album") by guitarist Allan Holdsworth, released in 1983 through Warner Bros. Records originally on vinyl only; a CD edition was reissued through Gnarly Geezer Records in 2001.

Holdsworth is joined on the album by former Cream vocalist Jack Bruce (who sings “Was There?” and “Material Real”), his former Bruford bandmate, bassist Jeff Berlin, and then current Frank Zappa drummer Chad Wackerman. Former Juicy Lucy and Tempest frontman Paul Williams sings the title track.

Holdsworth claimed to have received no royalties from either release, naming it as one of his least favourite recordings due to numerous creative differences with executive producer Ted Templeman. Road Games nonetheless received a nomination for Best Rock Instrumental Performance at the 1984 Grammy Awards.

== Critical reception ==
Professional ratings
Review scores
Source	Rating
AllMusic	4/5 stars

John W. Patterson at AllMusic awarded Road Games four stars out of five, describing it as "fusion-rock bliss" and Holdsworth's guitar work as "amazing". He also praised Chad Wackerman's "tastefully poised" drumming and Jeff Berlin's "killer" bass work.

== Track listing ==
All lyrics are written by Paul Williams; all music is composed by Allan Holdsworth.

No.	Title	Length
1.	"Three Sheets to the Wind"	4:14
2.	"Road Games"	4:14
3.	"Water on the Brain—Pt. II"	2:49
4.	"Tokyo Dream"	4:04
5.	"Was There?"	4:09
6.	"Material Real"	4:41
Total length:		24:11

== Personnel ==
- Allan Holdsworth – guitar, production
- Paul Williams – vocals (track 2)
- Jack Bruce – vocals (tracks 5, 6)
- Chad Wackerman – drums
- Jeff Berlin – bass
- Joe Turano – backing vocals
- Paul Korda – backing vocals

Technical

- Jeremy Smith – engineering
- Jeff Silver – engineering
- Gary Skardina – engineering
- Robert Feist – engineering, mixing
- Mark Linett – mixing
- John Matousek – mastering
- Joan Parker – production coordination
- Ted Templeman – executive production
- Tom Voli – executive production (reissue)
- Eddie Jobson – executive production (reissue)

== Awards ==
Title	Event	Award	Result
Road Games	1984 Grammys	Best Rock Instrumental Performance	Nominated
