= Sand (album) =

Studio album by Allan Holdsworth
- Released: August 1987
- Studio: Front Page Recorders, Costa Mesa, California
- Genre: Jazz fusion
- Length: 35:09
- Label: Relativity
- Producer: Allan Holdsworth

Allan Holdsworth chronology
Atavachron (1986)	Sand (1987)	With a Heart in My Song (1988)

Sand is the fifth studio album by guitarist Allan Holdsworth, released in August 1987 through Relativity Records (United States) and JMS–Cream Records (Europe).

== Critical reception ==
Professional ratings
Review scores
Source	Rating
AllMusic	4/5 stars

Thom Jurek of AllMusic awarded Sand four stars out of five, calling it one of Holdsworth's "most innovative and texturally beautiful" albums to date and highlighting his extensive use of the SynthAxe.

== Track listing ==
All music is composed by Allan Holdsworth, except where noted.

No.	Title	Length
1.	"Sand"	5:25
2.	"Distance vs. Desire"	5:16
3.	"Pud Wud"	6:45
4.	"Clown"	5:14
5.	"The 4.15 Bradford Executive" (Holdsworth, Chad Wackerman)	8:28
6.	"Mac Man"	4:01
Total length:		35:09

== Personnel ==
- Allan Holdsworth – guitar, SynthAxe, engineering, mixing, production
- Alan Pasqua – keyboard
- Gary Husband – drums (tracks 1, 3)
- Chad Wackerman – drums (tracks 4, 5), percussion (track 6)
- Jimmy Johnson – bass (except track 6)
- Biff Vincent – Roland Octapad bass (track 6)
- John England – sound effects

Technical

- Dan Humann – engineering, mixing
- Robert Feist – engineering, mixing
- Bernie Grundman – mastering
- Francois Bardol – cover art
