= Atavachron =

Studio album by Allan Holdsworth
- Released: 1986
- Studio: Front Page Recorders, Costa Mesa, California
- Genre: Jazz fusion
- Length: 36:52
- Label: Enigma
- Producer: Allan Holdsworth

Allan Holdsworth chronology
Metal Fatigue (1985)	Atavachron (1986)	Sand (1987)

Atavachron is the fourth studio album by guitarist Allan Holdsworth, released in 1986 through Enigma Records (United States) and JMS–Cream Records (Europe). It features Holdsworth's first recorded use of the SynthAxe, an instrument which would be featured prominently on his future albums. The album's title and seventh track, as well as the cover art, are references to the Atavachron alien time travel device from the Star Trek episode "All Our Yesterdays". "Funnels" refers to the three funnels of the RMS Queen Mary.

== Critical reception ==
Professional ratings
Review scores
Source	Rating
AllMusic	4/5 stars

John W. Patterson of AllMusic awarded Atavachron four stars out of five, describing it as "semi-progressive" with a "symphonic element" and praising it as "clear evidence of the genius Holdsworth was demonstrating release after release". He also highlighted the use of the SynthAxe, as well as praising the "beautiful female vocals" of Rowanne Mark, who makes her first of two appearances on a Holdsworth album; the other being Secrets (1989).

== Track listing ==
All tracks are written by Allan Holdsworth, except where noted

No.	Title	Length
1.	"Non Brewed Condiment"	3:41
2.	"Funnels"	6:15
3.	"The Dominant Plague"	5:45
4.	"Atavachron"	4:45
5.	"Looking Glass"	4:36
6.	"Mr. Berwell"	6:24
7.	"All Our Yesterdays" (lyrics: Rowanne Mark)	5:26
Total length:		36:52

== Personnel ==
- Allan Holdsworth – guitar, SynthAxe, engineering, mixing, production
- Rowanne Mark – vocals (track 7)
- William Edward Childs – keyboard (tracks 2, 5)
- Alan Pasqua – keyboard (tracks 3, 4, 6)
- Gary Husband – drums (tracks 1, 2, 4, 6)
- Chad Wackerman – drums (tracks 3, 7)
- Tony Williams – drums (track 5)
- Jimmy Johnson – bass

Technical

- Robert Feist – engineering, mixing
- Dan Humann – engineering, mixing
- Bernie Grundman – mastering
- Francois Bardol – cover art
