= Alan Pasqua =

American pianist

- Born: June 28, 1952 (age 74); New Jersey, U.S.
- Genres: Rock; hard rock; jazz; jazz fusion
- Occupations: Musician; composer
- Instruments: Keyboards; piano
- Years active: 1970s–present
- Labels: Postcards; Cryptogramophone; Moonjune; BFM Jazz; Fuzzy; Arkadia Records; Blue Canoe Records
- Formerly of: Giant

Alan Pasqua (born June 28, 1952) is an American rock and jazz pianist. He studied at Indiana University and the New England Conservatory of Music. His album Standards with drummer Peter Erskine was nominated for a Grammy Award in 2008. As a session musician, he has toured and recorded with Bob Dylan, Santana, Cher, Michael Bublé, Eddie Money, Allan Holdsworth, Joe Walsh, Pat Benatar, Rick Springfield, and John Fogerty. He co-composed the original CBS Evening News theme. He has also had an extensive career in pop and rock music, most notably as a founding member, keyboardist, and songwriter of the 1980s hard rock band Giant.

== Biography ==
Pasqua grew up in Roselle Park, New Jersey.

He joined The New Tony Williams Lifetime and appeared on the albums Believe It and Million Dollar Legs. He then went on to perform with Eddie Money's band, after which he then joined Bob Dylan's band. Pasqua recorded two albums with Dylan (Bob Dylan at Budokan and Street-Legal). In the 1980s he performed with John Fogerty on the album Eye of the Zombie, with Starship on the album No Protection, with Allan Holdsworth on the album Sand, and joined Carlos Santana as keyboardist on Marathon, Zebop! and Havana Moon.

Pasqua was married to actress Heather Langenkamp from 1984 until 1987.

He was a founding member of the late-1980s rock band Giant, and he co-wrote the band's biggest hit, "I'll See You in My Dreams."

In 2017 Pasqua provided the uncredited "background-y" piano accompaniment for Dylan's Nobel Prize for Literature recorded speech. He and Fiona Apple also played piano on Dylan's song Murder Most Foul, on his 2020 album Rough and Rowdy Ways.

== Discography ==
- Milagro (Postcards, 1994)
- Dedications (Postcards, 1995)
- Lee Ritenour – Alive in L.A. (GRP, 1997)
- Russian Peasant (Ro Writes Music, 1999)
- Live at Rocco (Fuzzy Music, 2000)
- The Music of Eric Von Essen, Vol. 1 (Cryptogramophone, 2000)
- The Music of Eric von Essen, Vol. 2 (Cryptogramophone, 2001)
- Badlands (Fuzzy Music, 2001)
- Body & Soul (Video Arts, 2004)
- My New Old Friend (Cryptogramophone, 2005)
- Solo (Alan Pasqua, 2007)
- Standards (Fuzzy, 2007)
- The Anti-Social Club (Cryptogramophone, 2007)
- Twin Bill: Two Piano Music of Bill Evans (BFM Jazz, 2011)
- The Interlochen Concert (Fuzzy, 2016)
- Northern Lights (Gretabelle, 2018)
- Soliloquy (Gretabelle, 2019)
- Day Dream (2020)
- Believe It (New Tony Williams Lifetime 1975)
- Proto-Cosmos (Blue Canoe Records, 2022)
- Short Cuts (from Ellingtonia) (Arkadia Records, 2024)
- New Hope (Blue Canoe Records, 2025)

=== As co-leader ===
- Blues for Tony with Allan Holdsworth, Jimmy Haslip and Chad Wackerman (Moonjune, 2009)
- Standards 2: Movie Music with Peter Erskine, Bob Mintzer, Darek Oles (Fuzzy Music, 2010)
- The Interlochen Concert with Peter Erskine, Darek Oles (Fuzzy Music, 2010) – live
- 3 Nights in L.A. with George Garzone, Peter Erskine and Darek Oles (Fuzzy Music, 2019)
