= SynthAxe =

Electronic music instrument that emulates the layout of a guitar

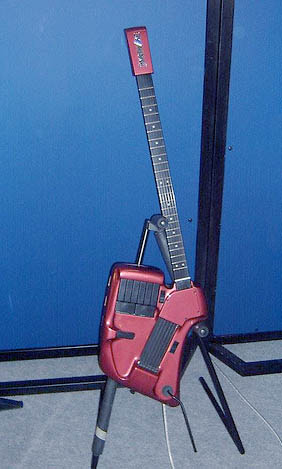
The SynthAxe

The SynthAxe is a fretted, guitar-like MIDI controller, created by Bill Aitken, Mike Dixon, and Tony Sedivy and manufactured in England in 1985. It is a musical instrument that uses electronic synthesizers to produce sound and is controlled through the use of an arm resembling the neck of a guitar in form and in use. Its name comes from the words synthesizer and axe, a slang term meaning a guitar in rock music. The system was developed as a joint venture funded by Richard Branson's Virgin Group.

The SynthAxe itself has no internal sound source; it is purely a controller and needs synthesizers to produce sound. The neck of the instrument is angled upwards from the body, and there are two independent sets of strings.

The fretboard is continuously scanned and sends signals to synthesizers which produce the sound. The left set determine the pitch played, through contact with the frets on the neck and by sensing the side-to-side bending of the string. The right set of strings are velocity sensitive; these strings can be plucked, strummed or damped in the same manner as a guitar. A keyboard made up of nine keys can also be used to trigger notes instead of the strings. Design of the key toggles was done by the late David Fowler, at the time trading under BJ Hopkins Injection and toolmaking, in Littleworth, Oxford.

An electronic tremolo bar (the 'electronic wang arm') can be used for standard whammy bar effects, or can be redefined to produce different MIDI output such as filter cutoffs or volume.

When originally produced, the SynthAxe was priced at £10,000 (approximately $13,000) and eventually sold for about £6,000. The instrument was built from aerospace and military grade hardware, and was such a sophisticated and expensive piece of machinery that few were sold, making it difficult to keep the company afloat. In or around 1986, Virgin Games took over the distribution but let it go after a couple of years.

Fewer than 100 SynthAxes were made, and it is difficult to locate used units. Most musicians who desire a MIDI guitar controller often use other alternatives, such as Roland or Axon systems that can convert a guitar's output to MIDI via 13-pin cables and outboard devices or older systems such as the Roland GR-500.

== Notable users ==
Prominent players of the SynthAxe included Allan Holdsworth, who used it extensively on his albums Atavachron (1986), Sand (1987) and Flat Tire: Music for a Non-Existent Movie (2001); Chuck Hammer, who worked with both Lou Reed and David Bowie, and was the earliest guitarist to use the SynthAxe in the United States; and Lee Ritenour, who used the SynthAxe on his album Earth Run (1986), the cover of which features the instrument. Saga bassist Jim Crichton also prominently used the SynthAxe on the album Wildest Dreams in place of a traditional bass guitar.

In the music video for "Out in the Fields" by Gary Moore and Phil Lynott, Moore is briefly shown playing a SynthAxe Christopher Currell used a SynthAxe to control the Synclavier on Michael Jackson's Bad tour. Béla Fleck and the Flecktones drummer Future Man uses a highly modified SynthAxe, known as the "Drumitar", that he purchased in its original form from Ritenour.
