= Gordon Beck =

English jazz pianist and composer (1935–2011)

- Born: 16 September 1935; Brixton, London, England
- Died: 6 November 2011 (aged 76); Ely, Cambridgeshire, England
- Genres: Jazz
- Occupation(s): Musician, composer
- Instrument: Piano
- Years active: 1960–mid-2000s
- Formerly of: Gordon Beck Quartet

Gordon James Beck (16 September 1935 – 6 November 2011) was an English jazz pianist and composer. At the time of his death, 26 albums had been released under his name.

== Early life ==
Beck was born in Brixton, London, and attended Pinner County Grammar School – the school Reg Dwight (Elton John) and Simon Le Bon later attended. He had a sister, Judy. He studied piano in his youth, but decided to pursue a career as an engineering technical draughtsman and moved to Canada in 1957 for this reason.

== Career ==
Largely self-taught, he returned to music after returning from Canada in 1958, where he had been exposed to the works of George Shearing and Dave Brubeck.

Beck became a professional musician in 1960. That year, he played with saxophonist Don Byas in Monte Carlo. Beck joined the Tubby Hayes group in 1962 back in England. He led his own bands from 1965, including Gyroscope, from 1968, a trio with bassist Jeff Clyne and drummer Tony Oxley.

In 1967, the Gordon Beck Quartet recorded the album Experiments with Pops which was released on Major Minor MMLP 21 in 1968. The sessions were recorded at London's Lansdowne Studios in August the previous year. In the spring of 1968, the Gordon Beck Quartet recorded some songs with Joy Marshall. Thirteen of the tracks with Marshall would appear on an album, When Sunny Gets Blue (Spring '68 Sessions) decades later.

Beck first played with vocalist Helen Merrill in 1969 and continued the relationship into the 1990s when she toured Europe. From 1969 to 1972 he toured with saxophonist Phil Woods's European Rhythm Machine. Beck recorded ten albums with Woods.

In the 1960s and 1970s he was a house pianist at Ronnie Scott's Jazz Club. Beck also played "experimental funk in the Swiss musician George Gruntz's six-keyboard group Piano Conclave (1973-75), and free jazz with [...] British improv drummer John Stevens (1977, 1982)." Beck was a member of Nucleus between 1973 and 1974.

=== Later period ===
From middle age, Beck played predominantly in mainland Europe. He also recorded albums with Allan Holdsworth, Henri Texier, Didier Lockwood and others. He often played solo from the 1980s and started teaching music at the same point. He toured Japan with Holdsworth in 1985. Beck stopped performing around 2005 because of poor health. He died in Ely, Cambridgeshire, on 6 November 2011.

== Playing style ==
Describing Beck, in his obituary for The Guardian, jazz critic John Fordham said: "He hardly ever played a cliche; he struck notes with a steely precision or a glistening delicacy depending on the mood, and his solos developed in constantly changing phrase lengths and rhythms that never sounded glib or routine."
