= Lifetime: The Collection =

Compilation album by The New Tony Williams Lifetime
- Released: 1992
- Recorded: July 1975 & June 1976
- Genre: Jazz Fusion
- Length: 76:22
- Label: Columbia/Legacy
- Producer: Bruce Botnick

The New Tony Williams Lifetime chronology
Million Dollar Legs (1975)	Lifetime: The Collection (1992)

Professional ratings
Review scores
Source	Rating
Allmusic	4.5/5 stars

Lifetime: The Collection is a compilation album by the New Tony Williams Lifetime, released in 1992 on Columbia/Legacy Records. The album contains all of the music from the two original New Lifetime albums Believe It (1975) and Million Dollar Legs (1976).

== Reception ==
Allmusic awarded the album with 4.5 stars and its review by Scott Yanow states: "Although not flawless (some of the music has dated), these long-overlooked performances are worth exploring by fusion collectors, especially for Holdsworth's fiery yet thoughtful solos".

== Track listing ==
1. "Snake Oil" (Tony Newton) — 6:30
2. "Fred" (Allan Holdsworth) — 6:48
3. "Proto-Cosmos" (Alan Pasqua) — 4:02
4. "Red Alert" (Newton) — 4:39
5. "Wildlife" (Tony Williams) — 5:22
6. "Mr Spock" (Holdsworth) — 6:15
7. "Sweet Revenge" (Williams) — 6:03
8. "You Did It to Me Baby" (Williams, Al Cleveland) — 3:45
9. "Million Dollar Legs" (Williams) — 6:38
10. "Joy Filled Summer" (Newton) — 5:50
11. "Lady Jane" (Pasqua) — 3:56
12. "What You Do to Me" (Williams) — 6:38
13. "Inspirations of Love" (Newton) — 9:48

== Personnel ==
- Allan Holdsworth – guitar
- Alan Pasqua – keyboards
- Tony Newton – bass, vocals
- Tony Williams – drums
