= The Joy of Flying =

Studio album by Tony Williams
- Released: 1978
- Genre: Jazz fusion
- Length: 49:37
- Label: Columbia
- Producer: Tony Williams

The Joy of Flying is a jazz fusion album by Tony Williams. It was recorded at the end of the Tony Williams Lifetime years, and is considered his first solo album since 1966. It included three duets, two with Mahavishnu Orchestra keyboardist Jan Hammer, and one with free jazz pianist Cecil Taylor, and three different quartets: the first featured Hammer along with guitarist George Benson and bassist Paul Jackson, the second featured pianist Herbie Hancock, bassist Stanley Clarke and Tom Scott on Lyricon, and the third featured guitarist Ronnie Montrose, keyboardist Brian Auger, and bass guitarist Mario Cipollina. "Hip Skip" also featured a five-piece horn section.

The third quartet mentioned above performed a single concert on July 27, 1978, at Japan's Denen Coliseum (billed as "The Tony Williams All Stars"), which was recorded. Along with "Open Fire," their set list included "Rocky Road" and "Heads Up" by Montrose, "Red Alert", "Wildlife" and "There Comes a Time" by Williams, "Dragon Song" by John McLaughlin, and "Tropic of Capricorn" and a dual drum solo (with special guest drummer Billy Cobham).

== Critical reception ==
Professional ratings
Review scores
Source	Rating
AllMusic	4/5 stars
Christgau's Record Guide	B−
DownBeat	4/5 stars
The Rolling Stone Jazz Record Guide	2/5 stars

The Bay State Banner wrote that Williams "presents polarities of rock and R&B, contrasting styles of music woven into an electric tapestry of shifting, pulsating, surging hues and moods." DownBeat gave the release 4 stars. Reviewer Bob Henschen wrote, "Williams is best when he sticks his neck out, in one direction or another, and just lets all that rhythm come to a boil."

== Track listing ==
1. "Going Far" (Jan Hammer) - 4:13
2. "Hip Skip" (George Benson) - 8:03
3. "Hittin' on 6" (Tom Scott) - 6:16
4. "Open Fire" (Ronnie Montrose, Edgar Winter) - 6:16
5. "Tony" (Stanley Clarke) - 6:50
6. "Eris" (Hammer) - 3:33
7. "Coming Back Home" (Hammer) - 6:06
8. "Morgan's Motion" (Cecil Taylor) - 8:18

== Personnel ==
(adapted from the original LP notes)

- Tony Williams - drums & percussion (all tracks)
- Jan Hammer (tracks 1, 2, 6 & 7), Herbie Hancock (tracks 3 & 5), Brian Auger (track 4) - keyboards & synthesizer
- George Benson (tracks 2 & 7), Ronnie Montrose (track 4) - electric guitar
- Tom Scott - Lyricon (tracks 3 & 5)
- Cecil Taylor - acoustic piano (track 8)
- Ralph MacDonald - percussion (track 2)
- Paul Jackson (tracks 2 & 7), Stanley Clarke (tracks 3 & 5), Mario Cipollina (track 4) - electric bass

Horn Section (track 2):

- David Sanborn - alto saxophone
- Michael Brecker - tenor saxophone
- Ronnie Cuber - baritone saxophone
- Jon Faddis & Randy Brecker - trumpets
- Barry Rogers - trombone

Production

Produced by Tony Williams

Recording engineers: Jan Hammer (tracks 1 & 6); Don Puluse (tracks 2 & 7); Fred Catero (tracks 3 & 5); Tom Suzuki (track 4); Stan Tonkel (track 8)

== Sources ==
- Tony Williams; Joy of Flying liner notes; Columbia Records 1978
