= Herbie Hancock Trio =

Herbie Hancock Trio may refer to:

- Herbie Hancock Trio (1977 album)
- Herbie Hancock Trio (1982 album)
- Herbie Hancock Trio, an accompaniment group for Herbie Hancock
