= Quartet (Herbie Hancock album) =

Studio album by Herbie Hancock
- Released: January 5, 1983
- Recorded: July 28, 1981
- Studios: CBS/Sony Studios, Shinanomachi, Tokyo
- Genre: Jazz
- Length: 68:25
- Label: CBS/Sony
- Producers: David Rubinson & Friends, Herbie Hancock

Herbie Hancock chronology
Herbie Hancock Trio (1982)	Quartet (1983)	Lite Me Up (1982)

Quartet is the twenty-seventh album by jazz pianist Herbie Hancock, featuring a quartet with trumpeter Wynton Marsalis, bassist Ron Carter and drummer Tony Williams. It was originally issued in Japan on CBS/Sony, and later given a US release by Columbia.

== Overview ==
Hancock recorded the album while touring Japan with the V.S.O.P. rhythm section (Ron Carter and Tony Williams) and trumpeter Wynton Marsalis. Marsalis was filling in on the tour for V.S.O.P. members Freddie Hubbard and Wayne Shorter.

Some of the songs were from the 1965–1968 Miles Davis quintet, while one was from Hancock's own repertoire. The first two tracks on the album "Well You Needn't" and "'Round Midnight" are developed from two jazz standards by Thelonious Monk. The last track, "I Fall in Love Too Easily", develops from a 1945 Jule Styne and Sammy Cahn song.

During the same week of recording sessions that produced Quartet, Hancock recorded his 1981 Trio album. Hancock, Carter, and Williams also recorded four tracks with Wynton Marsalis and his brother, saxophonist Branford Marsalis, during this week. The tracks featuring Marsalis as leader were included on the trumpeter's 1982 debut album.

== Reception ==
Professional ratings
Review scores
Source	Rating
AllMusic	4/5 stars
The Penguin Guide to Jazz	3/4 stars

The Penguin Guide to Jazz commented that Hancock's playing standard was not as good as earlier in his career, but concluded that, "Fortunately for the album, Marsalis is feeling his oats, dispatching his solos with testy arrogance, and of course the other two rhythm players are in superb shape." The AllMusic reviewer highlighted Marsalis's contribution, writing that "This is an extremely symbolic album, for Herbie Hancock and the V.S.O.P. rhythm section essentially pass the torch of the '80s acoustic jazz revival to the younger generation, as personified by then 19-year-old Wynton Marsalis."

== Track listing ==
No.	Title	Songwriter(s)	Length
1.	"Well You Needn't"	Thelonious Monk	6:29
2.	"'Round Midnight"	Bernie Hanighen, Cootie Williams, Thelonious Monk	6:41
3.	"Clear Ways"	Tony Williams	5:00
4.	"A Quick Sketch"	Ron Carter	16:27
5.	"The Eye of the Hurricane"	Herbie Hancock	8:05
6.	"Parade"	Ron Carter	7:58
7.	"The Sorcerer"	Herbie Hancock	7:19
8.	"Pee Wee"	Tony Williams	4:34
9.	"I Fall In Love Too Easily"	Jule Styne, Sammy Cahn	5:52
Total length:			68:25

== Personnel ==
Musicians

- Herbie Hancock - piano
- Wynton Marsalis - trumpet
- Ron Carter - bass
- Tony Williams - drums

Production

- David Rubinson & Friends Inc., Herbie Hancock
- Tomoo Suzuki - Recording engineer
