= Million Dollar Legs =

Million Dollar Legs may refer to:

- Million Dollar Legs (1932 film), starring W. C. Fields
- Million Dollar Legs (1939 film), featuring Betty Grable
- Million Dollar Legs (album), the second album by The New Tony Williams Lifetime
