= V.S.O.P. Live Under the Sky =

Live Under the Sky

Live album by The V.S.O.P. Quintet
- Released: 1979 (in Japan), 2004 (rest of World)
- Recorded: July 26–27, 1979
- Venue: Denen Coliseum, Tokyo, Japan
- Genre: Jazz
- Label: CBS/Sony, Columbia
- Producer: David Rubinson

The V.S.O.P. Quintet chronology
Tempest in the Colosseum (1977)	Live Under the Sky (1979)	Live Under the Sky, No. 2 (2002)

Professional ratings
Review scores
Source	Rating
Allmusic	4.5/5 stars
All About Jazz	(not rated)
The Rolling Stone Jazz Record Guide	4/5 stars
Tom Hull	B+

V.S.O.P : Live Under the Sky is a 1979 live album by the V.S.O.P. Quintet, a record of a performance at the 1979 Live Under the Sky Festival as it was performed live in Japan over two days. The first day, which took place during a furious rainstorm, was broadcast live on national television. The original release featured the first day, while the 2004 re-master/re-release (fully for the first time in the United States) also featured the second concert. This, the fourth VSOP release, once again featured pianist Herbie Hancock, saxophonist Wayne Shorter, drummer Tony Williams, bassist Ron Carter and trumpeter Freddie Hubbard.

== Background ==
The songs in this concert feature a song from Hancock's usual set of "Eye of The Hurricane" and also an original for the concert "Domo", Carter's contributions of "Tear Drop" and "Fragile", Williams' "Para Oriente" and "Pee Wee" and Hubbard's "One of Another Kind". Shorter and Hancock came out during the second concert, for an encore performance of classic jazz standards "Stella by Starlight" and "On Green Dolphin Street". The band, already exhausted after the second concert did not want to come out for an encore, so Hancock and Shorter came out by themselves and played.

== Notes ==
"Stella by Starlight" and "On Green Dolphin Street" appears as one continuous song on the Herbie Hancock Box set released in 2002, which became the first time that any song from the concert was released publicly in North America. The album was released for the first time in the United States in 2004.

== Track listing ==
Disc 1 - July 26, 1979

1. "Opening" - 0:46
2. "Eye of the Hurricane" (Hancock) - 7:48
3. "Tear Drop" (Carter) - 10:34
4. "Domo" (Hancock) - 12:35
5. "Para Oriente" (Williams) - 7:28
6. "Pee Wee" (Williams) - 8:12
7. "One of Another Kind" (Hubbard) - 20:48
8. "Fragile" (Carter) - 9:40

Disc 2 - July 27, 1979

1. "Opening" - 0:23
2. "Eye of the Hurricane" (Hancock) - 11:25
3. "Tear Drop" (Carter) - 9:13
4. "Domo" (Hancock) - 11:41
5. "Para Oriente" (Williams) - 6:51
6. "Pee Wee" (Williams) - 6:27
7. "One of Another Kind" (Hubbard) - 14:45
8. "Fragile" (Carter) - 8:32
9. "Stella by Starlight" (Ned Washington, Victor Young) - 4:45
10. "On Green Dolphin Street" (Bronislaw Kaper, Ned Washington) - 2:17

== Personnel ==
Musicians

- Herbie Hancock – piano
- Freddie Hubbard – trumpet
- Wayne Shorter – tenor saxophone, soprano saxophone
- Ron Carter – double bass
- Tony Williams – drums

Production

- David Rubinson – producer, engineer (mixing)
- Tomoo Suzuki – engineer (recording)
- Brian Bell – engineer (live mixing)
- Kaoru Hirono – engineer (duplication)
- Ken Ohshiro – assistant engineer
- Mikio Takamatsu – assistant engineer
- S.C.I. Yamaguchi Group – assistant engineer
- Hirosaki Kanai – executive production coordinator
- Atsuya Sano – production coordinator
- Keiichi Nakamura – production coordinator
- Namihiko Sasaki – production coordinator
- Yasohachi Itoh – production coordinator
- Akio Nimbari – art direction, design
- Junichi Nakamura – design
- Rumi Tanaka – artwork
- Tadayuki Naitoh – photography
- Shoichi Yui – liner notes
