= Turn It Over =

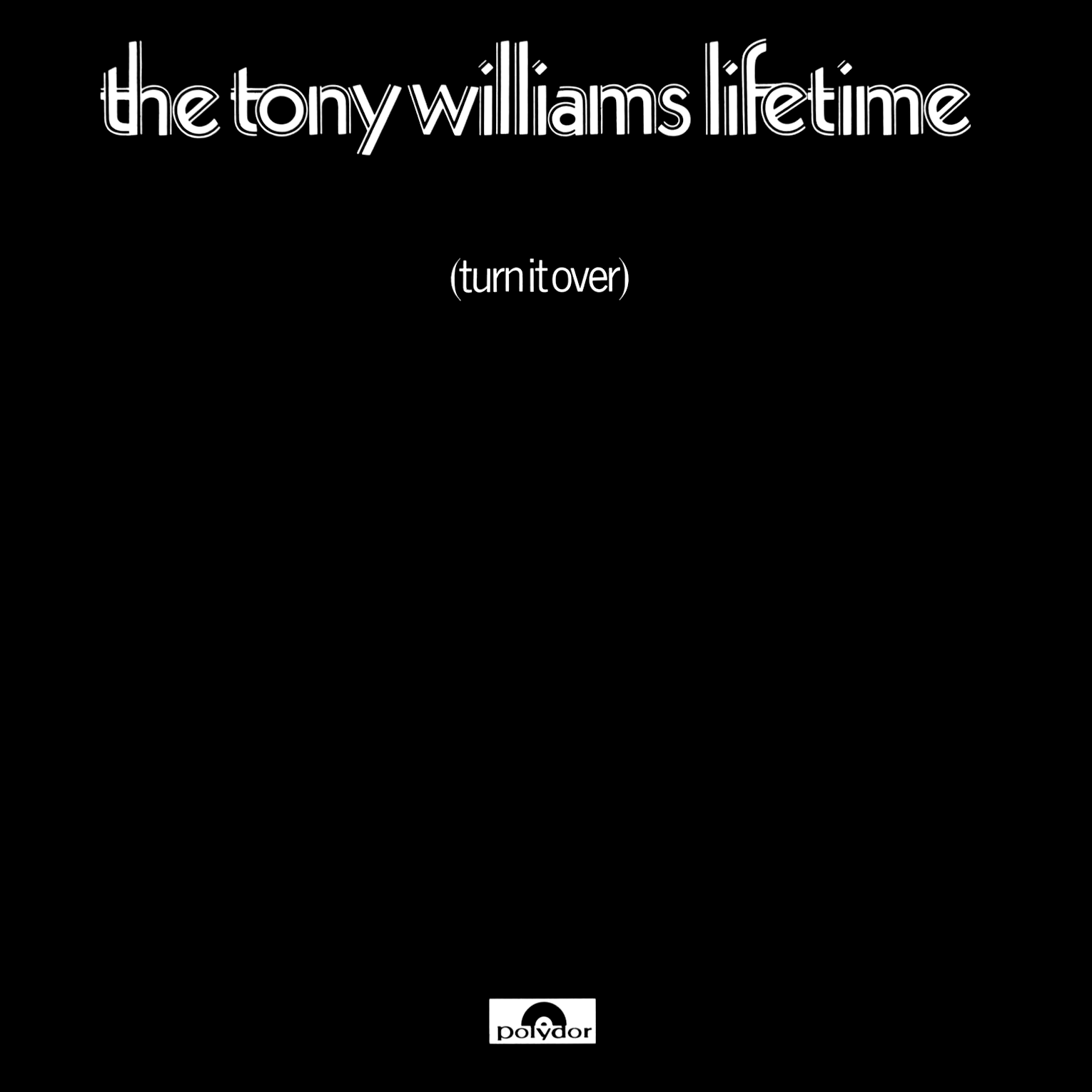

Studio album by the Tony Williams Lifetime
- Released: December 1970
- Recorded: July 1970
- Studios: Olmsteads, New York City
- Genres: Jazz fusion, jazz-rock
- Length: 34:50; 38:36 (reissue)
- Label: Polydor
- Producers: Monte Kay, Jack Lewis, Tony Williams

The Tony Williams Lifetime chronology
Emergency! (1969)	Turn It Over (1970)	Ego (1971)

Turn It Over is the second album by the American jazz fusion group the Tony Williams Lifetime, released in 1970 via Polydor Records. It was rereleased by Verve Records in 1997, as part of Spectrum: The Anthology. Williams is again joined by guitarist John McLaughlin and organist Larry Young, along with former Cream member Jack Bruce on bass guitar.

== Production ==
Jack Bruce joined the group for Turn It Over, providing bass and vocals. Tony Williams was excited by the amplification he could employ during the recording of the album; his liner notes repeatedly instruct the listener to play the album at a high volume. Williams described the album as his version of the MC5's Kick Out the Jams. "Big Nick" is a version of the John Coltrane composition.

== Critical reception ==
Professional ratings
Review scores
Source	Rating
AllMusic	4/5 stars
Robert Christgau	B+
The Encyclopedia of Popular Music	3/5 stars
The Penguin Guide to Jazz on CD	3.5/4 stars
The Rolling Stone Album Guide	3.5/5 stars

The Omaha World-Herald wrote that the Lifetime "is likely the most forceful group on the pop music scene." AllMusic called the album "one of the more intense pieces of early jazz-rock fusion around," writing that "in parts, it's like Jimi Hendrix's Band of Gypsys with much better chops." JazzTimes praised Larry Young's "fearsome long tones and wobbly distortions" and "psychedelic, dissonant harmonies." Vibe deemed Turn It Over "one of the most violent, raucous recordings ever to issue from a noted jazz musician." The Guardian called it "tougher" than the debut, singling out the performance of "Big Nick".

== Track listing ==
No.	Title	Writer(s)	Length
1.	"To Whom It May Concern – Them"	Chick Corea	4:18
2.	"To Whom It May Concern – Us"	Corea	2:58
3.	"This Night This Song"	Tony Williams	3:45
4.	"Big Nick"	John Coltrane	2:43
5.	"Right On"	Williams	1:52
6.	""Once I Loved""	Antônio Carlos Jobim, Vinicius de Moraes, Ray Gilbert	5:05
7.	"Vuelta Abajo"	Williams	4:57
8.	"A Famous Blues"	John McLaughlin	4:15
9.	"Allah Be Praised"	Larry Young	4:39

Reissue bonus track
No.	Title	Writer(s)	Length
10.	"One Word" (originally released as a UK single, 1970)	McLaughlin	3:45
Total length:			38:36

== Personnel ==
- Tony Williams – drums, vocals on "This Night This Song", "Once I Loved", "A Famous Blues"
- John McLaughlin – guitar, vocals on "A Famous Blues"
- Larry Young – organ
- Jack Bruce – bass, lead vocals on "One Word"
