= The Last Wave (album) =

1996 debut album by jazz fusion band Arcana

Studio album by Arcana
- Released: July 23, 1996
- Recorded: April 1995 at Greenpoint Studio, Brooklyn, New York
- Genre: Jazz fusion, free jazz
- Length: 60:23
- Label: DIW
- Producer: Bill Laswell, John Zorn, Kazunori Sugiyama

Arcana chronology
The Last Wave (1996)	Arc of the Testimony (1997)

The Last Wave is the debut album by American jazz fusion band Arcana, released on July 23, 1996. This first album is largely improvised, and features the trio of English free jazz guitarist Derek Bailey, bass guitarist Bill Laswell and drummer Tony Williams.

== Reception ==
Professional ratings
Review scores
Source	Rating
AllMusic	4/5 stars
The Penguin Guide to Jazz Recordings	4/4 stars

Brian Olewnick, writing for AllMusic, called "Broken Circle" "an astonishingly powerful piece of music," and commented: "Bailey... has his own utterly idiosyncratic approach to guitar playing and he rarely, if ever, adjusts that approach to the situation at hand. While Laswell and Williams lay down overwhelmingly strong and throbbing rhythmic grooves, Bailey soars, skronks and screams above, providing enormous and exhilarating tension. This is freely improvised rock at its finest." He concluded: "Bailey is consistently imaginative, coaxing undreamt of sounds from his guitar and providing the necessary creative fuel for this generally very successful session. In fact, listeners who have been cowed by Bailey's 'difficult' reputation could do worse than starting here."

The authors of The Penguin Guide to Jazz Recordings stated that the group "packed interstellar power", and wrote: "The prospect of Bailey... recording with the most creative and open-minded drummer of his generation... was irresistable. The results were well up to expectation, clangorous, dark-toned music from territory out beyond either jazz or rock, or any conceivable industry hybrid."

In a review for JazzTimes, Duck Baker stated: "The result is raucous, unique music that sounds like it's presented in the order recorded, and one hears, or imagines to hear, the musicians getting a handle on things as they progress... an extraordinarily successful set, one of Derek's best, but really a significant group improvisation."

== Track listing ==
All music is composed by Derek Bailey, Bill Laswell and Tony Williams.

No.	Title	Length
1.	"Broken Circle"	11:04
2.	"Cold Blast"	8:17
3.	"The Rattle of Bones"	7:57
4.	"Pearls and Transformation"	16:27
5.	"Tears of Astral Rain"	8:06
6.	"Transplant Wasteland"	8:32
Total length:		60:23

== Personnel ==
Musicians

- Derek Bailey – guitar
- Bill Laswell – bass guitar
- Tony Williams – drums

Production

- Bill Laswell – producer
- John Zorn – assistant producer
- Kazunori Sugiyama – assistant producer
- Robert Musso – engineer
- Allan Tucker – engineer (mastering)
- Layng Martine, Jr. – assistant engineer
- Arai Yasunori – design
