= Angels' Alley (disambiguation) =

Angels' Alley is a 1948 American comedy film directed by William Beaudine.

Angels' Alley, Angel's Alley, or Angels' Ally may also refer to:

- Angel Alley, a location associated with the Marshalsea prison (1373–1842), Southwark, England
- Angel Alley, the location of the Advisory Service for Squatters, London
- Angel Alley, a 1973 LP by a post-Mandrake Memorial trio Anomaly

== See also ==
- The Ballad of Angel's Alley
- Angel Street (disambiguation)
