= Tempest in the Colosseum =

Live album by V.S.O.P.
- Released: 1977
- Recorded: July 23, 1977
- Venue: Denen Coliseum, Ōta, Tokyo, Japan
- Genre: Jazz
- Length: 68:50
- Label: CBS/Sony
- Producer: Henri Renaud, David Rubinson

V.S.O.P. chronology
The Quintet (1977)	Tempest in the Colosseum (1977)	V.S.O.P. Live Under the Sky (1979)

Tempest in the Colosseum was recorded on July 23, 1977 in the Denen Coliseum in Tokyo, Japan. Musicians for this performance were Herbie Hancock on keyboards, Freddie Hubbard on trumpet, Tony Williams on drums, Ron Carter on double bass, and Wayne Shorter on tenor and soprano saxophones. The album was released in late 1977 only in Japan by CBS/Sony.

== Reception ==
The Allmusic review by Richard S. Ginell awarded the album 4 stars stating "Tempest is a good description, for this CD contains more volatile ensemble playing than its Columbia predecessor; clearly some tighter bonding took place since the trans-Pacific flight".

Professional ratings
Review scores
Source	Rating
Allmusic	4/5 stars

== Track listing ==
1. "Eye of the Hurricane" (Hancock) - 16:38
2. "Diana" (Shorter) - 4:31
3. "Eighty-One" (Carter) - 13:08
4. "Maiden Voyage" (Hancock) - 11:55
5. "Lawra" (Williams) - 8:23
6. "Red Clay" (Hubbard) - 14:15

== Personnel ==
- Herbie Hancock – keyboards, piano, synthesizer, vocals
- Ron Carter – bass
- Freddie Hubbard – trumpet
- Wayne Shorter – soprano saxophone, tenor saxophone
- Tony Williams – drums
