= Tony Newton (American musician) =

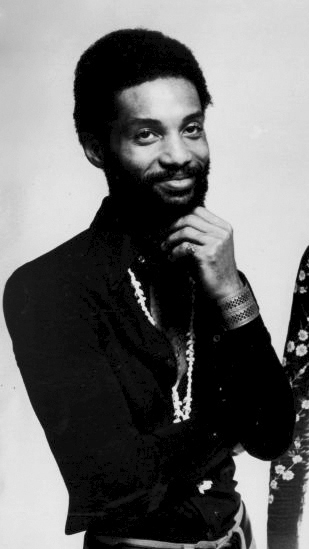

Background information
- Born: Antonio Lloyd Newton; 1948 (age 76–77)
- Origin: Detroit, Michigan, US
- Genres: Rock, soul, R&B, jazz rock
- Occupation(s): Musician, record producer, arranger
- Instrument(s): Bass, keyboards, vocals
- Years active: 1961–present
- Labels: NCI Records, Novaphonic Records
- Website: tonynewtonmusic.com

Antonio Lloyd "Tony" Newton (born 1948) is an electric bass player from Detroit, Michigan. Newton recorded and toured with The Jackson 5, Marvin Gaye, Aretha Franklin, The Temptations, Diana Ross, Tony Williams, John Lee Hooker, Smokey Robinson, Stevie Wonder, Michael Jackson, Joachim Kühn, Gary Moore, Allan Holdsworth and others.

Newton began his career first on piano at age seven, beginning professionally at the age of thirteen, playing bass guitar with blues legends John Lee Hooker, T-Bone Walker and Little Walter.

Newton was discovered by Motown executive Hank Cosby while playing in Detroit blues clubs at the age of 18. At Motown, James Jamerson taught Newton the ins and outs of his own bass playing style, so that Newton could travel with the Motortown Revue while Jamerson remained in Detroit for recording. The Motortown Revue toured the UK in 1965, in which Newton performed with artists such as The Supremes and Smokey Robinson.

== Discography ==
=== As leader/co-leader ===
- Mysticism and Romance (1978)
- Let's Be Generous (1991) with Joachim Kühn, Miroslav Tadić and Mark Nauseef
- Oracle (Solo piano, 1992)
- Circle of Love (1998)
- ThunderFunkFusion (2012)

With Smokey Robinson

- Smokey Robinson & the Miracles LIVE! (1969)

With The Mamas & the Papas

- People Like Us (1971)

With 8th Day

- I Gotta Get Home (Can't Let My Baby Get Lonely) (1973)

With Aretha Franklin

- You (1975)

With The Tony Williams New Lifetime

- Believe It (1975)
- Million Dollar Legs (1976)

With Joachim Kühn

- Joachim Kühn Band featuring Jan Akkerman & Ray Gomez – Sunshower (1978)
- J. Kühn Band – Don't Stop Me Now (1979)
- Joachim Kühn / Mark Nauseef / Tony Newton / Miroslav Tadic – Let's Be Generous (1991)

With G-Force / (Gary Moore)

- G-Force (1980)
