= Emergency! (album) =

Studio album by the Tony Williams Lifetime
- Released: September 1969
- Recorded: May 26 & 28, 1969
- Genres: Jazz fusion, jazz-rock
- Length: 70:24
- Labels: Verve, Polydor, PolyGram
- Producers: Monte Kay, Jack Lewis

Tony Williams chronology
Spring (1965)	Emergency! (1969)	Turn It Over (1970)

Emergency! is the debut double album by the American jazz fusion group the Tony Williams Lifetime featuring Williams with guitarist John McLaughlin and organist Larry Young. It was recorded and released in 1969 and was one of the first significant fusion recordings. The album is commonly regarded as an influential album in the jazz, rock, and fusion genres.

== Composition ==
According to jazz scholar Christopher Meeder, the Lifetime eschewed the funk influence of Miles Davis' early fusion music with a mixture of heavy rock drumming and the "light, rapid swing" that was Williams' signature. "Emergency! synthesized the best elements of free jazz, modal jazz, and British rock", Meeder wrote, "and added a rhythmic complexity in tracks like 'Via the Spectrum Road,' a blues of sorts in the unusual time signature of 11/8." In Paul Hegarty's opinion, the music was more oriented with progressive music's rock side rather than its jazz, fusing psychedelic elements while featuring "reprises, crescendos, an oscillation between the simpler time signatures of rock and the more progressive metres of jazz". He cited "Via the Spectrum Road" as an example of how Williams' singing approached the "non-rock, non-jazz softness" of progressive rock pioneer Robert Wyatt.

"Via the Spectrum Road" was viewed by Stuart Nicholson as one of the album's most blatant explorations of rock rhythms. "Spectrum", on the other hand, utilized rhythms from post-bop. Composed by McLaughlin, it was first recorded for his 1969 Extrapolation debut and was regarded by Nicholson as an extension of that album's "free-flowing approach ... but reinforced by the volume and energy associated with rock".

A mistake during Emergency's production led Meeder to believe it helped lend a "raw power" to the music: "A cynical engineer used to recording mainstream jazz recorded the band carelessly, allowing the tape to distort, unintentionally adding satisfyingly raw edges to the album."

== Release and reception ==
Professional ratings
Review scores
Source	Rating
AllMusic	5/5 stars
Chicago Tribune	4/4 stars
The Penguin Guide to Jazz	3.5/4 stars
Pitchfork	9.0/10
Record Collector	5/5 stars
The Rolling Stone Album Guide	4.5/5 stars
Sputnikmusic	5/5
The Village Voice	A

Emergency! was originally released in 1969 by Polydor/PolyGram Records, receiving widespread acclaim from major American publications. In a contemporary review for The Village Voice, Robert Christgau hailed Williams as "probably the best drummer in the world" and was astonished by the album, calling it "a frank extrapolation on the most raucous qualities of new thing jazz and wah-wah mannerist rock". Coda was less enthusiastic, finding it "intriguing" with some "substantial" pieces of music but not as much as other hard rock bands attempting the same kind of music, nor as imaginative and coherent as the music Williams, McLaughlin, and Young had made outside the group. The album was later issued on CD by Polydor/PolyGram Records in 1991 but with a "restoration" remix by Phil Schaap to overcome "Marked sonic problems". The original album mix was reissued on CD for the first time by Verve/PolyGram Records in 1997.

According to J. D. Considine in The Rolling Stone Album Guide (1992), jazz fusion started on Emergency! where McLaughlin was first given the chance to combine jazz and rock. In a retrospective review for AllMusic, Leo Stanley said that it "shattered the boundaries between jazz and rock" with its "dense, adventurous, unpredictable soundscapes". Dennis Polkow of the Chicago Tribune wrote that in spite of the album's questionable sound quality, the music has an "energy and spirit" that has never been surpassed in fusion. According to Nicholson, recordings like Emergency! and the 1975 Miles Davis LP Agharta showed jazz rock paralleling free jazz by being "on the verge of creating a whole new musical language in the 1960s", suggesting the genre's "potential of evolving into something that might eventually define itself as a wholly independent genre quite apart from the sound and conventions of anything that had gone before." This development was stifled by commercialism, he said, as the genre "mutated into a peculiar species of jazz-inflected pop music that eventually took up residence on FM radio" at the end of the 1970s. Mojo regarded it as "jazz-rock's equivalent of Are You Experienced?".

== Track listing ==
Side one

1. "Emergency" (Williams) – 9:37
2. "Beyond Games" (Williams) – 8:19

Side two

1. "Where" (McLaughlin) – 12:11
2. "Vashkar" (Carla Bley) – 5:01

Side three

1. "Via the Spectrum Road" (McLaughlin, Williams) – 7:51
2. "Spectrum" (McLaughlin) – 8:52

Side four

1. "Sangria for Three" (Williams) – 13:08
2. "Something Spiritual" (Dave Herman) – 5:40 (Mistitled "Something Special" on some CD issues)

== Personnel ==
The Tony Williams Lifetime

- John McLaughlin – electric and acoustic guitars
- Tony Williams – drums, vocals
- Larry Young – organ

Production 1969 LP (Polydor)

- Ralph J. Gleason – liner notes
- Elaine Gongora – cover design
- Monte Kay – producer
- Jack Lewis – producer
- Sid Maurer – art direction, photography
- Gene Radice – recording, mixing

1991 CD (Polydor) remix by Phil Schaap

- James Isaacs – liner notes
- Joseph M. Palmaccio – digital mastering, final editing
- Paul Ramey – reissue producer
- Phil Schaap – liner notes ("Engineer's Comments & Disclaimer"), restoration, remastering
- Richard Seidel – reissue producer

1997 CD (Verve) original album mix

- Bill Levenson – executive producer
- Gary N. Mayo – remastering
- John McDermott – liner notes
- Jerry Rappaport – reissue producer
- Richard Seidel – executive producer
