= Civilization (Tony Williams album) =

Studio album by Tony Williams
- Released: 1987
- Recorded: November 1986
- Genre: Jazz
- Label: Blue Note

Tony Williams chronology
Foreign Intrigue (1985)	Civilization (1987)	Angel Street (1988)

Civilization is an album by the American musician Tony Williams, released in 1987. He supported it with a North American tour. The album peaked in the top five on Billboard's Jazz Albums chart.

== Production ==
Civilization was recorded in November 1986, after a five-month tour. Williams wrote of all its songs. He was backed by Billy Pierce on saxophone, Mulgrew Miller on piano, Wallace Roney on trumpet, and Charnett Moffett on bass. It was important to Williams to play in a hard-hitting style (with particular attention paid to the bass drum), despite a return to a more traditional jazz. He also used a drum machine on some of the tracks.

== Critical reception ==
Professional ratings
Review scores
Source	Rating
All Music Guide to Jazz	4/5 stars
The Encyclopedia of Popular Music	2/5 stars
MusicHound Jazz: The Essential Album Guide	3/5 stars
The Rolling Stone Album Guide	3/5 stars
The Windsor Star	A−

The Washington Post noted that "there isn't a tune ... that doesn't call attention to Williams's masterful touch, whether it's the way he prods the horns through the briskly descending chord changes on 'The Stump' or uses his cymbals to create glinting textures whenever the mood turns pensive." The St. Petersburg Times said that the album "swings hard; the compositions are dark-hued and sophisticated, the improvisation intense." The Windsor Star stated, "The group moves at a punchy pace, unleashes its message directly, focused, no loose ends, swinging though at times it just misses breaking loose."

The News and Observer opined that the album was Williams's best "straight-ahead jazz" release since the 1960s. The Star-Ledger called the songs "so good they herald the drummer as a premier composer of hard bop and modal-derived themes." In May 1987, The Commercial Appeal declared that Civilization was so far the best jazz album of 1987. The Lincoln Journal Star, The Buffalo News, and LA Weekly selected it as one of the best jazz albums of the year.

== Track listing ==
No.	Title	Length
1.	"Geo Rose"
2.	"Warrior"
3.	"Ancient Eyes"
4.	"Soweto Nights"
5.	"The Slump"
6.	"Civilization"
7.	"Mutants on the Beach"
8.	"Citadel"
