= Million Dollar Legs (album) =

Studio album by the New Tony Williams Lifetime
- Released: 1976
- Recorded: June 1976
- Studio: Caribou Ranch, Colorado
- Genre: Jazz fusion
- Length: 43:04
- Label: Columbia
- Producer: Bruce Botnick

The New Tony Williams Lifetime chronology
Believe It (1975)	Million Dollar Legs (1976)	Lifetime: The Collection (1992)

Professional ratings
Review scores
Source	Rating
AllMusic	2/5 stars
The Rolling Stone Jazz Record Guide	3/5 stars

Million Dollar Legs is the second album by the New Tony Williams Lifetime, released in 1976 on Columbia Records. The band was made up of jazz fusion drummer Tony Williams with guitarist Allan Holdsworth, keyboardist Alan Pasqua and bass guitarist Tony Newton.

== Track listing ==
1. "Sweet Revenge" (Tony Williams) — 6:03
2. "You Did It to Me Baby" (Williams, Al Cleveland) — 3:45
3. "Million Dollar Legs" (Williams) — 6:38
4. "Joy Filled Summer" (Tony Newton) — 5:50
5. "Lady Jane" (Alan Pasqua) — 3:56
6. "What You Do to Me" (Williams) — 6:38
7. "Inspirations of Love" (Newton) — 9:48

== Personnel ==
- Allan Holdsworth – guitar
- Alan Pasqua – keyboards
- Tony Newton – bass, vocals
- Tony Williams – drums
- Jack Nitzsche – string and horn arrangements
