= Lite Me Up =

Studio album by Herbie Hancock
- Released: April 15, 1982
- Recorded: 1981–1982 by George Massenburg
- Studios: George Massenburg Studio, L.A. Additional recording at El Dorado Studios, Hollywood; Garden Rake Studios, Studio City
- Genres: R&B, pop
- Length: 37:56
- Label: Columbia
- Producers: Herbie Hancock, Jay Graydon, Narada Michael Walden

Herbie Hancock chronology
Quartet (1982)	Lite Me Up (1982)	Future Shock (1983)

Professional ratings
Review scores
Source	Rating
AllMusic	2/5 stars
The Penguin Guide to Jazz Recordings	2/4 stars
The Rolling Stone Jazz Record Guide	1/5 stars

Lite Me Up is a pop album with a strong disco-funk feel by Herbie Hancock. It was Hancock's twenty-eighth album and first release without producer David Rubinson since 1969. On this album, Hancock was influenced by his long-time friend, producer Quincy Jones and sessions included many musicians associated with Jones including songwriter Rod Temperton, and Steve Lukather and Jeff Porcaro of Toto. The album was the first on which Hancock played the Synclavier, a digital polyphonic synthesizer.

== Track listing ==
No.	Title	Writer(s)	Producer(s)	Length
1.	"Lite Me Up!"	Rod Temperton	Herbie Hancock	3:41
2.	"The Bomb"	Rod Temperton; Herbie Hancock	Herbie Hancock	3:59
3.	"Gettin' to the Good Part"	Rod Temperton; Herbie Hancock	Herbie Hancock	6:12
4.	"Paradise"	Herbie Hancock; Jay Graydon; David Foster; Bill Champlin	Jay Graydon	4:30
5.	"Can't Hide Your Love"	Herbie Hancock; Narada Michael Walden; Jeffrey Cohen	Narada Michael Walden	3:53
6.	"The Fun Tracks"	Rod Temperton	Herbie Hancock	4:03
7.	"Motor Mouth"	Rod Temperton	Herbie Hancock	3:59
8.	"Give It All Your Heart"	Rod Temperton; Herbie Hancock	Herbie Hancock	7:39
Total length:				37:56

== Personnel ==
Musicians

- Herbie Hancock – lead vocals (4, 5), background vocals (1–3, 6–8), lead vocoder vocal (3, 7–8), Fender Rhodes, Clavitar, Yamaha CS-80, Moog Source, Mini Moog, Waves Mini Moog, Prophet 5, ARP 2600, ARP Odyssey, Emu digital keyboard, Oberheim 8-voice synthesizer, Roland Jupiter-8, Hohner Clavinet, Sennheiser vocoder, Synclavier digital synthesizer, Linn Drum synthesizer, piano
- John Robinson – drums (1–3, 6–8)
- Jeff Porcaro – drums (4)
- Narada Michael Walden – drums (5), arrangements (5)
- Louis Johnson – bass (1–3, 6–8)
- Abraham Laboriel – bass (4)
- Randy Jackson – bass (5)
- Steve Lukather – guitar (1)
- David Williams – guitar (2, 3, 6–8)
- Jay Graydon – guitar (4)
- Corrado Rustici – guitar (5)
- Michael Boddicker – synthesizer (3), additional synthesizer programming (2, 3, 6)
- David Foster – acoustic piano (4), background vocal and keyboard arrangements (4)
- Rick Kelly – Synclavier programming (4)
- Frank Martin – synthesizers (5)
- Jerry Hey – trumpet and flugelhorn (1–3, 5–8), horn arrangements (1–4, 6–8), string arrangements (1, 3, 6–8)
- "The Dr. Negroidal" – trumpet (1–3, 5–8)
- Chuck Findley – trumpet and trombone (1–3, 5–8)
- Bill Reichenbach Jr. – trombone (1–3, 5–8)
- Gary Herbig – saxophone and woodwinds (1–3, 5–8)
- Larry Williams – saxophone and woodwinds (1–3, 5–8)
- Wayne Anthony – lead vocals (1, 2, 6, 7)
- Patti Austin – background vocals (1–3, 6–8)
- Jim Gilstrap – background vocals (1–3, 5–8)
- Paulette Williams – background vocals (1–3, 6–8)
- John Lehman – background vocals (1–3, 5–8)
- Edie Lehmann – background vocals (1–3, 6–8)
- Bill Champlin – background vocals (4)
- Richard Page – background vocals (4)
- Venette Gloud – background vocals (4)
- Scherrie Payne – background vocals (5)
- Linda Lawrence – background vocals (5)
- Patrice Rushen – vocoder vocals (8)
- Rod Temperton – rhythm and vocal arrangements (1–3, 6–8)

Technical

- Herbie Hancock – producer (1–3, 6–8)
- Jay Graydon – producer (4), engineer [vocal track] (4)
- Narada Michael Walden – producer (5)
- George Massenburg – engineer, mixing, engineer [keyboard overdubs and background vocals] (4)
- Leslie Ann Jones – engineer [basic track] (4)
- Ron Pendragon – additional engineering, engineer [keyboard overdubs and background vocals] (4)
- Murray Dvorkin – second engineer, second engineer [keyboard overdubs and background vocals] (4)
- Barbara Rooney – second engineer
- Robert Spano – second engineer
- Sarco – second engineer [basic track] (4), second engineer [background vocals and additional keyboard overdubs] (5)
- Ian Eales – second engineer [vocal track] (4)
- Ken Kessie – engineer and mixing (5)
- Maureen Droney – second engineer [basic track and overdubs] (5)
- Wayne Lewis – second engineer [basic track and overdubs] (5)
- David Frazer – second engineer [basic track and overdubs] (5)
- Tony Meilandt – associate producer
- Bryan Bell – keyboard engineer
- Lee Ethier – keyboard engineer
- Mike Reese – mastering
- Mick Haggerty – front cover design
- Kaz Tsuruta – back cover photography
