= Ego (Tony Williams Lifetime album) =

Studio album by the Tony Williams Lifetime
- Released: 1971
- Recorded: February and March 1971
- Genre: Jazz
- Length: 42:18
- Label: Polydor; 24-4065
- Producer: Jack Lewis

The Tony Williams Lifetime chronology
Turn It Over (1970)	Ego (1971)	The Old Bum's Rush (1972)

Ego is the third album by the American jazz fusion group the Tony Williams Lifetime, led by drummer Tony Williams. It was recorded during February and March 1971, and was released later that year by Polydor Records. On the album, Williams is joined by guitarist Ted Dunbar, organist Larry Young (Khalid Yasin), bassist Ron Carter and percussionists Don Alias and Warren Smith. Jack Bruce performs vocals on “Two Worlds”.

Tracks from Ego were reissued as part of the 1997 compilation Spectrum: The Anthology.

== Reception ==
Professional ratings
Review scores
Source	Rating
AllMusic	3/5 stars
The Penguin Guide to Jazz	3.5/4 stars

In a review for AllMusic, Stewart Mason called the album "easily the weirdest record the Tony Williams Lifetime ever released," and wrote: "Ego is an experimental blend of post-hard bop jazz and the spacier end of psychedelic rock... parts of the album sound like Atom Heart Mother-era Pink Floyd."

Writing for Jazz Times, Giovanni Russonello commented: "Williams was a master at harnessing the tides of change; with Ted Dunbar in the guitar chair, Ego boasts a buoyant, slow-burning grace that was new to Lifetime... Not to be overlooked are the album’s three percussion-only showcases."

Drummer and author Questlove praised the song "There Comes a Time," writing: "The process dramatized in this song, the process of leaving behind modal jazz, is also the process of leaning into something else, even if that something else is not yet known. Every time there comes a time, it is both a time for ending and a time for beginning."

The authors of The Penguin Guide to Jazz Recordings noted that, in relation to Turn It Over, the album represented "a sharp move towards a more percussion-oriented sound." They remarked: "Dunbar's guitar-playing was much more linear and blues-based than McLaughlin's, and Ron Carter's bass work provided a more solid spine than Bruce's blub-a-lib slurs."

== Track listing ==
1. "Clap City" – 0:54
2. "There Comes a Time" – 5:54
3. "Piskow's Filigree" – 3:52
4. "Circa" – 6:27
5. "Two Worlds" – 4:26
6. "Some Hip Drum Shit" – 1:31
7. "Lonesome Wells (Gwendy Trio)" – 7:29
8. "Mom and Dad" – 5:42
9. "The Urchins of Shermêse" – 6:25

== Personnel ==
- Tony Williams – drums, vocals
- Ted Dunbar – guitar
- Khalid Yasin – organ
- Ron Carter – bass, cello
- Don Alias – percussion
- Warren Smith – percussion
- Jack Bruce – vocals (5)
