= The Free Spirits =

American jazz-rock band

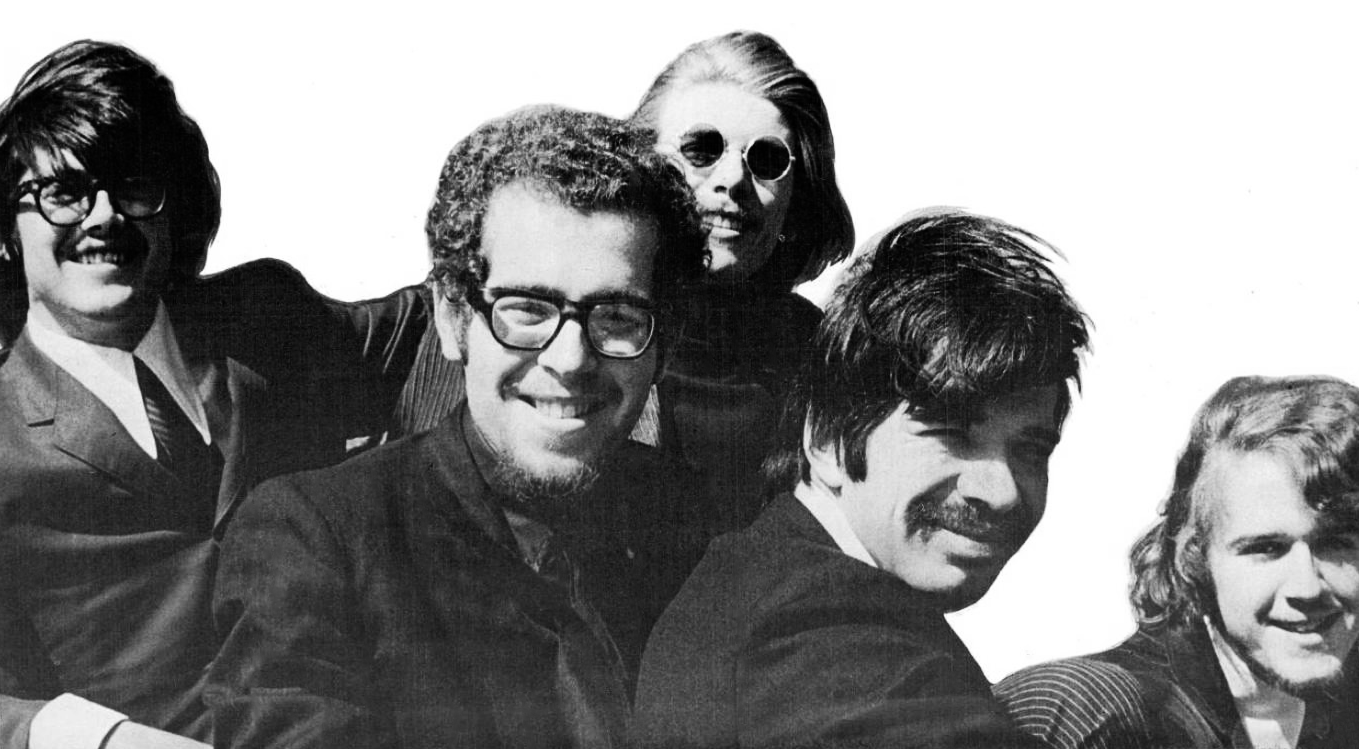
- The Free Spirits in 1966

Background information
- Origin: New York City, U.S.
- Genres: Jazz rock
- Years active: 1965–1968
- Labels: Sunbeam, ABC
- Past members: Larry Coryell; Bob Moses; Jim Pepper; Chris Hills; Columbus "Chip" Baker

The Free Spirits was an American band credited as the first jazz-rock group. The band also incorporated elements of pop and garage rock. Their first album, Out of Sight and Sound, was recorded in 1966 and released in 1967.

== History ==
The band formed in New York as a jazz group. Every member except Chip Baker had a background in jazz. According to drummer Bob Moses, guitarist Larry Coryell turned the group to more rock-oriented music. The band played several times in a New York club called The Scene but made little money from the shows, getting paid only ten dollars as a group per night. The band also performed with Mitch Ryder and The Rascals.

By 1967, Coryell left the band to play with Gary Burton. Moses also joined Burton because he "knew that it wasn't going to be the same without Coryell". Pepper, Hills, and Baker formed the band Everything is Everything with Lee Reinoehl on Hammond C-3 organ and both John Waller and Jim Zitro on drums. Vanguard released their self-titled album, which included Pepper's composition "Witchi Tai To". Moses later recorded with Jack DeJohnette, Steve Swallow, Pat Metheny, Jaco Pastorius, and Coryell.

== Personnel ==
- Larry Coryell – lead guitar, sitar, lead vocals
- Columbus "Chip" Baker – rhythm guitar, backing vocals
- Jim Pepper – tenor sax, flute
- Chris Hills – bass guitar
- Bob Moses – drums

== Discography ==
- Out of Sight and Sound (ABC, 1967)
- Live at the Scene (Sunbeam, 2011)
