= The Story of Neptune =

Studio album by Tony Williams
- Released: 1992
- Genre: Jazz
- Label: Blue Note
- Producer: Tony Williams

Tony Williams chronology
Native Heart (1990)	The Story of Neptune (1992)	Tokyo Live (1993)

The Story of Neptune is an album by the American musician Tony Williams. It was released in 1992 through Blue Note Records, his fifth album for the label. Williams supported the album by touring with the Benny Green Trio. The Story of Neptune peaked at No. 6 on Billboard's Top Jazz Albums chart.

== Production ==
The album's songs were written or arranged by Williams. "Neptune" is a three-part composition. "Blackbird" is a cover of the Beatles song. "Birdlike" was written by Freddie Hubbard. Wallace Roney played trumpet on the album; Mulgrew Miller played piano. It was the last album by Williams's long-standing quintet.

== Critical reception ==
Professional ratings
Review scores
Source	Rating
AllMusic	4.5/5 stars
The Rolling Stone Album Guide	3.5/5 stars

The Washington Post wrote that, "whether vigorously emphatic or impeccably subdued, [Williams's] touch is felt everywhere, propelling some tunes with tumultuous rhythms and underpinning others with a gently swinging pulse." The Baltimore Sun determined that, "from the giddy extrapolations of 'Neptune: Fear Not' to the carefully arranged ensemble work of 'Blackbird', the playing here is never less than excellent."

The Times opined that Wallace Roney's "diamond-cut lines are the perfect foil to [Williams's] only splintery percussion, but the leader has also learned to play more melodically, exchanging some of the fiery press-rolls he derived from Art Blakey for the quieter and more measured approach of the other great bop master, Max Roach." The Guardian concluded that "pianist Mulgrew Miller builds from his central hammer-fisted role on the opening track to give probably his strongest performance with the group."

== Track listing ==
No.	Title	Length
1.	"Neptune: Overture"
2.	"Neptune: Fear Not"
3.	"Neptune: Creatures of Conscience"
4.	"Blackbird"
5.	"Crime Scene"
6.	"Poinciana"
7.	"Birdlike"

== Personnel ==
- Bill Pierce – tenor saxophone, soprano saxophone
- Wallace Roney – trumpet
- Mulgrew Miller – piano
- Ira Coleman – acoustic bass
- Tony Williams – drums, percussion
