= Arcana (American band) =

American jazz fusion band

- Origin: USA
- Genres: Avant-garde jazz, jazz fusion, free jazz
- Years active: 1995–1997
- Labels: DIW, Axiom/Island
- Past members: Bill Laswell; Tony Williams; Derek Bailey

Arcana was an American jazz fusion band that formed in 1995 and originally comprised guitarist Derek Bailey, bassist Bill Laswell and drummer Tony Williams. The original lineup released one album, The Last Wave, in July 1996, before Bailey left the band. Guitar duties for the second album were recorded by guest musicians Nicky Skopelitis and Buckethead, and Arc of the Testimony was released in October 1997. The band split up after the release of their second album due to the death of Williams in February 1997.

== Band members ==
- Bill Laswell – bass, six-string bass, eight-string bass, fretless bass, synthesizer, sound effects
- Tony Williams – drums
- Derek Bailey – guitar (The Last Wave)

=== Guest musicians ===
The following musicians contributed to Arcana's second album, Arc of the Testimony:

- Nicky Skopelitis – guitar, twelve-string guitar
- Buckethead – guitar
- Pharoah Sanders – tenor saxophone
- Byard Lancaster – alto saxophone, bass clarinet
- Graham Haynes – cornet

== Discography ==
- The Last Wave (DIW, 1996)
- Arc of the Testimony (Axiom/Island, 1997)
