= Tony Williams (drummer) =

American jazz drummer (1945–1997)

- Williams in November 1965

Background information
- Born: Anthony Tillmon Williams; December 12, 1945; Chicago, Illinois, U.S.
- Died: February 23, 1997 (aged 51) Daly City, California, U.S.
- Genres: Jazz; post-bop; jazz fusion; modal jazz
- Occupations: Musician; composer; producer; bandleader
- Instrument: Drums
- Years active: 1961–1997

Anthony Tillmon Williams (December 12, 1945 – February 23, 1997) was an American jazz drummer. Williams first gained fame as a member of Miles Davis's "Second Great Quintet", and later pioneered jazz fusion with Davis's group and his own combo, The Tony Williams Lifetime. In 1970, music critic Robert Christgau described him as "probably the best drummer in the world". Williams was inducted into the Modern Drummer Hall of Fame in 1986 and the Percussive Arts Society Hall of Fame in 1997.

== Life and career ==
Williams was born in Chicago, Illinois, and grew up in Boston, Massachusetts. He was of African, Portuguese, and Chinese descent. He studied with drummer Alan Dawson at the age of 11 and began playing professionally at the age of 13 with saxophonist Sam Rivers. At age 16, saxophonist Jackie McLean hired him. As a young drummer, Williams was influenced by Max Roach, Art Blakey, Philly Joe Jones, Roy Haynes, Louis Hayes, and Jimmy Cobb.

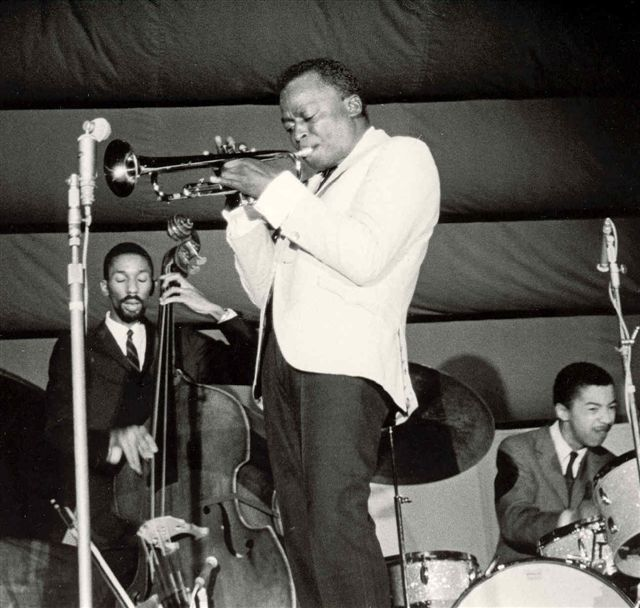
Williams (right) with an early iteration of Miles Davis's "Second Great Quintet" in Antibes, c. July 1963. On bass is Ron Carter and not pictured are Herbie Hancock and George Coleman.

Aged 17, Williams joined Miles Davis in what was later dubbed Davis's Second Great Quintet—with saxophonist Wayne Shorter, pianist Herbie Hancock, and bassist Ron Carter. Davis had been in something of a creative lull, and critics noted the young Tony Williams's playing spurred the others on. Williams was a vital element of the group, called by Davis in his autobiography "the center that the group's sound revolved around". His playing helped redefine the role of the jazz rhythm section through the use of polyrhythms and metric modulation. Meanwhile, he recorded his first two albums as a leader for the Blue Note label: Life Time (1964) and Spring (1965). He also recorded as a sideman for the label including the classics Out to Lunch! with Eric Dolphy and Point of Departure with Andrew Hill, both in 1964.

In 1969, Williams formed The Tony Williams Lifetime, with John McLaughlin on guitar and Larry Young on organ. Lifetime was a pioneering band of the fusion movement. Their first album was Emergency!. For the album Turn It Over, the trio was joined by bass guitarist and vocalist Jack Bruce. After several more releases and touring, Lifetime disbanded. In 1975, Williams formed "The New Tony Williams Lifetime", featuring bassist Tony Newton, keyboardist Alan Pasqua, and guitarist Allan Holdsworth, and recorded two albums for Columbia Records: Believe It and Million Dollar Legs.

In 1976, Williams reunited with his colleagues from the Miles Davis Quintet. (Davis himself was in the midst of a six-year hiatus and was "replaced" by trumpeter Freddie Hubbard.) A record of their concert was later released as V.S.O.P. ("Very Special One-time Performance"), the name under which the group toured and recorded for several years.

In 1979, Williams, McLaughlin, and bassist Jaco Pastorius united for a performance at the Havana Jazz Festival. This trio came to be known as the Trio of Doom, and a recording of their performance (along with some studio tracks recorded in New York shortly thereafter) was released in 2007. Williams and Pastorius also played together on "Good Question" from the 1978 Herbie Hancock album Sunlight. Williams appears with the group Fuse One on their 1980 album.

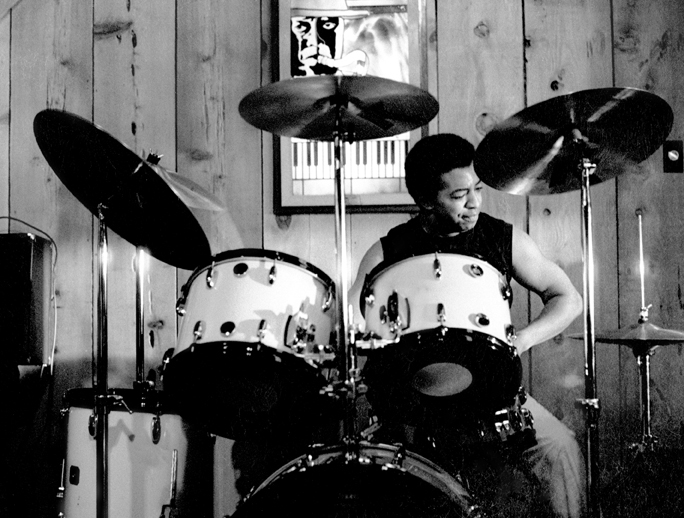
Williams in Half Moon Bay, California, 1986

In 1985, Williams returned to Blue Note with the album Foreign Intrigue. Eventually Williams formed his own acoustic quintet with trumpeter Wallace Roney, saxophonist Bill Pierce, pianist Mulgrew Miller, and bassist Ira Coleman. The quintet played Williams's compositions almost exclusively, recording and touring extensively from 1986 to 1992, culminating in the album The Story of Neptune.

Williams guested with the band Public Image Ltd, fronted by John Lydon, on their release titled Album (1986).

One of his final recordings was The Last Wave by the trio known as Arcana, a release organized by Bill Laswell.

== Personal life and death ==
Williams lived and taught in the San Francisco Bay Area until his death in 1997.

On February 20, 1997, Williams checked into Seton Medical Center in Daly City, California, suffering from stomach pain. Three days later, while recuperating from gallbladder surgery, he died from a heart attack. He was 51 years old.

== Discography ==
=== As leader/co-leader ===
| Recording date | Title | Label | Year released | Notes |
|---|---|---|---|---|
| 1964-08 | Life Time | Blue Note | 1965 | |
| 1965-08 | Spring | Blue Note | 1966 | |
| 1969-05 | Emergency! | Verve | 1969 | |
| 1970-07 | Turn It Over | Verve | 1970 | |
| 1971-02, 1971-03 | Ego | Polydor | 1971 | |
| 1972? | The Old Bum's Rush | Polydor | 1972 | |
| 1975-07 | Believe It | Columbia | 1975 | |
| 1976-06 | Million Dollar Legs | Columbia | 1976 | |
| 1976-09 | Live at the Village Gate | Hi Hat | 2017 | Live; bootleg recording |
| 1978-06 | Live Tokyo 1978 | Hi Hat | 2018 | Live; bootleg recording |
| 1979 | The Joy of Flying | Columbia | 1978 | |
| 1980-06 | Play or Die | P.S. Productions | 1980 | With Tom Grant and Patrick O'Hearn |
| 1985-06 | Foreign Intrigue | Blue Note | 1985 | |
| 1986-11 | Civilization | Blue Note | 1987 | |
| 1988-04 | Angel Street | Blue Note | 1988 | |
| 1989-09 | Native Heart | Blue Note | 1990 | |
| 1991-11, 1991-12 | The Story of Neptune | Blue Note | 1992 | |
| 1992-03 | Tokyo Live | Blue Note | 1993 | [2-CD] Live |
| 1995-12 | Wilderness | Ark 21 | 1996 | |
| 1996-09 | Young at Heart | Columbia | 1997 | |

Collaborations
With Herbie Hancock, Wayne Shorter, Ron Carter, and Wallace Roney

- A Tribute to Miles (Qwest / Reprise / Warner Bros., 1994) – rec. 1992, 1994

Compilations

- Lifetime: The Collection (Columbia, 1992)[2-CD] – combined Believe It (1975) and Million Dollar Legs (1976)

=== As a member ===
The Great Jazz Trio
With Hank Jones and Ron Carter

- I'm Old Fashioned with Sadao Watanabe (East Wind, 1976)
- Love for Sale (East Wind, 1976)
- The Great Jazz Trio at the Village Vanguard (East Wind, 1977)
- The Great Jazz Trio at the Village Vanguard Vol. 2 (East Wind, 1977)
- Kindness Joy Love & Happiness (East Wind, 1977)
- Bird of Paradise with Sadao Watanabe (Flying Disk, 1977)
- Milestones (East Wind, 1978)
- New Wine in Old Bottles with Jackie McLean (East Wind, 1978)
- Direct from L.A. (East Wind, 1978)
- Carnaval with Sadao Watanabe (Galaxy, 1978)
- The Great Tokyo Meeting (East Wind, 1978)
- The Great Jazz Trio at the Village Vanguard Again (East Wind, 2000) – rec. 1977. posthumous release.

Trio of Doom
With Jaco Pastorius and John McLaughlin

- Trio of Doom (Columbia Legacy, 2007) – rec. 1979. posthumous release.

Arcana
With Derek Bailey and Bill Laswell

- The Last Wave (DIW, 1996) – rec. 1995
- Arc of the Testimony also with Pharoah Sanders (Axiom/Island, 1997) – posthumous release

=== As sideman ===
With Chet Baker

- You Can't Go Home Again (Horizon, 1977)
- Chet Baker / Wolfgang Lackerschmid with Wolfgang Lackerschmid (Sandra Music Productions, 1980) – rec. 1979
- The Best Thing for You (A&M, 1989) – rec. 1977

With Ron Carter

- Third Plane (Milestone, 1978)
- 1 + 3 (JVC, 1979) – live rec. 1978
- Parade (Milestone, 1980) – rec. 1979
- Carnaval (Galaxy, 1983) – live rec. 1978
- Etudes (Elektra/Musician, 1983) – rec. 1982

With Miles Davis

- Seven Steps to Heaven (Columbia, 1963)
- Miles Davis in Europe (Columbia, 1963)
- Four & More (Columbia, 1964)
- My Funny Valentine: Miles Davis in Concert (Columbia, 1964)
- Miles in Berlin (CBS, 1964)
- E.S.P. (Columbia, 1965)
- Miles Smiles (Columbia, 1967)
- Sorcerer (Columbia, 1967)
- Nefertiti (Columbia, 1967)
- Miles in the Sky (Columbia, 1968)
- Filles de Kilimanjaro (Columbia, 1968)
- Miles in Tokyo (CBS/Sony, 1969) – rec. 1964
- In a Silent Way (Columbia, 1969)
- Water Babies (Columbia, 1976) – rec. 1967–1968
- Circle in the Round (Columbia, 1979) – rec. 1967–1968
- Directions (Columbia, 1981) – rec. 1967–1968
- The Complete Live at the Plugged Nickel 1965 (Columbia Legacy, 1995) – rec. 1965
- Miles Davis & Gil Evans: The Complete Columbia Studio Recordings – four takes of "Falling Water" (Columbia Legacy, 1996) – rec. 1968
- Live in Europe 1967: The Bootleg Series Vol. 1 (Columbia Legacy, 2012)
- Miles Davis at Newport 1955-1975: The Bootleg Series Vol. 4 (Columbia Legacy, 2015)

With Tommy Flanagan

- The Master Trio (Baybridge, 1983)
- Blues in the Closet (Baybridge, 1983)

With Herbie Hancock

- My Point of View (Blue Note, 1963)
- Empyrean Isles (Blue Note, 1964)
- Maiden Voyage (Blue Note, 1965)
- V.S.O.P. (Columbia, 1977) – rec. 1976
- V.S.O.P.: The Quintet (Columbia, 1977)
- V.S.O.P.: Tempest in the Colosseum (CBS/Sony, 1977)
- Herbie Hancock Trio (CBS/Sony, 1977)
- Sunlight (Columbia, 1978)
- V.S.O.P.: Live Under the Sky (CBS/Sony, 1979)
- Mr. Hands (Columbia, 1980)
- Herbie Hancock Trio (Columbia, 1982) – rec. 1981
- Quartet (CBS/Sony, 1982)
- One Night with Blue Note Preserved (Blue Note, 1985)
- Round Midnight (soundtrack) (Columbia, 1986) – rec. 1985
- Future 2 Future (Transparent Music, 2001)

With Jackie McLean

- One Step Beyond (Blue Note, 1964) – rec. 1963
- Vertigo (Blue Note, 1980) – rec. 1959-1963

With Grachan Moncur III

- Evolution (Blue Note, 1964) – rec. 1963
- Some Other Stuff (Blue Note, 1965) – rec. 1964

With Sonny Rollins

- Easy Living (Milestone, 1977)
- Don't Stop the Carnival (Milestone, 1978) – live
- No Problem (Milestone, 1982) – rec. 1981

With McCoy Tyner

- Supertrios (Milestone, 1977)
- Passion Dance (Milestone, 1978) – live
- Counterpoints (Milestone, 2004) – rec. 1978

With others

- Geri Allen, Twenty One (Blue Note, 1994)
- George Cables, Phantom of the City (Contemporary, 1985)
- Stanley Clarke, Stanley Clarke (Nemperor, 1974)
- Eric Dolphy, Out to Lunch! (Blue Note, 1964)
- Kenny Dorham, Una Mas (Blue Note, 1964)
- Gil Evans, There Comes a Time (RCA, 1976)
- Hal Galper, Now Hear This (Enja, 1977)
- Stan Getz, Captain Marvel (Columbia, 1972)
- Dexter Gordon, The Other Side of Round Midnight (Blue Note, 1986)
- Jonas Hellborg and the Soldier String Quartet, The Word (Axiom, 1991)
- Joe Henderson, Relaxin' at Camarillo (Contemporary, 1981)
- Andrew Hill, Point of Departure (Blue Note, 1965)
- Terumasa Hino, May Dance (Flying Disk, 1977)
- Allan Holdsworth, Atavachron – Looking Glass (Enigma, 1986)
- Charles Lloyd, Of Course, Of Course (Columbia, 1965)
- Michael Mantler, Movies (Watt, 1978)
- Ray Manzarek, The Golden Scarab (Mercury, 1973)
- Branford Marsalis, Renaissance (Columbia, 1987)
- Wynton Marsalis, Wynton Marsalis (Columbia, 1981)
- John McLaughlin, Electric Guitarist (Columbia, 1978)
- Marcus Miller, The Sun Don't Lie (PRA, 1993)
- Mulgrew Miller, The Countdown (Landmark, 1989)
- Yoko Ono, Starpeace (PolyGram, 1985)
- Michel Petrucciani, Marvellous (Dreyfus, 1994)
- Pop Workshop, Song For The Pterodactyl (Grammofonverket, 1974)
- Public Image Limited, Album (Virgin, 1985)
- Don Pullen, New Beginnings (Blue Note, 1988)
- Sam Rivers, Fuchsia Swing Song (Blue Note, 1964)
- Wallace Roney, Verses (Muse, 1987)
- Carlos Santana, The Swing of Delight (Columbia, 1980)
- Travis Shook, Travis Shook (Columbia, 1993)
- Wayne Shorter, The Soothsayer (Blue Note, 1979)
- Weather Report, Mr. Gone (Columbia, 1978)
