= The Quintet (album) =

1977 live album by V.S.O.P.

Live album by V.S.O.P.
- Released: October 1977
- Recorded: July 16–18, 1977
- Genre: Jazz
- Length: 70:13
- Label: Columbia
- Producer: David Rubinson, Jeffrey Cohen

V.S.O.P. chronology
Herbie Hancock Trio (1977)	The Quintet (1977)	Tempest in the Colosseum (1977)

Professional ratings
Review scores
Source	Rating
AllMusic	4/5 stars
The Rolling Stone Jazz Record Guide	5/5 stars

The Quintet is an album by V.S.O.P. It was compiled from two concert performances: one at the Greek Theatre, University of California, Berkeley, on July 16, 1977; the other at the San Diego Civic Theatre on July 18, 1977. The quintet were keyboardist Herbie Hancock, trumpeter Freddie Hubbard, drummer Tony Williams, bassist Ron Carter and saxophonist Wayne Shorter (on tenor and soprano). The album was originally released in October 1977 as a two-disc LP by Columbia Records.

== Reception ==
An excerpt from a review in the January 1978 issue of DownBeat magazine is quoted on the back of the album and describes the performance:

What the audience applauds on this album transcends mere form, technique and instrumentation. They were thrilled by the charisma generated by five masters who listened to one another's inner ears, spoke to each other at multiple levels, and, no matter how dense the musical content, conveyed their messages to the audience with amazing clarity.

== Legacy ==
"Third Plane" and "Lawra" were also released on a studio album, Third Plane (1977), which Hancock, Carter, and Williams had recorded a few days before, on July 13, 1977. "Third Plane" became one of Carter's most renowned compositions.

"Byrdlike" was originally recorded by Hubbard for his 1962's Ready for Freddie. Shorter also played on this version.

"Dolores" was originally recorded in 1967 by the Miles Davis Quintet (consisting of Shorter, Hancock, Carter, and Williams) and was released on 1967's Miles Smiles.

"Jessica" was originally released on Hancock's Fat Albert Rotunda album, recorded in 1969.

"Little Waltz" is a song from Carter's Piccolo album, recorded in March 1977.

== Track listing ==
Side 1

1. "One of a Kind" (Hubbard) – 9:27
2. "Third Plane" (Carter) – 7:19

Side 2

1. "Jessica" (Hancock) – 7:02
2. "Lawra" (Williams) – 9:43

Side 3

1. "Darts" (Hancock) – 8:54
2. "Dolores" (Shorter) – 11:31

Side 4

1. "Little Waltz" (Carter) – 9:33
2. "Byrdlike" (Hubbard) – 8:05

== Personnel ==
Musicians

- Freddie Hubbard – flugelhorn, trumpet
- Wayne Shorter – soprano saxophone, tenor saxophone
- Herbie Hancock – piano, keyboards, vocals
- Ron Carter – double bass
- Tony Williams – drums

Production

- David Rubinson – producer
- Jeffrey Cohen – associate producer
- Fred Catero – recording engineer
- Bryan Bell – live audio engineer
- Chris Minto – assistant engineer
- Les D. Cooper – remote crew
- Dennis Mays – remote crew
- Shawn Murphy – remote crew
- Paul Sandweiss – remote crew
- Ray Thompson – remote crew
- Russ Anderson – design
- Herbie Green – design
- Bruce Talamon – photography
- Kaz Tsuruta – photography
- Conrad Silvert – liner notes
