= Out of Sight and Sound =

Studio album by the Free Spirits
- Released: January 1967
- Recorded: 1966
- Studios: Van Gelder, Englewood Cliffs, New Jersey
- Genre: Jazz rock
- Length: 36:33
- Labels: ABC; ABC-S 593
- Producer: Bob Thiele

The Free Spirits chronology
Out of Sight and Sound (1967)	Live at the Scene (2011)

Out of Sight and Sound is the only studio album by jazz rock group the Free Spirits. It was recorded in 1966, and was issued on LP in 1967 by ABC Records. The album, recorded by Rudy Van Gelder and produced by Bob Thiele, features guitarists Larry Coryell and Columbus "Chip" Baker, saxophonist Jim Pepper, bassist Chris Hills, and drummer Bob Moses. In 2006, it was reissued on CD by Sunbeam Records.

Out of Sight and Sound has been cited as being one of the first recordings to blend jazz and rock music, preceding Gary Burton's Duster, which also featured Coryell, by a year. Coryell recalled: "The Free Spirits came about as a result of five tripped-out cats... from all parts of the world who moved into the same block of the same neighborhood. We felt that we would be years ahead of our time if we made the music we wanted to... What later became known as jazz-rock."

Unfortunately, the album had little impact, and the band members were dissatisfied with it, feeling that it didn't capture the energy of their live sets. According to Moses, it had "absolutely nothing to do with how the group was... Everybody... hated it." Coryell and Moses left the band shortly after the album's release, and the remaining members, plus two additional players, went on to form a group named Everything is Everything. More than forty years after the release of Out of Sight and Sound, Sunbeam Records issued a live Free Spirits recording from February 22, 1967, that the musicians felt was a more accurate reflection of the band's capabilities.

== Reception ==
Professional ratings
Review scores
Source	Rating
AllMusic	4.5/5 stars
PopMatters	9/10

In a review for AllMusic, Richie Unterberger wrote: "These tentative explorations into relatively uncharted jazz-rock territory retain an engaging, freewheeling verve and warm humor, although the lyrics are sometimes self-consciously hip and spacy... Obscure even in its day and long out of print, it's worth seeking out, though more for fans of '60s rock than jazz."

Daniel Spicer of PopMatters called the album "an absolute mother lode" for "anyone with even a passing interest in the cross-fertilisation of counter-cultural rock 'n' roll with '60s avant-garde jazz." He stated: "this is the sound of a bunch of very young men in their early twenties, refusing to be constrained by expectation, embarking on musical careers at a time when the whole Western world was in upheaval... To put it simply, this little record is a joy."

Writing for Something Else!, Beverly Paterson commented: "Somewhat raw and ramshackle, Out of Sight and Sound still manages to reveal the talent and inventiveness driving the band. Not beholden to any one single style, the band certainly were free spirits, and here on their lone album they embrace their vision with determination."

Exclaim!'s Kevin Hainey described the album as a "vastly overlooked... classic of psychedelic jazz rock innovation," and remarked: "Out of Sight and Sound is brimming over with jazzy grooves, frenetic psychedelic blowing, and tuneful arrangements filled with vocal harmonies and bluesy riffs... there are just too many crazy and inspired moments here to list, but these strangely accessible yet radical songs will leave your head and hips revolving for many spins to come."

Matt Fripp of JazzFuel included the album in an article titled "The Best Jazz Fusion Albums of All Time", and noted its "freewheeling distorted guitars and complex chord progressions."

The editors of Billboard included the album in their "Special Merit Picks", writing: "The group fuses rock sound with the jazz backgrounds of the members... Many of the 12 selections have psychedelic undertones."

== Track listing ==
Side A

1. "Don't Look Now (But Your Head is Turned Around)" (Coryell) – 2:12
2. "I'm Gonna Be Free" (Coryell) – 3:21
3. "LBOD" (Moses, Coryell) – 3:00
4. "Sunday Telephone" (Baker, Coryell) – 2:52
5. "Blue Water Mother" (Baker, Coryell) – 2:39
6. "Girl of the Mountain" (Baker, Coryell) – 2:38

Side B

1. "Cosmic Daddy Dancer" (Baker, Coryell) – 2:31
2. "Bad News Cat" (Coryell) – 3:19
3. "Storm" (Baker, Coryell) – 2:09
4. "Early Mornin' Fear" (Coryell, Nick Hyams) – 2:33
5. "Angels Can't Be True" (Coryell) – 2:39
6. "Tattoo Man" (Baker, Coryell) – 2:23

== Personnel ==
- Larry Coryell – guitar, sitar
- Columbus "Chip" Baker – guitar
- Jim Pepper – saxophone
- Chris Hills – bass guitar, vocals
- Bob Moses – drums

== Additional personnel ==
- Bob Thiele – producer
- Rudy Van Gelder – engineer
- Nat Hentoff – liner notes (original LP)
- Richie Unterberger – liner notes (CD reissue)
