= Believe It (album) =

Studio album by the New Tony Williams Lifetime
- Released: 1975
- Recorded: July 1975
- Genre: Jazz fusion
- Length: 44:11
- Label: Columbia
- Producer: Bruce Botnick

The New Tony Williams Lifetime chronology
Believe It (1975)	Million Dollar Legs (1976)

Believe It is the first album by the New Tony Williams Lifetime, released in 1975 on Columbia Records. The New Lifetime was a jazz fusion band formed by the drummer Tony Williams with Allan Holdsworth on guitar, Alan Pasqua on keyboards and Tony Newton on bass.

== Reception ==
Professional ratings
Review scores
Source	Rating
AllMusic	4/5 stars
The Penguin Guide to Jazz Recordings	3/4 stars
The Rolling Stone Jazz Record Guide	4/5 stars

The Rolling Stone Jazz Record Guide's John Swenson described the albums Believe It and Million Dollar Legs as "both funk fusion delights featuring the playing of ex-Soft Machine axeman Allan Holdsworth".

The compositions "Fred", "Proto Cosmos" and "Red Alert" are also featured on the Allan Holdsworth DVD Live at Yoshi's, released in 2007. Holdsworth has often stated that his time with the drummer was the most influential formative stage of his career.

== Track listing ==
1. "Snake Oil" (Tony Newton) — 6:30
2. "Fred" (Allan Holdsworth) — 6:48
3. "Proto-Cosmos" (Alan Pasqua) — 4:02
4. "Red Alert" (Newton) — 4:39
5. "Wildlife" (Tony Williams) — 5:22
6. "Mr Spock" (Holdsworth) — 6:15
7. "Celebration" (Williams) — [Bonus Track] 4:01
8. "Letsby" (Holdsworth) — [Bonus Track] 6:34

== Personnel ==
- Allan Holdsworth – guitar
- Alan Pasqua – keyboards
- Tony Newton – bass
- Tony Williams – drums

Technical

- Art Direction: Ed Lee
- Photography: Eric Meola
- Hand Lettering: Gerard Huerta
