= The Tony Williams Lifetime =

American jazz fusion group led by Tony Williams

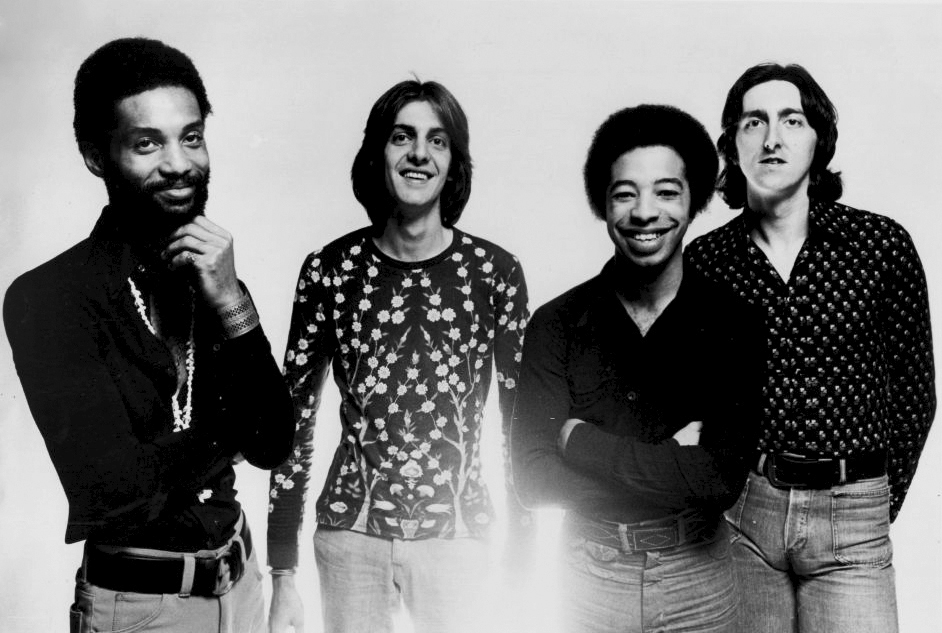
- The Tony Williams Lifetime in 1976 (The New Tony Williams Lifetime). From left: Tony Newton, Alan Pasqua, Tony Williams and Allan Holdsworth

Background information
- Genres: Jazz fusion
- Years active: 1969–1976
- Labels: Polydor/PolyGram Records; Columbia/CBS Records; Verve/PolyGram Records; P.S. Productions
- Past members: Tony Williams (deceased); John McLaughlin; Larry Young (deceased); Jack Bruce (deceased); Allan Holdsworth (deceased); Tony Newton; Alan Pasqua; Ted Dunbar (deceased); Warren Smith; Don Alias (deceased); Juini Booth (deceased); Ron Carter; Tom Grant; Bunny Brunel; Tod Carver; Bruce Harris; Patrick O'Hearn; Michael Formanek; Marlon Graves; Mike Hoffmann; Paul Potyen; Gerry Mule'; Linda/Laura 'Tequila' Logan; Webster Lewis; David Horowitz; Herb Bushler; Bob Cacciola; Lyle Workman; Mario Cipollina

The Tony Williams Lifetime was a jazz fusion group led by drummer Tony Williams. The band was pivotal in the development of fusion and featured various noteworthy jazz and rock musicians throughout its history, including guitarists John McLaughlin and Allan Holdsworth, keyboardists Larry Young and Alan Pasqua, and bassists Jack Bruce and Ron Carter.

== Original line-up ==
The Tony Williams Lifetime was founded in 1969 as a power trio with John McLaughlin on electric guitar and Larry Young on organ. The band was possibly named for Williams' debut album as a bandleader, Life Time, released on Blue Note in 1965. Its debut album was Emergency!, a double album released on Polydor/PolyGram Records in 1969. It was largely rejected by jazz listeners at the time of its release because of its heavy rock influences, but it is now looked upon as a fusion classic. Jack Bruce joined the group to provide bass and vocals on its second album, Turn It Over, released in 1970.

McLaughlin left the group and was replaced by Ted Dunbar on its 1971 album, Ego. This album also featured Ron Carter on bass and cello, Warren Smith and Don Alias on percussion, and Larry Young on organ. Lifetime gigs around this time featured Juini Booth on bass. This lineup's performance in France on August 7, 1971 (venue unknown) was filmed in color and broadcast on the French television program Pop2. Following Larry Young's departure from the band sometime after July 1972, Tony Williams was the only original member remaining.

Williams performed in August 1972 with a new short-lived trio called Life Time Experience, featuring bassist Stanley Clarke and violinist Jean Luc-Ponty. Their performance at the Festival de Chateauvallon, Chateauvallon, France, on August 23, 1972, was captured on film in black & white.

The fourth and last Lifetime album for Polydor/PolyGram, 1973's The Old Bum's Rush, was recorded in Boston and features entirely new personnel consisting of female vocalist and guitarist Linda/Laura 'Tequila' Logan (Williams' love interest at the time), Webster Lewis on organ & clavinet, David Horowitz on piano, vibes, and ARP synthesizer, and Herb Bushler on bass. Tony Williams' father Tillmon Williams makes a guest appearance on saxophone. Prior to recording, this lineup of the Lifetime, augmented by guitarist Bob Cacciola (or possibly Caccicola) performed material from the album on July 7, 1972, at the Newport Jazz Festival, Carnegie Hall, in New York. Marking yet another stylistic departure for the Lifetime and reinvention of the band's musical identity, the record is characterized by a predominantly sprightly and upbeat songwriting approach, electronic keyboard-dominated sound, and soul-jazz female vocals. Notably, keyboardist newcomer Webster Lewis turns in an organ performance which sounds remarkably like his predecessor Larry Young aka Khalid Yasin. Recorded by Williams under the dark cloud of knowing that Polydor would not be renewing his contract, the album received poor reviews and the group was effectively dissolved.

In 1974, Williams formed a new Lifetime featuring Bum's Rush holdovers Webster Lewis on keyboards and Linda/Laura 'Tequila' Logan on vocals, along with former Cream/Lifetime bassist Jack Bruce and British guitarist Allan Holdsworth. This lineup, sometimes referred to as Wildlife, recorded an album's worth of material at Europa Films Studios in Stockholm, Sweden in October 1974. This recording has never been officially released but circulates as a bootleg.

== The New Lifetime ==
In spring 1975, Williams put together a quartet he called The New Tony Williams Lifetime featuring bassist Tony Newton, pianist Alan Pasqua, and guitarist Allan Holdsworth. Prior to settling on Tony Newton as the choice for bass player, a number of bassists auditioned for the spot including Jaco Pastorius. This lineup recorded two albums for Columbia/CBS Records, Believe It in 1975 and Million Dollar Legs in 1976. These albums were reissued on one CD in 1992 as Lifetime: The Collection. After recording Million Dollar Legs, guitarist Allan Holdsworth departed and was replaced first by Larry Herzberg (in the summer of 1976) and then by Marlon Graves for the subsequent tour undertaken to support the album.

In 1977, Williams parted ways with Graves, Pasqua, and Newton and formed another Lifetime lineup with entirely new personnel consisting of Mike Hoffmann (lead guitar), Gerry Mule′ (second guitar), Paul Potyen (keyboards), and Michael Formanek (bass). This lineup recorded demos for the Columbia label but had no official releases and played a small number of live gigs performing material from Ego and the two New Lifetime albums Believe It and Million Dollar Legs.

In July 1978 Williams toured Japan with Ronnie Montrose (guitar), Brian Auger (keyboards), Mario Cipollina (bass) and special guest Billy Cobham also on drums for a series of concerts. They were billed as the Tony Williams All Stars. Later that year he released The Joy of Flying, an eclectic solo album featuring a mix of styles and collaborations with Herbie Hancock, Cecil Taylor, Tom Scott, Stanley Clarke, Michael Brecker, George Benson, and Jan Hammer. It also contains "Open Fire" recorded by the All Stars earlier that year.

In 1979, Williams formed another all-new Lifetime featuring Tod Carver (guitar), Bunny Brunel (bass), Bruce Harris (keyboards), and Tom Grant (keyboards). The band's sound was a major departure from the former New Lifetime's classic fusion, with the high-energy shredding heard on Believe It and Million Dollar Legs largely abandoned in favor of a cerebral and groove-laden approach that emphasized mood and melody over technical virtuosity. As with the 1977 band the 1979-era Lifetime played a small number of live gigs and no studio recordings are known to exist. Toward the end of this period Williams pared-down the lineup to a trio and played some gigs with Tom Grant on keyboards and Bunny Brunel on bass.

In late May 1980, Williams and a new trio incarnation of the Lifetime featuring Patrick O'Hearn on bass (miscredited as Patrick O'Hara) and Tom Grant on keyboards recorded the little-known Play or Die album for the Swiss label PS Productions. Stylistically, the recording found Williams returning to high energy keyboard-dominated instrumental fusion reminiscent of the 1975 album On the Mountain by Elvin Jones, Jan Hammer and Gene Perla.

At the time of his death Williams was writing and rehearsing with guitarist Lyle Workman (who had appeared on Williams' 1996 solo release Wilderness) to form yet another incarnation of the Lifetime.

== Legacy and tributes ==
At the time of its release, Emergency! was notably influential on the then-emerging genre of jazz fusion. It was also one of several albums that the members of The Allman Brothers Band listened to regularly early in their career.

John Zorn named the Tony Williams Lifetime as a specific musical inspiration in the liner notes of the Naked City album Radio.

British singer-songwriter Andy Partridge of XTC calls Emergency! his all-time favourite album, and says that hearing it in 1969, at the insistence of a friend, was a vital moment in expanding his musical tastes beyond conventional guitar pop and rock.

Since the death of Williams in 1997, Jack DeJohnette and John Scofield formed Trio Beyond with Larry Goldings in honour of the Tony Williams Lifetime. They released one album, Saudades (2006), on the German label ECM.

In 2006, former Lifetime members Allan Holdsworth and Alan Pasqua toured with drummer Chad Wackerman and bassist Jimmy Haslip performing a set comprising original as well as Lifetime material. Live at Yoshi's, a DVD from the U.S. leg of the tour, was released in 2007 and followed by the 2-CD set Blues for Tony in 2009.

In December 2008, guitarist Vernon Reid, organist John Medeski, drummer Cindy Blackman, and former Lifetime member Jack Bruce played a week of shows in Japan as the Tony Williams Lifetime Tribute Band, playing a set of 1969/70 Lifetime material. This was recorded in high-definition and shown on Japanese TV.

Cindy Blackman released a Lifetime tribute album titled Another Lifetime in 2010.

The Lifetime Tribute Band featuring Jack Bruce reformed in February 2011 to play a further ten shows in high-profile jazz clubs in North America. Unusually the dates have early & evening shows, something most rock musicians stopped doing at the beginning of the 1970s. Reaction to the 2011 U.S. shows was so positive that the band renamed themselves Spectrum Road, after a track on 1969's first Lifetime album. The group released a self-titled album in 2012 on the U.S. jazz record label Palmetto Records.

== Discography ==
- 1969: Emergency!
- 1970: Turn It Over
- 1971: Ego
- 1972: The Old Bum's Rush
- 1974: Wildlife a.k.a. The Stockholm Sessions (unreleased)
- 1975: Believe It
- 1976: Million Dollar Legs
- 1976: Live at The Village Gate (unofficial)
- 1978: The Joy of Flying
- 1980: Play or Die
- 1992: Lifetime: The Collection (compilation)
- 1997: Spectrum: The Anthology (compilation)

== See also ==
- Trio of Doom
