= Angel Street =

Angel Street may refer to:

- Angel Street (play), the American title of Gas Light, a 1938 play by the British dramatist Patrick Hamilton
- Angel Street (album), an album by the American musician Tony Williams
- Angel Street (TV series), an American crime drama television series
- Angel Street, London
