= V.S.O.P. (group) =

American jazz quintet (1976–1992)

V.S.O.P. was an American jazz quintet consisting of Herbie Hancock (piano, keyboards, synthesizers, and vocals), Wayne Shorter (tenor saxophone and soprano saxophone), Ron Carter (bass), Tony Williams (drums), and Freddie Hubbard (trumpet and flugelhorn). Hancock, Shorter, Carter, and Williams had all been members of Miles Davis' "Second Great Quintet" during the 1960s. The name V.S.O.P. is taken from a grade of Cognac brandy, where it signifies aged (and implicitly high quality) stock.

The group first came together at the 1976 Newport Jazz Festival to headline a Herbie Hancock retrospective concert, which featured the reunited Miles Davis Quintet (sans Davis, who had temporarily retired from music a year prior) alongside Hancock's contemporary fusion groups Mwandishi and the Headhunters. V.S.O.P. subsequently became a semi-regular touring band through the late 1970s, recording several live albums, but also released a studio album, Five Stars, in 1979. Allmusic's Richard Ginell suggested that the band's back-to-basics artistry helped lay the foundation for the 1980s post-bop and straight-ahead jazz revival.

== Discography ==
=== Studio albums ===
Title	Album details
Five Stars	Release date: 1979; Label: CBS/Sony

=== Live albums ===
Title	Album details	Peak chart positions	
Title	Album details	US	US Jazz (Trad)
The Quintet	Release date: 1977; Label: Columbia	123	3
Tempest in the Colosseum	Release date: 1977; Label: CBS/Sony	—	—
Live Under the Sky	Release date: 1979; Label: CBS/Sony, Columbia	—	—
Live Under the Sky, No. 2*	Release date: October 30, 2002; Label: Columbia/Legacy	—	—
"—" denotes releases that did not chart

*This release was only the second CD coupled with the re-release of Live Under The Sky when it was released in the USA, so it was brought back to Japan.

== See also ==
- VSOP (live album by Herbie Hancock)
