= Arc of the Testimony =

Studio album by Arcana
- Released: October 14, 1997
- Recorded: Greenpoint Studio, Brooklyn, New York
- Genre: Jazz fusion, free jazz
- Length: 53:27
- Label: Axiom/Island
- Producer: Bill Laswell, Tony Williams

Arcana chronology
The Last Wave (1996)	Arc of the Testimony (1997)

Arc of the Testimony is the second and final album by the American jazz fusion band Arcana. It was released on bassist Bill Laswell's Axiom label on October 14, 1997. Unlike the trio configuration on the first album, this project features a spacier, slightly less abstract form of fusion music. Bill Laswell and drummer Tony Williams composed and developed the music, and co-produced the album together.

Laswell invited a number of musicians to contribute, including legendary tenor saxophonist Pharoah Sanders. Other contributors included alto saxophonist Byard Lancaster, and electric guitarists Nicky Skopelitis and Buckethead. Tony Williams died suddenly on February 23, 1997, while this album was still in production, and thus it represents his last recorded work. Laswell's M.O.D. Reloaded label re-released this album in 2021 with a new track entitled "Black Money".

== Reception ==
Professional ratings
Review scores
Source	Rating
AllMusic	4.5/5 stars
Robert Christgau	A−
The Penguin Guide to Jazz Recordings	3.5/4 stars

In a review for AllMusic, Stephen Thomas Erlewine wrote: "Arc of the Testimony is a freewheeling, unpredictable blend of electronic and acoustic sounds... it finds a common ground between improvisation and post-production studio trickery. All of the musicians... are open-minded and help push the music forward, resulting in a thoroughly involving, challenging listen."

The authors of the Penguin Guide to Jazz Recordings stated: "As a memorial to Williams, this probably isn't as typical as some of the last albums with acoustic groups, but it serves as a forceful reminder of the immense power he was holding in check even when he was playing straight fours and quiet ballad figures."

== Track listing ==
All music is composed by Bill Laswell and Tony Williams.

No.	Title	Length
1.	"Gone Tomorrow"	9:39
2.	"Illuminator"	6:07
3.	"Into the Circle"	9:25
4.	"Returning"	4:29
5.	"Calling Out the Blue Light"	6:37
6.	"Circles of Hell"	7:15
7.	"Wheeless on a Dark River"	4:27
8.	"The Earth Below"	5:28
Total length:		53:27

== Personnel ==
Musicians

- Bill Laswell – bass guitar, synthesizer
- Tony Williams – drums
- Pharoah Sanders – tenor saxophone
- Nicky Skopelitis – guitar, oud
- Byard Lancaster – alto saxophone on "Gone Tomorrow", "Into the Circle", "Calling Out the Blue Light"
- Graham Haynes – cornet on "Gone Tomorrow" and "Into the Circle"
- Buckethead – guitar on "Illuminator", "Into the Circle", "Returning", "Circles of Hell" and "The Earth Below"

Production

- Bill Laswell – production
- Tony Williams – production
- Robert Musso – engineer
- Michael Fossenkemper – engineer (mastering)
- Oz Fritz – assistant engineer
- Russell Mills – artwork
- Michael Webster – design
