= Native Heart =

Studio album by Tony Williams
- Released: 1990
- Recorded: September 1989
- Studio: Power Station
- Genre: Jazz
- Label: Blue Note
- Producer: Tony Williams

Tony Williams chronology
Angel Street (1988)	Native Heart (1990)	The Story of Neptune (1992)

Native Heart is an album by the American musician Tony Williams, released in 1990. Williams supported the album with North American and UK tours. Native Heart peaked in the top five of Billboard's Top Jazz Albums chart.

== Production ==
Williams composed and arranged all of the album's songs. He was backed by pianist Mulgrew Miller, trumpeter Wallace Roney, bass players Bob Hurst and Ira Coleman, and saxophonist Bill Pierce. Williams had worked with Miller, Roney, and Pierce since returning to recording, in 1985. The quintet had rehearsed the songs many times before entering the studio; Williams also worked on them in his spare time. "Juicy Fruit" contains a snippet of "Watermelon Man". "Liberty" is a Williams solo track.

== Critical reception ==
Professional ratings
Review scores
Source	Rating
AllMusic	4/5 stars
El Paso Herald-Post	3.5/4 stars
Lincoln Journal Star	A−
Los Angeles Times	3/5 stars
The Philadelphia Inquirer	3.5/4 stars
The Rolling Stone Album Guide	3.5/5 stars
The Windsor Star	B+

The Chicago Tribune called the album a "swinging, if slightly emotionally detached recording." Spin considered it to be "one of the most reassuringly musical records to emerge from the hard-bop renaissance." The Gazette noted that "Williams writes long, intricate arrangements that—along with his tendency to bash the stuffing out of his drums—have tended to suffocate his young employees on past outings... Here, he still plays too loud too often, but everybody except Miller mounts an effective counterattack."

The Los Angeles Times concluded that "the title track's moody, rainy day flavor and the sassy but overextended blues strut of 'Juicy Fruit' are high spots on an album that's long on expert craftsmanship but a bit short on dynamic flair." The Windsor Star determined that "the Williams splash and verve are at the centre of all the music but it finally does not wholly free itself from its laid-back bounce." The Philadelphia Inquirer said that "the music has all the Zen-like peace of new-age without the mind-numbing sameness."

AllMusic deemed Native Heart "the more adventurous side of straight-ahead jazz."

== Track listing ==
No.	Title	Length
1.	"Native Heart"
2.	"City of Lights"
3.	"Extreme Measures"
4.	"Juicy Fruit"
5.	"Two Worlds"
6.	"Crystal Palace"
7.	"Liberty"
