= Herbie Hancock Trio (1982 album) =

Studio album by Herbie Hancock
- Released: 1981
- Recorded: 27 July 1981
- Genre: Jazz
- Label: Columbia
- Producer: David Rubinson

Herbie Hancock chronology
Magic Windows (1981)	Herbie Hancock Trio (1981)	Quartet (1982)

Professional ratings
Review scores
Source	Rating
AllMusic	3.5/5 stars

Herbie Hancock Trio (with bassist Ron Carter & drummer Tony Williams) is the twenty-sixth album and the second of the same name by Herbie Hancock. (The first one was released in 1977; this one was released in 1982).

== Track listing ==
1. "Stable Mates" (Benny Golson) – 11:05
2. "Dolphin Dance" (Hancock) – 10:18
3. "A Slight Smile" (Carter) – 9:03
4. "That Old Black Magic" (Harold Arlen, Johnny Mercer) – 8:33
5. "La Maison Goree" – (Williams) – 6:41

== Personnel ==
- Herbie Hancock – piano
- Ron Carter – bass
- Tony Williams – drums
