= Angel Street (album) =

Studio album by Tony Williams
- Released: 1988
- Genre: Jazz
- Length: 45:01
- Label: Blue Note
- Producer: Tony Williams, Jason Corsaro

Tony Williams chronology
Civilization (1987)	Angel Street (1988)	Native Heart (1990)

Angel Street is an album by the American musician Tony Williams, released in 1988. He and his group supported the album with a North American tour.

== Production ==
All of the songs were written by Williams, who had spent the early 1980s working on his composition skills. He was backed by Billy Pierce on saxophone, Charnett Moffett on bass, Wallace Roney on trumpet, and Mulgrew Miller on piano. "Pee Wee" was recorded by Williams's former bandleader, Miles Davis. Williams thought that his compositional abilities were stronger on Angel Street, and that he possessed a better sense of melody. He preferred that the group record only two or three takes of a track. Williams used a personalized drum machine to help him construct the songs; he included short drum solos between the tracks.

== Critical reception ==
Professional ratings
Review scores
Source	Rating
MusicHound Jazz: The Essential Album Guide	2.5/5 stars
The Penguin Guide to Jazz on CD, LP & Cassette	3/4 stars
The Rolling Stone Album Guide	3/5 stars
The Windsor Star	A−

The St. Petersburg Times concluded that "Williams is unquestionably an expert and innovative drummer, but his composing skills—a recent concentration—are shaky... Most of the tunes ... are fuzzy and obtuse." The New York Times noted that "the music is easygoing, even at fast tempos; Mr. Williams knocks the tunes around with carefree mastery, but too often he allows his soloists ... to reel off the steady strings of 16th-notes and arpeggios that are hard-bop's common currency." The Los Angeles Times said that "the music, composed by Williams, is powered by his crisp stick work: rapidly shifting layers of rhythms coming from carefully tuned drums that almost give his playing a melodic quality."

The Windsor Star stated that the "group kicks and swings healthily ... on uptempo outings like 'Obsession' and 'Red Mask'". The Globe and Mail opined that "the ballads sound like most quintet's ballads—his musicians play them in a way that falls halfway between the dutiful and the inspired—but the heavy slugging, with Moffett as bullish as his leader, could only be the work of Tony Williams." The Times praised Williams's "breathtakingly sophisticated rhythmic and textural detail".

== Track listing ==
Angel Street track listing
No.	Title	Length
1.	"Angel Street"	8:20
2.	"Touch Me"	1:23
3.	"Red Mask"	7:08
4.	"Kiss Me"	0:54
5.	"Dreamland"	9:36
6.	"Only with You"	5:56
7.	"Pee Wee"	6:39
8.	"Thrill Me"	0:46
9.	"Obsession"	4:19
Total length:		45:01
