= Herbie Hancock Trio (1977 album) =

Studio album by Herbie Hancock
- Released: September 21, 1977
- Recorded: July 13, 1977
- Studio: The Automatt, San Francisco
- Genre: Jazz
- Length: 46:13
- Label: CBS/Sony 25AP-650
- Producer: David Rubinson

Herbie Hancock chronology
| VSOP (1977) | Herbie Hancock Trio (1977) | The Quintet (1977) |

Professional ratings
Review scores
| Source | Rating |
|---|---|
| AllMusic | 4/5 stars |

Herbie Hancock Trio is an album by Herbie Hancock released on September 21, 1977, in Japan. It includes performances with bassist Ron Carter and drummer Tony Williams. A second selection of six tracks recorded by the trio during the same day's sessions was released under Ron Carter's name as Third Plane.

This is the first of two albums with the same title. A second Herbie Hancock Trio with the same personnel was released in 1982.

== Track listing ==
1. "Watch It" – 12:25
2. "Speak Like a Child" – 13:06
3. "Watcha Waitin' For" – 6:20
4. "Look" – 7:42
5. "Milestones" (Miles Davis) – 6:40

All compositions by Herbie Hancock, except as indicated.

== Personnel ==
Musicians

- Herbie Hancock – piano
- Ron Carter – bass
- Tony Williams – drums

Production

- David Rubinson – producer
- Fred Catero – engineer
- Bryan Bell – technical assistance
- Kevin Ayres – technical assistance
- Akio Nimbari – art direction, design
- Ikuo Niida – artwork
- Osamu Konno – photography
