= Denen Coliseum =

Tennis venue located in Ōta, Tokyo, Japan

Coordinates: 35.594736°N 139.668243°E

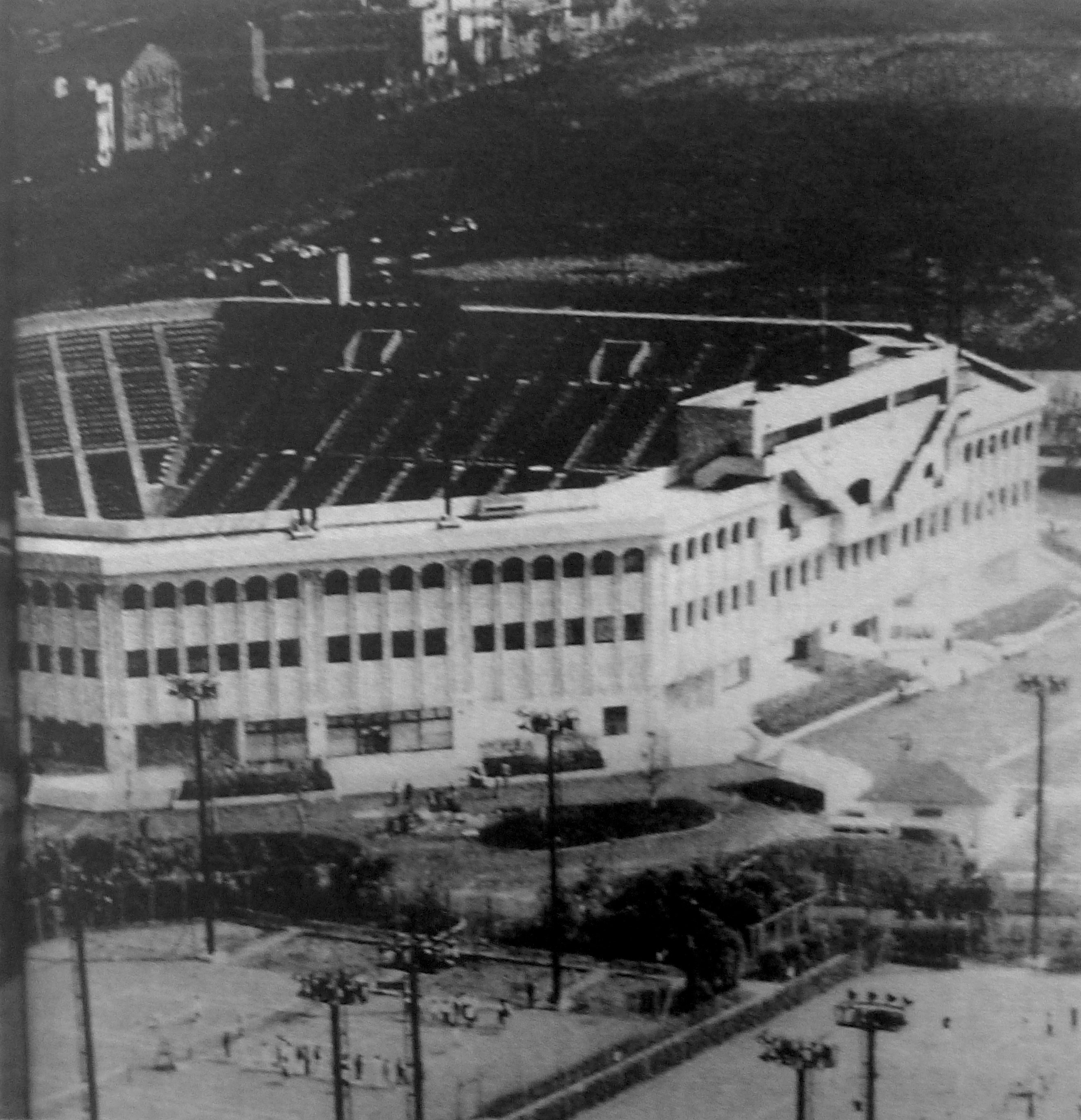
- Interactive map of Denen Coliseum
- Location: Ota, Tokyo, Japan
- Owner: Denen Tennis Club
- Capacity: 10,000
- Surface: Clay

Construction
- Opened: 1936
- Closed: 1989
- Cost: $ ? million

Tenant
- Japan Open Tennis Championships (1972-1986)

Denen Coliseum (田園コロシアム, Den'en Koroshiamu) was an outdoor tennis venue located in Ōta, Tokyo, Japan. It had a capacity of 10,000 people.
