= Jazz fusion =

Music genre combining jazz methods with rock music, funk, and rhythm and blues

- Other names: Jazz rock; jazz-rock fusion; fusion
- Stylistic origins: Jazz; rock; funk; jam sessions; psychedelia; cool jazz; bebop
- Cultural origins: Late 1960s, United States
- Derivative forms: Zeuhl; smooth jazz; acid jazz; quiet storm; urban contemporary; nu jazz

Other topics
- List of musicians

Jazz fusion (also known as jazz rock, jazz-rock fusion, or simply fusion) is a popular music genre that developed in the late 1960s when musicians combined jazz harmony and improvisation with rock music, funk, and rhythm and blues. Electric guitars and basses, amplifiers, and keyboard instruments (including electric pianos and organs) that were popular in rock began to be used by jazz musicians, particularly those who had grown up listening to rock and roll.

Jazz fusion arrangements vary in complexity. Some employ groove-based vamps fixed to a single key or a single chord with a simple, repeated melody. Others use elaborate chord progressions, unconventional time signatures, or melodies with counter-melodies, in a similar fashion to progressive rock. These arrangements, whether simple or complex, typically include improvised sections that can vary in length, much like in other forms of jazz.

As with jazz, jazz fusion can employ brass and woodwind instruments such as trumpet and saxophone, but other instruments often substitute for these. A jazz fusion band is less likely to use acoustic piano and double bass, and more likely to use electric guitars, electric pianos, organs, synthesizers, and bass guitar.

The term "jazz rock" is sometimes used as a synonym for "jazz fusion" and for music performed by late 1960s- and 1970s-era rock bands that added jazz elements to their music. After a decade of popularity during the 1970s, fusion expanded its improvisatory and experimental approaches through the 1980s in parallel with the development of a radio-friendly style called smooth jazz. Experimentation continued in the 1990s and 2000s. Fusion albums, even those that are made by the same group or artist, may include a variety of musical styles. Rather than being a codified musical style, fusion can be viewed as a musical tradition or approach.

== History ==
=== Origins ===
When John Coltrane died in 1967, rock was the most popular music in America, and DownBeat magazine went so far as to declare in a headline that: "Jazz as We Know It Is Dead". AllMusic states that "until around 1967, the worlds of jazz and rock were nearly completely separate", although the Daevid Allen Trio which later became the Soft Machine formed in 1963, while the jazz label Verve released the influential debut album, Freak Out!, by artist and composer Frank Zappa in 1966.

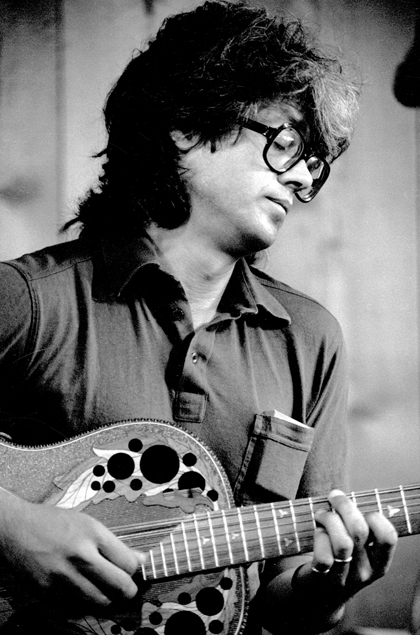
Guitarist Larry Coryell

Guitarist Larry Coryell, sometimes called the godfather of fusion, referred to a generation of musicians who had grown up on rock and roll when he said, "We loved Miles but we also loved the Rolling Stones." In 1966, he started the band the Free Spirits with Bob Moses on drums and recorded the band's first album, Out of Sight and Sound, released in 1967. That same year, DownBeat began to report on rock music. After the Free Spirits, Coryell was part of a quartet led by vibraphonist Gary Burton, releasing the album Duster with its rock guitar influence. Burton produced the album Tomorrow Never Knows for Count's Jam Band, which included Coryell, Mike Nock, and Steve Marcus, all of them former students at Berklee College in Boston.

The pioneers of fusion emphasized exploration, energy, electricity, intensity, virtuosity, and volume. Charles Lloyd played a combination of rock and jazz at the Monterey Jazz Festival in 1966 with a quartet that included Keith Jarrett and Jack DeJohnette. Lloyd adopted the trappings of the California psychedelic rock scene by playing at the rock venue the Fillmore West, wearing colorful clothes, and giving his albums titles like Dream Weaver and Forest Flower, which were bestselling jazz albums in 1967. Flautist Jeremy Steig experimented with jazz in his band Jeremy & the Satyrs with vibraphonist Mike Mainieri. Rahsaan Roland Kirk performed with Jimi Hendrix at Ronnie Scott's Jazz Club in London.

According to music journalist Zaid Mudhaffer, the term "jazz fusion" was coined in a review of Song of Innocence by David Axelrod when it was released in 1968. Axelrod said Davis had played the album before conceiving Bitches Brew.

=== Miles Davis ===
Miles Davis wrote in his autobiography that in 1968 and 1969, he had been listening to Jimi Hendrix, James Brown, and Sly and the Family Stone. As members of Davis' band, Chick Corea and Herbie Hancock played electric piano on Filles de Kilimanjaro. Davis's 1969 album In a Silent Way is considered his first fusion album. Composed of two side-long improvised suites edited heavily by Teo Macero, the album was made by pioneers of jazz fusion: Corea, Hancock, Tony Williams, Wayne Shorter, Joe Zawinul and John McLaughlin. When Davis recorded Bitches Brew in 1969, he mostly abandoned the swing beat in favor of a rock and roll backbeat and bass guitar grooves. The album "mixed free jazz blowing by a large ensemble with electronic keyboards and guitar, plus a dense mix of percussion". Davis played his trumpet like an electric guitar—plugged in to electronic effects and pedals. By the end of the first year, Bitches Brew sold 400,000 copies, four times the average for a Miles Davis album.

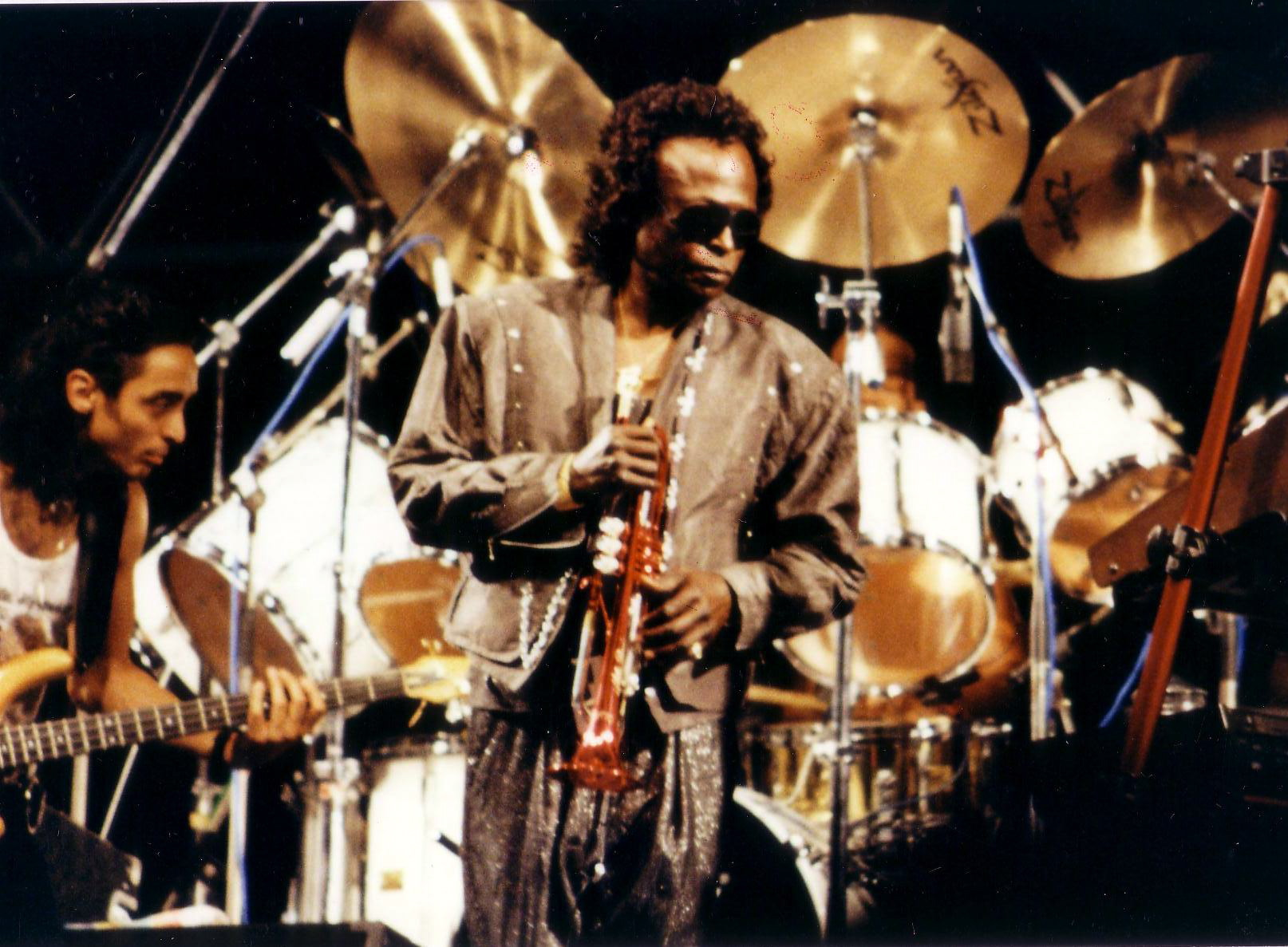
Trumpet player Miles Davis was a key figure in the development of fusion.

Although Bitches Brew gave him a gold record, the use of electric instruments and rock beats created consternation among some jazz critics, who accused Davis of betraying the essence of jazz. Music critic Kevin Fellezs commented that some members of the jazz community regarded rock music as less sophisticated and more commercial than jazz. Over the next two years, Davis recorded more often, worked with many sidemen, appeared on television, and performed at rock venues, continuing to experiment with rock, funk, and electronic treatments. His producer, Teo Macero, inserted previously recorded material into the Jack Johnson soundtrack, Live-Evil, and On the Corner. Jack Johnson (1971) has been cited as "the purest electric jazz record ever made" and "one of the most remarkable jazz rock discs of the era".

=== Other musicians ===
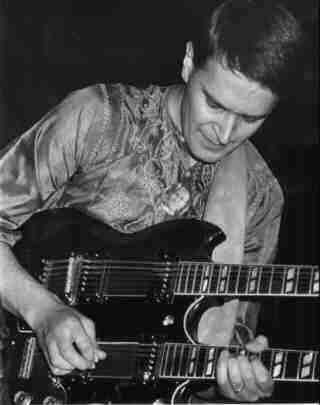
John McLaughlin performs during his Mahavishnu Orchestra period

Herbie Hancock brought elements of funk, disco, and electronic music into commercially successful albums such as Head Hunters (1973) and Feets, Don't Fail Me Now (1979). Several years after recording Miles in the Sky with Davis, guitarist George Benson became a vocalist with enough pop hits to overshadow his earlier career in jazz.

While Davis was sidelined, Chick Corea gained prominence. In the early 1970s Corea combined jazz, rock, pop, and Brazilian music in Return to Forever, a band that included Stanley Clarke on bass guitar and Al Di Meola on electric guitar. Corea divided the rest of his career between acoustic and electric music, non-commercial and commercial, jazz and pop rock, with a band for each: the Akoustic Band and the Elektric Band.

Joe Zawinul and Wayne Shorter started the influential jazz fusion band Weather Report in December 1970. They had a successful career along with major musicians like Alphonse Mouzon, Jaco Pastorius, Airto Moreira and Miroslav Vitouš until 1986.

Tony Williams was a member of Davis's band since 1963. Williams reflected, "I wanted to create a different atmosphere from the one I had been in...What better way to do it than to go electric?" He left Davis to form the Tony Williams Lifetime with English guitarist John McLaughlin and organist Larry Young. The band combined rock intensity and loudness with jazz spontaneity. The debut album Emergency! was recorded three months before Bitches Brew.

Although McLaughlin had worked with Miles Davis, he was influenced more by Jimi Hendrix and had played with English rock musicians Eric Clapton and Mick Jagger before creating the Mahavishnu Orchestra around the same time that Corea started Return to Forever. He brought to his music many of the elements that interested other musicians in the 1960s and early 1970s: counterculture, rock and roll, electronic instruments, solo virtuosity, experimentation, the blending of genres, and an interest in the exotic, such as Indian music. He formed the Mahavishnu Orchestra with drummer Billy Cobham, violinist Jerry Goodman, bassist Rick Laird, and keyboardist Jan Hammer. The band released its first album, The Inner Mounting Flame, in 1971. Hammer pioneered the use of the Minimoog synthesizer with distortion effects. His use of the pitch bend wheel made a keyboard sound like an electric guitar. The Mahavishnu Orchestra was influenced by both psychedelic rock and Indian classical music. The band's first lineup broke up after two studio albums and one live album, but McLaughlin formed another group in 1974 under the same name with jazz violinist Jean-Luc Ponty, one of the first electric violinists.

After leaving the Mahavishnu Orchestra in 1975 Jean-Luc Ponty signed with Atlantic and released number of successful jazz fusion solo albums that entered top 5 of the Billboard jazz charts in mid '70s — '80s.

During the late 1970s, Lee Ritenour, Stuff, George Benson, Chuck Mangione, Spyro Gyra, the Crusaders, and Larry Carlton released fusion albums. Early 1980s, Larsen Feiten band, George Benson, Lee Ritenour, Al Jarreau, and the Clark/Duke Project gained pop hits.

== Jazz rock ==
Jazz rock
- Stylistic origins: Jazz; rock; jazz fusion
- Typical instruments: Electric guitar; piano; electric piano; drums; saxophone; trumpet; electronic keyboard; bass guitar; vocals
- Derivative forms: Jam band; punk jazz; jazz metal; progressive rock; krautrock; yacht rock

The term "jazz rock" (or "jazz/rock") is sometimes used as a synonym for "jazz fusion". The Free Spirits have sometimes been cited as the earliest jazz rock band.

Jazz rock bands such as Chicago, the Ides of March, Blood, Sweat & Tears, Chase, Lighthouse, Santana, Colosseum, Soft Machine, Nucleus, Brand X, the Mothers of Invention and IF blended jazz and rock with electric instruments. Miles Davis' fusion jazz was "pure melody and tonal color", while Frank Zappa's music was more "complex" and "unpredictable". Zappa released the solo album Hot Rats in 1969. The album contained long instrumental pieces with a jazz influence. Zappa released two albums, Waka/Jawaka and The Grand Wazoo, in 1972, which were influenced by jazz. George Duke and Aynsley Dunbar played on both. 1970s band Steely Dan has been lauded by music critic Neil McCormick for their "smooth, smart jazz-rock fusion".

The jazz artists of the 1960s and 1970s had a large impact on many rock groups of that era such as Santana and Frank Zappa. They took jazz phrasing and harmony and incorporated it into modern rock music, significantly changing music history and paving the way for artists that would follow in their footsteps. Carlos Santana in particular has given much credit to Miles Davis and the influence he had on his music. While Miles Davis combined jazz with modal and rock influences, Carlos Santana combined these along with Latin rhythms and feel, shaping a whole new genre, Latin rock.

According to AllMusic, the term jazz rock "may refer to the loudest, wildest, most electrified fusion bands from the jazz camp, but most often it describes performers coming from the rock side of the equation...jazz rock first emerged during the late '60s as an attempt to fuse the visceral power of rock with the musical complexity and improvisational fireworks of jazz. Since rock often emphasized directness and simplicity over virtuosity, jazz rock generally grew out of the most artistically ambitious rock subgenres of the late '60s and early '70s: psychedelia, progressive rock, and the singer-songwriter movement."

According to jazz writer Stuart Nicholson, jazz rock paralleled free jazz by being "on the verge of creating a whole new musical language in the 1960s". He said the albums Emergency! (1969) by the Tony Williams Lifetime and Agharta (1975) by Miles Davis "suggested the potential of evolving into something that might eventually define itself as a wholly independent genre quite apart from the sound and conventions of anything that had gone before". This development was stifled by commercialism, Nicholson said, as the genre "mutated into a peculiar species of jazz-inflected pop music that eventually took up residence on FM radio" at the end of the 1970s.

In the 1970s, American fusion was being combined in the U.K. with progressive rock and psychedelic music. Bands who were part of this movement included Brand X (with Phil Collins of Genesis), Bruford (Bill Bruford of Yes), and Nucleus (led by Ian Carr). Throughout Europe and the world this movement grew due to the efforts of Magma in France, Passport in Germany, guitarist Jan Akkerman of the Netherlands, Terje Rypdal in Norway, Jukka Tolonen of Finland, and the Japanese guitarists Ryo Kawasaki and Kazumi Watanabe.

== Jazz metal ==
Jazz metal
- Stylistic origins: Heavy metal; jazz fusion; free jazz
- Typical instruments: Electric guitar; piano; electric piano; drums; saxophone; trumpet; electronic keyboard; bass guitar; vocals

Other topics
- Mathcore; progressive metal; punk jazz; jazzcore

Jazz metal is the fusion of jazz fusion and jazz rock with heavy metal. Animals as Leaders' albums The Joy of Motion (2014) and The Madness of Many (2016) have been described as progressive metal combined with jazz fusion. Panzerballett blends jazz with heavy metal. Imperial Triumphant combines jazz with death metal and black metal.

== Jazz pop ==
Jazz-pop
- Stylistic origins: Vocal jazz; traditional pop; swing; rhythm and blues; soul; bossa nova; latin jazz; easy listening; lounge music
- Cultural origins: 1960s, United States
- Derivative forms: Smooth jazz

Jazz pop (or pop-jazz, also called jazzy pop) is music with jazz instruments and soft production that is commercially viable and radio-friendly. In jazz pop, the music has less improvisation, but retains the melody and swing of jazz. Robert Palmer from The New York Times cited that jazz pop should be distinguished from jazz rock.

Examples of jazz-pop musicians are Kenny G, Bob James, and George Benson. Frank Sinatra has been referred to as a vocalist whose style blended jazz influences with traditional pop and crooning. A more recent example of a vocalist described as jazz-pop is Laufey.

== Smooth jazz ==
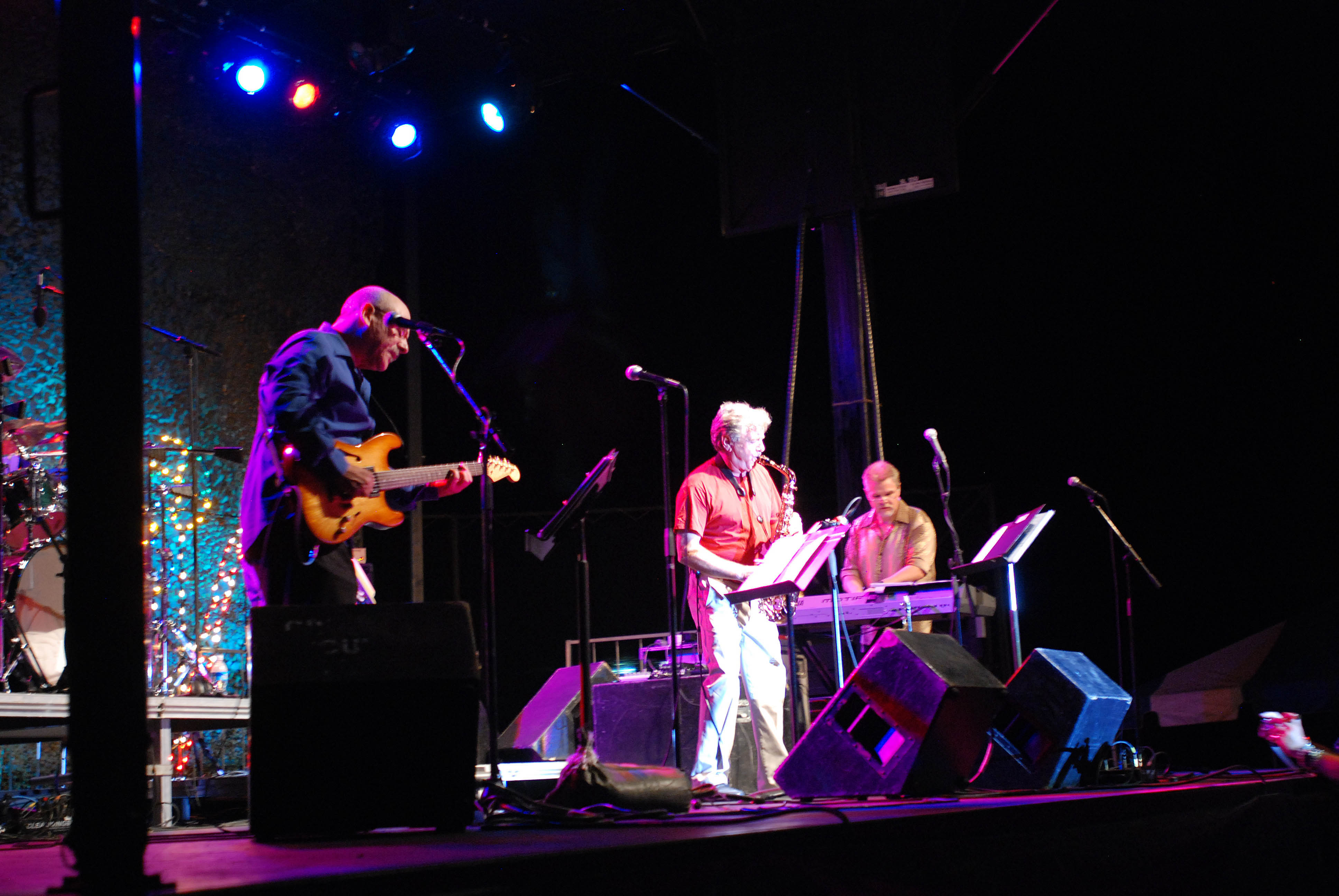
Spyro Gyra combines jazz with R&B, funk and pop.

By the early 1980s, much of the original fusion genre was subsumed into other branches of jazz and rock, especially smooth jazz, a radio-friendly subgenre of fusion which is influenced by R&B, funk, and pop music. Smooth jazz can be traced to at least the late 1960s, when producer Creed Taylor worked with guitarist Wes Montgomery on three popular music-oriented albums. Taylor founded CTI Records and many established jazz performers recorded for CTI, including Freddie Hubbard, Chet Baker, George Benson, and Stanley Turrentine. Albums under Taylor's guidance were aimed at both pop and jazz fans.

The merging of jazz and pop/rock music took a more commercial direction in the late 1970s and early 1980s, in the form of compositions with a softer sound palette that could fit comfortably in a soft rock radio playlist. The AllMusic guide's article on fusion states that "unfortunately, as it became a money-maker and as rock declined artistically from the mid-'70s on, much of what was labeled fusion was actually a combination of jazz with easy-listening pop music and lightweight R&B."

Michael and Randy Brecker produced funk-influenced jazz with soloists. David Sanborn was considered a "soulful" and "influential" voice. However, Kenny G was criticized by both fusion and jazz fans, and some musicians, while having become a huge commercial success. Music reviewer George Graham argues that the "so-called 'smooth jazz' sound of people like Kenny G has none of the fire and creativity that marked the best of the fusion scene during its heyday in the 1970s."

== Other styles ==
=== Punk jazz ===
In the 1990s, another kind of fusion took a more hardcore approach. Bill Laswell produced many albums in this movement, such as Ask the Ages by avant-garde guitarist Sonny Sharrock and Arc of the Testimony with Laswell's band Arcana. Niacin was formed by rock bassist Billy Sheehan, drummer Dennis Chambers, and organist John Novello.

In London, The Pop Group began to mix free jazz and reggae into their form of punk rock. In New York City, no wave was inspired by free jazz and punk. Examples of this style include Lydia Lunch's Queen of Siam, James Chance and the Contortions, who mixed soul music with free jazz and punk rock, and the Lounge Lizards, the first group to call themselves punk jazz.

John Zorn took note of the emphasis on speed and dissonance that was becoming prevalent in punk rock and incorporated them into free jazz with the release of the Spy vs Spy album in 1986. The album was a collection of Ornette Coleman tunes played in the thrashcore style. In the same year, Sonny Sharrock, Peter Brötzmann, Bill Laswell, and Ronald Shannon Jackson recorded the first album under the name Last Exit, a blend of thrash and free jazz.

=== Jazz-funk ===
Jazz-funk is characterized by a strong back beat (groove), electrified sounds, and an early prevalence of analog synthesizers. The integration of funk, soul, and R&B music and styles into jazz resulted in the creation of a genre whose spectrum is quite wide and ranges from strong jazz improvisation to soul, funk or disco with jazz arrangements, jazz riffs, jazz solos, and sometimes soul vocals.

Jazz-funk is primarily an American genre, where it was popular throughout the 1970s and the early 1980s, but it also achieved noted appeal on the club-circuit in England during the mid-1970s. Jazz-funk retains a stronger feel of groove and R&B versus some of the jazz fusion production, and is more arranged and features more improvisation than soul jazz.

=== M-Base ===
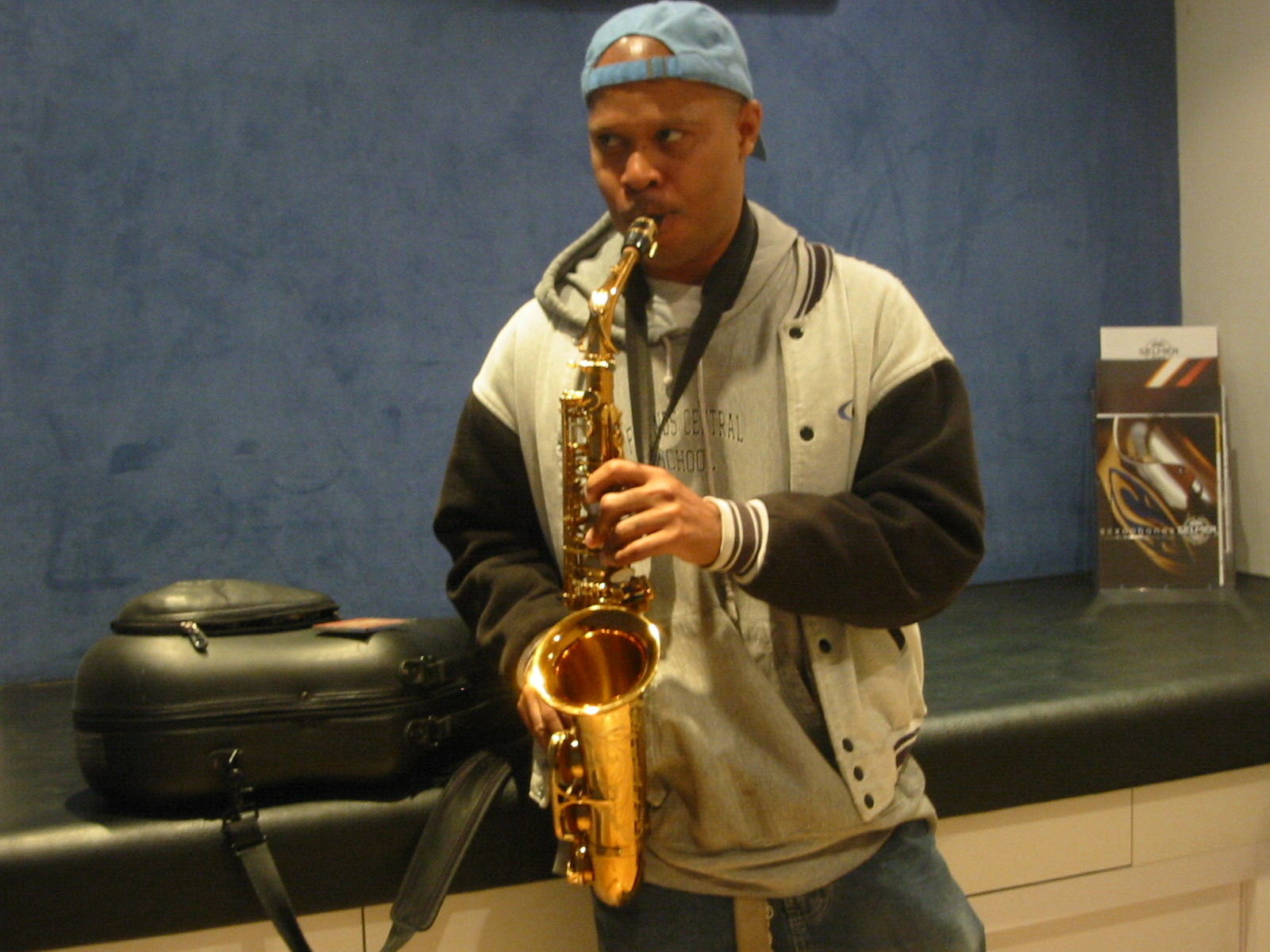
Steve Coleman in Paris, July 2004

M-Base ("macro-basic array of structured extemporization") centers on a movement started in the 1980s. It started as a group of young African-American musicians in New York which included Steve Coleman, Greg Osby, and Gary Thomas developing a complex but grooving sound. In the 1990s most M-Base participants turned to more conventional music, but Coleman, the most active participant, continued developing his music in accordance with the M-Base concept. M-Base changed from a loose collective to an informal "school".

=== Afro-Cuban jazz ===
Afro-Cuban jazz, one of the earliest forms of Latin jazz, is a fusion of Afro-Cuban clave-based rhythms with jazz harmonies and techniques of improvisation. Afro-Cuban jazz emerged in the early 1940s with the Cuban musicians Mario Bauza and Frank Grillo "Machito" in the band Machito and his Afro-Cubans in New York City. In 1947 the collaborations of bebop innovator Dizzy Gillespie with Cuban percussionist Chano Pozo brought Afro-Cuban rhythms and instruments, most notably the congas and the bongos, into the East Coast jazz scene. Early combinations of jazz with Cuban music, such as Gillespie's and Pozo's "Manteca" and Charlie Parker's and Machito's "Mangó Mangüé", were commonly referred to as "Cubop", short for Cuban bebop. During its first decades, the Afro-Cuban jazz movement was stronger in the United States than in Cuba.

== Influence on rock music ==
According to bassist Randy Jackson, jazz fusion is a difficult genre to play. "[I] picked jazz fusion because I was trying to become the ultimate technical musician—able to play anything. Jazz fusion to me is the hardest music to play. You have to be so proficient on your instrument. Playing five tempos at the same time, for instance. I wanted to try the toughest music because I knew if I could do that, I could do anything."

Progressive rock, with its affinity for long solos, diverse influences, non-standard time signatures, and complex music had very similar musical values as jazz fusion. Some prominent examples of progressive rock mixed with elements of fusion is the music of Gong, King Crimson, Ozric Tentacles, and Emerson, Lake & Palmer,PLJ Band

Jazz rock fusion's technically challenging guitar solos, bass solos, and odd-metered, syncopated drumming started to be incorporated in the technically focused progressive metal genre by the late 1980s. Watchtower's 1989 album Control and Resistance is one of the earliest progressive/thrash metal albums to experiment with a jazz fusion-influenced sound. The death metal band Atheist produced albums Unquestionable Presence in 1991 and Elements in 1993 containing heavily syncopated drumming, changing time signatures, instrumental parts, acoustic interludes, and Latin rhythms. Meshuggah first attracted international attention with the 1995 release Destroy Erase Improve for its fusion of fast-tempo death metal, thrash metal, and progressive metal with jazz fusion elements. Cynic recorded a complex, unorthodox form of jazz fusion influenced experimental death metal with their 1993 album Focus. In 1997, Guitar Institute of Technology guitarist Jennifer Batten under the name of Jennifer Batten's Tribal Rage: Momentum released Momentum—an instrumental hybrid of rock, fusion, and exotic sounds. Mudvayne is heavily influenced by jazz, especially in bassist Ryan Martinie's playing. Puya frequently incorporates influences from American and Latin jazz music.

Another, more cerebral, all-instrumental progressive jazz fusion-metal band Planet X released Universe in 2000 with Tony MacAlpine, Derek Sherinian (ex-Dream Theater), and Virgil Donati (who has played with Scott Henderson from Tribal Tech). The band blends fusion-style guitar solos and syncopated odd-metered drumming with the heaviness of metal. Tech-prog-fusion metal band Aghora formed in 1995 and released their first album, self-titled Aghora, recorded in 1999 with Sean Malone and Sean Reinert, both former members of Cynic. Gordian Knot, another Cynic-linked experimental progressive metal band, released its debut album in 1999 which explored a range of styles from jazz fusion to metal. The Mars Volta is extremely influenced by jazz fusion, using progressive, unexpected turns in the drum patterns and instrumental lines.

== See also ==
- List of jazz fusion musicians
- Jazz fusion ensembles
- Progressive soul
