= Level 42 discography =

- Studio albums: 11
- Extended plays: 2
- Live albums: 12
- Compilation albums: 23
- Singles: 37
- Video albums: 14
- Music videos: 22
- Box sets: 7

English jazz-funk band Level 42 has released 11 studio albums. The group has one Top 10 hit on the US Billboard Hot 100 chart ("Something About You") and six top 10s on the British UK Singles Chart ("The Sun Goes Down (Living It Up)", "Something About You", "Lessons in Love", "Running in the Family", "To Be with You Again", and "It's Over") and 20 top 40 U.K. hits. In Canada, it achieved two platinum albums and two gold singles ("Something About You" and "Lessons in Love"). Level 42 has sold 31 million units worldwide.

== Albums ==
=== Studio albums ===
Title	Album details	Peak chart positions										Certifications
Title	Album details	UK	AUT	CAN	GER	NL	NOR	NZ	SWE	SWI	US	Certifications
Level 42	Released: August 1981; Label: Polydor; Formats: LP, MC	20	—	—	—	4	—	—	43	—	—	UK: Silver; NL: Gold
Strategy / The Early Tapes (July/Aug 1980)	Released: March 1982; Label: Polydor; Formats: LP, MC	70	—	—	—	—	—	—	—	—	—	
The Pursuit of Accidents	Released: September 1982; Label: Polydor; Formats: LP, MC	17	—	—	—	24	31	—	—	—	—	UK: Silver
Standing in the Light	Released: 26 August 1983; Label: Polydor; Formats: LP, MC	9	—	—	27	34	—	—	25	—	—	UK: Gold
True Colours	Released: 5 October 1984; Label: Polydor; Formats: CD, LP, MC	14	—	—	23	9	—	17	29	14	—	UK: Silver
World Machine	Released: 18 October 1985; Label: Polydor; Formats: CD, LP, MC	3	14	15	12	4	39	18	21	14	18	UK: 2× Platinum; CAN: Platinum
Running in the Family	Released: 16 March 1987; Label: Polydor; Formats: CD, LP, MC	2	4	6	4	3	4	6	6	4	23	UK: 2× Platinum; CAN: Platinum; GER: Gold; NL: Platinum; NZ: Gold; SWI: Gold
Staring at the Sun	Released: 19 September 1988; Label: Polydor; Formats: CD, LP, MC	2	21	34	8	1	5	—	10	6	128	UK: Gold; CAN: Gold; NL: Gold
Guaranteed	Released: 2 September 1991; Label: RCA; Formats: CD, LP, MC	3	—	—	—	10	—	—	39	31	—	UK: Silver
Forever Now	Released: 14 March 1994; Label: RCA; Formats: CD, MC	8	—	—	—	30	—	—	—	—	—	
Retroglide	Released: 18 September 2006; Label: W14 Music; Formats: CD, MC, digital download	78	—	—	—	92	—	—	—	—	—	
"—" denotes releases that did not chart or were not released in that territory.

=== Live albums ===
Title	Album details	Peak chart positions			
Title	Album details	UK	GER	NL	SWI
A Physical Presence	Released: 28 June 1985; Label: Polydor; Formats: CD, 2xLP, MC	28	45	32	21
Live at Wembley	Released: 22 April 1996; Label: World Famous; Formats: CD, MC	—	—	—	—
Live 2001 Reading UK	Released: 2001; Label: Mark King; Formats: CD	—	—	—	—
Live at the Apollo, London	Released: 2004; Label: Mark King; Formats: CD	—	—	—	—
Greatest Hits Live Tour	Released: 2005; Label: Time Music International; Formats: CD	—	—	—	—
The River Sessions	Released: May 2005; Label: River; Formats: 2xCD	—	—	—	—
The Retroglide Tour	Released: 2007; Label: Summerhouse; Formats: 2xCD	—	—	—	—
Live in Holland 2009	Released: 2009; Label: Mark King; Formats: 2xCD	—	—	—	—
Live from Metropolis Studio	Released: 16 September 2013; Label: Edsel; Formats: CD+DVD	—	—	—	—
Live – 30th Anniversary Concert	Released: 18 May 2015; Label: Wienerworld Presentation; Formats: CD+DVD	—	—	—	—
Sirens Tour Live	Released: 2015; Label: Level 42; Formats: 2xCD+DVD	—	—	—	—
Another Level	Released: 25 July 2017; Label: The Music Company Europe; Formats: digital download	—	—	—	—
"—" denotes releases that did not chart or were not released in that territory.

=== Compilation albums ===
Title	Album details	Peak chart positions				Certifications
Title	Album details	UK	CAN	GER	NL	Certifications
The Family Edition	Released: 1987; Label: Polydor; Formats: LP, MC; Canada-only release	—	—	—	—	
On the Level	Released: 1989; Label: Pickwick Music; Formats: CD, MC	—	—	—	—	
Level Best	Released: 6 November 1989; Label: Polydor; Formats: CD, LP, MC	5	88	44	5	UK: Platinum; NL: Gold
The Remixes	Released: 20 July 1992; Label: Polydor; Formats: CD, 2xLP, MC	—	—	—	—	
On a Level	Released: 1993; Label: Spectrum Music; Formats: CD, MC	—	—	—	—	
Turn It On	Released: 18 March 1996; Label: Spectrum Music; Formats: CD, MC	—	—	—	—	
The Remix Collection	Released: June 1996; Label: Connoisseur Collection; Formats: CD	—	—	—	—	
The Very Best of Level 42	Released: 26 October 1998; Label: Polydor; Formats: CD, MC	41	—	—	—	UK: Gold
Classic Level 42	Released: 1999; Label: Polydor; Formats: CD	—	—	—	—	
The Ultimate Collection	Released: November 2002; Label: Polydor; Formats: 2xCD, 2xMC	—	—	—	—	
The Collection	Released: May 2003; Label: Spectrum Music; Formats: CD, MC	—	—	—	—	
Gold	Released: 29 August 2005; Label: Polydor; Formats: 2xCD	—	—	—	—	
The Definitive Collection	Released: 12 June 2006; Label: Polydor; Formats: CD, digital download	20	—	—	—	UK: Gold
Weave Your Spell: The Collection	Released: April 2007; Label: Spectrum Music/Universal; Formats: 2xCD	—	—	—	—	
Past Lives – The Best of the RCA Years	Released: 9 July 2007; Label: Sony BMG; Formats: CD, digital download	—	—	—	—	
The Silver Collection	Released: August 2007; Label: Spectrum Music/Universal; Formats: CD, digital download	—	—	—	—	
The Acoustic Album	Released: 2010; Label: Summerhouse; Formats: CD	—	—	—	—	
Lessons in Love – The Collection	Released: October 2010; Label: Spectrum Music; Formats: 2xCD, digital download	—	—	—	—	
Something About You – The Collection	Released: 12 January 2015; Label: Spectrum Music; Formats: CD, digital download	—	—	—	—	
Collected	Released: 8 July 2016; Label: Universal Music; Formats: 3xCD	—	—	—	56	
Lessons in Love – The Essential Collection	Released: 24 February 2017; Label: Spectrum Music/Universal; Formats: 3xCD, digital download	—	—	—	—	
Essential	Released: 17 July 2020; Label: Universal; Formats: 3xCD	53	—	—	—	
B-Sides	Released: 17 June 2022; Label: Polydor; Formats: digital download	—	—	—	—	
"—" denotes releases that did not chart or were not released in that territory.

=== Box sets ===
Title	Album details
Collectors CD Set	Released: 1989; Label: Polydor; Formats: 4xCD
1980–1989 Complete	Released: 25 November 1991; Label: Polydor; Formats: 9xCD; Germany-only release
Living It Up	Released: July 2010; Label: Universal; Formats: 4xCD, digital download
5 Classic Albums	Released: 30 October 2015; Label: Polydor/Spectrum Music/Universal; Formats: 5xCD
The Complete Polydor Years 1980–1984	Released: 26 March 2021; Label: Robinsongs/Cherry Red; Formats: 10xCD
The Complete Polydor Years 1985–1989	Released: 30 July 2021; Label: Robinsongs/Cherry Red; Formats: 10xCD
The Later Years 1991–1998	Released: 24 November 2023; Label: Robinsongs/Cherry Red; Formats: 7xCD

== EPs ==
Title	EP details	Peak chart positions
Title	EP details	UK
A Physical Presence	Released: May 1985; Label: Polydor; Formats: 7", 12"	87
Sirens	Released: 31 October 2013; Label: Level 42; Formats: 12", CD, digital download	—
"—" denotes releases that did not chart.

== Singles ==
Title	Year	Peak chart positions										Certifications	Album
Title	Year	UK	BEL (FL)	CAN	GER	IRE	IT	NL	NZ	US	US Dance	Certifications	Album
"Sandstorm" (Note: 1100 white label records released commercially – Level 42 provided the B-side "Sandstorm" to the A-side "Journey To...'" by 'Powerline'. The release was purely commercial, the 'white labels' were used to give the record 'underground' credibility.)	1980	—	—	—	—	—	—	—	—	—	—		The Early Tapes
"Love Meeting Love"	1980	61	—	—	—	—	—	—	—	—	—		The Early Tapes
"(Flying on the) Wings of Love"	1980	76	—	—	—	—	—	—	—	—	—		The Early Tapes
"Love Games"	1981	38	15	—	—	—	—	4	—	—	—		Level 42
"Turn It On"	1981	57	—	—	—	—	—	—	—	—	—		Level 42
"Starchild"	1981	47	35	—	—	—	—	17	—	—	57		Level 42
"Are You Hearing (What I Hear)?"	1982	49	—	—	—	—	—	—	—	—	—		The Pursuit of Accidents
"Weave Your Spell"	1982	43	—	—	—	—	—	—	—	—	—		The Pursuit of Accidents
"The Chinese Way"	1983	24	35	—	—	27	—	45	—	—	—		The Pursuit of Accidents
"Out of Sight, Out of Mind"	1983	41	—	—	—	—	—	—	—	—	—		Standing in the Light
"The Sun Goes Down (Living It Up)"	1983	10	34	—	—	18	—	—	—	—	—		Standing in the Light
"Micro-Kid"	1983	37	—	—	—	—	—	—	—	—	25		Standing in the Light
"Hot Water"	1984	18	5	—	—	—	—	4	—	87 (Note: "Hot Water" charted in the US in 1986.)	—		True Colours
"The Chant Has Begun"	1984	41	—	—	—	—	—	38	—	—	—		True Colours
"Something About You" (Note: "Something About You" and "Leaving Me Now" both charted on the US Adult Contemporary chart, peaking at number 10 and 32 respectively. "Something About You" also hit number 45 on the US Album Rock Tracks chart.)	1985	6	—	13	—	7	12	33	10	7	4	UK: Silver; CAN: Gold; NZ: Gold	World Machine
"Leaving Me Now"	1985	15	40	—	—	19	—	27	35	—	—		World Machine
"Lessons in Love"	1986	3	3	14	1	3	2	2	18	12	12	UK: Silver; CAN: Gold; NL: Gold	Running in the Family
"World Machine" (Shep Pettibone remix; US-only release)	1986	—	—	—	—	—	—	—	—	—	23		World Machine
"Running in the Family"	1987	6	3	35	12	4	8	3	9	83	—		Running in the Family
"To Be with You Again"	1987	10	14	—	39	6	—	10	20	—	—		Running in the Family
"It's Over"	1987	10	12	—	—	3	—	8	—	—	—		Running in the Family
"Children Say"	1987	22	16	—	—	25	—	8	—	—	—		Running in the Family
"Heaven in My Hands"	1988	12	6	75	22	9	12	4	—	—	—		Staring at the Sun
"Take a Look"	1988	32	24	—	—	13	—	15	—	—	—		Staring at the Sun
"Tracie"	1989	25	24	—	—	19	—	16	—	—	—		Staring at the Sun
"Take Care of Yourself"	1989	39	30	—	—	—	9	14	—	—	—		Level Best
"Guaranteed"	1991	17	30	60	51	25	21	20	—	—	—		Guaranteed
"Overtime"	1991	62	—	—	—	—	—	51	—	—	—		Guaranteed
"My Father's Shoes"	1992	55	—	—	—	—	—	—	—	—	—		Guaranteed
"Forever Now"	1994	19	—	—	51	—	—	25	—	—	—		Forever Now
"All Over You"	1994	26	—	—	—	—	—	—	—	—	—		Forever Now
"Love in a Peaceful World"	1994	31	—	—	—	—	—	—	—	—	—		Forever Now
"The Sun Goes Down (Living It Up) '98 Mix"	1998	—	—	—	—	—	—	—	—	—	—		The Very Best of Level 42
"Starchild" (remix) (with BMR)	2001	—	—	—	—	—	—	—	—	—	—		Non-album single
"The Way Back Home"	2006	—	—	—	—	—	—	—	—	—	—		Retroglide
"Love Games" (live)	2013	—	—	—	—	—	—	—	—	—	—		Non-album singles
"Hot Water" (live)	2013	—	—	—	—	—	—	—	—	—	—		Non-album singles
"My Independence Day"	2015	—	—	—	—	—	—	—	—	—	—		Non-album singles
"—" denotes releases that did not chart or were not released in that territory.

== Videography ==
=== Video albums ===
Title	Album details
Videosingles	Released: 26 June 1986; Label: CMV/PolyGram Video; Formats: VHS, VHD, LD
Live at Wembley	Released: September 1987; Label: Channel 5/PolyGram Video; Formats: VHS, CDV
Family of Five	Released: December 1987; Label: Channel 5/PolyGram Video; Formats: VHS, CDV
Fait Accompli	Released: 12 May 1989; Label: PolyGram Video; Formats: VHS, LD
Level Best	Released: November 1989; Label: PolyGram Video; Formats: VHS, LD, CDV
Guaranteed Live	Released: June 1992; Label: Picture Music International; Formats: VHS, LD
Classic Level 42	Released: 2005; Label: Polydor; Formats: DVD
At Rockpalast	Released: May 2005; Label: ARD Video/Wienerworld; Formats: DVD
The Retroglide Tour	Released: 2007; Label: Mark King; Formats: DVD
Essential Videos	Released: 2007; Label: Universal Music; Formats: DVD
Live in Holland 2009	Released: 2009; Label: Self-released; Formats: DVD
Turn It On	Released: February 2010; Label: Rockpalast; Formats: DVD
1980–2010 – 30th Anniversary World Tour	Released: 2 May 2011; Label: Summerhouse; Formats: DVD
Eternity	Released: 4 February 2019; Label: Level 42; Formats: DVD

=== Music videos ===
List of music videos, showing year released and directors
Title	Year	Director(s)
"Are You Hearing (What I Hear)?"	1982	David G. Hillier
"Weave Your Spell"	1982	David G. Hillier
"Out of Sight, Out of Mind"	1983	M.D. Phillips
"Micro-Kid"	1983	David G. Hillier
"The Sun Goes Down (Living It Up)"	1983	David G. Hillier
"Hot Water"	1984	David G. Hillier
"The Chant Has Begun"	1985	David G. Hillier
"Something About You"	1985	Stuart Orme
"Leaving Me Now"	1985	Nigel Dick
"Lessons in Love"	1986	Stuart Orme
"Running in the Family"	1987	Stuart Orme
"To Be with You Again"	1987	Peter Christopherson
"It's Over"	1987	The Molotov Brothers
"Children Say"	1987	The Molotov Brothers
"Heaven in My Hands"	1988	Steve Barron
"Take a Look"	1988	David Hogan
"Tracie"	1988	David Hogan
"Take Care of Yourself"	1989	David Hogan
"Guaranteed" (version 1)	1991	The Mill
"Guaranteed" (version 2)	1991	The Mill
"Overtime"	1991	Steve Graham
"My Father's Shoes"	1992	Steve Graham
"Forever Now"	1994	Nigel Simpkiss
"All Over You"	1994	Nigel Simpkiss
"Love in a Peaceful World"	1994	Jeff Baynes
