= The Definitive Collection (Level 42 album) =

Greatest hits album by Level 42
- Released: June 2006
- Recorded: 1980–1989
- Genre: Rock; pop; jazz-funk
- Label: Polydor

Level 42 chronology
The Very Best of Level 42 (1998)	The Definitive Collection (2006)	Retroglide (2006)

The Definitive Collection is a greatest hits album by English jazz-funk band Level 42, released in June 2006. The album peaked at number 20 on the UK Albums Chart.

== Track listing ==
1. "Lessons in Love" (from Running in the Family)
2. "The Sun Goes Down (Living It Up)" (from Standing in the Light)
3. "Heaven in My Hands" (from Staring at the Sun)
4. "Something About You" (from World Machine)
5. "Hot Water" (from True Colours)
6. "The Chinese Way" (from The Pursuit of Accidents)
7. "Leaving Me Now" (from World Machine)
8. "Running in the Family" (from Running in the Family)
9. "To Be with You Again" (from Running in the Family)
10. "Tracie" (from Staring at the Sun)
11. "It's Over" (from Running in the Family)
12. "Micro-Kid" (from Standing in the Light)
13. "Children Say" (from Running in the Family)
14. "Love Games" (from Level 42)
15. "Turn It On" (from Level 42)
16. "Starchild" (from Level 42)
17. "Take a Look" (from Staring at the Sun)
18. "Take Care of Yourself" (from Level Best)

== Personnel ==
- Mark King – vocals, bass guitar
- Mike Lindup – keyboards, vocals
- Boon Gould – guitars (tracks 1, 2, 4–9, 11–16)
- Phil Gould – drums (tracks 1, 2, 4–9, 11–16)
- Gary Husband – drums (tracks 3, 10, 17, 18)
- Alan Murphy – guitars (tracks 3, 10, 17, 18)
- Wally Badarou – keyboards, vocals

== Charts ==
Chart (2006)	Peak position
UK Albums (OCC)	20

== Certifications ==
Certifications for The Definitive Collection
Region	Certification	Certified units/sales
United Kingdom (BPI)	Gold	100,000^{‡}
^{‡} Sales+streaming figures based on certification alone.
