= The Very Best of Level 42 =

Greatest hits album by Level 42
- Released: October 1998
- Genre: Rock; pop; pop rock; jazz
- Length: 76:36
- Label: Universal; Polydor
- Producer: Mark King; Mike Lindup; Phil Gould; Steve Anderson

Level 42 chronology
Forever Now (1994)	The Very Best of Level 42 (1998)	The Definitive Collection (2006)

Singles from The Very Best of Level 42
- 1. "The Sun Goes Down (Living It Up) '98 Mix (featuring Omar)" Released: 12 October 1998

Professional ratings
Review scores
Source	Rating
AllMusic	4/5 stars

The Very Best of Level 42 is a greatest hits album by English jazz-funk band Level 42. It features a chronological track listing of the band's hit single releases from 1981 to 1994. The building featured on the album cover is 11 Diagonal Street in Johannesburg, South Africa.

== Track listing ==
1. "Love Games" (King, P. Gould) – 4:14 from Level 42
2. "The Chinese Way" (King, P. Gould, Badarou) – 4:03 from The Pursuit of Accidents
3. "The Sun Goes Down (Living It Up)" (King, Badarou, Lindup, P. Gould) – 3:46 from Standing in the Light
4. "Micro-Kid" (King, Badarou, P. Gould, Lindup) – 3:49 from Standing in the Light
5. "Hot Water" (King, Badarou, P. Gould, Lindup) – 3:37 from True Colours
6. "The Chant Has Begun" (King, P. Gould) – 4:19 from True Colours
7. "Something About You" (King, P. Gould, R. Gould, Badarou, Lindup) – 3:45 from World Machine
8. "Leaving Me Now" (King, P. Gould, Badarou) – 3:35 from World Machine
9. "Lessons in Love" (King, R. Gould, Badarou) – 4:02 from Running in the Family
10. "Running in the Family" (King, P. Gould, Badarou) – 3:58 from Running in the Family
11. "To Be with You Again" (King, R. Gould) – 3:56 from Running in the Family
12. "It's Over" (King, Badarou, R. Gould) – 4:41 from Running in the Family
13. "Children Say" (King, P. Gould, Badarou) – 4:28 from Running in the Family
14. "Heaven in My Hands" (King, R. Gould) – 4:08 from Staring at the Sun
15. "Take a Look" (King, R. Gould, Badarou, Lindup) – 4:43 from Staring at the Sun
16. "Tracie" (King, Husband) – 3:25 from Staring at the Sun
17. "Guaranteed" (King, Lindup, Badarou, Husband) – 3:51 from Guaranteed
18. "Forever Now" (King, Musker, Darbyshire) – 4:16 from Forever Now
19. "The Sun Goes Down (Living It Up) '98 Mix" (featuring Omar) (King, Badarou, Lindup, P. Gould) – 4:00

== Personnel ==
- Mark King – vocals, bass
- Mike Lindup – keyboards, vocals
- Boon Gould – guitars (tracks 1–13)
- Phil Gould – drums (tracks 1–13, 18)
- Gary Husband – drums (tracks 14–17)
- Alan Murphy – guitars (tracks 14–16)
- Allan Holdsworth – guitars (track 17)
- Dominic Miller – guitars (track 17)
- Danny Blume – guitars (track 18)
- Wally Badarou – keyboards

== Production ==
- Tracks 1 and 2 produced by Mike Vernon for Handle Artists
- Track 3 produced by Larry Dunn and Verdine White
- Track 4 produced by Andy Sojka and Jerry Pike for Unbelievable Productions
- Tracks 5 and 6 produced and engineered by Ken Scott for Komos Production
- Tracks 7–13 produced by Wally Badarou and Level 42. Assistant producer, engineer and mixer – Julian Mendelsohn
- Tracks 14–16 produced by Level 42, Wally Badarou and Julian Mendelsohn
- Track 17 produced by Level 42 and Wally Badarou at the Summerhouse. Mixed by Tom Lord-Alge at the Hit Factory, New York
- Track 18 produced by Mark King, Mike Lindup, Phil Gould and Steve Anderson. Engineered by Paul Wright, assisted by Tim Pilling
- Track 19 produced by Level 42. Remix by Dodge for Soul Inside Productions. Keyboards by Jonathan Shorten. Additional vocals by Omar Lye-Fook. Engineered and recorded at Inside Sound Studio by Dodge. Mastered by Mike Showell at Metropolis.

== Certifications ==
Certifications for The Very Best of Level 42
Region	Certification	Certified units/sales
United Kingdom (BPI)	Gold	100,000^{‡}
^{‡} Sales+streaming figures based on certification alone.
