= Level Best =

Greatest hits album by Level 42
- Released: 6 November 1989
- Recorded: 1981–1989
- Length: 72:36 (CD/Cassette/DCC); 56.08 (LP)
- Label: Polydor
- Producer: Wally Badarou; Level 42; Mike Vernon; Larry Dunn; Verdine White

Level 42 chronology
| Staring at the Sun (1988) | Level Best (1989) | Guaranteed (1991) |

Singles from Level Best
- 1. "Take Care of Yourself" Released: 16 October 1989

Professional ratings
Review scores
| Source | Rating |
|---|---|
| AllMusic | 4.5/5 stars |
| Smash Hits | 5/10 |

Level Best is a compilation album featuring the most successful singles by the English band Level 42. It was released at the end of 1989, marking a decade since the band's beginnings.

== Track listing ==
| No. | Title | Writer(s) | Album | Length |
|---|---|---|---|---|
| 1. | "Running in the Family" | Mark King; Phil Gould; Wally Badarou | Running in the Family | 3:57 |
| 2. | "The Sun Goes Down (Living It Up)" | King; P. Gould; Mike Lindup; Badarou | Standing in the Light | 3:35 |
| 3. | "Something About You" | King; P. Gould; Lindup; Badarou; Rowland Gould | World Machine | 3:44 |
| 4. | "Tracie" | King; Gary Husband | Staring at the Sun | 3:22 |
| 5. | "Starchild" | King; P. Gould; Badarou | Level 42 | 3:52 |
| 6. | "It's Over" | King; R. Gould; Badarou | Running in the Family | 4:42 |
| 7. | "Hot Water" | King; P. Gould; Lindup; Badarou | True Colours | 3:39 |
| 8. | "Take Care of Yourself" | King | Previously unreleased | 4:28 |
| 9. | "Heaven in My Hands" | King; R. Gould | Staring at the Sun | 4:09 |
| 10. | "Children Say" | King; P. Gould; Lindup | Running in the Family | 4:28 |
| 11. | "Love Games" | King; P. Gould | Level 42 | 4:32 |
| 12. | "The Chinese Way" | King; P. Gould; Badarou | The Pursuit of Accidents | 3:57 |
| 13. | "Leaving Me Now" | King; P. Gould; Badarou | World Machine | 3:31 |
| 14. | "Lessons in Love" | King; R. Gould; Badarou | Running in the Family | 4:00 |

Additional tracks on CD and cassette releases
| No. | Title | Writer(s) | Album | Length |
|---|---|---|---|---|
| 15. | "Micro-kid" | King; P. Gould; Badarou; B. Taylor; Allee Willis | Standing in the Light | 3:47 |
| 16. | "Take a Look" | King; B. Gould; Lindup; Badarou | Staring at the Sun | 4:41 |
| 17. | "To Be with You Again" | King; R. Gould | Running in the Family | 3:55 |
| 18. | "The Chant Has Begun" | King; P. Gould | True Colours | 4:17 |

== Personnel ==
- Mark King – vocals, bass
- Mike Lindup – keyboards, vocals
- Boon Gould – guitars (tracks 1–3, 5–7, 10–15, 17, 18)
- Phil Gould – drums (tracks 1–3, 5–7, 10–15, 17, 18)
- Gary Husband – drums (tracks 4, 8, 9, 16)
- Alan Murphy – guitars (tracks 4, 8, 9, 16)
- Wally Badarou – keyboards

== Charts ==
=== Weekly charts ===
| Chart (1989–1990) | Peak position |
|---|---|
| Dutch Albums (Album Top 100) | 5 |
| German Albums (Offizielle Top 100) | 44 |
| UK Albums (OCC) | 5 |

=== Year-end charts ===
| Chart (1989) | Position |
|---|---|
| Dutch Albums (Album Top 100) | 98 |

== Sales and certifications ==
Certifications for Level Best
| Region | Certification | Certified units/sales |
|---|---|---|
| Netherlands (NVPI) | Gold | 50,000^{^} |
^{^} Shipments figures based on certification alone.
