= A Physical Presence =

1985 live album by Level 42

Live album by Level 42
- Released: 28 June 1985
- Recorded: March 1985
- Venue: The Coronet (Woolwich); The Hexagon (Reading); Goldiggers (Chippenham, Wiltshire)
- Genre: Jazz-funk; new wave
- Length: 90:22 (2 CD edition); 65:18 (1 CD edition)
- Label: Polydor
- Producer: Gregg Jackman; Level 42

Level 42 chronology
True Colours (1984)	A Physical Presence (1985)	World Machine (1985)

A Physical Presence is a two-disc live album by the English jazz-funk band Level 42, released in June 1985 and recorded in England during March of that year at the Coronet Woolwich, the Hexagon, Reading and Goldiggers, Chippenham, Wiltshire. This album is notable for being the first live album by Level 42, and for containing a previously unreleased song ("Follow Me", which was later remixed and issued as part of an EP) and a live recording of a non-LP track ("Foundation & Empire", originally the B-side of "Starchild", available on the 2000 CD reissue of Level 42). "Love Games" is preceded by an extended bass intro, which contains also part of "Dune Tune". Also, the first track ("Almost There") starts with a taped intro which quotes "Hot Water".

Originally issued in the UK as a two-album set and long-play cassette, the version issued on CD consisted of a single disc, omitting three tracks ("Turn It On", "Mr Pink" and "88"). Those tracks were restored when the remastered version of the album was issued in a two-CD set in 2000.

== Track listing ==
=== Disc one ===
1. "Almost There" (Mark King, Phil Gould, Rowland "Boon" Gould) – 6:47
2. "Turn It On" (Wally Badarou, P. Gould, R. Gould, King) – 5:47
3. "Mr. Pink" (Badarou, King) – 6:08
4. "Eyes Waterfalling" (King, P. Gould, Mike Lindup, R. Gould) – 5:20
5. "Kansas City Milkman" (Badarou, King, Lindup, P. Gould) – 7:17
6. "Follow Me" (King, R. Gould) – 5:01
7. "Foundation & Empire" (King) – 8:39

=== Disc two ===
1. "The Chant Has Begun" (King, P. Gould) – 6:12
2. "The Chinese Way" (King, P. Gould, Badarou) – 4:47
3. "The Sun Goes Down (Living It Up)" (Badarou, King, Lindup, P. Gould) – 4:59
4. "Hot Water" (King, P. Gould, Lindup, Badarou) – 6:24
5. "Love Games" (King, P. Gould) – 9:44
6. "88" (King) – 12:33

== EP release ==
A Physical Presence

EP by Level 42
- Released: 7 June 1985
- Genre: New wave
- Label: Polydor
- Producer: Level 42; Gregg Jackman

A Physical Presence is a live EP by Level 42.

The EP features songs from their 1985 live album of the same name. In various other markets, the lead track "Follow Me" was released as a standard single.

=== Track listing ===
12" EP release

1. "Follow Me"
2. "Mr Pink"
3. "Turn It On"
4. "Kansas City Milkman"

7" release

1. "Follow Me"
2. "Turn It On"
3. "Kansas City Milkman"

== Personnel ==
Level 42

- Mark King – bass guitar, vocals
- Mike Lindup – keyboards, vocals
- Phil Gould – drums, backing vocals
- Boon Gould – guitars

Plus:

- Krys Mach – saxophones

== Production ==
- Gregg Jackman – producer, mixing
- Level 42 – producers, mixing
- Mick McKenna – engineer
- John Irving – assistant engineer
- Charlie MacPherson – assistant engineer
- Roger Howorth – mix assistant
- Rob O'Connor – sleeve design, screen print
- Simon Fowler – photography
- Alex Madjitey – back sleeve photography
- John Gould – management
- Sarah Gould – management
