= World Machine (song) =

"World Machine" (Shep Pettibone remix)

Single by Level 42

from the album World Machine
- B-side: "World Machine" (dub)
- Released: October 1986
- Studio: Maison Rouge (Fulham, West London)
- Genre: Jazz-funk
- Length: 5:39
- Label: Polydor
- Songwriters: Wally Badarou; Phil Gould; Mark King; Mike Lindup
- Producers: Wally Badarou; Level 42

Level 42 singles chronology
"Lessons in Love" (1986)	"World Machine" (Shep Pettibone remix) (1986)	"Running in the Family" (1987)

Licensed audio
- "World Machine" (Shep Pettibone remix) on YouTube

"World Machine" is a song written by Wally Badarou, Phil Gould, Mark King and Mike Lindup that became the title track of the English jazz-funk band Level 42's sixth studio album. A remix of the song by Shep Pettibone was released as a 12-inch single in the US in October 1986 and peaked at No. 25 on the US Billboard Hot Dance/Disco – Club Play chart in 1987.

== Critical reception ==
The review of the 12-inch single remix in Billboard read, "Pulsating electrojazz cut, much requested earlier this year as an album track, newly remixed for club impact." In his review of the World Machine album for Rolling Stone, Steve Bloom wrote that the title track was "their best effort: propelled by Phil Gould's explosive tribal beat, it showcases Mike Lindup's considerable keyboard talents." William Cooper's retrospective review of the album for AllMusic noted, "The jazzy, upbeat title track is one of the band's finest moments."

== Track listing ==
- 12-inch single
1. "World Machine" (remix) – 5:39
2. "World Machine" (dub) – 7:24

== Personnel ==
Credits adapted from the liner notes for the World Machine album.

Level 42

- Mark King – bass guitar, vocals
- Mike Lindup – keyboards, vocals
- Phil Gould – drums
- Boon Gould – guitars

Additional musicians

- Wally Badarou – Synclavier, additional vocals
- Gary Barnacle – saxophone

Production

- Level 42 – producers
- Wally Badarou – producer
- Julian Mendelsohn – production assistant, recording
- Shep Pettibone – remixing

== Bibliography ==
- Whitburn, Joel (2004), Joel Whitburn's Hot Dance/Disco, 1974–2003, Record Research Inc., ISBN 978-0-89820-156-7
