= Beautiful Wounds =

Studio album by Phil Gould
- Released: 26 July 2021
- Studio: Chale Abbey, Isle of Wight; Studio 99, London; L.O.A.D, Rome; Stingray Studios, Isle of Wight; Bongo Saloon, London; The Windmill Studio, Norfolk; 241 Studios, London; Al's Pioneer Town Palace, Burbank, California; Stimia Studios, London; Cedar Creek Studios, Austin, Texas
- Genre: Soul, jazz, pop
- Length: 54:31
- Label: Abbey Records
- Producer: Phil Gould; David Cranshaw; Rupert Brown

Phil Gould chronology
Watertight (2009)	Beautiful Wounds (2021)

Singles from Beautiful Wounds
- 1. "Beautiful Wounds" Released: November 2020; 2. "The Dance" Released: March 2021; 3. "Faint Love" Released: May 2021

Beautiful Wounds is a studio album by the British drummer, singer and songwriter Phil Gould. It was released on Abbey Records in July 2021.

The album includes the last recording made by Phil's brother and fellow Level 42 band member Boon Gould, who plays a guitar solo on the track "The Russian Submariner". The title track "Beautiful Wounds" was released as a single with a video by the Italian director, Sarah Scherer.

== Reception ==
In its review of the album, Luxury News Online describes Beautiful Wounds as "an exquisite example of Phil Gould’s writing and musical prowess."

== Track listing ==
All compositions by Phil Gould except where noted.

1. "Beautiful Wounds" (P. Gould, B. Locker, M. Neary, T. Crawley) – 5:36
2. "The Dance" – 4:56
3. "Truly Wise" – 6:08
4. "Thank You" – 3:56
5. "Faint Love" (P. Gould, W. Badarou) – 5:16
6. "Open Wide" – 6:00
7. "Body Blows" – 4:02
8. "The Russian Submariner" (P. Gould, D. Granshaw, R. Brown, C. Jones) – 5:05
9. "The Fear of Fear" – 5:30
10. "Nina" (P. Gould, A. Mareek) – 4:05
11. "Annie: My First Success" – 5:17

== Personnel ==
- Phil Gould – lead vocals (tracks 2, 6 and 11), drums, percussion, piano, organ, keyboards, clavinet, marimba, congas and backing vocals
- Diana Winter – lead and backing vocals (tracks 1, 3 and 7)
- Keira Osment – lead vocals (track 4)
- Anji Hinke – lead vocals (tracks 5 and 9)
- Allison Mareek – lead vocals (track 10) and backing vocals (track 6)
- Severin Mouletin – lead and choir vocals (track 8)
- Wally Badarou – keyboards, arrangements (tracks 1, 3, 5, 9, 10 and 11)
- Al Slavik – keyboards, arrangements (track 11)
- Bernhard Locker – acoustic and electric guitar (tracks 1, 2, 3 and 7)
- Boon Gould – guitar (track 8)
- Fabio Balestrieri – guitar (track 1, 3, 6 and 11)
- Katie Marie – guitar (track 6)
- Jon Gingell – dobro guitar (track 6)
- Mark Neary – bass, pedal steel guitar (tracks 1, 2, 3 and 7)
- Nick Pini – electric and acoustic bass (tracks 4, 5, 6, 8, 10 and 11)
- Yolanda Charles – bass (tracks 5 and 9)
- Peter Inagawa – double bass (tracks 2 and 7)
- Dave Granshaw – plucked bass, guitar, sonics (tracks 4 and 8)
- Rupert Brown – drums, percussion, guitar (tracks 1, 2, 4, 5, 6, 7, 8, 10 and 11)
- Miles Bould – drums, percussion (tracks 3 and 9)
- Ash Soan – drums (tracks 5)
- Peter Eckford – congas, percussion (track 8)
- Neil Black – violin, effects (track 9)
- Matthias Jakisic – violin (track 1)
- Gary Barnacle – saxophone (track 10)
- Gianinna Delpino – backing vocals (track 2, 4 and 11)
- Sumudu Jayatilaka – backing vocals (track 1)
- Nadja Fro – backing vocals (track 3)
- Alex Gould – backing vocals, keyboards, marimba (track 5, 6 and 11)
- Mike Lindup – backing vocals and vocal arrangements (track 6)
- Sarah Ozelle – vocal arrangements (track 5 and 9)

== Production ==
- Phil Gould – producer
- Dave Granshaw – producer (tracks 6 and 8)
- Rupert Brown – producer (tracks 2 and 8)
- Geoff Pesche – mastering at Abbey Road Studios
- Gianinna Delpino – sleeve artwork
- Paul Waller – sleeve design
- Mathias Jakisic – photography
- Tina Korhonen – photography
- Maria Zhytnikova – photography
