= Children Say =

- 7" single cover

Single by Level 42

from the album Running in the Family
- B-side: "Starchild"
- Released: 30 November 1987
- Recorded: 1986
- Length: 4:28 (7" remix); 4:53 (album version)
- Label: Polydor
- Songwriters: Mark King; Mike Lindup; Phil Gould
- Producer: Level 42

Level 42 singles chronology
"It's Over" (1987)	"Children Say" (1987)	"Heaven in My Hands" (1988)

Music video
- "Children Say" on YouTube

"Children Say" is a song by English jazz-funk band Level 42. Written by Mark King, Mike Lindup and Phil Gould, it was the final single to be issued from their album, Running in the Family (1987). The song made the top 30 in the UK, and the top 10 in the Netherlands, and followed a series of successes with the hits "Lessons in Love", "Running in the Family", "To Be with You Again" and "It's Over".

== Music video ==
The video of the song was the first of Level 42's career not to feature the brothers Phil and Boon Gould, who had recently left the band. The video was shot in Paris. The Gould brothers are also missing from the sleeve of the single.

== Charts ==
=== Weekly charts ===
Chart (1987–1988)	Peak position
Belgium (Ultratop 50 Flanders)	16
Ireland (IRMA)	25
Italy Airplay (Music & Media)	3
Netherlands (Dutch Top 40)	9
Netherlands (Single Top 100)	8
UK Singles (OCC)	22
