= The Early Tapes =

The Early Tapes (July/Aug 1980)

Studio album by Level 42
- Released: March 1982
- Recorded: July–August 1980
- Genre: Jazz-funk; dance-rock; jazz fusion
- Length: 41:44
- Label: Polydor
- Producer: Andy Sojka; Jerry Pike

Level 42 chronology
Level 42 (1981)	The Early Tapes (July/Aug 1980) (1982)	The Pursuit of Accidents (1982)

Singles from The Early Tapes (July/Aug 1980)
- 1. "Love Meeting Love" Released: April 1980; 2. "(Flying on The) Wings of Love" Released: November 1980

Professional ratings
Review scores
Source	Rating
AllMusic	3/5 stars
Q	3/5 stars

The Early Tapes (July/Aug 1980), also known as Strategy, is the second album released, but first to be recorded, by English jazz-funk group Level 42. Originally recorded for Elite Records, the band subsequently signed to Polydor, who bought the masters from Elite and issued it in March 1982. It features Level 42's first two singles—"Love Meeting Love" (UK #61) and "(Flying on The) Wings of Love" (UK #76).

== Track listing ==
1. "Sandstorm" (Badarou, King) – 4:41
2. "Love Meeting Love" (Boon Gould, King) – 6:24
3. "Theme to Margaret" (King) – 3:59
4. "Autumn (Paradise Is Free)" (King) – 4:45
5. "(Flying on The) Wings of Love" (Badarou, Phil Gould, Boon Gould, King, Lindup) – 6:58
6. "Woman" (Lindup) – 4:38
7. "Mr. Pink" (Badarou, King) – 5:08
8. "88" (King) – 5:11

== Personnel ==
Level 42

- Mark King – bass guitar, percussion, vocals on "Love Meeting Love" & "Autumn (Paradise is Free)", chant vocals on "88"
- Mike Lindup – keyboards, percussion, vocals on "Wings of Love", chant vocals on "88"
- Boon Gould – guitars, alto saxophone
- Phil Gould – drums, percussion

with:

- Wally Badarou – Prophet 5 and inspiration
- Leroy Williams – percussion (Courtesy EMI)
- Dave Chambers – tenor and soprano saxophones

== Charts ==
Chart (1982)	Peak position
UK Albums (OCC)	70

== Release history ==
Year	Format	Label
1982	LP	Polydor
1986	LP; MC; CD	Polydor
1990	CD	PolyGram
1993	CD	Polydor
2004	CD	Universal/Spectrum
2006	CD	Universal
2007	CD	Polydor
