= List of number-one hits of 1987 (Denmark) =

This is a list of the Danish Singles Chart number-one hits of 1987 from the International Federation of the Phonographic Industry and Nielsen Marketing Research. They were provided through Music & Media magazine under the "Top 10 Sales In Europe" section.

== Chart history ==
Week	Single	Artist
January 10	"Jeg Ved En Lerkerede"	Kim Larsen
January 17	"Jeg Ved En Lerkerede"	Kim Larsen
January 24	"Giv Mig Hvad Du Har"	Dodo & the Dodos
January 31	"Giv Mig Hvad Du Har"	Dodo & the Dodos
February 7	"Giv Mig Hvad Du Har"	Dodo & the Dodos
February 14	"Giv Mig Hvad Du Har"	Dodo & the Dodos
February 21	"Giv Mig Hvad Du Har"	Dodo & the Dodos
February	"Giv Mig Hvad Du Har"	Dodo & the Dodos
March 7	"Go 'Nat"	Dodo & the Dodos
March 14	"Running in the Family"	Level 42
March 21	"Running in the Family"	Level 42
March 28	"Running in the Family"	Level 42
April 4	"Running in the Family"	Level 42
April 11	"Running in the Family"	Level 42
April 18	"Running in the Family"	Level 42
April 25	"Sign o' the Times"	Prince
May 2	"Let It Be"	Ferry Aid
May 9	"Let It Be"	Ferry Aid
May 16	"Let It Be"	Ferry Aid
May 23	"Let It Be"	Ferry Aid
May 30	"Vend Kajakken"	Kim Larsen
June 6	"Vend Kajakken"	Kim Larsen
June 13	"Vend Kajakken"	Kim Larsen
June 20	"I Wanna Dance With Somebody (Who Loves Me)"	Whitney Houston
June 27	"I Wanna Dance With Somebody (Who Loves Me)"	Whitney Houston
July 4	"I Wanna Dance With Somebody (Who Loves Me)"	Whitney Houston
July 11	"I Wanna Dance With Somebody (Who Loves Me)"	Whitney Houston
July 18	"Vend Kajakken"	Kim Larsen
July 25	"Vend Kajakken"	Kim Larsen
August 1	"Vend Kajakken"	Kim Larsen
August 8	"Who's That Girl"	Madonna
August 15	"Who's That Girl"	Madonna
August 22	"Who's That Girl"	Madonna
August 29	"Who's That Girl"	Madonna
September 5	"Who's That Girl"	Madonna
September 12	"I Just Can't Stop Loving You"	Michael Jackson
September 19	"It's a Sin"	Pet Shop Boys
September 26	"It's a Sin"	Pet Shop Boys
October 3	"Never Let Me Down Again"	Depeche Mode
October 10	"Never Let Me Down Again"	Depeche Mode
October 17	"Bad"	Michael Jackson
October 24	"Bad"	Michael Jackson
October 31	"Causing a Commotion"	Madonna
November 7	"Causing a Commotion"	Madonna
November 14	"You Win Again"	The Bee Gees
November 21	"You Win Again"	The Bee Gees
November 28	"You Win Again"	The Bee Gees
December 5	"You Win Again"	The Bee Gees
December 12	"You Win Again"	The Bee Gees
December 19	"You Win Again"	The Bee Gees
December 26	"You Win Again"	The Bee Gees
