= To Be with You Again =

Single by Level 42

from the album Running in the Family
- Released: 13 April 1987
- Genre: Sophisti-pop
- Label: Polydor
- Songwriters: Mark King; Boon Gould
- Producers: Wally Badarou; Level 42

Level 42 singles chronology
"Running in the Family" (1987)	"To Be with You Again" (1987)	"It's Over" (1987)

Music video
- "To Be with You Again" on YouTube

"To Be with You Again" is a single released in 1987 by English jazz-funk band Level 42, from their album Running in the Family. The song was written by Mark King and Boon Gould, and was released as a single in other countries such as Australia, Germany, Italy, the Netherlands and others by the record label Polydor. The single was backed by a live version of "Micro-Kid" as its B-side, with the twelve-inch single also including a Shep Pettibone remix of "Lessons in Love".

"To Be with You Again" is the third Running in the Family single, released at the peak of their career. The single was preceded by two other UK Top 10 singles for the band: "Lessons in Love" (#3) and "Running in the Family" (#6). The song also gained popularity in the Netherlands, peaking at #6 in the Dutch Top 40.

This song's music video was directed by Peter Christopherson.

== Personnel ==
- Mark King – bass, vocals
- Mike Lindup – keyboards, vocals
- Boon Gould – guitars
- Phil Gould – drums

== Charts ==
=== Weekly charts ===
Chart (1987)	Peak position
Belgium (Ultratop 50 Flanders)	14
European Hot 100 Singles (Music & Media)	10
European Airplay (Music & Media)	5
Netherlands (Dutch Top 40)	6
Netherlands (Single Top 100)	10
New Zealand (Recorded Music NZ)	20
Switzerland (Schweizer Hitparade)	29
UK Singles (Official Charts)	10
West Germany (GfK)	39

=== Year-end charts ===
Chart (1987)	Position
Belgium (Ultratop Flanders)	95
Netherlands (Dutch Top 40)	63
Netherlands (Single Top 100)	77
