= Micro-Kid =

Single by Level 42

from the album Standing in the Light
- B-side: "Micro-Kid" (dub version)
- Released: 14 October 1983
- Genre: Jazz-funk; new wave
- Label: Polydor
- Songwriters: Wally Badarou; Mark King; Phil Gould; B. Taylor; Allee Willis
- Producers: Level 42; Wally Badarou

Level 42 singles chronology
| "The Sun Goes Down (Living It Up)" (1983) | "Micro-Kid" (1983) | "Hot Water" (1984) |

Music video
- "Micro-Kid" on YouTube

"Micro-Kid" is a single released in October 1983 by the English jazz-funk band Level 42 from their fourth studio album Standing in the Light. It ran for 5 weeks on the UK singles chart, peaking at #37. The song's lyrics dealt with the home computer craze which was gripping the UK at the time of the song's release.

This song is included on the Level 42 compilations Level Best, The Very Best of Level 42 and The Definitive Collection.

== Charts ==
| Chart (1983) | Peak position |
|---|---|
| UK Singles (OCC) | 37 |
