= Running in the Family (disambiguation) =

Running in the Family is an album by Level 42.

Running in the Family may also refer to:

- "Running in the Family" (song), a song by Level 42
- Running in the Family (memoir), a fictionalized memoir by Michael Ondaatje
