= Love Meeting Love =

Single by Level 42

from the album The Early Tapes/Strategy
- B-side: "Instrumental Love"
- Released: April 1980; August 1980 (re-release)
- Genre: Jazz-funk
- Label: Elite
- Songwriters: Mark King; Boon Gould

Level 42 singles chronology
"Sandstorm" (1980)	"Love Meeting Love" (1980)	"(Flying on the) Wings of Love" (1980)

"Love Meeting Love" is a song written by Mark King and Boon Gould, and released in 1980 by the British band Level 42 on Elite Records. It was the band's second single and the first Level 42 song that entered the UK singles chart, reaching No. 61. The song was included two years later on the studio album The Early Tapes/Strategy, released by Polydor Records.

"Love Meeting Love" was released only in the United Kingdom.

== Charts ==
Chart (1980)	Peak position
UK Singles (OCC)	61
