= It's Over (Level 42 song) =

- CD-video cover

Single by Level 42

from the album Running in the Family
- B-side: "Physical Presence" (live)
- Released: 1 September 1987
- Length: 4:40 (7" remix); 6:02 (album version)
- Label: Polydor
- Songwriters: Mark King; Wally Badarou; Boon Gould
- Producer: Level 42

Level 42 singles chronology
"To Be with You Again" (1987)	"It's Over" (1987)	"Children Say" (1987)

Music video
- "It's Over" on YouTube

"It's Over" is a song by English jazz-funk band Level 42. Released in 1987 as the fourth single from their album Running in the Family, it reached number 10 on the UK Singles Chart (becoming the band's sixth and final UK Top 10 hit).

== Release ==
In addition to the regular 7" single, two 12" singles were released with different track listings. A limited edition 7" single pack was also released, including four photo postcards (of the band members) taken from the video location shoot, and four Level 42 logo stickers. A CD Video single (CD-V) was also released in 1988.

The album version of the song was remixed for the single release and while both sound similar, the single version fades out at the end, while the album version features a clean ending.

== Music video ==
The music video for "It's Over" was shot in the Mammoth Lakes area of north-eastern California near the state border with Nevada.

== Track listing ==
- UK (Polydor; POSP 900 / 885 965-7) 7"
1. "It's Over" (remix) – 4:45
2. "Physical Presence" (live) – 5:45
- UK (Polydor; POSPX 900 / 885 965-1) 12"
1. "It's Over" (extended remix) – 6:00
2. "Physical Presence" (live) – 5:45
3. "It's Over" (instrumental) – 4:45
- UK (Polydor; POSPA 900 / 887 055-1) 12"
1. "It's Over" (extended remix) – 6:00
2. "Physical Presence" (live) – 5:45
3. "Running in the Family" (Dave "O" remix) – 6:37
- UK (Polydor; 080 156-2) CD Video (1988)
- Audio
1. "It's Over" (extended remix) – 5:59
2. "Running in the Family" (Dave "O" remix) – 6:34
3. "Physical Presence" (live) – 5:43
- Video
1. "It's Over" – 4:38

== Charts ==
=== Weekly charts ===
Chart (1987)	Peak position
Belgium (Ultratop 50 Flanders)	12
Italy Airplay (Music & Media)	9
Netherlands (Dutch Top 40)	7
Netherlands (Single Top 100)	8
UK Singles (OCC)	10

=== Year-end charts ===
Chart (1987)	Position
Netherlands (Dutch Top 40)	65
Netherlands (Single Top 100)	54
