= Fashion Fever =

Fashion Fever may refer to:

- Fashion Fever (Princess Gwenevere and the Jewel Riders), an episode of the TV series Princess Gwenevere and the Jewel Riders
- "Fashion Fever" (song), by Level 42 on the 1987 album Running in the Family
