= Atmosfear (band) =

Atmosfear are a jazz funk/Brit funk band who formed in the United Kingdom in 1978. The band was formed by two friends Lester J. Batchelor Jr. and Raymond Johnson two soul boys on the London soul and jazz funk music scene in the late 1970s, both of whom were regular club goers and record collectors. Johnson was a well known dancer and dance skater, Batchelor was a design student. They would attend out at local clubs such as Scamps, Bobby McGees, The Global Village, Wag and Billy's in London.

Atmosfear's original line up consisted of band leader, bassist, and keyboardist Batchelor, drummer Johnson, saxophonist Stewart Cawthorne, producer Jerry Pike and guitarist Andy Sojka, a figure on the Brit funk scene, who owned the All Ears dance music import shop in Harlesden, London, England, at the time. The Elite record label was originally created as a marketing and distribution vehicle to release Atmosfear's music, and following the success of Atmosfear it became a mecca for independent unsigned local artists.

A year later singer and guitarist Tony Antoniou joined the main line up. Regular support musician / members of the band were Batchelor's friends - keyboardist Peter Hinds, who has also been a member of UK jazz funk pioneers Light of the World and Incognito, and percussionist Leroy Williams, a member of UK soul band Hi-Tension, who had also played with Level 42, a band Sojka was introduced to following Atmosfear signing a recording deal with MCA Records.

Their most notable release was "Dancing In Outer Space", which reached the Top 50 of the UK Singles Chart in 1979. A double A-sided single followed, "Motivation" / "Extract" which did not chart. This track also became BBC Radio 1 DJ, Pete Tong's club track of the year, when it was released where Tong appeared at a nightclub close to Brands Hatch.

Following a major disagreement with Sojka, the main group line up changed, when Batchelor left soon after the release of the single "Xtra Special", which he had penned. The different version of the track was recorded in the United States, with the vocals provided by Dolette McDonald.

In the mid 1990s, Sojka set up three new dance music labels called Meta4, Chemical Discs and Jump Cut, with the latter releasing an album by Atmosfear called Trance Plants in 1994 and Meta4 releasing the act's Jangala Spirits in 1997. In the late 1990s, a remix project called Altered Slates, managed to get "Dancing In Outer Space" re-charting low down the Top 100 with mixes from Masters at Work's Louie Vega and Kenny 'Dope' Gonzales, who had sampled "Motivation" on their Bucketheads album track "I Wanna Know" a couple of years before the record re-charted. Also involved with the Altered Slates project were producer Francois Kevorkian and Dimitri from France.

In February 2000, Sojka died of multiple myeloma aged 48, while in the middle of recording a new Atmosfear album called Groove World.

In 2019, Bachelor debuted a new line-up of Atmosfear, and booked a number of live dates for 2020, which had to be rescheduled. He also released a new version of "Dancing In Outer Space" called "DIOS:2020" which featured Francesco Mendolia from Incognito alongside Orphy 'Vibes’ Robinson, Antonello Filaccio, Dee Byrne, Kenny Barry and Shelley 'Deeizm' Debenham.

== Discography ==
- "First" / "Foremost" (12" single) – Elite
- "Dancing In Outer Space" (7" and 12" single) – Elite/MCA Records (1979) - UK number 46
- "Dancing In Outer Space" / "Can't Live Without Your Love" (12") – Elektra (1980)
- "Motivation" (12") – Elite (1980)
- "Motivation" / "Extract" (12") – MCA Records (1980)
- En Trance (LP) – MCA Records (1981)
- "Invasion" (12") – Elite (1981)
- "Xtra Special" (12") – Elite (1982)
- "What Do We Do" (12") – Chrysalis (1983)
- "What Do We Do" (12") – Elite (1983)
- "Telepathy" (12") – Elite (1984)
- "When Tonight Is Over" (12") – Elite (1984)
- "Cuts Like a Knife" (12") – Elite (1986)
- "Personal Column" / "Dancing In Outer Space" (12") – Elite (1986)
- "Personal Column" / "Dancing In Outer Space" (12", Promo, W/Lbl, Sta) – Elite (1986)
- "Kickin' It" (12") – JamToday (1988)
- "Planet Mental (Outa This World)" / "Dancing In Outer Space" (12") – JamToday (1989)
- "Dancing In Outer Space" (12", W/Lbl, Sta) – Chemical Discs (1991)
- "The Re-Entry XP" (12") – Chemical Discs (1991)
- Dancing In Outer Space (The Finest Hour) (album) – Jump Cut (1995)
- "Altered Slates – Part Five" (12") – Disorient (1997)
- "Dancing In Outer Space (The Masters At Work Remixes)" (various formats) – Disorient (1997) - UK number 82
- "Altered Slates Part Three (François K Remixes)" (12") – Disorient (1998)
- "Invasion" (12") – Discfunction (1998)
- "Motivation (Dimitri From Paris Remixes)" (12") - Disorient (1998)
- "Motivation (Dimitri From Paris Remixes) (2x12", W/Lbl, Ltd) – Disorient (1998)
- Altered Slates (album) – Disorient (1999)
- Dancing In Outer Space (album) – Castle Music (2000)
- "Dancing In Outer Space" (12") – Castle Music (2001)
- "Ichi Sampler EP" (12", EP) – Disorient (2002)
- En Trance (album) – Discothèque (2) (2005)
- "DIOS:2020" (single) - Atmosfear (2020)
