= 11 Diagonal Street =

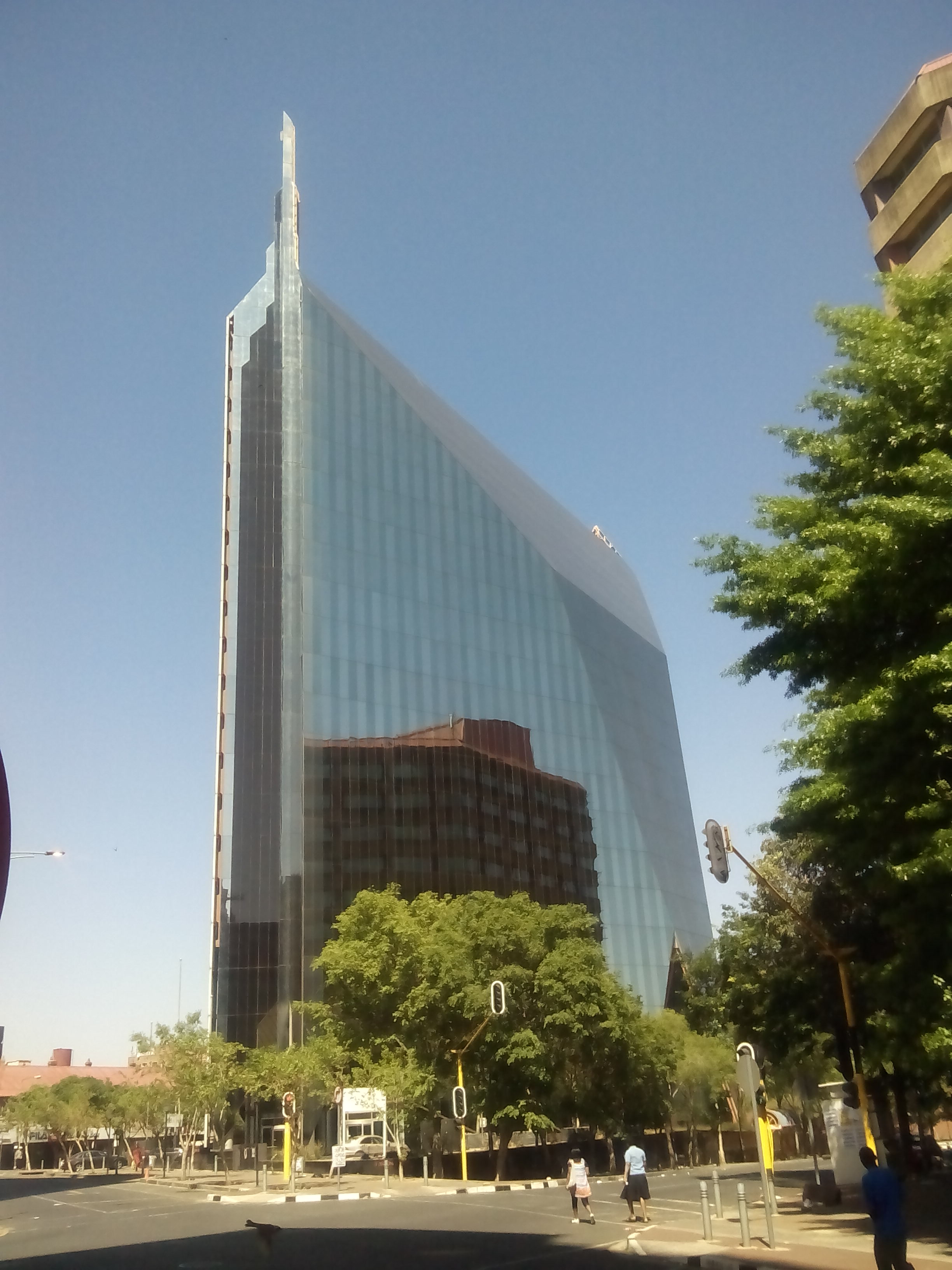
- A view of the building from street level
- Interactive map of the 11 Diagonal Street area

General information
- Status: Completed
- Type: Multi use, Office
- Location: Johannesburg, South Africa
- Coordinates: 26°12′15″S 28°2′9″E
- Construction started: 1981
- Completed: 1983
- Opening: 1984
- Cost: R65 million
- Owner: Rebosis Property Fund

Height
- Antenna spire: 80 m (260 ft)
- Roof: 75 m (246 ft)
- Top floor: 75 m (246 ft)

Technical details
- Floor count: 20
- Floor area: 20,000 m^{2} (220,000 sq ft)
- Lifts/elevators: 6

Design and construction
- Architect: Helmut Jahn

11 Diagonal Street (also known as the diamond building) is an iconic office tower in downtown Johannesburg, South Africa, that was built by Anglo American Property Services. The 22 floor building is the 15th tallest in the city.

The building's architect was Helmut Jahn. It was conceptualized in 1981 and excavations began in December that year. Construction ended in 1983 and the building was tenanted in 1984. The building is designed to look like a diamond as it reflects different views of the Central Business District from each angle of the building. Apart from its unique exterior, the structure was built with concrete instead of steel, demonstrating that concrete could be used instead of steel in both speed and cost.

The building is shown on the album cover for The Very Best of Level 42.

== Current use ==
The building was used by the department of Development Planning & Local Government. It is currently occupied by The Gauteng Department of Infrastructure Development.
