= One Man (Mark King album) =

Studio album by Mark King
- Released: 28 September 1998 (UK)
- Genre: Rock
- Length: 42:11
- Label: Virgin
- Producer: Paul Taylor

Mark King chronology
Influences (1984)	One Man (1998)

Professional ratings
Review scores
Source	Rating
AllMusic	4/5 stars

One Man is the second solo studio album by the English musician Mark King, bassist and vocalist of Level 42. It was released in September 1998, more than 14 years after King's previous solo album, Influences. It includes songs co-written by King and Level 42's former guitarist, Boon Gould.

== Track listing ==
All tracks composed by Mark King and Boon Gould; except where indicated.

1. "Bitter Moon" – 4:06
2. "Swimming with Sky" – 4:47
3. "One Man" – 5:22
4. "Half Written Songs" – 4:17
5. "Pamela" (Mark King) – 2:20
6. "Take My Hand" – 4:34
7. "Love Wars" – 4:15
8. "Resupply" – 3:55
9. "If I Had Something..." – 3:51
10. "Changing the Guard" (Mark King) – 4:47

== Personnel ==
- Mark King – vocals, bass guitar, guitars and synthesizers
- Lyndon Connah – Rhodes and acoustic piano
- Paul Taylor – Rhodes, acoustic piano, synthesizers and programming
- Milton MacDonald – guitars
- Mark Jaimes – guitars
- Chester Kamen – guitar
- Gary Barnacle – alto and soprano saxophone
- Geoff Dugmore – drums and percussion
- Paul Brown – bass (2, 6, 8, 10)
- Miles Bould – percussion
- Nicky Brown – backing vocals
- Andy Caine – backing vocals
