= The Chinese Way =

1983 single by Level 42

Single by Level 42

from the album The Pursuit of Accidents
- B-side: "88" (live)
- Released: 7 January 1983
- Genre: Jazz fusion
- Length: 3:57 (single); 5:51 (album)
- Label: Polydor
- Songwriters: Mark King; Phil Gould; Wally Badarou
- Producer: Mike Vernon

Level 42 singles chronology
"Weave Your Spell" (1982)	"The Chinese Way" (1983)	"Out of Sight, Out of Mind" (1983)

"The Chinese Way" is a single released in 1983 by the English jazz-funk band Level 42. It was the third single from their third studio album, The Pursuit of Accidents, which was the band's most successful album up to that time. It was Level 42's first top-30 single in the United Kingdom.

== Charts ==
Chart (1983)	Peak position
Belgium (Ultratop 50 Flanders)	35
Ireland (IRMA)	27
Netherlands (Single Top 100)	45
UK Singles (OCC)	24
