= Running in the Family (song) =

1987 single by Level 42

Single by Level 42

from the album Running in the Family
- Released: 2 February 1987
- Recorded: 1986
- Genre: R&B; jazz-funk; rock; new wave
- Length: 3:57 (7" edit); 6:12 (album version)
- Label: Polydor
- Songwriters: Mark King; Wally Badarou; Phil Gould
- Producers: Wally Badarou; Level 42

Level 42 singles chronology
"World Machine" (1986)	"Running in the Family" (1987)	"To Be with You Again" (1987)

Music video
- "Running in the Family" on YouTube

"Running in the Family" is a single by the English jazz-funk band Level 42, released on 2 February 1987 by Polydor Records, from their seventh studio album Running in the Family. It was then popped up for the release of the single which had significant success, reaching No. 6 on the UK singles chart No. 9 in New Zealand, and No. 83 on the US Billboard Hot 100. It was part of a series of single successes by the group and brought Level 42 fame in countries where they were previously little-known, such as the United States, Germany and Norway.

== Music video ==
The music video was recorded on a multi-coloured platform, which rotated in the same manner as a vinyl record. It features all the contemporary members of the band: Mark King, Mike Lindup, Boon Gould and Phil Gould. The musicians take turns in switching between "active" when they are performing, and "inactive", where they stand perfectly still as if a colored statue, when they are not. The video was directed by Stuart Orme and produced by Wally Badarou.

== Track listing ==
=== 7": Polydor / POSP 842 (UK) ===
1. "Running in the Family" – 3:57
2. "Dream Crazy" – 3:50

=== 12": Polydor / POSPX 842 (UK) ===
1. "Running in the Family" (extended version) – 6:10
2. "Dream Crazy" – 3:50
3. "Running in the Family" (7" version) – 3:57
- also available on German CD single (Polydor / 885 518-2)

=== 12": Polydor / POSXX 842 (UK) ===
1. "Running in the Family" (extended version) – 6:10
2. "Dream Crazy" – 3:50
3. "Running in the Family" (7" version) – 3:57
4. "World Machine" (Shep Pettibone remix) – 5:39
5. "World Machine" (dub) – 5:00
- Limited edition 2x12" release

== Charts ==
=== Weekly charts ===
Weekly chart performance for "Running in the Family"
Chart (1987)	Peak position
Australia (Kent Music Report)	43
Austria (Ö3 Austria Top 40)	12
Belgium (Ultratop 50 Flanders)	3
Denmark (Hitlisten)	1
Europe (Eurochart Hot 100)	1
France (IFOP)	26
Germany (GfK)	12
Ireland (IRMA)	4
Israel (IBA)	1
Italy (FIMI)	10
Italy Airplay (Music & Media)	11
Netherlands (Dutch Top 40)	3
Netherlands (Single Top 100)	3
New Zealand (Recorded Music NZ)	9
Norway (VG-lista)	7
Spain (AFYVE)	4
Sweden (Sverigetopplistan)	12
Switzerland (Schweizer Hitparade)	5
UK Singles (Official Charts)	6
US Billboard Hot 100	83

=== Year-end charts ===
1987 year-end chart performance for "Running in the Family"
Chart (1987)	Position
Belgium (Ultratop Flanders)	27
European Top 100 Singles (Music & Media)	32
Netherlands (Dutch Top 40)	25
Netherlands (Single Top 100)	22
New Zealand (Recorded Music NZ)	50
Switzerland (Schweizer Hitparade)	29
UK Singles (OCC)	69

== Cover versions ==
In 2007, Spanish singer José Galisteo covered the song on his debut studio album Remember.
