= Running in the Family =

Studio album by Level 42
- Released: 16 March 1987
- Recorded: 1986
- Studios: Sarm West (London); Maison Rouge (London)
- Genre: Sophisti-pop
- Length: 43:01 (LP); 49:18 (CD/cassette)
- Label: Polydor
- Producers: Wally Badarou, Level 42

Level 42 chronology
World Machine (1985)	Running in the Family (1987)	Staring at the Sun (1988)

Singles from Running in the Family
- 1. "Lessons in Love" Released: 14 April 1986; 2. "Running in the Family" Released: 2 February 1987; 3. "To Be with You Again" Released: 13 April 1987; 4. "It's Over" Released: 1 September 1987; 5. "Children Say" Released: 30 November 1987

Professional ratings
Review scores
Source	Rating
AllMusic	3/5 stars
Record Mirror	(Indifferent)
Rolling Stone	(favorable)

Running in the Family is the seventh studio album by British band Level 42, released in 1987. It features the UK hit singles: "Lessons in Love" (which reached No. 3 in May 1986), "Running in the Family" (No. 6 in February 1987), "To Be with You Again" (No. 10 in April '87), "It's Over" (No. 10, in September 1987) and "Children Say" (No. 22 at the end of 1987). All five singles peaked in the Top 10 in the Netherlands. "Lessons in Love" peaked at No. 1 in Germany, South Africa, Switzerland and Denmark. This was the last Level 42 album of the 1980s to feature brothers Phil (drums) (until Forever Now in 1994) and Boon Gould (guitar) (until his guest appearance on Retroglide in 2006) who had cited dissatisfaction with the musical direction of the band and exhaustion as departure reasons.

Later in 1987, the Platinum Edition of the album was issued. The CD and cassette versions replaced "Lessons in Love", "Running in the Family" and "It's Over" with remixed versions, and added remixes of "Something About You" and "World Machine" from Level 42's previous album. On vinyl, the remixes were featured on one 33 rpm record which was shrink-wrapped to the standard edition of the album.

Also in 1987, the group released the video collection Family of Five (with the music videos of the five singles from Running in the Family) exclusively in the United Kingdom.

== Commercial performance ==
Running in the Family was an international success, reaching the Top 10 in numerous countries and the Top 25 in the US; in the UK, it was certified 2× Platinum by the BPI.

== Remaster ==
In 2012, the album was remastered and re-released to celebrate the 25th anniversary of its original release.

== Track listing ==
Side one

1. "Lessons in Love" (Wally Badarou, Rowland Gould, Mark King) – 4:04
2. "Children Say" (King, Mike Lindup, Phil Gould) – 4:53
3. "Running in the Family" (P. Gould, Badarou, King) – 6:12
4. "It's Over" (King, R. Gould, Badarou) – 6:02

Side two

1. "To Be with You Again" (King, R. Gould) – 5:19
2. "Two Solitudes" (King, P. Gould, Lindup) – 5:37
3. "Fashion Fever" (King, R. Gould) – 4:35
4. "The Sleepwalkers" (King, P. Gould) – 6:02

CD/cassette bonus track

9. "Freedom Someday" (King, P. Gould, R. Gould, Lindup) – 6:20

=== Platinum edition bonus LP ===
Side one

1. "Lessons in Love" (Shep Pettibone Remix) – 7:44
2. "Running in the Family" (Dave 'O' Remix) – 6:37
3. "It's Over" (Remix) – 6:00

Side two

1. "Something About You" (Shep Pettibone Remix) – 8:03
2. "World Machine" (Shep Pettibone Remix) – 5:39

=== 2000 reissue bonus tracks ===
10. "Lessons in Love" (Shep's Final Mix) – 5:45
11. "Children Say" (Slap Bass Mix) – 4:49
12. "To Be with You Again" (A.D.S.C. Mix) – 5:45
13. "Running in the Family" (HTL Dub) – 6:11

== Personnel ==
=== Level 42 ===
- Mark King – lead vocals, bass guitar
- Mike Lindup – keyboards, backing vocals, lead vocals on "Two Solitudes"
- Rowland “Boon” Gould – guitars
- Phil Gould – drums

=== Additional musicians ===
- Wally Badarou – keyboards, backing vocals
- Gary Barnacle – saxophone ("Lessons in Love")
- Krys Mach – saxophone ("Running in the Family")
- Julian Mendelsohn – additional backing vocals ("The Sleepwalkers")

=== Production ===
- Level 42 – producers
- Wally Badarou – producer
- Julian Mendelsohn – production assistant, engineer, mixing
- Nicholas Froome – basic track recording (1, 2)
- Carlos Olms – digital engineer
- Mike "Spike" Drake – technician
- Kevin Metcalfe – mastering
- The Town House (London) – mastering location
- Eric Watson – photography

== Charts ==
=== Weekly charts ===
Weekly chart performance for Running in the Family
Chart (1987–1988)	Peak position
Australian Albums (Kent Music Report)	35
Austrian Albums (Ö3 Austria)	4
Canada Top Albums/CDs (RPM)	6
Dutch Albums (Album Top 100)	3
German Albums (Offizielle Top 100)	4
New Zealand Albums (RMNZ)	3
Norwegian Albums (VG-lista)	4
Swedish Albums (Sverigetopplistan)	6
Swiss Albums (Schweizer Hitparade)	4
UK Albums (Official Charts)	2
US Billboard 200	23

=== Year-end charts ===
Year-end chart performance for Running in the Family
Chart (1987)	Position
Canada Top Albums/CDs (RPM)	23
Dutch Albums (Album Top 100)	15
German Albums (Offizielle Top 100)	15
New Zealand Albums (RMNZ)	23
Swiss Albums (Schweizer Hitparade)	15

=== Singles ===
Chart performance for singles from Running in the Family
Year	Song	Chart	Peak position
1986	"Lessons in Love"	UK Singles Chart	3
1986	"Lessons in Love"	Australia (Kent Music Report)	65
1986	"Lessons in Love"	Billboard Hot 100	12
1986	"Lessons in Love"	Netherlands	2
1986	"Lessons in Love"	Germany	1
1986	"Lessons in Love"	Ireland	3
1987	"Running in the Family"	UK Singles Chart	6
1987	"Running in the Family"	Australia (Kent Music Report)	43
1987	"Running in the Family"	Billboard Hot 100	83
1987	"Running in the Family"	Ireland	4
1987	"Running in the Family"	Netherlands	3
1987	"To Be with You Again"	UK Singles Chart	10
1987	"To Be with You Again"	Netherlands	6
1987	"It's Over"	UK Singles Chart	10
1987	"It's Over"	Ireland	3
1987	"It's Over"	Netherlands	7
1987	"Children Say"	UK Singles Chart	22
1987	"Children Say"	Netherlands	9

== Certifications ==
Certifications for Running in the Family
Region	Certification	Certified units/sales
Denmark (IFPI Danmark)	Gold	50,000^{^}
Canada (Music Canada)	Platinum	100,000^{^}
Germany (BVMI)	Gold	250,000^{^}
Netherlands (NVPI)	Platinum	100,000^{^}
New Zealand (RMNZ)	Gold	7,500^{^}
Spain (Promusicae)	Gold	50,000^{^}
Switzerland (IFPI Switzerland)	Gold	25,000^{^}
United Kingdom (BPI)	2× Platinum	600,000^{^}
^{^} Shipments figures based on certification alone.
