= Love Games (Level 42 song) =

Single by Level 42

from the album Level 42
- B-side: "Forty Two"
- Released: 27 March 1981
- Genre: Jazz fusion; funk
- Length: 4:04
- Label: Polydor
- Songwriters: Mark King; Phil Gould
- Producer: Mike Vernon

Level 42 singles chronology
| "(Flying on The) Wings of Love" (1980) | "Love Games" (1981) | "Turn It On" (1981) |

"Love Games" is a song by the English jazz-funk band Level 42, released as the first single from the act's eponymous debut album. It was also their first single to break into the UK top 40, reaching number 38 in the spring of 1981 and resulted in their first appearance on Top of the Pops.

== Track listing ==
UK (Polydor; POSP 234) picture sleeve

- A. "Love Games" (edit) – 4:04
- B. "Forty-Two" (edit) – 4:36

== Charts ==
=== Weekly charts ===
| Chart (1980–1981) | Peak position |
|---|---|
| Belgium (Ultratop 50 Flanders) | 15 |
| Netherlands (Dutch Top 40) | 7 |
| Netherlands (Single Top 100) | 4 |
| UK Singles (OCC) | 38 |

=== Year-end charts ===
| Chart (1981) | Position |
|---|---|
| Netherlands (Dutch Top 40) | 86 |
| Netherlands (Single Top 100) | 55 |
