= Boon Gould =

English musician (1955–2019)

- Born: Rowland Charles Gould; 4 March 1955; Shanklin, Isle of Wight, England
- Died: 30 April 2019 (aged 64) Uffculme, Devon, England
- Genres: Jazz-funk; new wave
- Occupations: Guitarist; songwriter
- Instrument: Guitar
- Years active: 1979–2019
- Label: Universal
- Formerly of: Level 42

Rowland Charles "Boon" Gould (4 March 1955 – 30 April 2019) was an English musician and one of the four founding members of Level 42.

== Career ==
Gould was born in Shanklin on the Isle of Wight. He was the guitarist of Level 42 and an occasional saxophone player on their earliest albums. Boon was the brother of Phil Gould, who was the drummer and also a founding member of Level 42. Gould's tenure as a full-time member of Level 42 ended in 1987 after a period of sustained illness and nervous exhaustion, culminating in him suffering from panic attacks whilst onstage. He continued writing lyrics with the band and was present during studio work for the Staring at the Sun album in 1988.

Gould released two solo studio albums: Tin Man and Love Kills Overtime, the second under the pseudonym 'Zen Gangsters'. The second studio album used a number of his brother's drums samples from his later work with Level 42.

Gould maintained a relationship with lead vocalist and bassist Mark King, who was occasionally seen attending King's concerts in the late 1990s and early 2000s. Gould provided lyrics for King's second solo studio album One Man (1998) and the full 2004 reunion of the band was officially announced on his website, although this reunion was very brief.

Gould provided lyrics, some guitar work, and some music for Level 42's eleventh studio album Retroglide (2006), although he and King had an agreement that Gould was credited solely for lyrics and King solely for music.

In 2018, Gould made his last recording when he contributed a guitar solo to his brother Phil's album Beautiful Wounds, on a track called "The Russian Submariner".

== Reunions ==
In October 2012, Gould joined his longtime bandmates and friends, Mark King and Mike Lindup, for a one off guest appearance in Bristol. Gould performed alongside the band for the songs "Heathrow" and "Love Games". Although Gould had a lot of writing involvement with Level 42 after the dissolution of the original line-up, the Bristol show marked his first public appearance with Level 42 in 25 years. Gould's appearance also coincided with King's birthday.

== Death ==
Gould was found dead at a friend's home in Uffculme, Devon on 30 April 2019, aged 64. A coroner's inquest found the death was suicide by hanging. Boon had suffered from bipolar disorder throughout his life.

== Discography ==
=== Solo ===
- 1995: Tinman
- 2000: Love Kills Overtime (recorded as Zen Gangsters)

=== With Level 42 ===
- 1981: Level 42
- 1982: The Early Tapes
- 1982: The Pursuit of Accidents
- 1983: Standing in the Light
- 1984: True Colours
- 1985: World Machine
- 1987: Running in the Family
- 2006: Retroglide

=== With Phil Gould ===
- 2009: Watertight
- 2021: Beautiful Wounds
