= Level 42 =

English jazz-funk band

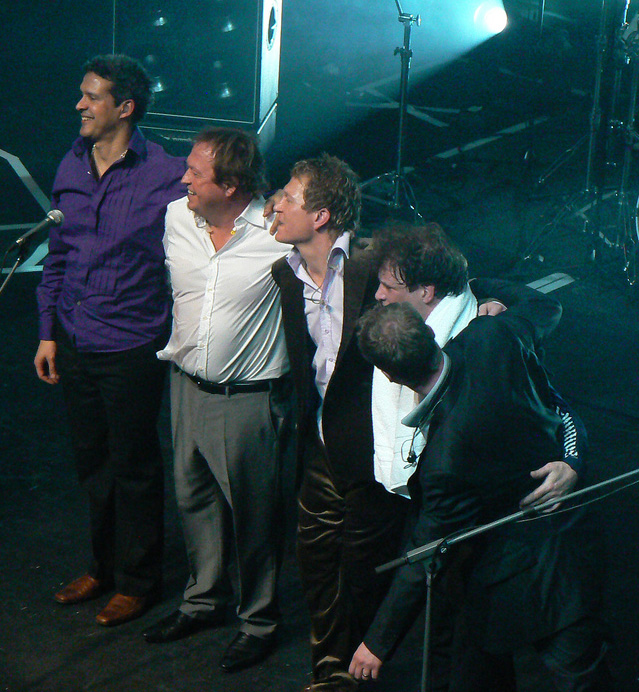
- Level 42 in 2009

Background information
- Origin: Isle of Wight, England
- Genres: Jazz-funk; sophisti-pop; dance-rock; new wave; synth-pop
- Works: Level 42 discography
- Years active: 1979–1994; 2001–present
- Labels: Polydor; RCA; W14/Universal; Level42
- Spinoff of: M
- Members: Mark King; Mike Lindup; Nathan King; Pete Ray Biggin; Dan Carpenter; Sean Freeman; Nichol Thomson
- Past members: Phil Gould; Rowland 'Boon' Gould; Gary Husband; Alan Murphy
- Website: level42.com

Level 42 are an English jazz-funk band formed on the Isle of Wight in 1979. They had a number of UK and worldwide hits during the 1980s and 1990s.

Level 42's highest-charting single in the UK was "Lessons in Love", which reached number three on the UK singles chart, and number 12 on the US Billboard Hot 100 chart, upon its release in 1986. An earlier single, "Something About You", was their most successful chart-wise in the United States, reaching number 7 on the Billboard Hot 100 chart.

After much success as a live and studio band in the 1980s, Level 42's commercial profile diminished during the early 1990s following a series of personnel changes and musical shifts. Disbanding in 1994, the band reformed in 2001.

== History ==
=== 1979–1980: Prehistory and formation ===
Mark King and the Gould brothers (Phil and Rowland, the latter generally known by his nickname Boon) were all brought up on the Isle of Wight and played together in various bands during their teenage years. Phil Gould went on to study at London's Guildhall School of Music and Drama, where he met keyboard player Mike Lindup in a percussion course. Both musicians found that they had the same feelings about musical heroes: Miles Davis, John McLaughlin, Keith Jarrett and Jan Hammer.

By 1979, Phil Gould and Mark King were both based in London and became involved in Robin Scott's pop project M. While working with M, they became acquainted with Afro-French keyboard player Wally Badarou, who played synthesizer on M's US number one single "Pop Muzik". In late 1979, Phil Gould introduced Mark King and Mike Lindup to each other, and all of them began playing together in loose rehearsal sessions, developing their own jazz-funk fusion style. The developing band's original guitarist was Dominic Miller (later to find fame playing with Sting), but he was replaced by Boon Gould on the latter's return from working in the United States.

Initially, instrumental roles were flexible, with Boon Gould also playing bass guitar and saxophone and Lindup doubling on keyboards and drums. Mark King was primarily a drummer (although he also played guitar) but had recently sold his drum kit to pay for transport back to the UK after an ill-fated European venture. With Phil Gould and Boon Gould established (respectively) as the most accomplished drummer and guitarist in the quartet, King opted to learn bass guitar instead. At the time, King was working in a London music shop. A flexible musician and quick learner, he had observed visiting American funk players demonstrating the thumb-slap bass guitar technique and developed his own take on the style in a matter of weeks.

The developing band (at this point, entirely an instrumental act) took the name Level 42 and settled on a working line-up of King (bass guitar, percussion), Lindup (keyboards, percussion), Boon Gould (guitar, saxophone) and Phil Gould (drums). The name of the band is a reference to the novel The Hitchhiker's Guide to the Galaxy by Douglas Adams, in which "42" is the answer to "the ultimate question of life, the universe, and everything." Having maintained their links with Wally Badarou, Phil Gould and Mark King invited him to work with Level 42. Although he never formally joined the band, Badarou would become a fifth member in all but name: co-writing songs, playing keyboards and synthesizers in the studio and co-producing the records.

=== 1980–1983: Early albums (Level 42, The Early Tapes, The Pursuit of Accidents) ===
After they were seen jamming together, Level 42 were invited to sign to Elite Records (a small independent label) in 1980. They were also encouraged to branch out into vocal music. Having considered recruiting a singer, the band eventually settled on giving King and Lindup the vocal role. The two men developed a complementary style, with Lindup's falsetto frequently used for harmonies and choruses while King's deep tenor led the verses (although Lindup would also sing entire songs on his own). Lyrics were generally written by the Gould brothers while King, Badarou and Lindup concentrated on Level 42's music.

The Elite Records single "Love Meeting Love" brought the band to the attention of Polydor Records, with whom they signed their second recording contract. In 1981, they released their first Polydor single, "Love Games", which became a Top 40 hit. They then cut their critically acclaimed self-titled debut album, which was a success throughout Europe. That same year, the band played as a support act for The Police during their tour in Germany.

The band played on the British and European jazz-funk scene. Polydor released a second album, The Early Tapes, later in the same year. This was a compilation of material from the Elite Records period, and is also known by an alternate name, Strategy.

In 1982, Level 42 released their third album The Pursuit of Accidents. Their album combined instrumental jazz-funk with more pop-oriented songs. Both of the singles from the album — "Weave Your Spell" and "The Chinese Way" — charted. The latter reached the UK Top 40, bringing the band to a wider audience.

=== 1983–1985: Moving towards pop (Standing in the Light and True Colours) ===
A fourth album, Standing in the Light, was released in 1983. Produced by Larry Dunn and Verdine White (of Earth, Wind and & Fire), this album included fewer jazz elements and had more pop-oriented songs than previous releases. It provided them with their first UK Top Ten hit, "The Sun Goes Down (Living It Up)". The album featured no instrumental tracks, with the band now focusing on vocal tracks.

The 1984 album True Colours included jazz-funk based music, switching between funk, power pop, mid-tempo rock and ballads. It yielded the singles "The Chant Has Begun" and "Hot Water". The latter was a Top 20 hit in Britain and a Top 5 hit in the Netherlands (the song also reached No. 7 in Belgium). During the same year, Mark King released his first solo album Influences on which he played most instruments (with a guest appearance by Aswad's Drummie Zeb, and with Lindup guesting on additional keyboards).

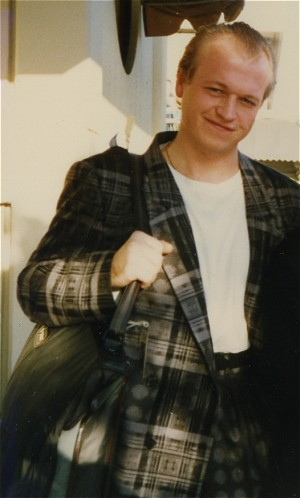
Mark King in 1986

Level 42 toured regularly and released the double live album A Physical Presence. For live gigs the band added saxophonist Krys Mach, who toured with the group from 1984 to 1988 and contributed to some album recordings.

=== 1985–1987: Worldwide fame (World Machine and Running in the Family) and split of original line-up ===
Level 42 released their next album, World Machine, in 1985. The album included pop and rock songs, such as "Something About You" and "Leaving Me Now", which were both UK Top 20 hits and Top 40 hits in the Netherlands.

"Something About You" was also their first (and only) US Top 10 the following year; also reaching the Top 5 in Canada and the Top 20 in Italy and New Zealand. "Leaving Me Now" was the second hit from this album, peaking at No. 15 in the United Kingdom but proving less successful in the rest of Europe.

World Machine gained positive reviews from critics, with AllMusic journalist William Cooper, in a retrospective review, describing it as "one of the finest pop albums of the mid-'80s." During the recording of the album, the first major tensions between Phil Gould and Mark King began to surface over musical direction, production and their personal relationship. This clashing led to Gould leaving the band for a week. Allan Holdsworth's drummer Gary Husband was lined up as a potential replacement, but Gould and King's dispute was subsequently patched up and the group went on to enjoy their most successful year to date.

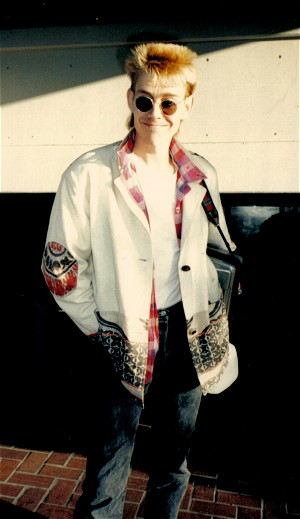
Phil Gould in 1986

Released in early 1986 (and initially recorded to keep up the band's European chart momentum while the band was busy touring the United States), "Lessons in Love" was an international hit and became Level 42's biggest selling single. It gave the band their first number one in Denmark, Germany, Switzerland and South Africa, increasing the band's popularity considerably. It also placed at No. 2 in Italy, the Netherlands and Sweden, No. 3 in the UK and in Ireland, No. 4 in Austria, No. 10 in Norway, No. 12 in the US in 1987, No. 18 in New Zealand and No. 22 in France). In October 1986, the band served as the opening act for Steve Winwood.

"Lessons in Love" became the lead single on 1987's Running in the Family album, recorded to capitalise on the impact. With the band now at the peak of their success, the album added further gloss to Level 42's polished pop sound (despite adding to Phil Gould's disquiet). Further singles from the album continued and built on the band's existing profile: "To Be With You Again" (No. 6 in the Netherlands and in Ireland), the ballad "It's Over" (No. 3 in Ireland and No. 7 in the Netherlands) and Running In The Family's title track (No. 1 in Denmark, No. 3 in the Netherlands, No. 4 in Ireland, No. 5 in Switzerland, No. 7 in Norway and No. 9 in New Zealand). The album itself was a major international success, reaching the Top 10 in numerous countries.

By now a leading British pop band, Level 42 played at the Prince's Trust concert in June 1987, with Eric Clapton standing in on lead guitar for a performance of "Running in the Family". King and Lindup also performed with artists including Ben E. King on "Stand By Me" and George Harrison and Ringo Starr on "While My Guitar Gently Weeps".

Despite the success, Level 42 were on the brink of splitting up. Although Phil Gould was the most visibly dissatisfied member, it was Boon Gould who was the first to leave, departing in late 1987, following a support slot on a Madonna tour. Boon surprised both King and Lindup with his sudden departure. He had been suffering from nervous exhaustion and also wanted to leave the lifestyle of a constantly touring musician in order to settle down and spend more time with his wife and children. Boon's relationship with the band remained amicable and, although he would not return to Level 42 as a performing or recording member, he continued to write lyrics for the band following his departure. He was temporarily replaced by Paul Gendler (an experienced session player who had previously been the guitarist for Modern Romance) for a six-week headlining tour and for further support slots with Tina Turner.

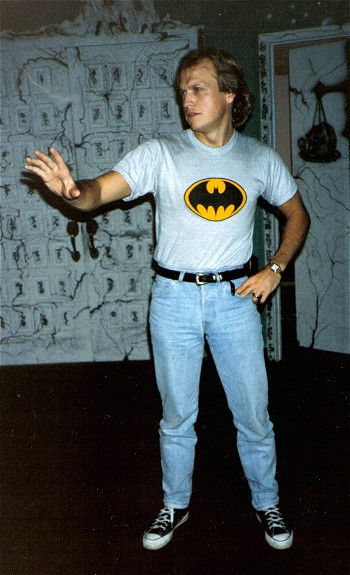
Mark King in 1987

In December 1987, midway through the tour, Phil Gould left Level 42 permanently. Like his brother, he was suffering from exhaustion, but his relationship with King had broken down once again and they now found it difficult to work together. Phil was also reportedly dissatisfied with the band's direction in terms of their newer "pop" sound, and King and Lindup failed to convince him to stay. To complete the tour dates, the band hired Prefab Sprout drummer Neil Conti to fill in.

=== 1987–1990: The second line-up (Staring at the Sun) ===
Following the tour, Level 42 recruited Gary Husband as the band's new full-time drummer. He in turn recommended Steve Topping as a replacement guitarist. However, Topping and King's personalities clashed and Topping eventually left the band in early 1988 after initial writing and rehearsing sessions in Dublin. Most of the next Level 42 album, Staring at the Sun, was recorded without a permanent guitarist. Rhythm guitar on the studio recordings was handled either by the band's old friend Dominic Miller or by an uncredited Mark King. In April 1988, towards the end of the sessions, the band recruited lead guitarist Alan Murphy (a session guitarist who had worked extensively with Kate Bush and had also been a member of Go West).

Staring at the Sun was released in 1988, reaching number 2 in the UK and the top ten in several European charts. It included the hit-single "Heaven in My Hands" (number 12 in the UK and also top twenty in the Netherlands, Norway, Switzerland). Boon Gould had co-written many of the tracks with King, Lindup and Badarou, while Gary Husband was credited with his first co-write with King on "Tracie" (a tribute to King's childhood sweetheart). To promote the album, Level 42 embarked on a four-month European tour, culminating in six sell-out nights at Wembley Arena. These latter dates were recorded for what would become the band's second live album, Live At Wembley (eventually released in 1996).

Although the band seemed to have maintained their momentum and recovered well from the split of the original lineup, they were about to be hit by a serious tragedy. Unknown to the rest of Level 42, guitarist Alan Murphy was suffering from AIDS, something which he himself may have been aware of before joining the band. At the time, his previous band Go West had been stalled by internal disagreements, and one of Murphy's reasons for joining Level 42 was to ensure that he spent his last days playing the music that he loved. During 1989, Murphy contracted pneumonia: weakened by his existing condition, his decline was rapid and he died on 19 October 1989.

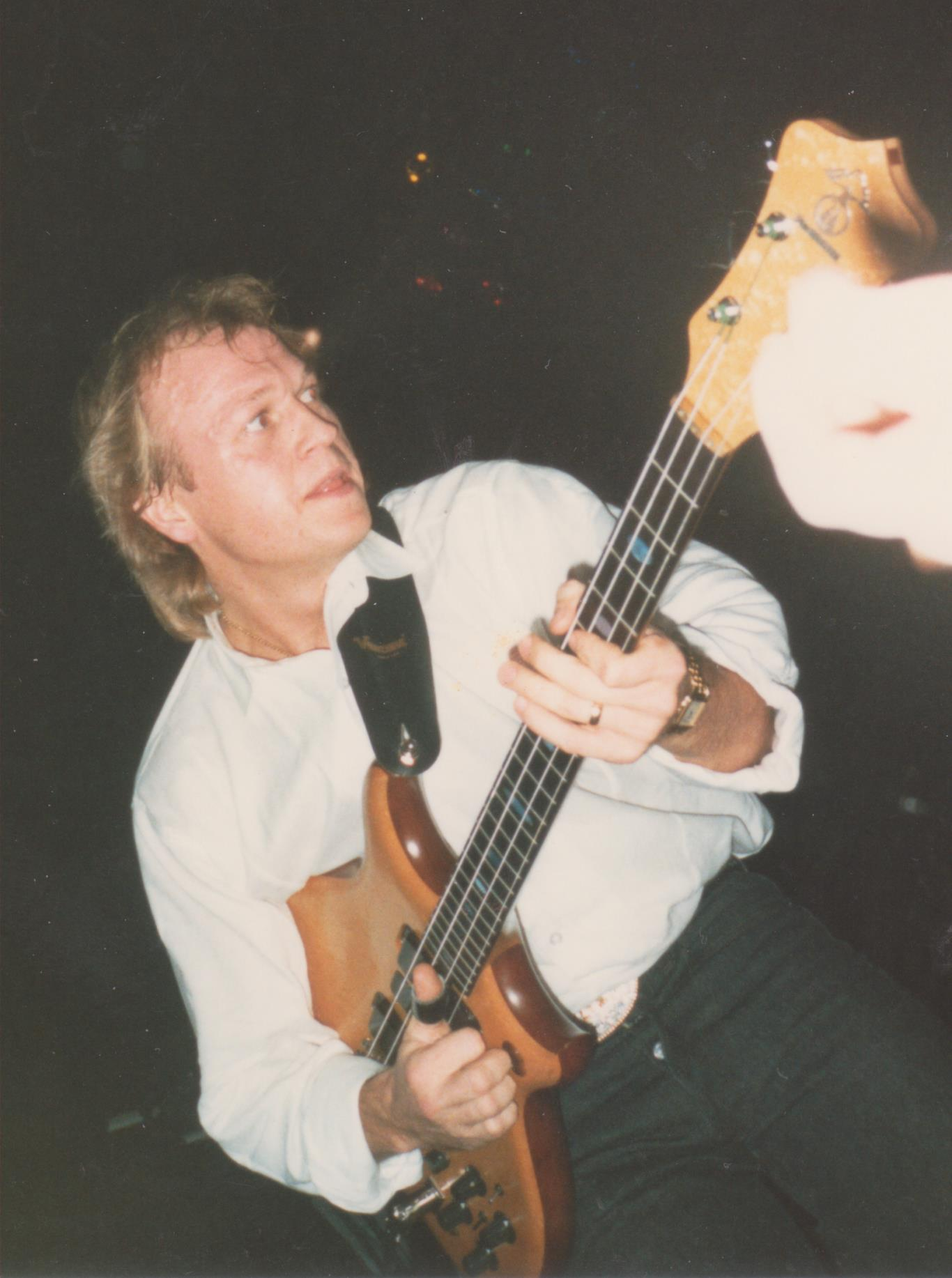
Mark King performing in 1988

Devastated, Level 42 took a year off to regroup and rethink. To cover the gap and to fulfil the band's contract with Polydor Records, Level Best (a greatest hits compilation) was released at the end of 1989; also marking a decade since the band's beginnings. During the break, Mike Lindup also recorded and released his debut solo album, Changes (featuring Dominic Miller, Pino Palladino on bass and Manu Katché on drums).

=== 1990–1993: Third and fourth lineups – Guaranteed album, Allan Holdsworth and Jakko Jakszyk ===
In 1990 the band signed a new contract with RCA Records, for whom they produced their next album, Guaranteed. Most of the rhythm-guitar work was once again handled by Dominic Miller, but Gary Husband asked Allan Holdsworth to provide some guitar work (notably on "A Kinder Eye"). As well as drumming, Husband also played keyboards and increased his songwriting role, co-writing many tracks with King, Lindup and Badarou. The album features the only track entirely written by Husband: "If You Were Mine", which also featured on the "Guaranteed" single release. Mark King also collaborated with lyricists Drew Barfield and George Green to expand the songwriting. Guaranteed was well received by American music critics. However, the album did not get good reviews in the UK (despite reaching No. 3 in the UK charts while the title track reached No. 17 in the singles charts) and was ultimately less commercially successful than previous efforts.

In December 1990, Level 42 returned to play a record run of concerts at Hammersmith Odeon, London, in part fulfilling booking obligations preceding the band's recent hiatus. The concerts featured Allan Holdsworth (whom Husband had asked to play as a favour while the band searched for a permanent guitarist) plus four additional players: Lyndon Connah (ex-64 Spoons) on additional keyboards and percussion and sharing backing vocals with Annie McCaig, plus the horn section from the Guaranteed album (John Thirkell and Gary Barnacle).

After the recording of Guaranteed and a week-long promotional tour, Level 42 were in need of a permanent guitarist. Mark King assumed (erroneously) that Allan Holdsworth would not be interested in taking the position. Instead the band recruited well-respected art-pop guitarist, session player and sometime solo artist Jakko Jakszyk: the former frontman for 64 Spoons, he'd also collaborated with Tom Robinson, Sam Brown and Stewart/Gaskin among others. Although he did not play on Guaranteed, Jakszyk appeared on the album's cover photo and took part in promotional duties and the tour for the album, as well as playing on two B-sides from this era ("At This Great Distance" and "As Years Go By"). Unlike Husband, Jakszyk never became a full legal member of the band (apparently due to "record company politics").

Following the end of promotion for Guaranteed, the King-Lindup-Husband-Jakszyk line-up began writing and recording new material together, with at least two songs ("Fire" and "Free Your Soul") completed. Following the next development in the band's history, this work was shelved and remains unreleased.

=== 1993–1995: Fifth and sixth lineups (including brief return of Phil Gould), Forever Now and disbandment ===
In early 1993, Gary Husband left Level 42, leading to the return of group founder member Phil Gould as Level 42's drummer (and principal lyricist) for 1994's Forever Now album. Further changes to the band were evident in that Jakko Jakszyk did not play on the album: all guitars were performed by the American session guitarist Danny Blume (erroneously credited as "Danny Bloom").

Although Forever Now was a critical success, the reunion of Gould and the group was short-lived. When Level 42 began to promote the new album (with Jakszyk returning to the live band for concerts and TV appearances), Gould played only one promotional gig and did not go on the road for the Forever Now tour. He was replaced as live drummer by Jakszyk's friend and frequent collaborator Gavin Harrison (who later played drums for both Porcupine Tree and King Crimson as well as remaining an esteemed studio player).

It was announced halfway through the Forever Now tour, on the day of the Manchester Apollo gig, that the band would be disbanding permanently following their concert commitments. Level 42 played their last gig at the Albert Hall in London on 14 October 1994. According to Jakszyk, the band recorded tapes for a live album during the final 1994 shows at the Albert Hall and the Brighton Dome which "sounded fantastic", but the album was never released.

=== 1995–2001: Mark King's solo years ===
In 1996, Mark King signed to Virgin Records and released a solo single "Bitter Moon" (with Lyndon Connah playing keyboards). This was followed up by his second solo album, One Man, featuring lyrics by Boon Gould. The album was not commercially successful.

King later toured as a solo act, playing both his own new compositions and some Level 42 songs. In 1999, he played some shows at The Jazz Café in London under the name of "The Mark King Group" with a band including Husband, Jakszyk and Lyndon Connah. Jakszyk left the band after the Jazz Café shows, to be replaced on guitar by Nathan King (Mark King's younger brother). King continued to tour with this band, now renamed "Grupo Mark King", over the next couple of years, augmenting the line-up with saxophone player Sean Freeman.

In August 1999, three-quarters of the original Level 42 line-up reunited for a private show. Phil Gould invited some musician friends to play at a party, including his brother Boon and Mike Lindup. In 2001, Mark King, Mike Lindup and Phil Gould played together at Lindup's wedding for the first time in ten years.

=== 2001–2006: Return of Level 42 (seventh lineup) ===
Although Mark King released two solo albums, his previous band's music proved to be persistently popular and he found that he was playing more and more old Level 42 tracks at live shows.

In late 2001, King came to a business agreement with Mike Lindup and bought the rights to the name Level 42. Although Lindup agreed to play on future albums, he did not want to tour. King announced the return of Level 42 with a new line-up which also happened to be the musicians from his current live band: himself, Husband, Connah, Freeman and Nathan King. On 12 July 2002, the first official Level 42 concert for six years was played at The Circus Tavern in Purfleet, Essex. While not recording any new material, for the next few years the band settled into a regular pattern of touring and playing old hits.

On 13 February 2005 there was a brief one-night reunion with Mike Lindup (who joined the band onstage for a date at The Forum in London) and over the course of the year there was a burst of reissue activity. Two Rockpalast shows from 1983 and 1984 were released on DVD, followed by two CD releases: The River Sessions (a live show from 1983 recorded in Scotland) and a new compilation called The Ultimate Collection II. The latter included a new song called "Genius Of Love", which was a Level 42 tribute/collaboration by the Italian-American dance producer Hardage, featuring Mark King on vocals and incorporating a sample of the Level 42 track "I Want Eyes".

=== 2006–2013: Retroglide and further tours and lineup changes ===
In February 2006, after twelve years without releasing a new studio album, Level 42 announced the release of Retroglide. While billed as a band album, it was chiefly recorded and produced by King at his home studio, with Gary Husband, Lyndon Connah, Sean Freeman and Nathan King all contributing.

Retroglide also featured input from two previous Level 42 members. Erstwhile guitarist Boon Gould provided the album's lyrics (as well as contributing a guitar solo on "Ship") and the band was effectively expanded to a six-piece via extensive guest performances by Mike Lindup, who added prominent keyboard parts and vocals to many tracks. Although Phil Gould was uncredited on the album, the track "Ship" is the first song since 1986 worked on by all four original members, as Phil originally arranged the track with his brother Boon. However, Retroglide was also the first Level 42 album not to feature any contributions from Wally Badarou.

In May 2006, Level 42 announced that Mike Lindup would return full-time to replace Lyndon Connah on keyboards.

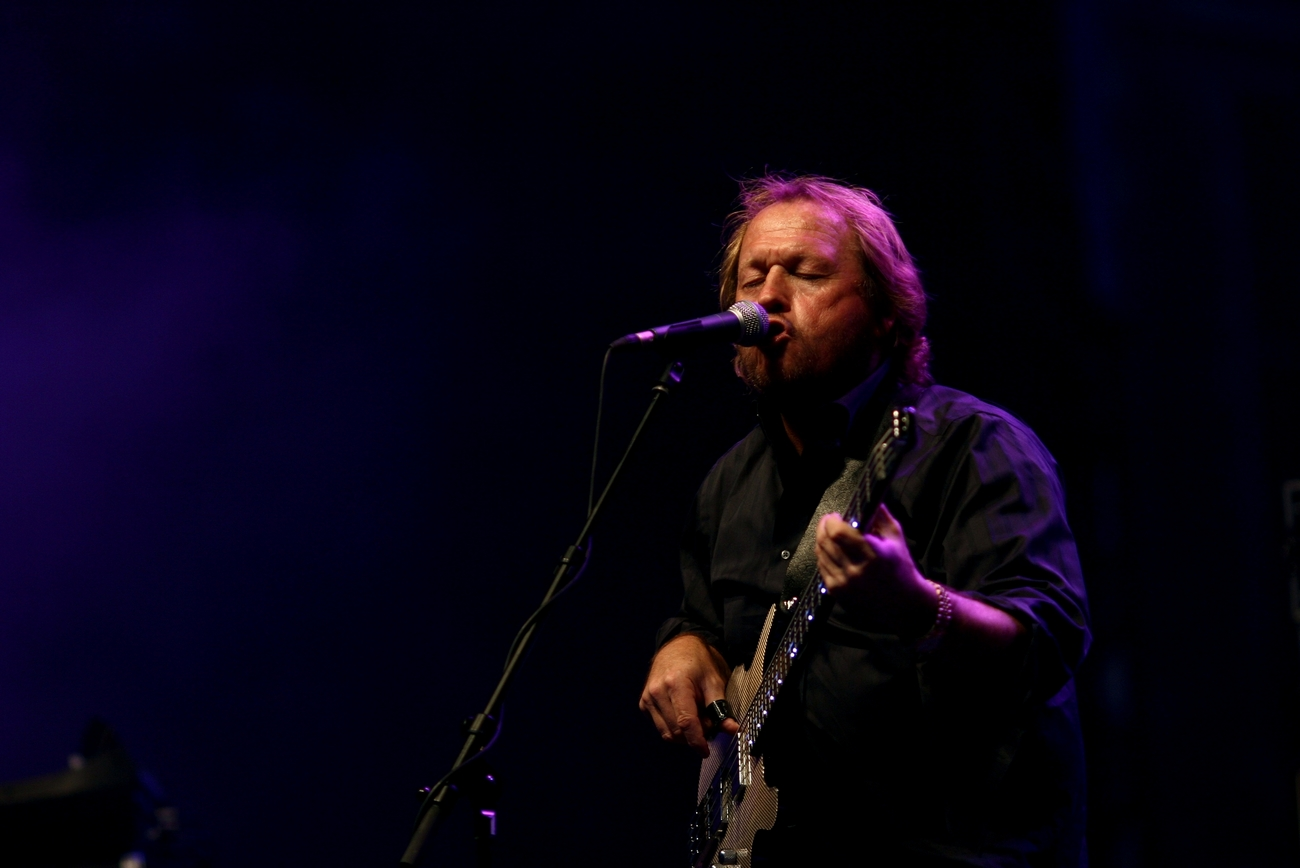
Mark King performing in 2007

Retroglide was promoted via a supporting tour throughout the UK, Netherlands, Germany and several other European countries during October 2006. On 26 August 2007, Level 42 played an outdoor gig at the Arundel Festival in West Sussex: the band's only UK show of the year. In 2008, Level 42 played a twenty-date UK tour.

In 2010, Husband stepped down as Level 42's drummer for the second time, due to prior commitments with John McLaughlin. He was replaced by Pete Ray Biggin.

In 2012, Level 42 toured the UK and mainland Europe, in celebration of the 25th anniversary since the release of Running In The Family, by playing the whole album, with a whole array of other hits. Also included in the shows was an acoustic set, with Mike Lindup playing the accordion. In October 2012, on Mark King's birthday during a gig in Bristol, Boon Gould joined the band on stage.

=== 2013–present: "Sirens" EP series and re-engagement with contemporary dance pop ===
On 20 and 21 September 2013, Level 42 (joined by an expanded brass section), performed three new songs at London's Indigo O2 Arena – "Where's Yo' Head At", "Too Much Time", and "Sirens". All of these appeared on the band's first new release for seven years, the six-song studio EP "Sirens" (released on 31 October 2013, and the first output from the band's new self-owned label Level 42 Records). Mixed by the American DJ John Morales, the EP also contained "Mind On You", "My Independence Day" and "Build Myself a Rocket" (with King's daughter Marlee providing the backing vocals on the last of these tracks). Musically, it built on the production approach of Retroglide while allying the band with contemporary developments in R&B and dance electronica.

On 3 December 2013, the band announced 'The Sirens Tour' – a 30 date tour, starting in October 2014 and taking in the UK, Netherlands, Germany and Italy. In the summer of 2014, the band performed at a number of festivals across Europe including headline performances at Let's Rock Bristol and Rochester Castle.

In 2015, the band appeared at a number of UK and European festivals headlining at 'Let's Rock The Moor' and 'Carfest' concerts. They also played two nights at the Indigo2 in London where the band once again featured a larger brass section consisting of Dan Carpenter (trumpet) and Nicol Thomson (trombone) as well as regular saxophonist Sean Freeman.

In 2016, Level 42 performed at a number of festivals across the UK and Europe as well as in Curaçao, Chile and Argentina before embarking on a UK, Netherlands and Scandinavian tour in order to promote the "Sirens II" EP.

On 1 May 2019, it was announced that Boon Gould had been found dead at his home in Dorset. He was 64.

On 4 July 2019, Level 42 made a rare North American incursion, being the band to perform the first concert to launch the week long Festival d'été de Québec (Quebec City Summer Festival).

== Musical style ==
Musically, the band encompasses jazz-funk, sophisti-pop, smooth jazz, dance-rock, new wave, and synth-pop. The band was predominantly jazz-funk early in its career, and was grouped with British jazz acts such as Atmosfear, Light of the World, Incognito, and Beggar & Co. Later releases were classed as sophisti-pop and dance-rock, akin to the works of Sade and the Style Council. Music database AllMusic stated that the band's style during this time represented "polished, upbeat, danceable pop/rock".

They are also known for frontman Mark King's slap bass guitar playing, as well as the harmonies of King's deep tenor voice and the high tenor/falsetto backing vocals of keyboardist Mike Lindup.

== Awards and nominations ==
| Award | Year | Nominee(s) | Category | Result | Ref. |
|---|---|---|---|---|---|
| BMI London Awards | 2008 | "Something About You" | 3 Million Award | Won | |
| Brit Awards | 1988 | Themselves | British Group | Nominated | |
| Pollstar Concert Industry Awards | 1987 | Molson Canadian Tour (with Steve Winwood) | Most Creative Tour Package | Nominated | |
| Silver Clef Awards | 2023 | Mark King | Icon Award | Won | |

== Members ==
Current members

- Mark King – bass guitar, vocals, percussion, acoustic guitar (1979–1994, 2001–present)
- Mike Lindup – keyboards, synthesizers, piano, vocals (1979–1994, 2001–present; not touring 2001–2006)
- Nathan King – guitar, backing vocals, raps, percussion, acoustic guitar (2001–present)
- Sean "Skip" Freeman – saxophone, backing vocals (2001–present)
- Pete Ray Biggin – drums, timbales, bongos (2010–present)
- Dan Carpenter – trumpet, backing vocals, percussion (2013–present)
- Nichol Thomson – trombone, backing vocals, percussion (2013–present)

== Discography ==
Studio albums

- Level 42 (1981)
- Strategy / The Early Tapes (1982)
- The Pursuit of Accidents (1982)
- Standing in the Light (1983)
- True Colours (1984)
- World Machine (1985)
- Running in the Family (1987)
- Staring at the Sun (1988)
- Guaranteed (1991)
- Forever Now (1994)
- Retroglide (2006)
