= Phil Gould (musician) =

British musician (born 1957)

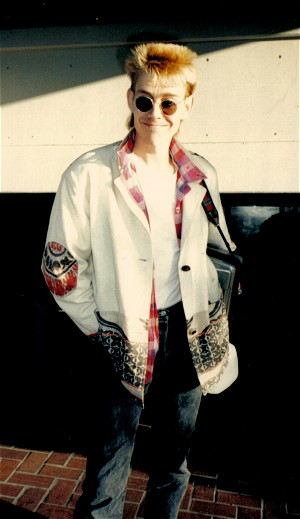
- Gould in San Francisco, California, 1986

Background information
- Born: Philip Gabriel Gould; 28 February 1957 (age 69); British Hong Kong
- Origin: Isle of Wight, England
- Genres: Rock; new wave
- Occupations: Musician; vocalist; songwriter
- Instruments: Drums; piano; vocals
- Years active: 1979–present
- Labels: Polydor; Universal
- Formerly of: Level 42; Re-Flex
- Website: philgouldmusic.com

Philip Gabriel Gould (born 28 February 1957) is a British drummer, songwriter and singer from the Isle of Wight off the south coast of England. He founded the band Level 42 with Mark King.

== Career ==
Gould was born in Hong Kong, and studied percussion at the Royal Academy of Music in London, where he met keyboardist Mike Lindup. Gould's first foray into the charts came with pop group M, drumming on their single "Pop Muzik", a number one single in the United States, and No. 2 hit in the UK. Gould also appeared on Top of the Pops with Roxy Music for their performance of "More Than This" as well as the promo video for the song.

Together with Mike Lindup, Mark King and Gould's guitarist brother Boon, he formed Level 42 and had several major hits, writing many of the lyrics and co-writing several songs. They would achieve their commercial peak with the albums World Machine and Running in the Family, each selling more than a million copies. In 1987, the Gould brothers left Level 42, with Phil citing nervous exhaustion and being unhappy with their new pop sound. Gould has worked as a session musician and record producer for several artists.

Gould briefly returned as a studio drummer and principal lyricist on 1994's Forever Now album. However, dismayed by the record company's incompetence, he did not go on the road with the band for their Forever Now tour, and was quickly replaced as a live drummer by Gavin Harrison.

In 2007, Gould contributed to the debut album Escapizm by Italian singer Diana Winter, co-writing and producing the tracks "Rain" and "Dream Alone", and playing drums. In 2009, Gould released his first solo album Watertight on the Bongo Saloon label. The album features contributions from Mike Lindup, Wally Badarou and Berenice Scott. In January 2009, Gould finally released the album Terraforming under the group name of Gould, Brown and Black. The album was initially made available via iTunes with a view to a CD release later in the year. In November 2013, Gould was busy with The-Bongo-Saloon project.

In 2021, Gould released the album Beautiful Wounds on Abbey Records, which includes contributions from singers Diana Winter, Keira Osment, Anji Hinke and Allison Mareek. It also includes the last recording made by his brother Boon Gould, who contributed a guitar solo to the track "The Russian Submariner".

== Discography ==
- 2009: Watertight
- 2021: Beautiful Wounds

=== With M ===
- 1979: New York • London • Paris • Munich
- 1980: The Official Secrets Act

=== With Level 42 ===
- 1981: Level 42
- 1982: Strategy / The Early Tapes
- 1982: The Pursuit of Accidents
- 1983: Standing in the Light
- 1984: True Colours
- 1985: Physical Presence
- 1985: World Machine
- 1987: Running in the Family
- 1994: Forever Now

=== With Gould, Brown and Black ===
- 2009: Terraforming
