= Mike Lindup =

English keyboard player and falsetto-voiced singer (born 1959)

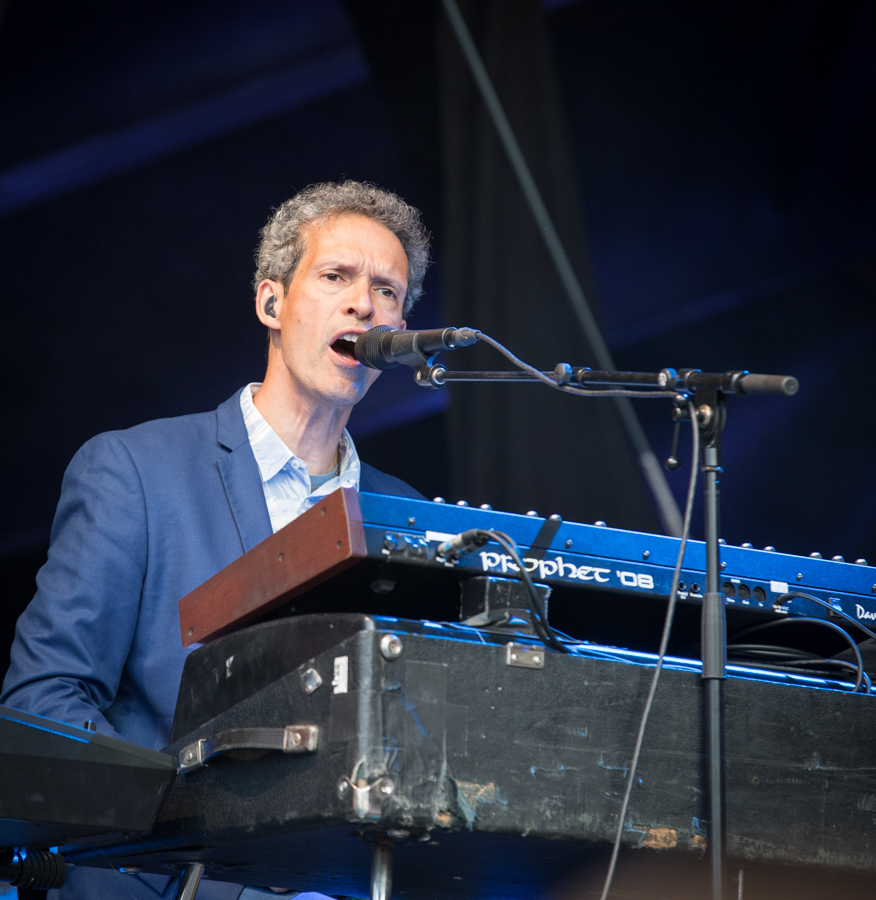
- Lindup performing with Level 42 in 2017

Background information
- Born: Michael David Lindup; 17 March 1959 (age 67)
- Origin: London, England
- Occupations: Musician; songwriter; singer
- Instruments: Keyboards; vocals
- Years active: 1977–present
- Labels: Polydor; Universal
- Member of: Level 42
- Website: mikelindup.com

Michael David Lindup (born 17 March 1959) is an English musician known as the keyboard player and falsetto-voiced singer who joined Mark King and brothers Phil and Boon Gould to form the British jazz-funk/pop rock band Level 42.

== Early life ==
Lindup was born in London, England. He attended Chetham's School of Music in Manchester, where he studied piano, percussion and composition, and sang in senior and chamber choirs, later graduating to the Guildhall School of Music and Drama. There, his musical experience spread to include playing orchestral percussion in concert at the Royal Festival and Albert Halls, drums and keyboards in jazz ensembles and participating in pop workshops.

In 1985, he played in the bateria of the London School of Samba (LSS) in the Notting Hill Carnival. Three founder members of the LSS subsequently played on his first solo LP Changes in 1990.

== Career ==
Since July 2000, Lindup has been part of the live line-up of UK/Brazilian outfit Da Lata, playing keyboards, percussion and providing backing vocals, who have been performing from clubs to festivals in the UK and Europe, U.S., Canada, Japan, South Africa and China.

In 2006, he rejoined Level 42 full-time, replacing Lyndon Connah, ahead of the recording of the album Retroglide.

In 2009, he appeared on Phil Gould's first solo album, Watertight.

In 2012, Lindup dueted with Leee John on a version of "Something About You" at the Leicester Square Theatre, London.

A new solo album by Lindup, Changes 2 – a follow-up to 1990's Changes – was released in 2023. It was described in a Jazzwise review as "funky, soulful, jazzy....Smartly arranged and with finely honed vocal lines from Lindup, it’s thoroughly danceable."

== Personal life ==
Lindup's mother was the Belize-born actress, singer and songwriter Nadia Cattouse (1924–2024) and his father was the English composer, arranger and orchestrator David Lindup (1928–1992).

== Discography ==
- Changes (1990, Resurgence Records)
1. "Changes" (6:32)
2. "Lovely Day" (4:26)
3. "Fallen Angel" (6:14)
4. "The Spirit is Free" (4:48)
5. "Desire" (4:38)
6. "West Coast Man" (4:37)
7. "Judgement Day" (5:44)
8. "Life Will Never Be the Same" (4:41)
9. "Paixao" (5:40)
10. "Jung" (6:56)
- Conversations with Silence (2003, Naim Records)
1. "Sunshine and Showers" (2:43)
2. "Beauty on a Grey Day" (4:16)
3. "Heart of the Matter" (5:54)
4. "Beautiful One" (5:03)
5. "Theme" (1:08)
6. "Variation 1" (0:53)
7. "Variation 2" (1:27)
8. "Variation 3" (2:14)
9. "Finale" (3:13)
10. "El Rincon Cubano" (7:06)
11. "Hero's Return" (6:11)
12. "Waking Up to Love" (7:40)
13. "Walking the Path" (4:04)
14. "Brasil 2000" (5:51)
15. "Last Night Without You" (4:56)
- On the One (EP: 2011)
1. "Madness" (4:59)
2. "Angelo" (5:20)
3. "Love Is the Answer" (4:43)
4. "On the One" (5:51)
5. "Promised Land" (5:02)
6. "Song for Zane" (7:31)
- Changes 2 (2023, Knapdale Records)
1. "Atlantia" (5:52)
2. "Time To Let Go" (5:17)
3. "You Can't Just Live As An Island" (5:09)
4. "Could It Really Be?" feat. Tony Momrelle and Alex Wilson (4:35)
5. "All For Love" (5:44)
6. "World Is Ready" feat. Ursula Rucker (4:48)
7. "Teflon Don" feat John Culshaw (4:38)
8. "David (Goodbye To You)" (5:58)
9. "All As One" (9:44)
10. "Fragile Heart" (5:15)
11. "I Saw You In My Dreams" feat. Omar (6:47)
12. "Courage To Change" (4:51)
