= Wally Badarou =

French musician (born 1955)

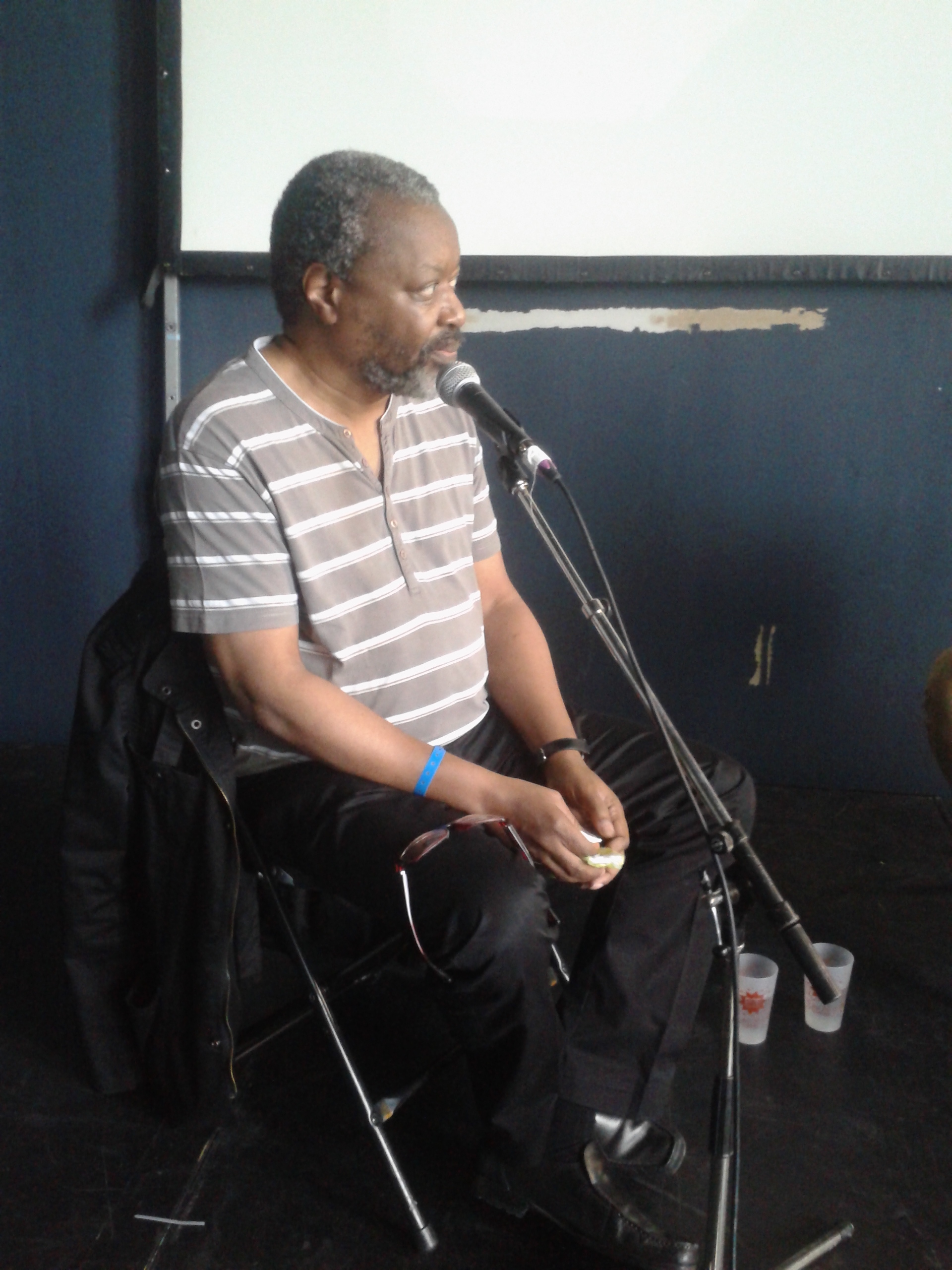
- Badarou in 2016

Background information
- Born: Waliou Jacques Daniel Isheola Badarou; 22 March 1955 (age 71); Paris, France
- Genres: Synth-pop; pop; jazz; jazz fusion; progressive rock; African music; neoclassical; minimalist
- Occupations: Composer; songwriter; musician; record producer
- Instruments: Keyboards; guitar; programming
- Years active: 1978–present
- Labels: Barclay (1978–1982); Island (1982–1995); Blue Mountain Music (1995–2002); Ishe Music (2002–present)
- Website: wallybadarou.com

Waliou Jacques Daniel Isheola "Wally" Badarou (born 22 March 1955) is a French musician. Born in France with ancestry from Benin, West Africa, Badarou is known for his close association with the English group Level 42, and for his prolific work as a session musician with a wide variety of performers from around the world.

== Biography ==
One of Badarou's first recording experiences was when he was invited by bassist Julian Scott to play on his brother Robin's 1979 single "Pop Muzik", which was released under the band name M, which became an international hit. As a session musician, Badarou also played on Miriam Makeba's album Comme une symphonie d'amour, and on Alain Chamfort's Amour, Année Zéro.

Badarou was close to Island Records's founder Chris Blackwell, and was one of the Compass Point All Stars (with Sly and Robbie, Barry Reynolds, Mikey Chung and Uziah "Sticky" Thompson), the in-house recording team of Compass Point Studios responsible for a long series of albums of the 1980s recorded by Grace Jones, Tom Tom Club, Joe Cocker, Mick Jagger, Black Uhuru, Gwen Guthrie, Jimmy Cliff and Gregory Isaacs.

Badarou was the long-time associate of the English jazz-funk band Level 42, contributing on keyboards, synthesizers and programming. He has co-written and performed on a number of the band's tracks since their recording début in 1980, later co-producing them. Though never an official member of Level 42, he could be considered a de facto fifth member of the band's classic line-up from 1980 through 1994, as he played keyboards and synths on all their studio albums, and co-wrote and/or co-produced much of their material. However, Badarou did not play with Level 42 on concert dates, and he has not been involved with the revived version of the group, which reunited in the early 2000s.

Badarou's keyboard playing can also be heard on albums by Robert Palmer, Marianne Faithfull, Herbie Hancock, Talking Heads, Tom Tom Club, Foreigner, Power Station, Melissa Etheridge, Manu Dibango, Miriam Makeba, and Lizzy Mercier Descloux.

He produced albums by Fela Kuti, Salif Keita, Wasis Diop, Trilok Gurtu, Carlinhos Brown; wrote for the films Countryman and Kiss of the Spider Woman; plus directed and wrote for Jean-Paul Goude's French Bicentennial parade, Bastille Day 1989. He worked on Lizzy Mercier Descloux's second studio album, Mambo Nassau, acting as an uncredited co-producer and unacknowledged co-songwriter.

His solo instrumental work includes two albums: Echoes (1984) and Words of a Mountain (1989). The former included "Chief Inspector", "Mambo" (sampled for Massive Attack's "Daydreaming" (Blue Lines album)), and "Hi-Life". "Chief Inspector" peaked at No. 46 in the UK singles chart in October 1985.

The Words of a Mountain album is believed to be one of the first fully tapeless recordings in contemporary/new-age history: co-pioneering the

home studio concept with other electronic musicians of his generation, Badarou established a reputation on the field with his extensive use of Sequential Circuits Prophet 5, New England Digital Synclavier, and custom voice-controlled Yamaha digital mixers.

Badarou also helped organise the Kora All Africa Music Awards in 1997, while co-writing and producing So Why, a charity album for the ICRC, conceived as a call against ethnic cleansing in Africa, featuring Youssou N'Dour and Papa Wemba.

He has embraced stage acting since the early 2000s, showing interest in aviation, movies, science-fiction and philosophy.

By the end of 2009, starting with Fisherman, a 15-minute long "marathon in afro-beat territory", Badarou releases his albums—including his latest, The Unnamed Trilogy—exclusively online, one single at a time via the JukeSticker, a direct and sharable transaction tool: "At very long last, my fans are to receive the music that never stopped haunting me all these years. The whole of it will be available as a physical collector set, once the three albums are fully revealed".

In 2012, he was elected to the board of SACEM, the French collective management organisation for authors rights in music.

In 2014, along with a cast of music luminaries, he founded the African Music Academy (AMA).

== Discography ==
=== Solo ===
- 1979: Back to Scales Tonight
- 1984: Echoes
- 1985: Chief Inspector (EP)
- 1989: Words of a Mountain
- 1997: So Why
- 2001: Colors of Silence : Musical poetry for Yoga
- 2009: The Unnamed Trilogy

=== Movie scores ===
- 1981: Dickie Jobson: Countryman
- 1982: Nathalie Delon & Yves Deschamps: They Call It an Accident
- 1985: Hector Babenco: Kiss of the SpiderWoman (additional music)
- 1991: Lol Creme: The Lunatic
- 1997: Idrissa Ouedraogo: Kini & Adams
- 1997: Don Letts & Rick Elgood: DanceHall Queen
- 1999: Chris Browne: Third World Cop
- 2000: John Berry: Boesman & Lena
- 2024: Mati Diop: Dahomey

=== Producer (and co-producer) ===
- 1979: Janic Prévost – J'veux d'la Tendresse
- 1981: Alain Chamfort – Amour Année Zéro
- 1983: Marianne Faithfull – A Child's Adventure (and co-writer)
- 1985: Level 42 – World Machine (and co-writer)
- 1986: Alain Chamfort – Tendres Fièvres (and co-writer)
- 1986: Fela Anikulapo Kuti – Teacher Don't Teach Me Nonsense
- 1987: Level 42 – Running in the Family (and co-writer)
- 1988: Level 42 – Staring at the Sun (and co-writer)
- 1990: Level 42 – Guaranteed (and co-writer)
- 1993: Level 42 – Forever Now (and co-writer)
- 1995: Salif Keita – Folon
- 1996: Carlinhos Brown – AlfaGamaBetizado
- 1998: Yannick Noah & Zam Zam – Zam Zam
- 1998: Wasis Diop – Toxu
- 2000: Trilok Gurtu -The Beat of Love (and co-writer)
- 2001: i Muvrini – Umani

=== Session player ===
- 1977: Fireball - Drive Me To Hell
- 1979: M – New-York, London, Paris, Munich ("Pop Muzik")
- 1979: Miriam Makeba – Comme une symphonie d'amour
- 1980: Bernie Lyon – Bernie Lyon
- 1980: Grace Jones – Warm Leatherette
- 1980: M – The Official Secrets Act
- 1981: Lizzy Mercier Descloux – Mambo Nassau
- 1981: Grace Jones – Nightclubbing
- 1981: Level 42 – Level 42 (and co-writer)
- 1981: Bernie Lyon – I'm Living in the Sunshine
- 1981: Gibson Brothers – Quartier Latin
- 1981: Barry Reynolds – I Scare Myself
- 1981: Will Tura – Tura 81
- 1981: Jimmy Cliff – Give The People What They Want
- 1982: Level 42 – The Early Tapes (and co-writer)
- 1982: Charlélie Couture – Pochette Surprise
- 1982: Joe Cocker – Sheffield Steel
- 1982: Black Uhuru – Chill Out
- 1982: Gregory Isaacs – Night Nurse
- 1982: Grace Jones – Living My Life
- 1982: Gwen Guthrie – Gwen Guthrie
- 1982: Robin Scott & Shikisha – Jive Shikisha !
- 1982: Level 42 – The Pursuit of Accidents (and co-writer)
- 1983: Level 42 – Standing in the Light (and co-writer)
- 1983: Talking Heads – Speaking in Tongues
- 1983: Tom-Tom Club – Close to the Bone
- 1984: Level 42 – True Colours (and co-writer)
- 1984: Foreigner – Agent Provocateur
- 1985: Mick Jagger – She's The Boss
- 1985: Power Station – Some Like It Hot
- 1985: Level 42 – World Machine (and co-writer)
- 1985: Gwen Guthrie – Just For You
- 1985: Sly & Robbie – Language Barrier
- 1985: Robert Palmer – Riptide
- 1987: Level 42 – Running in the Family (and co-writer)
- 1988: Manu Dibango – Electric Africa
- 1988: Melissa Etheridge – Melissa Etheridge
- 1988: Talking Heads – Naked
- 1988: Julio Iglesias – Libra
- 1994: Power Station – Living in Fear
- 2008: Grace Jones – Hurricane
- 2009: Phil Gould – Watertight
- 2021: Phil Gould – Beautiful Wounds

== Bibliography ==
- Melissa Chemam, "Massive Attack: Out of the Comfort Zone", Tangent Books, ISBN 978-1910089729 (2019).
