= Mark King (musician) =

British bassist and singer (born 1958)

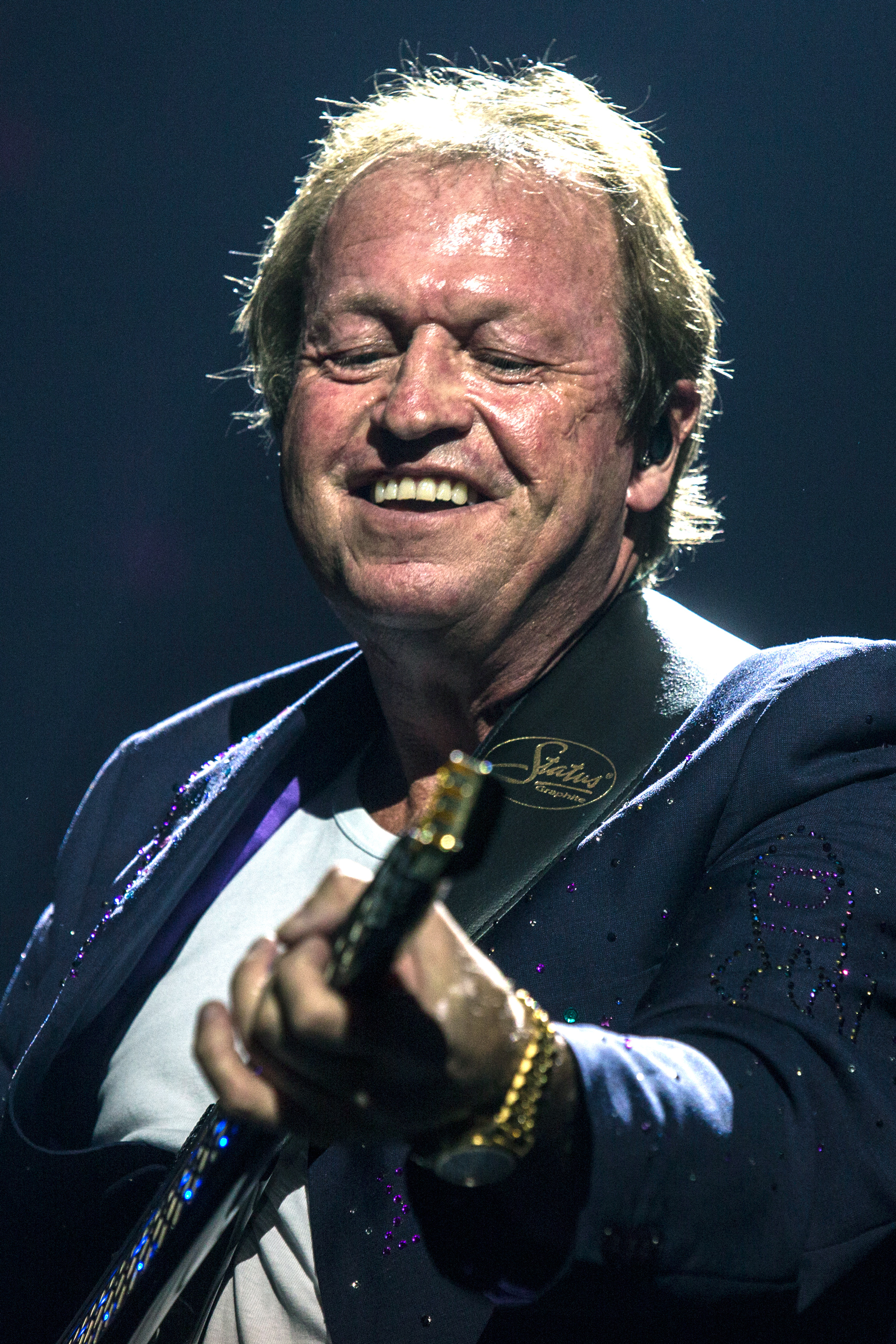
- King in 2013

Background information
- Born: Mark Raymond King; 20 October 1958 (age 68); Cowes, Isle of Wight, England
- Genres: Jazz-funk; sophisti-pop; dance-rock; new wave; synth-pop
- Occupations: Singer; songwriter; musician
- Instruments: Vocals; bass guitar; drums; percussion
- Years active: 1977–present
- Labels: Polydor; Virgin; DFP Music; W14; Summerhouse
- Member of: Level 42; Gizmodrome
- Formerly of: Re-Flex

Mark Raymond King (born 20 October 1958) is an English singer, songwriter, and musician. He is the lead vocalist and bassist of the jazz-funk band Level 42. King is known for his slap style of playing the bass guitar, with MusicRadar describing him as "the guy who put the slap in pop during the 80s". King received a BASCA Gold Badge Award in October 2015 in recognition of his contribution to British music. He won the "Outer Limits" award at the 2017 Progressive Music Awards.

== Early life ==
King was born and brought up in Cowes, Isle of Wight, off the south coast of mainland England. His father, Raymond King, was a dairyman, and the family lived in a tied dairy house. King recalled in a 2006 newspaper interview, "it was post-war, with one brass tap, an outside toilet and a zinc bath in front of the fire". He later lived on the Camp Hill and Albany prison estates on the outskirts of Newport. He attended Kitbridge Middle School where he met his childhood sweetheart Tracey Wilson, later writing a song about her. He then went to Cowes High School.

Originally, King began his musical career as a drummer (starting aged nine after his father bought him his first kit for £10) and learning guitar aged 11. In 1974, when he was fifteen, King met his future Level 42 bandmate Phil Gould, who remembers the young King "came and sat in with the band that I formed, at one of the gigs we were doing. He brought his kit down and blew me off, blew me off the stage because he was so much faster than me". Gould also remembers the young King as being a budding multi-instrumentalist, a "really good guitarist" who would "play around with programming, synth stuff. He was one of those natural musicians."

King received encouragement to pursue a career in music from his music teacher at middle school, but was asked to leave Cowes High School at the age of 17 when he came to school wearing denim jeans. King recalls in a magazine interview: "It didn't go down very well, and I was told my schooling had run its course." King then left home and stayed at a friend's house for two weeks, sleeping on the floor, before getting a job on a production line at a Ronson lighter factory. After quitting this job, King became a milkman, but he was still determined to "prove [he] was not a failure". So, aged 19, King moved to London, along with his milk van, in hope of finding a career in music. He played drums for the new wave band Re-Flex in their early years, before starting his career as a bassist.

== Career ==
=== Level 42 ===
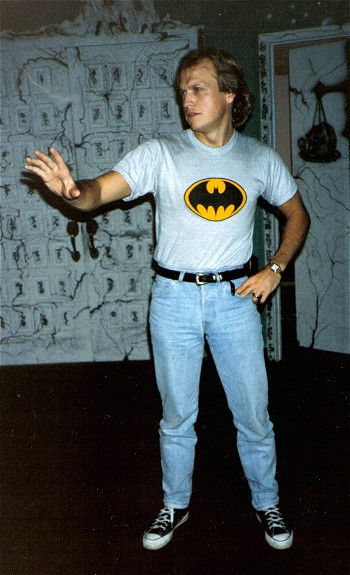
King in Santa Clara, California, 1987

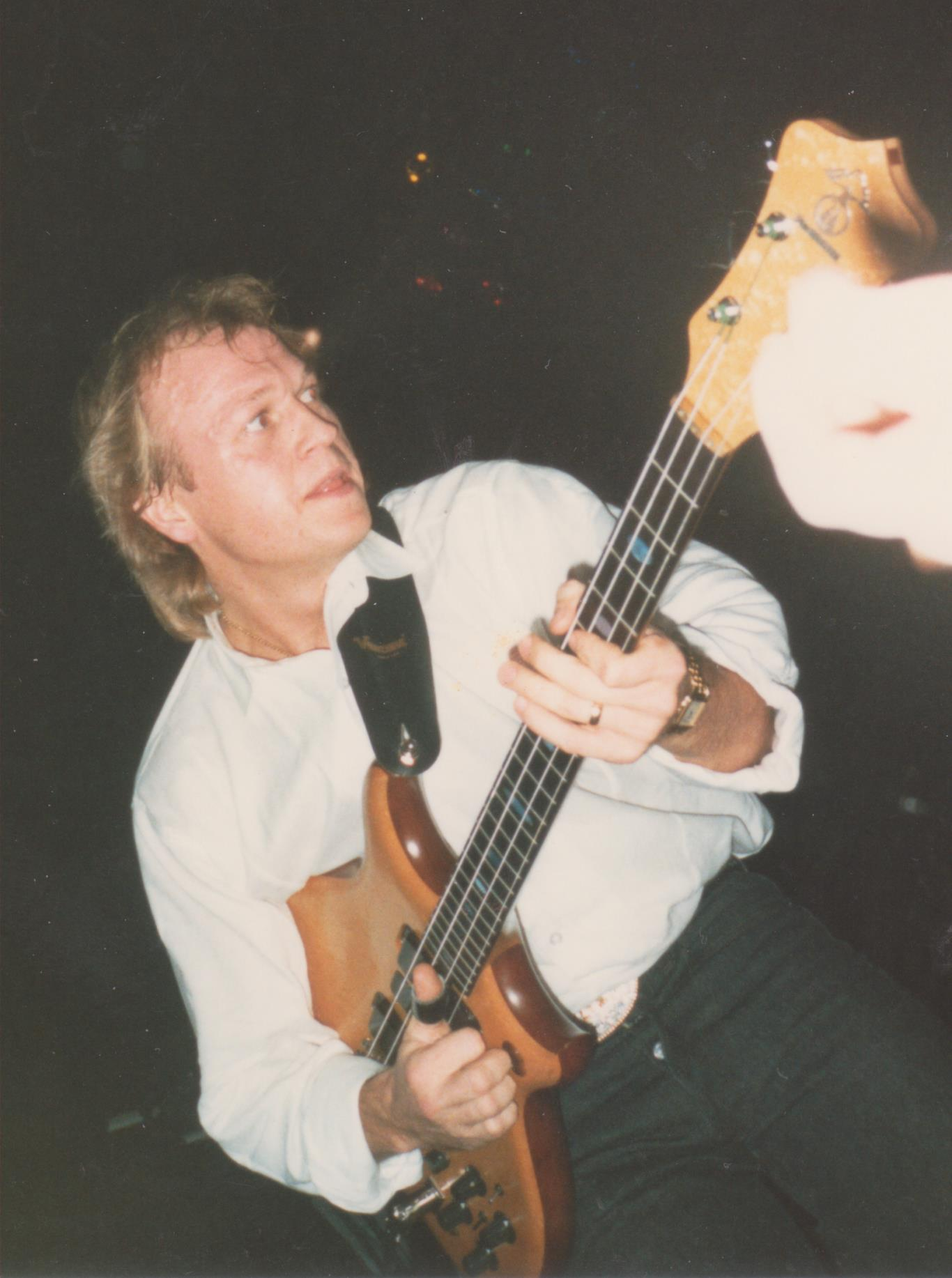
King performing in Tel Aviv, Israel, 1988

King moved to London at the age of 19, subsequently forming Level 42 in 1979 with Phil Gould, keyboardist Mike Lindup and Phil's guitarist brother Boon. Although a drummer, King found himself having to learn bass guitar after landing a job at Macari's, a musical instrument store. In an interview with the magazine Music U.K. (May 1984 issue), he states:

I kept up playing drums until I moved to London. I'd always wanted to be a good drummer and it's just ironic that I've turned out to be a bass player. The way I started playing bass was that when I arrived in London I was looking for a job, and the only place I could find one was in Macaris in Charing Cross Rd. I wanted to get something involved in music, and that seemed like a good place to be. But Macaris didn't sell drums, and so I lied and said I could play bass. They said, "Fine, you sell the basses, and sweep up and get the coffees and whatever".

Nevertheless, King's natural rhythmic intuition probably contributed to his distinctive bass-playing style, along with the popularity of jazz-funk in Britain at the time.

At one of their first gigs, at the La Babalu club in Ryde, Level 42 were spotted by Andy Sojka, the head of small independent record label Elite and signed them. The next year, they were signed to Polydor Records and King spent the next nine years recording and touring with the band. The first Top 40 single, "Love Games", was released in 1981, heralding the band's first appearance on Top of the Pops (TOTP). The big breakthrough came with the release of "The Sun Goes Down (Living It Up)" in 1983.

While in Level 42, King found his bass-playing services in some demand. He was invited by Nik Kershaw to play on his second studio album The Riddle (1984) and by Midge Ure to play on his first two studio albums The Gift (1985) and Answers to Nothing (1988), as well as the only 80s studio albums by M, The Official Secrets Act (1980) and Famous Last Words (1982). He also performed on David Bowie's song "Tumble and Twirl", from his sixteenth studio album Tonight (1984).

Level 42 supported the Police in 1981, followed by tours with Steve Winwood and Queen in 1986 and Madonna in 1987.

Level 42 released their eleventh studio album Retroglide in 2006 and a European tour followed.

Level 42 (line up: Mark King, Mike Lindup, Gary Husband, Nathan King, Sean Freeman) toured in autumn of 2008.

=== Solo work ===
In 1984, King released his debut solo studio album Influences, which was followed by One Man in 1998.

In 1999, he issued a collection of unused songs in the form of the album Trash; the name hinted at the rough, unpolished nature of the recordings (which were rejected by Virgin Records in favour of the tracks which would ultimately appear on the One Man studio album).

Trash was a historic release as it was issued without a record label and initially offered to fans via a low-key guestbook entry, made by King, on www.level42.com. Using an Apple Mac, CD burner and inkjet printer, King manufactured the CD himself and posted it directly to fans, charging £17 plus postage. He hand signed and numbered early copies. Clearly not anticipating the popularity of the album, the initial CDs were numbered as part of a series of 100. King eventually sold over 1,000 copies.

In the years following Trash, King repeated the successful 'home-made' formula releasing a string of live recordings including Live at the Jazz Cafe, Live on the Isle of Wight and Live at Reading Concert Hall (which despite being performed as a Mark King solo show, was released under the name of Level 42 as King retained the rights to the name shortly before releasing the CD). Despite being contracted to Universal Music Group imprint W14, King continues to release live shows on his own Summerhouse record label, of which 2007's Retroglide Live DVD was the first.

Since coming back into the limelight in 1998 with One Man and the supporting UK tour, King has toured consistently around Europe and as far east as Indonesia. With the exception of Trash, he has only issued one new professionally released studio album in the eight-year period, September 2006's Retroglide under the Level 42 banner.

In 2016, King formed the British-Italian-American rock supergroup Gizmodrome, alongside Stewart Copeland, Adrian Belew and Vittorio Cosma. The band released their eponymous debut studio album in September 2017.

In 2019, King played and sang on Taylor Hawkins and the Coattail Riders song "Queen of the Clowns" from their third and final studio album Get the Money.

== Playing style ==
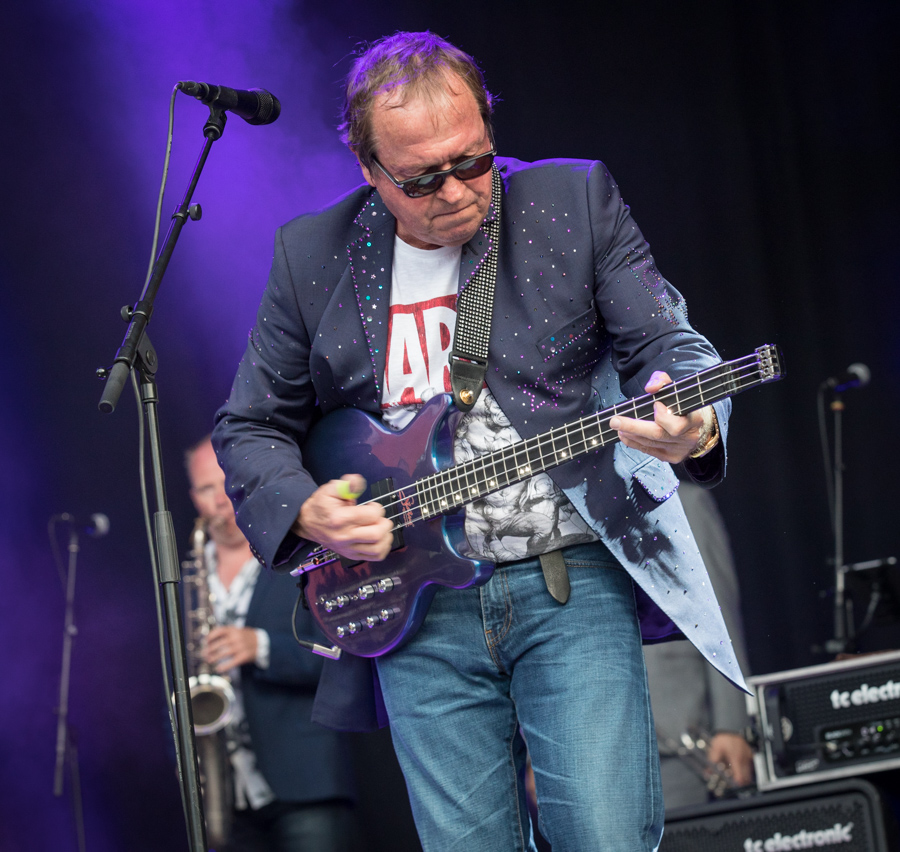
King in 2017, playing bass guitar with a slapping technique

King helped to develop and popularize the slap and pop style of playing the bass guitar in the 1980s. The slapping and popping style was developed in the 1970s by funk bassists such as Larry Graham and further developed by jazz fusion bassists such as Stanley Clarke and Marcus Miller. King developed a rapid playing speed using this technique, and introduced technical elements that enabled him to produce a mix of percussive effects while still playing a bassline.

One of King's greatest influences was the musician Tom Taylor, who gave King guitar lessons when King was 12.

King's bass-playing style is largely based on continuous sixteenth notes (aka semiquavers), sometimes described as "machine-gun" style. This "machine-gun" style consists of playing rapidly using a combination of thumb slaps, pops, hammer-ons, and fretting hand slaps.

King also took part in a comedy skit titled "The Easy Guitar Book Sketch" with comedian Rowland Rivron and fellow British musicians Mark Knopfler of Dire Straits, Lemmy of Motörhead, David Gilmour of Pink Floyd, and Gary Moore.

== Instruments ==
King has used various models of bass guitar through the years; the two most commonly used brands have been Jaydee and Status Graphite. The Jaydees were built by John Diggins, a former employee of John Birch; Jaydee is phonetic for his initials, J.D. King also used a Pangborn Warlord bass, perhaps two, hand-built by luthier Ashley Pangborn, in the early 1980s.

King has used Status Graphite basses since the 1980s including the Series-2000 and Empathy models. In November 2000, Rob Green and King developed the Status KingBass, a headless, double cut-away bass with a woven graphite through-neck, Status Hyperactive pickups and active electronics.

Other known basses he has used are Alembics (specifically custom Series II models), of which there is a Signature Mark King model, Pangborn basses, a Zon Guitars bass. King's first fretless bass was a Japanese-made "Moon" Jazz-style bass. King also owned two Music Man StingRay basses, a Wal bass, which was fitted with an MB4 MIDI interface.

In 1996, King briefly used Fender Jazz Basses. A limited run of 42 "Mark King" Jazz Basses were made, based on the American Deluxe series, built and set up to King's specifications.

King endorses Rotosound strings and uses their Funkmaster set (.30-.50-.70-.90) on his instruments.

== Personal life ==
Just before his divorce from his wife Pia, King moved back to his native Isle of Wight in 1988. During the 1990s, King purchased a pub in Ryde. King sold the pub in 2000. King lives with his current wife Ria and youngest daughter.

He is the elder brother of fellow Level 42 and Frost* member Nathan King.

=== Activism ===
King is a longstanding supporter of the King's Trust (formerly the Prince's Trust). On 20 June 1986, King and Lindup performed alongside stars such as Eric Clapton, Rod Stewart, Phil Collins, Mark Knopfler, Midge Ure and Elton John, at the Prince's Trust All-Star Rock Concert at Wembley Arena to celebrate the first 10 years of the Trust; a recording was subsequently released on video. He was also a performer at the Prince's Trust Rock Gala at the Royal Albert Hall in November 2010 and 2011.

King serves as a tourism 'ambassador' for his native Isle of Wight.

== Discography ==
=== Albums ===
- Influences (1984/Polydor)
- One Man (1998/Virgin)
- Trash (1999/DFP Music)
- Live at the Jazz Cafe (1999/DFP Music) (live)
- Live on the Isle of Wight (2000/DFP Music) (live)
- Live in Soho (2012) (live)

=== Singles ===
- "Freedom" (1982) as Thunderthumbs & the Toetsenman (Mark King and Mike Lindup)
- "I Feel Free" (1984)
- "Bitter Moon" (1998)

=== DVDs ===
- Mark King – Ohne Filter (1996) (live)
- Grupo Mark King – Live on the Isle of Wight (2000/DFP Music) (live)
