= Back to the Mono Kero =

Studio album by eX-Girl
- Released: May 29, 2001
- Recorded: August/October 2000
- Length: 55:13 (US release)
- Label: HIBOOM
- Producer: Hoppy Kamiyama

EX-Girl chronology
Big When Far, Small When Close (2000)	Back to the Mono Kero (2001)	Endangered Species (2004)

Professional ratings
Review scores
Source	Rating
AllMusic	4.5/5 stars
The Boston Phoenix	3/4 stars
Pitchfork	6.8/10

Back to the Mono Kero is the fourth studio album by the Japanese girl band eX-Girl, released by HIBOOM in Japan, Ipecac Recording in the US (IPC-15), 62 TV Records in Belgium, Valve Records in Australia, and Levy-yhtiö in Finland.

The line-up consisted of Chihiro, Kirilo and Fuzuki, and the album was produced by Hoppy Kamiyama.

== Track listing ==
1. "Waving Scientist @ Frog King" (Lyrics: eX-Girl / Music: Hoppy Kamiyama, eX-Girl) – 3:58.
2. "Tozka" (Lyrics: Chihiro / Music: Kamiyama, eX-Girl) – 5:05.
3. "Aji Fry (Fried Horse Mackerel)" (Lyrics: eX-Girl, Kamiyama / Music: Kamiyama, eX-Girl) – 4:11.
4. "Pop Muzik" (Lyrics & Music: Robin Scott) – 4:51.
5. "Gween-Kong-Zee" (Lyrics: Kirilo / Music: Kamiyama, eX-Girl) – 4:57.
6. "Cucumber Surrender" (Lyrics: Kirilo / Music: Kamiyama, eX-Girl) – 5:47.
7. "Wipe Out #3" (Music: Kamiyama) – 2:12.
8. "Solid States Kerok'n'Roll" (Lyrics: eX-Girl / Music: Kamiyama, eX-Girl) – 4:22.
9. "Zero Gravity" (Lyrics: Fuzuki / Music: Kamiyama, eX-Girl) – 4:35.
10. "Crime of the Century" (Music: Kamiyama, eX-Girl) – 9:46.
11. "Sasuke" (Lyrics: Kirilo, Kamiyama / Music: Kamiyama, eX-Girl) – 5:25.

=== Bonus tracks ===
- "Let My Name Be Swallow" – track 12 (Japanese release).
- "Swanky*Spunky*Slinky" – track 12 (Belgian release).

== Personnel ==
- Chihiro – vocals, guitar, sitar.
- Kirilo – vocals, bass, Casiotone.
- Fuzuki – vocals, drums, percussion.
- Steve Eto – tom-tom (M-6).
- Hoppy Kamiyama – Digital President, asshole box, scum tape from garbage, Slide Geisha, metal, gram pot.

== Production ==
- Hoppy Kamiyama – producer.
- Yoshiaki Kondo – engineering, mixing at GOK Sound Studio, Tokyo, August/October 2000.
- Masayo Takise – mastering at M's Disc, Tokyo.
- Patricia de Ruijter, Saguaro – photos.
- Kazunori Akita, Robeert Farrell – eX-Girl logos.
- Naomi Hamada, Yukari Terakawa, Reiko – costumes.
- Tomoko Kobayasi – hairdresser.
