= EX-Girl =

Japanese female noise rock band

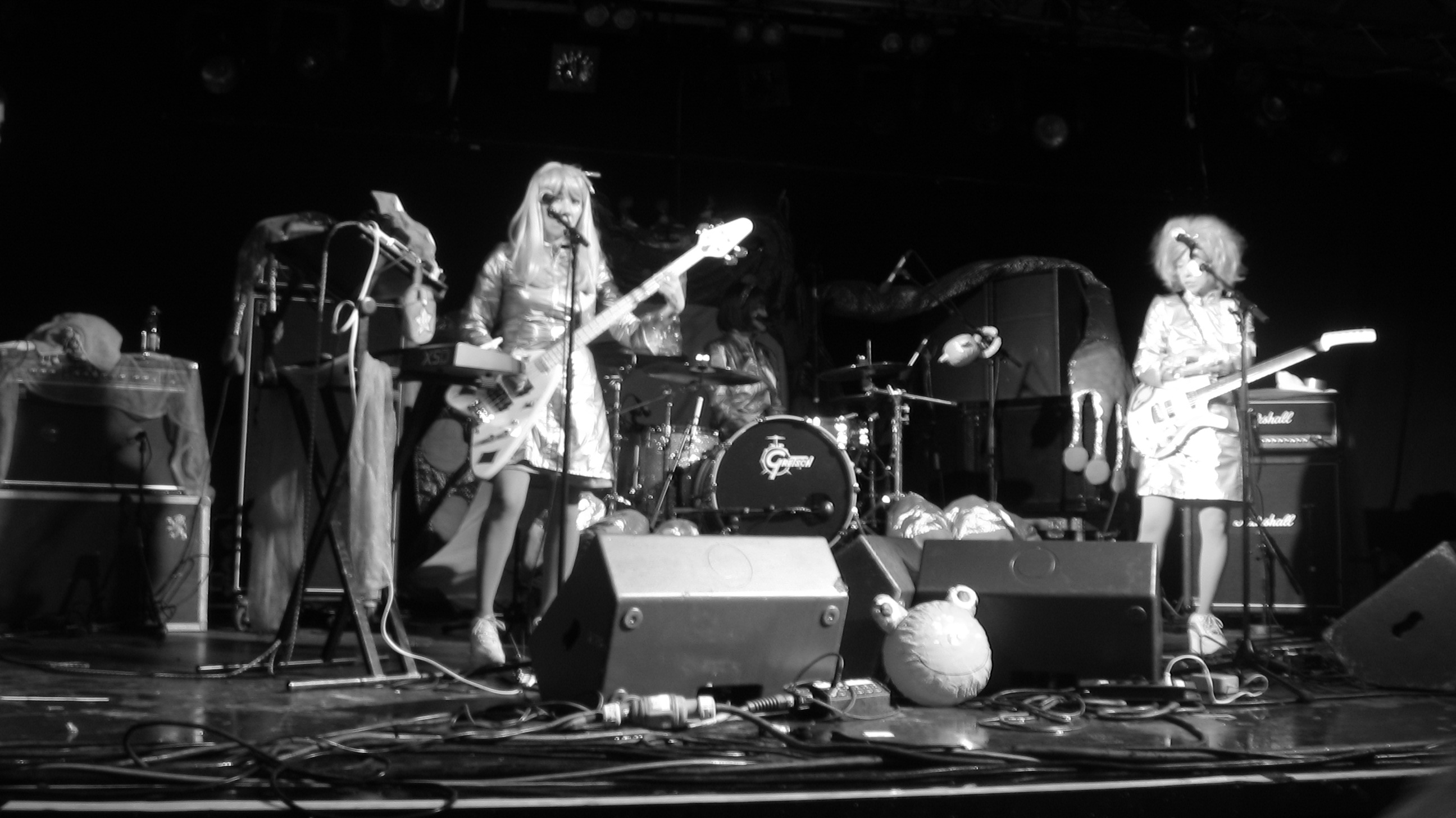
- eX-Girl performing at Storåsfestivalen in 2007.

Background information
- Origin: Tokyo, Japan
- Genres: Art punk, noise rock, experimental rock experimental, avant-garde, space rock, neo-psychedelia, indie rock, art pop, avant-prog, electronic, synth-pop
- Years active: 1997–2007; 2018–present
- Labels: Paranoiz, Kiki Poo, HiBoom, 62 TV, Guided Missile, Ipecac, Alternative Tentacles
- Members: Kirilola; Hiromi; Yuka
- Past members: Fuzuki; Chihiro; Keikos; Zorek; Yoko; Makiyo
- Website: exgirl.lolitapunk.jp

Ex-Girl (stylized as eX-Girl) is a Japanese noise rock band. The band's lineup currently consists of Kirilola (bass, vocals), Hiromi (drums, vocals) and Yuka (guitar, vocals).

== Overview ==
Ex-Girl claims to hail from the planet Kero Kero. They are described as psychedelic, space rock, jazz fusion, jagged alternating vocal harmonies, sugary synthesiser pop, punk, prog, epic/atmospheric, noise-rock, wavering three-part a cappella, borderline operatic vocals, often in the space of a single song. Live performances include home-made costumes, synchronised robot dancing and frog-related items. Enthusiastic supporters include Mike Patton and Jello Biafra:

Ex-Girl are a beautiful example of information overload. Jagged 3 part vocal harmonies, adventurous arrangements, and songs that hook you like the sucker that you are. Take all of these treats, wrap it in an ultra-bright technicolor live show with surreal homemade costumes, and you've got the sensation of being strapped in on an out-of-control carnival ride that will leave you standing in line waiting for another turn.

— Mike Patton

== History ==
Ex-Girl was founded in 1997. Its original members were Chihiro, Kirilo and Fuzuki. Regardless of the members' nonexistent musical experience, their career took off quickly as they began touring and released their debut album within a year of creating the band, all safely under the wing of the famous producer/keyboardist Hoppy Kamiyama.

In 1999, the band performed at the Japan Nite event at SXSW in Austin, Texas. Around this time Virgin Megastore and Tower Records noticed Ex-Girl and did their part in marketing the new album Kero! Kero! Kero!.

The a cappella album Big When Far, Small When Close was released in 2000 via Kirilo's own label Kikipoo Records. At the same time, Ex-Girl released their previous album in Europe, which brought the band to tour the continent for the first time. In July, they toured together with Fantômas, with the help of Mike Patton (Faith No More). The band performed in Finland from October to November.

The group returned to Europe again in 2001, playing at big events such as Denmark's Roskilde Festival. At the end of the year, they had their first ever change of line-up as Chihiro quit and Keiko (of Super Junky Monkey) picked up the spot of being Ex-Girl's guitarist. Before the change, though, the original members had a project named PUNK LADY, where they covered Pink Lady's biggest hits. Ex-Girl, with the new line-up, toured again in Finland in 2002, before having the chance to support Siouxsie and the Banshees on its tours both in the US and the UK. This increased their popularity.

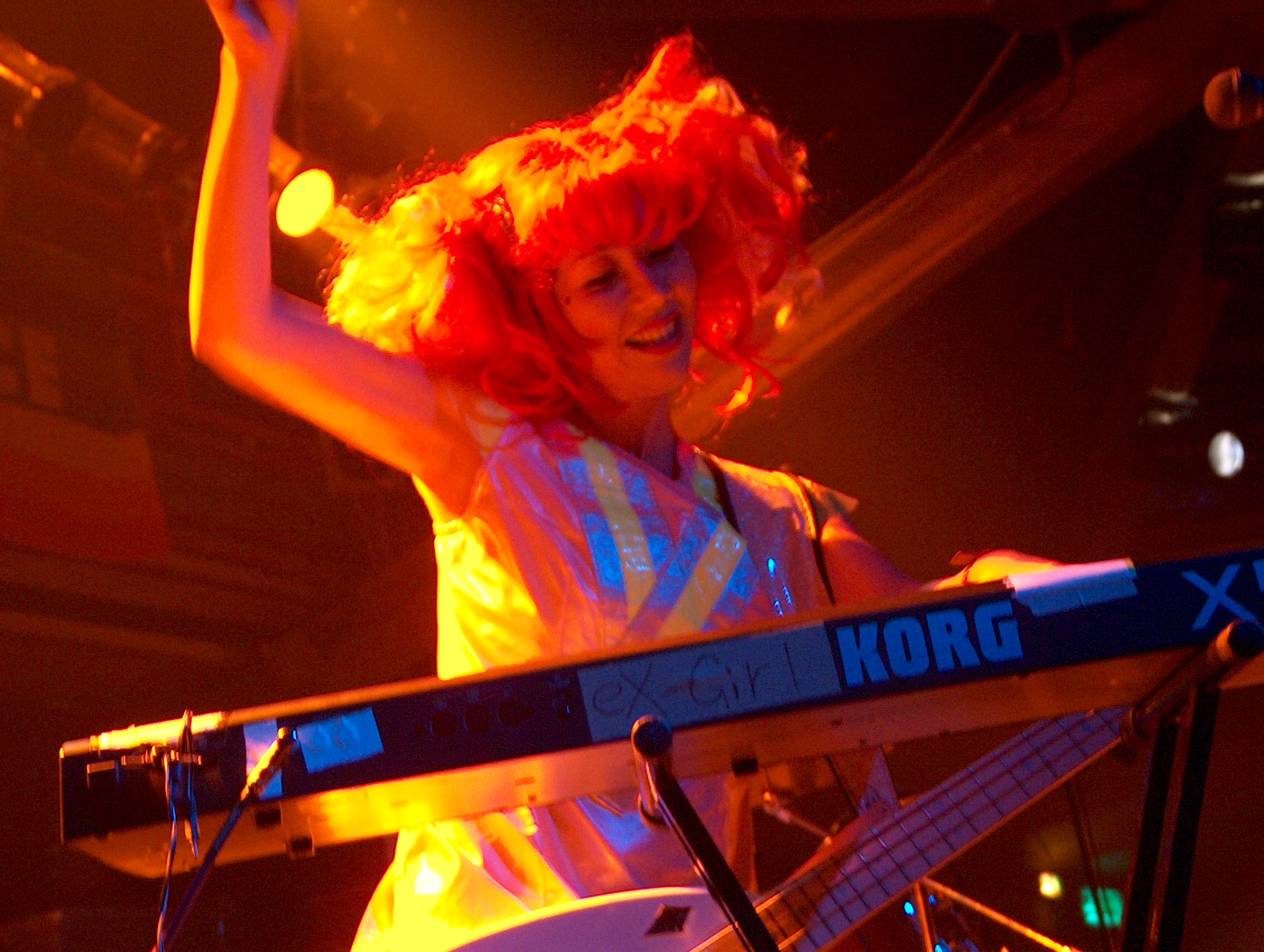
Kirilola performing with eX-Girl in Italy in 2004

The line-up continued to change. Drummer Fuzuki left Ex-Girl in 2003, replaced by Chapple. Kirilo changed her name to Kirilola and Keiko changed hers to Keikos. The American-based label Alternative Tentacles released the next album, Endangered Species, during which the band used another guitarist, named Zorek, though only on tour. The album was completed by Keiko's guitar. When Keiko returned, the drummer changed once again. Despite the changes, the band continued touring in the United States, but time brought more changes. By the beginning of the year 2006, Kirilola had changed her position from bass to guitar, and the new member Laan Zukioh was the new bassist. Later in the summer, Bonb-Chu was found to fulfill his position as drummer. With this line-up the group started their new world tour in October 2006.

By the summer of 2007, the band flew to Northern Europe and held seven performances over the span of two months. Shortly after this final tour, the band announced they would be taking an indefinite hiatus. The band went dormant in 2007. In 2018, Kirilola announced on their web site that she had re-formed the band after returning from climbing Mt. Hakusan to discover a U.S. record label, Secret Records, wanted to reprint Kero Kero Kero on vinyl. Inspired by this, Kirilola searched for two new members and announced their first reunion show in 11 years at Kichijoji GB in Kichijoji, Tokyo on October 18, 2018.

The band's only remaining original member, Kirilola, has several ongoing music-related projects. The artist has taken part in Kamiyama's artistic projects with her singing, playing and dancing, and in 2004, she released spiritual healing music under the project name Akasau. This album was recorded together with several musicians, the main one being Renge, who plays traditional Japanese bells. In 2009, Kirilola presented her solo "Nuriemaki" performances, with costumes based on kimono and folk outfits and accompanied by traditional Japanese instruments.

In March 2019, Ex-Girl performed at SXSW in Austin, Texas.

== Band members ==
=== Current lineup ===
- Kirilo/Kirilola - Bassist, synth player, vocalist and co-writer of all material with band manager/producer Hoppy Kamiyama. The only remaining original member left, she tends to be the leading figure of the group and comes up with most of their costume designs.
- Keikos - Guitarist and vocalist. Her entrance into the band brought a meatier guitar and more aggressive guitar sound, most likely due to her time in Super Junky Monkey. Replaced Chihiro, departed, returned to the fold again.
- Yoko - Drums and vocals. The latest addition to the eX-Girl lineup, replacing Chapple.

=== Previous members ===
- Chapple - Former drummer and vocalist, she replaced Fuzuki and departed sometime in 2005. Her difficulty with the English language did not stop her from resonating charisma with her impeccable drumming and tendency to rarely refrain from smiling.
- Zorek - Former guitarist and vocalist. Replaced Keikos afterward. Departed from the band when Keikos returned. The more intricate guitar player of the band.
- Fuzuki - Former drummer and vocalist. The original drummer for eX-Girl, she had a troglodytic sound due playing a stand-up kit. When behind a traditional kit, she was known to belt the floor tom with her stick.
- Chihiro - Former guitarist and vocalist. The original guitarist who was not afraid to experiment despite her limited experience with the instrument.

== Discography ==
=== Albums ===
- Heppoco Pou (1998)
- Kero! Kero! Kero! (1999)
- Big When Far, Small When Close (2000)
- Back to the Mono Kero (2001)
- Endangered Species (2004)

=== Best of ===
- Revenge of Kero Kero (2000)

=== Singles/EPs ===
- "Disco 3000" (2000), 12-inch vinyl picture disc, released in US only
- "Pop Muzik" (2001), a cover version of the 1979 song by M
- "Luna Rose" (2002)

=== Other works ===
- The Legend of the Waterbreakers (1999), Kiki Poo Records - a film by Naoko Nozawa, starring Ex-Girl, produced by Hoppy Kamiyama
