= Robin Scott =

Robin Scott may refer to:

- Robin Scott (singer), English musician best known for his releases as M
- Robin Scott (broadcasting executive) (1920–2000), BBC radio and television controller
- Robin Scott (Victorian politician) (Robin David Scott, born 1973), member of the Victorian Legislative Assembly
- Robin Scott (Western Australian politician) (Robin David Scott), member of the Western Australian Legislative Council
- Robin Wilson (author) (1928–2013), American science fiction author who writes under the pen name Robin Scott
