= Endangered Species (eX-Girl album) =

Studio album by eX-Girl
- Released: April 13, 2004
- Studio: GOK Sound (Tokyo)
- Length: 49:37
- Label: Alternative Tentacles
- Producer: Hoppy Kamiyama

EX-Girl chronology
Back to the Mono Kero (2001)	Endangered Species (2004)

Professional ratings
Review scores
Source	Rating
AllMusic	4/5 stars
Ox-Fanzine	9/10
Tiny Mix Tapes	4/5 marks

Endangered Species is the fifth studio album by Japanese girl band eX-Girl. Unlike previous albums it was first released outside Japan, on Jello Biafra's Alternative Tentacles label (catalog number Virus 313). The line-up is credited as Kirilola (previously known as Kirilo), Chapple and Keikos. Zorek is only on the front cover of the album but played on the tour, after Keikos departed. Some tracks feature previous band members Fuzuki (drums). Keikos later returned to the band after Zorek departed. As usual, the album was produced by the band's mentor and collaborator, Hoppy Kamiyama.

== Track listing ==
1. "E-SA-YA" (Lyrics: Kirilola / Music: Kirilola, Hoppy Kamiyama) – 5:24
2. "Hettakorii no Ottokotou" (Lyrics: Kirilola / Music: Kamiyama, Kirilola) – 5:13
3. "Pretty You Ugly" (Lyrics: Fuzuki, Kirilola, Keikos / Music: Kamiyama, Kirilola) – 3:57
4. "Pujeva" (Lyrics: Kirilola / Music: Kamiyama) – 4:47
5. "New Pulse" (Lyrics: Kirilola / Music: Kamiyama) – 3:47
6. "Venus vs. Gas Onna" (Lyrics: Kirilola, Keikos / Music: Kamiyama) – 4:35
7. "Rocket Keronian" (Lyrics: Kirilola, Keikos / Music: Kamiyama, Kirilola) – 4:29
8. "Resonance" (Lyrics: Kirilola / Music: Kamiyama) – 5:37
9. "Endangered Species" (Music: Kamiyama) – 0:39
10. "Dodo" (Lyrics: Kirilola / Music: Kamiyama) – 3:35
11. "The Letter from Mr. Triscuits" (Lyrics: Kirilola / Music: Kamiyama) – 7:34

== Personnel ==
- Kirilola – vocals, bass, Casiotone, Korg synthesizer.
- Chapple – vocals, drums.
- Zorek – front cover photo
- Keikos – vocals, guitar.
- Fuzuki – vocals (1, 3, 4), drums.
- Hoppy Kamiyama – Digital President, ass hole box, slide geisha, scum tape from the garbage, okama belcanto, gram pot.
- Steve Eto – tom-tom (1).
- Yoshihiko Eida – violin (1).
- Midori Eida – violin (1).
- Yuji Yamada – violin (1).
- Yoshihiko Maeda – cello (1).

== Production ==
- Hoppy Kamiyama – producer, string arrangement.
- Yoshiaki Kondo – recording and mixing at GOK Sound Studio, Tokyo.
- Masayo Takise – mastering at M's Disc, Tokyo.
- GORO – art work, photography, make-up.
- Miki Ishida – hair stylist.
- Fumio Takanezawa – Frog King design.
- Renge – Frog King manufacture.
- Yukalin, Miho, Renge, Dake-chan, Naomi – costumes.
