= List of number-one hits of 1979 (Germany) =

This is a list of the German Media Control Top100 Singles Chart number-ones of 1979.

Issue date	Song	Artist
1 January	"Y.M.C.A."	Village People
8 January	"Mary's Boy Child"	Boney M.
15 January	"Y.M.C.A."	Village People
22 January	"Y.M.C.A."	Village People
29 January	"Y.M.C.A."	Village People
5 February	"Y.M.C.A."	Village People
12 February	"Y.M.C.A."	Village People
19 February	"Y.M.C.A."	Village People
26 February	"Y.M.C.A."	Village People
5 March	"Heart of Glass"	Blondie
12 March	"Heart of Glass"	Blondie
19 March	"Heart of Glass"	Blondie
26 March	"Heart of Glass"	Blondie
2 April	"Heart of Glass"	Blondie
9 April	"Heart of Glass"	Blondie
16 April	"Dschinghis Khan"	Dschinghis Khan
23 April	"Dschinghis Khan"	Dschinghis Khan
30 April	"Dschinghis Khan"	Dschinghis Khan
7 May	"Dschinghis Khan"	Dschinghis Khan
14 May	"Born to Be Alive"	Patrick Hernandez
21 May	"Born to Be Alive"	Patrick Hernandez
28 May	"Born to Be Alive"	Patrick Hernandez
4 June	"Born to Be Alive"	Patrick Hernandez
11 June	"Born to Be Alive"	Patrick Hernandez
18 June	"Pop Muzik"	M
25 June	"Pop Muzik"	M
2 July	"Pop Muzik"	M
9 July	"Pop Muzik"	M
16 July	"Pop Muzik"	M
23 July	"Pop Muzik"	M
30 July	"So Bist Du"	Peter Maffay
6 August	"So Bist Du"	Peter Maffay
13 August	"So Bist Du"	Peter Maffay
20 August	"El Lute"	Boney M.
27 August	"El Lute"	Boney M.
3 September	"El Lute"	Boney M.
10 September	"El Lute"	Boney M.
17 September	"El Lute"	Boney M.
24 September	"El Lute"	Boney M.
1 October	"El Lute"	Boney M.
8 October	"El Lute"	Boney M.
15 October	"We Don't Talk Anymore"	Cliff Richard
22 October	"We Don't Talk Anymore"	Cliff Richard
29 October	"We Don't Talk Anymore"	Cliff Richard
5 November	"We Don't Talk Anymore"	Cliff Richard
12 November	"We Don't Talk Anymore"	Cliff Richard
19 November	"Maybe"	Thom Pace
26 November	"Maybe"	Thom Pace
3 December	"Maybe"	Thom Pace
10 December	"Maybe"	Thom Pace
17 December	"Maybe"	Thom Pace
24 December	"Maybe"	Thom Pace
31 December	"Maybe"	Thom Pace

== See also ==
- List of number-one hits (Germany)
