= Famous Last Words (M album) =

Studio album by M
- Released: 1982
- Studios: Redan (London); Townhouse (London); Lombard (Dublin)
- Genres: New wave; synth-pop
- Length: 42:50
- Label: Sire
- Producer: Robin Scott

M chronology
The Official Secrets Act (1980)	Famous Last Words (1982)	Jive Shikisha! (1998)

Professional ratings
Review scores
Source	Rating
AllMusic	2/5 stars

Famous Last Words is the third studio album by the English new wave and synth-pop music project M, released in 1982 by Sire Records. It featured many of the musicians from M's previous studio albums, including the early incarnation of Level 42 (who by this time were having their own regular hits), Wally Badarou on keyboards, Robin Scott's brother Julian on bass guitar, Brigit Novik on lead and backing vocals, a young Thomas Dolby on synthesizers and sequencing, Yellow Magic Orchestra (YMO) drummer Yukihiro Takahashi, Gang of Four guitarist Andy Gill and Tony Levin on bass guitar. MCA Records declined release of the album in the UK, and it was only released in France, Italy and the US (Warner-Sire Records).

== Critical reception ==
In a retrospective review for Trouser Press, critic Jon Young wrote that "[Robin] Scott confirmed his status as a doodler on Famous Last Words: no two tunes are alike. Everything's a little odd, but never unpleasantly so. In short, this third LP possesses only the limited value of cleverness in a vacuum. One longs for less calculation, and references beyond the studio."

== Track listing ==
Side one
No.	Title	Writer(s)	Length
1.	"Doubletalk"	Robin Scott	3:26
2.	"The Bridge"	Scott; Nick Plytas	4:46
3.	"Honolulu Joe"	Scott; Plytas	4:04
4.	"Love Life"	Scott	4:19
5.	"Yellow Magic"	Scott	5:01

Side two
No.	Title	Writer(s)	Length
1.	"Smash the Mirror"	Scott; Plytas	4:57
2.	"Neutron"	Scott	4:16
3.	"Dance on the Ruins"	Scott	4:06
4.	"Here Today Gone Tomorrow"	Plytas	4:40
5.	"To Be Is to Buy"	Plytas	3:15
Total length:			42:50

1998 Westside CD Reissue
No.	Title	Writer(s)	Length
1.	"Doubletalk"	Scott	3:26
2.	"The Bridge"	Scott; Plytas	4:46
3.	"Honolulu Joe"	Scott; Plytas	4:04
4.	"Love Life"	Scott	4:19
5.	"Yellow Magic"	Scott	5:01
6.	"Smash the Mirror"	Scott; Plytas	4:57
7.	"Neutron"	Scott	4:16
8.	"Dance on the Ruins"	Scott	4:06
9.	"Here Today Gone Tomorrow"	Plytas	4:40
10.	"To Be Is to Buy"	Plytas	3:15
11.	"Eureka" (Re-Visited '92)	Scott	3:29
12.	"Eureka" (Original Version)	Scott	6:14
13.	"Love Inferno"	Scott	3:37
14.	"Love Inferno" (Narrative)	Scott	3:03
15.	"The Bridge" (featuring Lydia Cannan)	Scott	4:35
16.	"Guardian Angel"	Scott	4:23
17.	"I'm No Angel"	Scott	4:14

== Personnel ==
Credits are adapted from the Famous Last Words liner notes.

M

- Robin Scott – lead and background vocals, Roland TR-808, piano

Session musicians

- Brigit Novik – lead and background vocals
- Nick Plytas – organ, Moog synthesizer bass, piano, backing vocals
- Gary Barnacle – saxophones
- Wally Badarou – synthesizers; sequencing
- John Lewis – synthesizers; sequencing
- Thomas Dolby – synthesizers; sequencing
- Yukihiro Takahashi – drums
- Sergio Castillo – drums
- Andy Anderson – drums
- Barry Adamson – bass guitar
- Tony Levin – bass guitar
- Julian Scott – bass guitar
- Mark King – bass guitar
- Jamie West – guitars
- Gordon Huntley – guitars
- Andy Gill – guitars
- Mary Bird – backing vocals
- Marlisse – backing vocals
- Steve – backing vocals

Technical

- Robin Scott – producer
- Nick Launay – engineer
- Steve Travell – assistant engineer
- Jean-Baptiste Mondino – photography
- Linda Witham – photography
