= That's the Way the Money Goes (song) =

Single by M

from the album New York–London–Paris–Munich
- B-side: "Satisfy Your Lust (Before You Go Bust)"
- Released: 22 February 1980
- Studio: Mountain (Montreux, Switzerland)
- Genre: New wave; synth-pop
- Length: 4:27
- Label: MCA (UK); Sire (US)
- Songwriter: Robin Scott
- Producer: Robin Scott

M singles chronology
"Moonlight and Muzak" (1979)	"That's the Way the Money Goes" (1980)	"Official Secrets" (1980)

Music video
- "That's the Way the Money Goes" on YouTube

"That's the Way the Money Goes" is a song by the English new wave and synth-pop music project M, released as both a 7" and 12" single from their debut studio album, New York–London–Paris–Munich (1979). The single was released by MCA Records in the UK, and Sire Records in the US, it peaked at No. 45 on the UK singles chart, and No. 38 on the US Billboard Hot Dance Club Play (their final chart placing there).

== Background ==
The lyrics explore economic concepts, inflation, and the stock market, comparing financial systems to a game or a casino, which is reflected in the cover art. The core phrase itself dates back centuries in English usage, historically reflecting the cost of living or the loss of funds.

The back cover of the single offered one person, and their companion the chance to win seven nights in New York City, via British Airways, if their copy of the record said "it's a winner, it's your lucky day", with 500 runner-ups being given free copies of its parent album New York–London–Paris–Munich.

== Critical reception ==
Record World wrote that the single is a "loveable electronic dancer here that's sure to be a staple on AOR and the club circuit," particularly praising the keyboards.

== Track listing ==
1. "That's the Way the Money Goes" – 3:51
2. ”Satisfy Your Lust (Before You Go Bust)" – 3:26

== Chart performance ==
Chart	Peak position
UK Singles (Official Charts)	45
US Billboard Hot Dance Club Play	38
