= Big When Far, Small When Close =

Studio album by eX-Girl
- Released: 1999
- Length: 25:22
- Label: Paranoiz
- Producer: Hoppy Kamiyama

EX-Girl chronology
Kero! Kero! Kero! (1999)	Big When Far, Small When Close (1999)	Back to the Mono Kero (2001)

Big When Far, Small When Close is the third studio album by Japanese band eX-Girl, released in 1999, on the Paranoiz label in Japan (PAR-50024), and by Kiki Poo Records in the US (KPCD-001).

The line-up consisted of Chihiro, Kirilo and Fuzuki, and the album was produced by Hoppy Kamiyama.

Several of the tracks are sung a capella apart from the odd chime, triangle or hand clap. Exceptions are Zozoi with its tribal-esque drumming, Dandera Korabatten with some repeated background instrumentation, and Alabama Song with a carnival-esque brass and clarinet arrangement.

== Track listing ==
1. "Neanderthal & Cro-Magnon" (Lyrics: Kirilo, Hoppy Kamiyama / Music: Kamiyama) – 0:50
2. "Souvlaki" (Lyrics: eX-Girl, Kamiyama / Music: eX-Girl, Kamiyama) – 4:26
3. "Zozoi" (Lyrics: Kirilo / Music: eX-Girl) – 4:28
4. "Jet Mogura" (Lyrics: Kirilo / Music: eX-Girl, Kamiyama) – 3:20
5. "Dandera Korabatten" (Lyrics: Chihiro / Music: eX-Girl, Kamiyama) – 3:51
6. "Disco 3000" (Lyrics: Chihiro / Music: eX-Girl, Kamiyama) – 3:19
7. "Alabama Song" (Lyrics: Bertolt Brecht / Music: Kurt Weill) – 3:52
8. "Big When Far, Small When Close" (Lyrics: Kamiyama / Music: eX-Girl) – 1:12

== Personnel ==
- Chihiro – vocals, hand claps, stepping
- Kirilo – vocals, hand claps, stepping
- Fuzuki – vocals, hand claps, stepping, bell
- Hoppy Kamiyama – floor tom, cymbal, sample, gram pot
- Masafumi Minato – floor tom, tom-tom, cymbal
- Takerô Sekijima – tuba, trombone, trumpet
- Kanji Nakao – clarinet, trombone, wood block

== Production ==
- Hoppy Kamiyama – record producer
- Takerô Sekijima – brass arrangement
- Jin Terada – recording and mixing November 8–11, 13, 14, 1999 at MIT studio, Sound Atelier
- Yoshiaki Kondo – mastering at Kojima Recordings
- Kazvnori Akita – graphic design
- Jimmy Henda – photography
- Yukari Terakura – costumes
- eX-Girl – illustrations
- Ray – illustration (Frog Prince)
