= Moonlight and Muzak =

Single by M

from the album New York–London–Paris–Munich
- B-side: "Woman Make Man"
- Released: 16 November 1979
- Studio: Mountain (Montreux, Switzerland)
- Genre: New wave; synth-pop
- Length: 5:36
- Label: MCA (UK); Sire (US)
- Songwriter: Robin Scott
- Producer: Robin Scott

M singles chronology
"Pop Muzik" (1979)	"Moonlight and Muzak" (1979)	"That's the Way the Money Goes" (1980)

Music video
- "Moonlight and Muzak" on YouTube

"Moonlight and Muzak" is a song by the English new wave and synth-pop music project M, released as both a 7" and 12" single from their debut studio album, New York–London–Paris–Munich (1979). The single was released by MCA Records in the UK, and Sire Records in the US, it peaked at No. 33 on the UK singles chart, and No. 37 on the Australian singles chart (their final chart placing there). It was the follow up to the transatlantic hit "Pop Muzik". In 1997, Robin Scott described the single (his choice) as "deliberate corporate sabotage".

== Background ==
The track was written as a result of Robin Scott's experiences in the US, where he had come into contact with the Muzak organisation, which he described as "a very weird experience. There were all these white collar workers conscientously putting together music with the precision of chemists. Way before [Brain] Eno was doing it, these guys were doing it for real. They were preoccupied with the pace of workers in factories, and how to maximise efficiency."

== Critical reception ==
Cash Box wrote that the single uses "synthesized electronic effects to create an airy Latin rhythm behind [M/Robin Scott's] spoken vocals."

== Track listing ==
12"

1. "Moonlight and Muzak (Full Length Version)" – 5:26
2. "Woman Make Man" – 2:11

== Chart performance ==
Chart	Peak position
Australia (Kent Music Report)	37
UK Singles (Official Charts)	33
US Billboard Hot Dance Club Play	38
