= New York–London–Paris–Munich =

New York • London • Paris • Munich

Studio album by M
- Released: 30 November 1979 (UK)
- Recorded: Autumn 1978
- Studios: Mountain (Montreux, Switzerland)
- Genres: New wave; art pop; synth-pop; disco
- Length: 39:03
- Labels: MCA; Sire/Warner Bros.
- Producer: Robin Scott

M chronology
| New York • London • Paris • Munich (1979) | The Official Secrets Act (1980) |

Singles from New York • London • Paris • Munich
- 1. "Moderne Man" Released: 3 November 1978; 2. "Pop Muzik" Released: 16 March 1979; 3. "Moonlight and Muzak" Released: 16 November 1979; 4. "That's the Way the Money Goes" Released: 22 February 1980

New York · London · Paris · Munich is the debut studio album by the English new wave and synth-pop music project M, released on 30 November 1979 by MCA Records. Its title was taken from a line in the verse of the March 1979 hit single "Pop Muzik", an extended version of which is featured on the album. Alongside M founder Robin Scott, the album features future Level 42 members and collaborators Phil Gould on drums, Wally Badarou on keyboards and Gary Barnacle on saxophone and flute.

== Critical reception ==
Professional ratings
Review scores
| Source | Rating |
|---|---|
| AllMusic | 4.5/5 stars |
| Christgau's Record Guide | C |
| Smash Hits | 9/10 |

In a retrospective review for AllMusic, critic Stephen Thomas Erlewine wrote that "there's actually quite a bit of entertaining music on the record. Granted, the sound of the record is more entertaining than the songwriting, but with its synthesized, danceable beats, big, catchy hooks, and glossy "futuristic" production, it's a terrific new wave artifact."

== Track listings ==
All tracks are written by Robin Scott.

Side A
| No. | Title | Length |
|---|---|---|
| 1. | "Pop Muzik" | 5:00 |
| 2. | "Woman Make Man" | 2:18 |
| 3. | "Moderne Man/Satisfy Your Lust" | 6:32 |
| 4. | "Made in Munich" | 5:36 |

Side B
| No. | Title | Length |
|---|---|---|
| 1. | "Moonlight and Muzak" | 5:36 |
| 2. | "That's the Way the Money Goes" | 4:27 |
| 3. | "Cowboys and Indians" | 3:54 |
| 4. | "Unite Your Nation" | 5:44 |
| Total length: | | 39:03 |

=== Reissues ===
1997 Westside re-release
| No. | Title | Length |
|---|---|---|
| 1. | "Pop Muzik '79" (Nick Launay 12" Mix) | 4:56 |
| 2. | "Woman Make Man" | 2:18 |
| 3. | "Moderne Man/Satisfy Your Lust" | 6:32 |
| 4. | "Made in Munich" | 5:36 |
| 5. | "Moonlight and Muzak" | 5:36 |
| 6. | "That's the Way the Money Goes" | 4:27 |
| 7. | "Cowboys and Indians" | 3:54 |
| 8. | "Unite Your Nation" | 5:44 |

Bonus tracks
| No. | Title | Length |
|---|---|---|
| 9. | "Fanfare" | 0:08 |
| 10. | "Cry Myself to Sleep" | 2:59 |
| 11. | "Cowboys and Indians" (Dead or a 'Live' Mix) | 3:11 |
| 12. | "Cowboys and Indians" (Featuring James Stewart) | 3:40 |
| 13. | "Satisfy Your Lust" (Single Version) | 3:12 |
| 14. | "Moderne Man" (Single Version) | 3:31 |
| 15. | "M Factor" (Single Version) | 2:26 |
| 16. | "M Factor" (US Single Version) | 2:29 |
| 17. | "Moonlight and Muzak" ('92 Remix) | 4:43 |
| 18. | "Pop Muzik" (Hip–Hop–Pop Muzik) | 3:10 |
| 19. | "Pop Muzik" (Latino Cappuccino) | 1:56 |
| 20. | "Pop Muzik" ('89 Reshuffle) | 3:53 |
| 21. | "Finale" | 0:14 |

2002 Razor & Tie re-release
| No. | Title | Length |
|---|---|---|
| 1. | "Pop Muzik" | 4:56 |
| 2. | "Woman Make Man" | 2:18 |
| 3. | "Moderne Man/Satisfy Your Lust" | 6:32 |
| 4. | "Made in Munich" | 5:36 |
| 5. | "Moonlight and Muzak" | 5:36 |
| 6. | "That's the Way the Money Goes" | 4:27 |
| 7. | "Cowboys and Indians" | 3:54 |
| 8. | "Unite Your Nation" | 5:44 |

Bonus tracks
| No. | Title | Length |
|---|---|---|
| 9. | "M Factor" | 2:26 |
| 10. | "Pop Muzik" (Hip–Hop–Pop Muzik) | 3:10 |
| 11. | "Cowboys and Indians" (Dead or a 'Live' Mix) | 3:11 |
| 12. | "Moonlight and Muzak" ('92 Remix) | 4:43 |
| 13. | "Pop Muzik" ('89 Reshuffle) | 3:53 |

== Charts ==
| Chart (1979–1980) | Peak position |
|---|---|
| Australia (Kent Music Report) | 97 |
| US Billboard 200 | 79 |

== Personnel ==
M

- Robin Scott – vocals, Roland Jupiter-4 synthesizer, guitar

Session musicians

- Brigit Novik Vinchon – harmony vocals
- Wally Badarou – keyboards, synthesizers
- Julian Scott – bass guitar
- Philip Gould – drums, percussion
- Gary Barnacle – saxophone, flute
- David Bowie – handclaps
- The Philharmonic Odd-Job Orchestra – orchestra on "Moderne Man/Satisfy Your Lust", arranged by Bobby Richards

Production

- Robin Scott – producer
- David Richards – engineer
- Rafe McKenna – engineer, recording, mixing
- Tim Hunt – engineer, recording, mixing
- Stan Kerr – front cover illustration
