= Kero! Kero! Kero! =

Studio album by eX-Girl
- Released: March 10, 1999
- Recorded: November–December, 1998
- Length: 44:35
- Label: Paranoiz
- Producer: Hoppy Kamiyama

EX-Girl chronology
Heppoco Pou (1998)	Kero! Kero! Kero! (1999)	Big When Far, Small When Close (2000)

Professional ratings
Revenge of Kero Kero
Review scores
Source	Rating
AllMusic	3/5 stars
Drowned in Sound	6/10
Kerrang!	4/5 stars

Kero! Kero! Kero! is the second studio album by Japanese a girl group eX-Girl, released on the PARANOIZ label in Japan (PAR-50020), and by KIKI Poo Records in the US. "Kero" is the sound a frog makes in the Japanese language, of. "ribbit" in English.

The line-up consisted of Chihiro, Kirilo and Fuzuki, and the album was produced by Hoppy Kamiyama.

== Track listing ==
1. "Disco 3000" (Lyrics: Chihiro / Music: eX-Girl, Hoppy Kamiyama) – 6:43.
2. "PUYO" (Lyrics: Kirilo / Music: eX-Girl, Kamiyama) – 2:47.
3. "The Revenge of Kero Kero" (Lyrics: Fuzuki / Music: eX-Girl, Kamiyama) – 6:00.
4. "Tofu Song" (Lyrics: Chihiro / Music: eX-Girl) – 2:01.
5. "HAO☆HAO" (Lyrics: Fuzuki / Music: eX-Girl, Kamiyama) – 3:50.
6. "Dazzle" (Lyrics: Kirilo / Music: eX-Girl) – 4:59.
7. "Chin Chiku Linn Part II" (Music: eX-Girl, Kamiyama) – 0:48.
8. "Spaceman, Melon" (Lyrics: eX-Girl / Music: eX-Girl, Kamiyama) – 4:02.
9. "Space Mushroom" (Lyrics: eX-Girl, Kamiyama / Music: eX-Girl, Kamiyama) – 13:21.

== Personnel ==
- Chihiro – vocals, electric guitar, acoustic guitar, Chromaharp.
- Kirilo – vocals, electric bass, Casiotone, Roland SH-101.
- Fuzuki – vocals, drums, metal, tambourine, gong, kengari.
- Hoppy Kamiyama – piano, SH-101, Emu II, metal, voice, Scum Tape from the Garbage, gram pot.
- Tomoko Umino – trumpet (M-3, M-9).
- Kunio Koizumi – trombone (M-3, M-9).
- Takerou Sekijima – tuba (M-3, M-9).

== Production ==
- Hoppy Kamiyama – record producer.
- Yoshiaki Kondo – recording at Gok Sounds, Tokyo, mastering at Kojima Recording.
- Yoshiaki Kondo and Hoppy Kamiyama – mixing at Gok Studios, Tokyo (November 27, 28, 30, December 1, 1998).
- Kazvnori Akita – design.
- Jimmy Henda – photography.
- Keita Ikeda – photography.
- Hirohiko Nogami – photography.
- eX-Girl – illustration.
- Ayumi – translation.
- Noami Hamada (Isyoya) – costumes.
- Makoto Suzuki, Ryuji Kusakawa, Toko Ueno – label staff.
