= Queen: The Studio Experience =

Museum in Montreux, Switzerland

Coordinates: 46°25′46.924″N 6°54′42.627″E

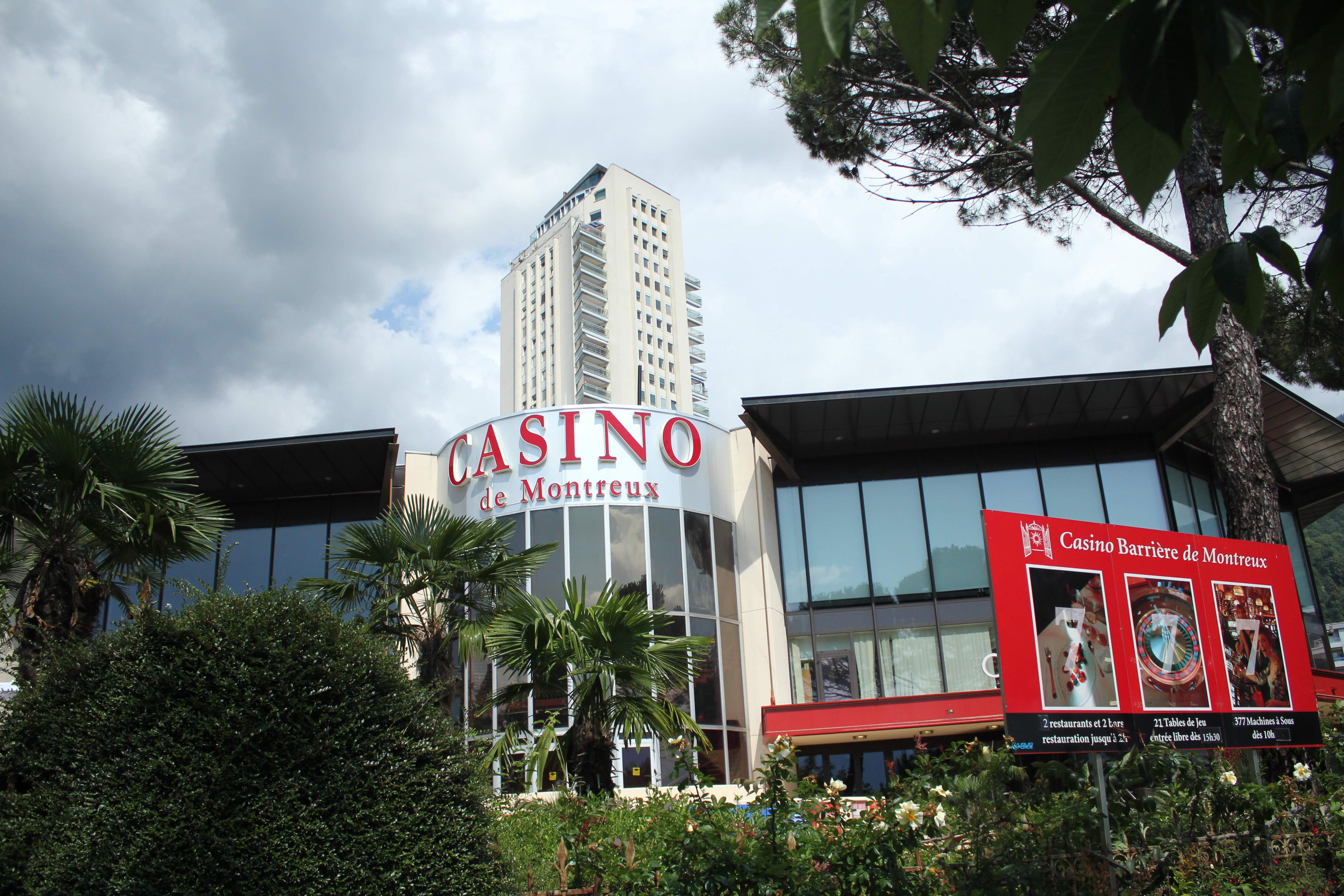
- Established: 2 December 2013
- Location: Casino Barrière de Montreux, Rue du Théâtre 9, 1820 Montreux, Switzerland
- Website: mercuryphoenixtrust.org/studioexperience

Queen: The Studio Experience is a museum in Montreux, Switzerland, dedicated to the British rock group Queen. It is located in the former Mountain Studios in the Casino Barrière de Montreux. Queen made recordings in the studio from 1978 to 1995. The museum was opened December 2, 2013 by band member Brian May.

== Collection ==
The museum showcases the history of the group Queen and their relationship with Montreux. The collection includes memorabilia from the band, such as handwritten song lyrics (including a concept version of One vision), costumes worn during performances, promotional material, and singles. Protected behind a plate of glass are the very last lines written by Freddie Mercury when he was at Montreux in 1991. There are also various musical instruments, such as John Deacon's bass guitar, Roger Taylor's drum set, and a replica of Brian May's guitar. The recording studio control room is unchanged from its original state, except for the original Neve mixing console, which has been replaced by a reproduction that allows visitors to create a re-mix of some of Queen's classic songs.

== History ==
Queen came to Montreux first in 1978 to record their album Jazz. At that time, Mountain Studios was known as one of the best-equipped recording studios in Europe, containing, among other things, a 24-track Swiss-made Studer recorder. The next year, the band bought the studio and also rented it out to other bands, like Led Zeppelin and Yes. Here, Queen recorded songs for seven of their own albums, including Bicycle Race (1978), Under Pressure (1981), and The Show Must Go On (1990). Bicycle Race was inspired by the Tour de France passing the town in 1978.

The studio was in the casino. The Mercury Phoenix Trust set up Queen: The Studio Experience. It is a small museum with no entry fee.

== Gallery ==
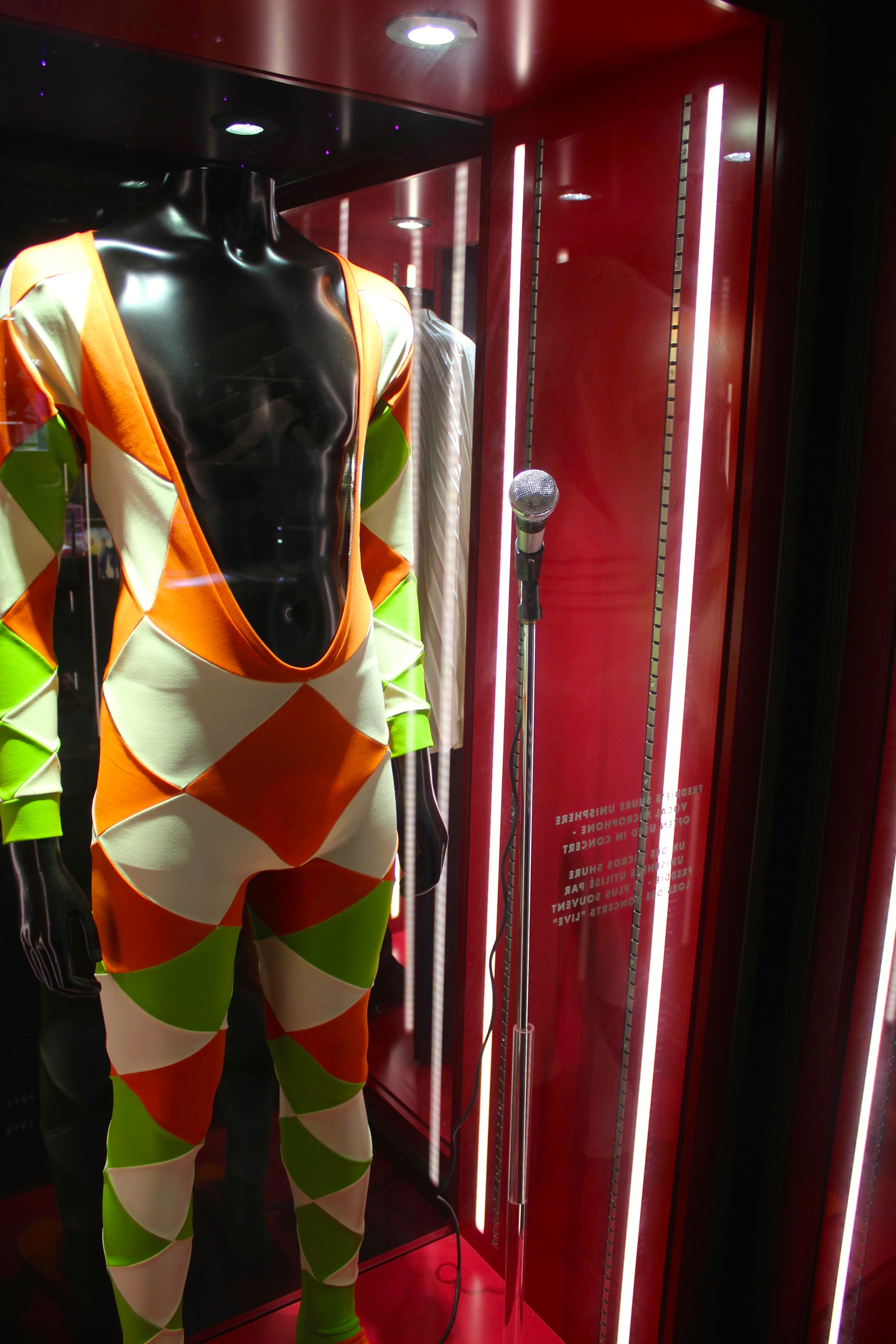
Queen outfit in the museum

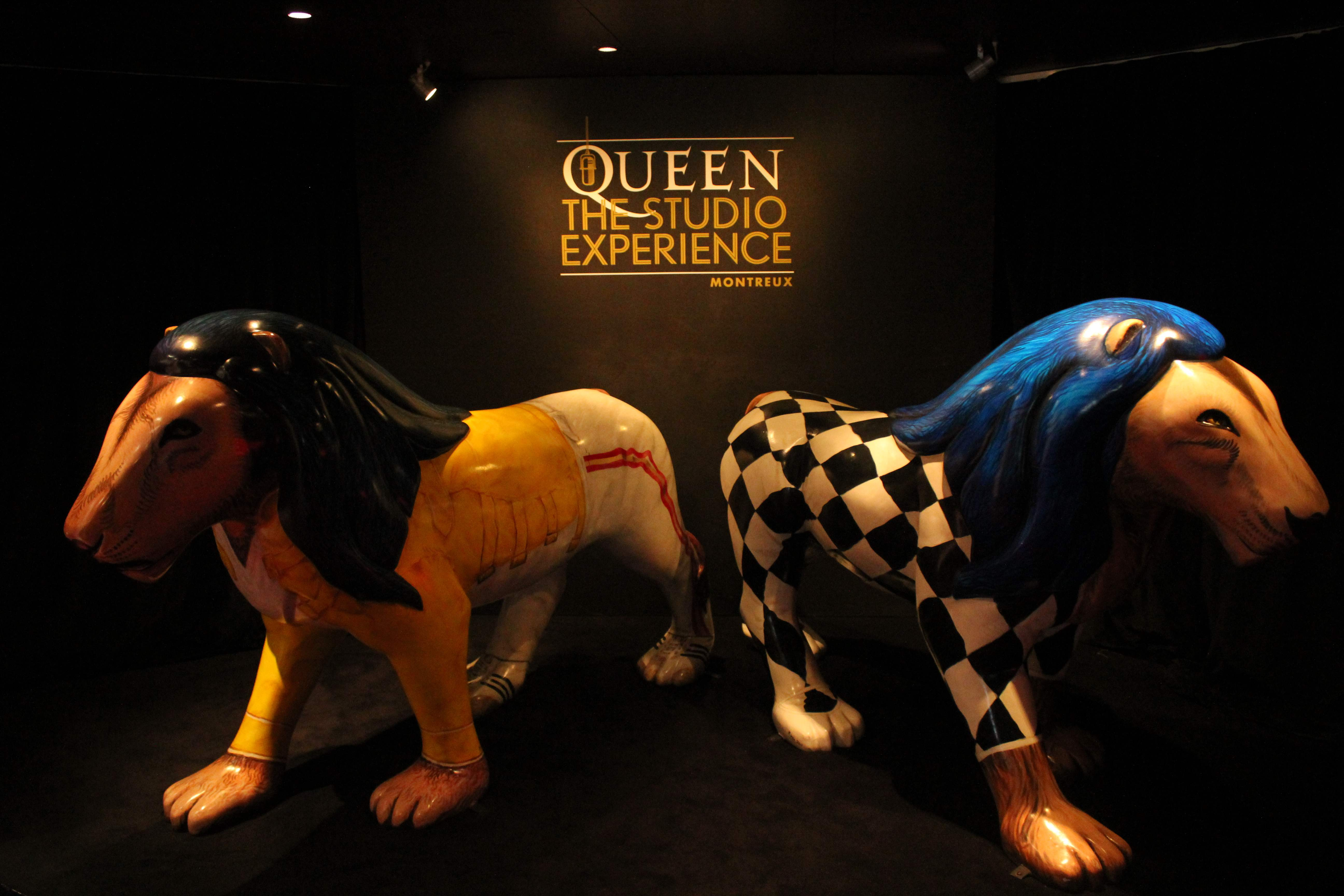
Entrance to the museum

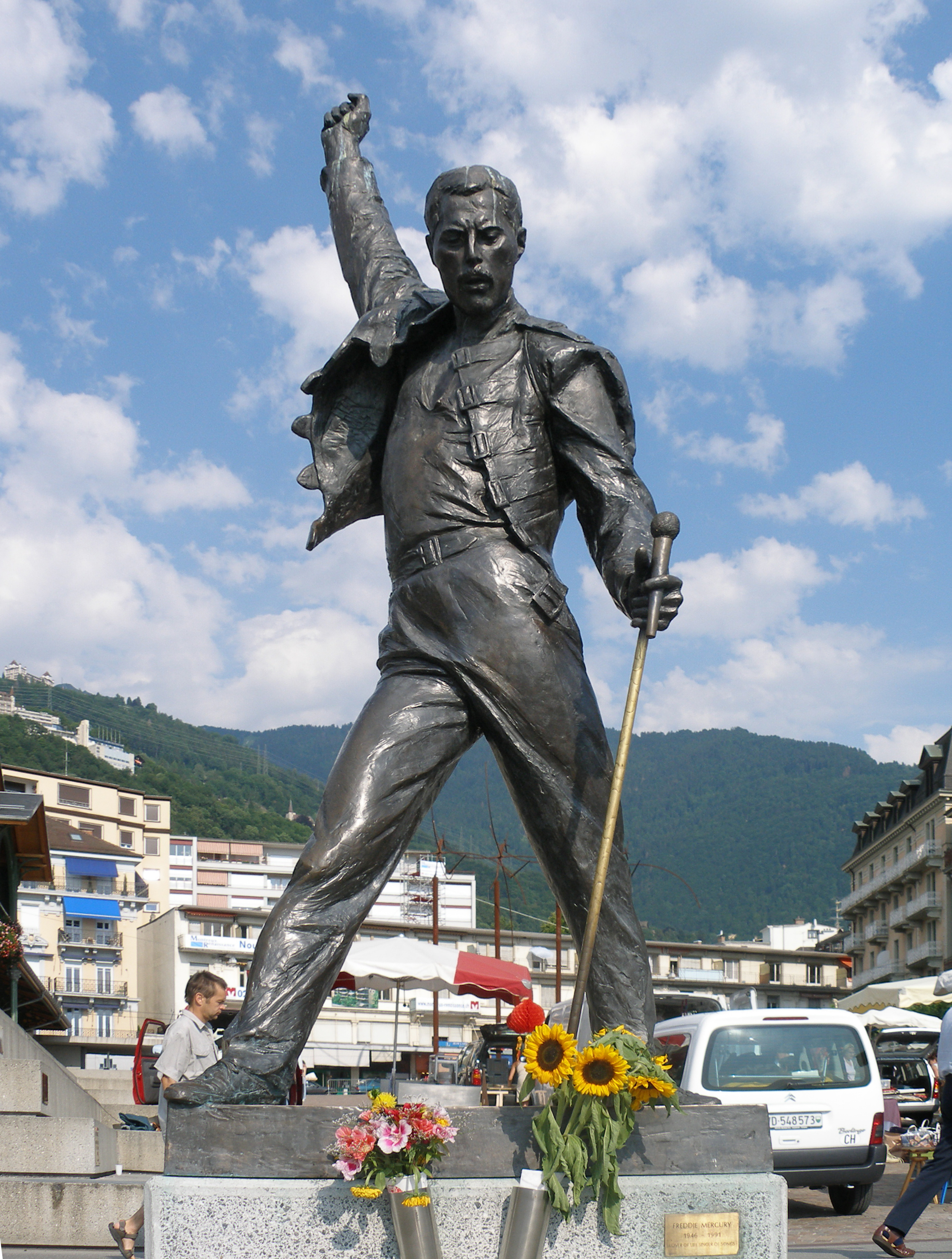
Statue of Freddie Mercury at the Place du Marché

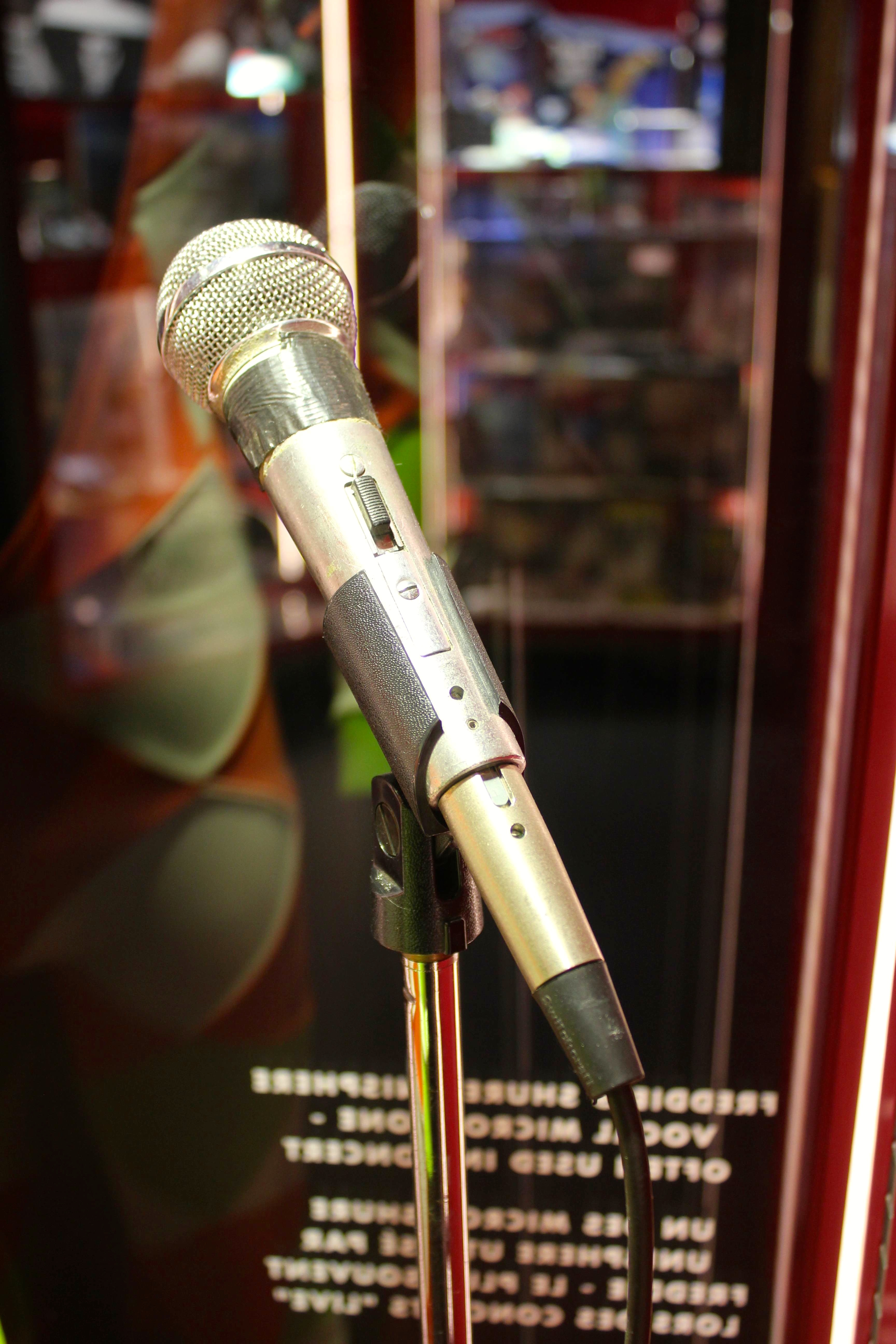
The microphone for the casino that was the only memory for years

== See also ==
- List of music museums
- List of museums in Switzerland
