= Montreux Casino =

Casino located in Montreux, Switzerland

Coordinates: 46.4295°N 6.9117°E

Casino Barrière de Montreux
- Casino de Montreux (French); Montreux-Kasino (German)
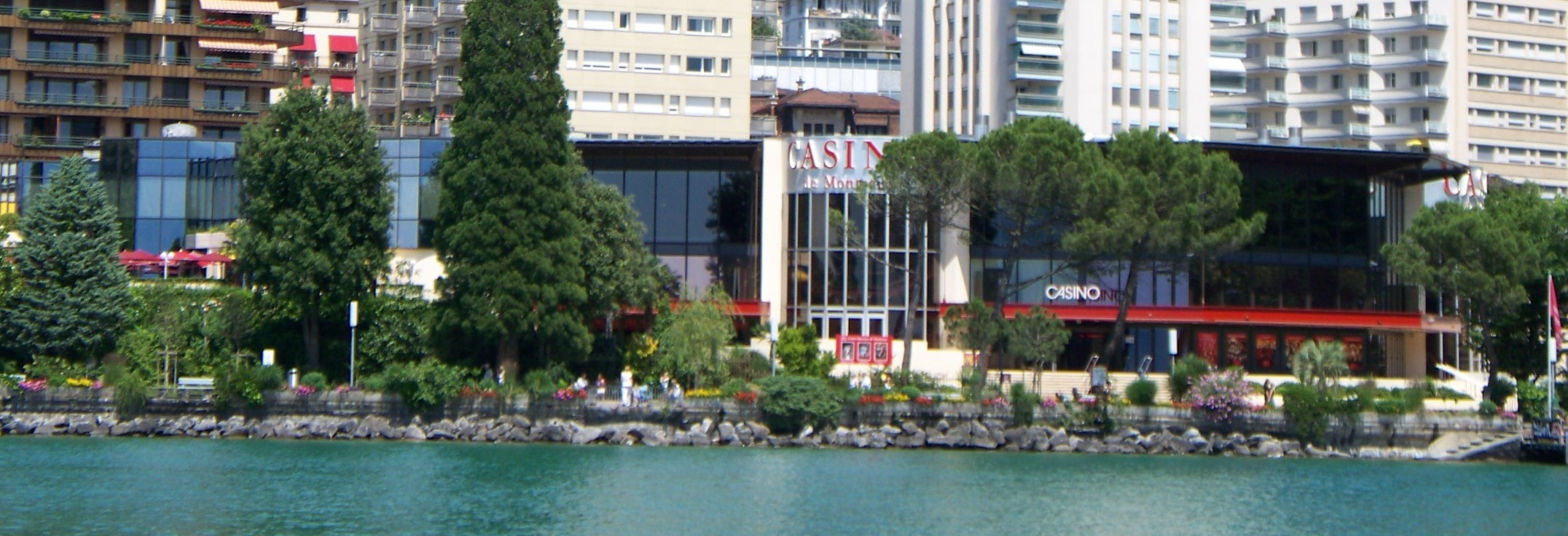
- Closeup of the Montreux Casino, rebuilt in 1975
- Interactive map of Casino Barrière de Montreux
- Location: Montreux, Switzerland
- Opened: 1881
- Permanent shows: Montreux Jazz Festival
- Owner: Groupe Lucien Barrière
- Renovated in: 1971 to 1975 (fully rebuilt)
- Website: Casino Barrière de Montreux site

Montreux Casino (Casino Barrière de Montreux) is a casino located in Montreux, Switzerland on the shoreline of Lake Geneva. It has served as the venue for the Montreux Jazz Festival and was rebuilt following a 1971 fire memorialized in the Deep Purple song "Smoke on the Water". It is a property of Groupe Lucien Barrière. The casino housed Mountain Studios which has since become the museum Queen: The Studio Experience.

== History ==
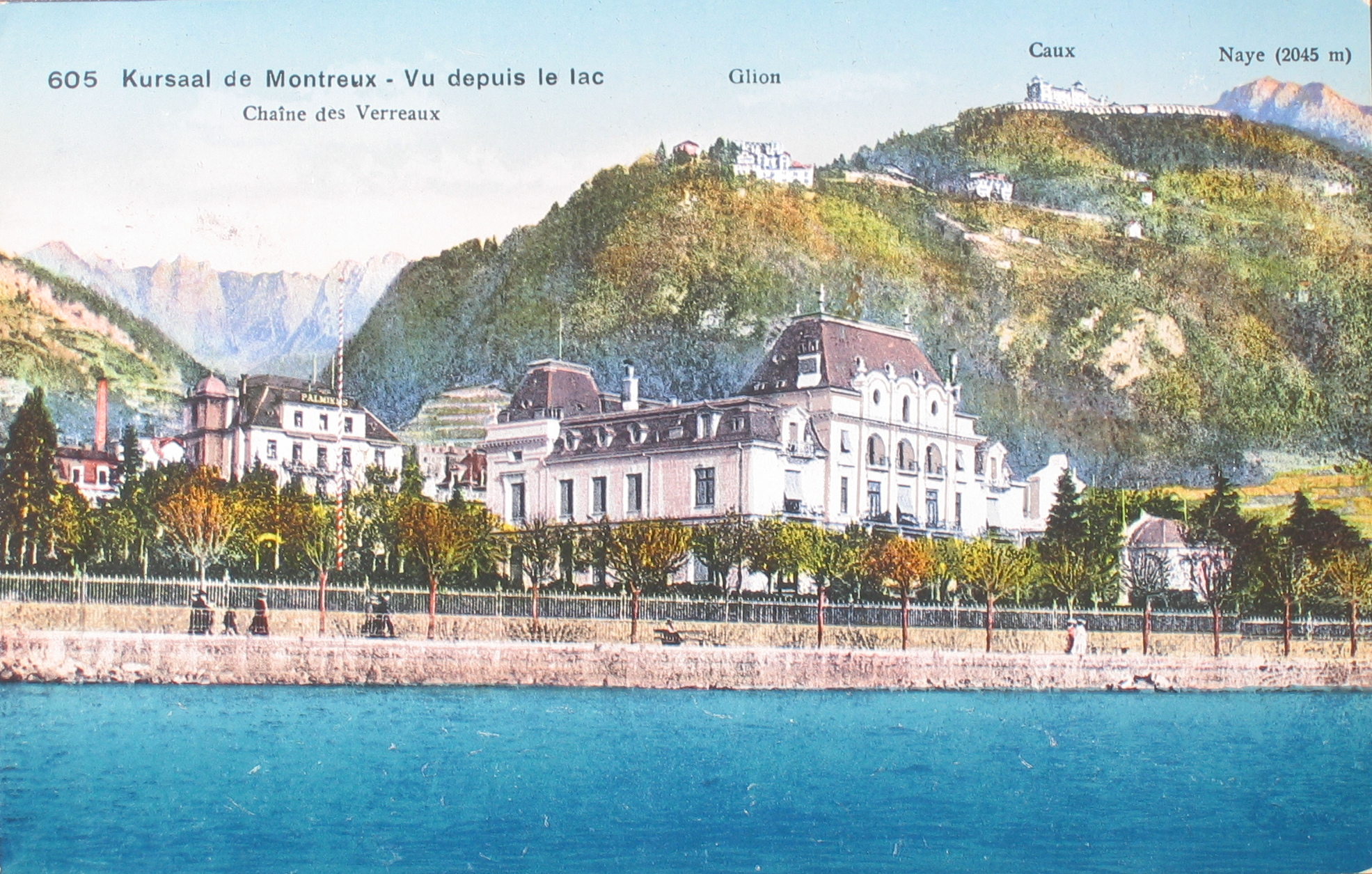
The casino—originally called "Kursaal"—in the early 20th century

Montreux Casino was built in 1881 and was modified in 1903. Throughout the 20th century, the site hosted many great symphony orchestras and well-known conductors. By the late 1960s, jazz, blues and rock artists began to perform there.

In 1967, the casino became the venue for the Montreux Jazz Festival, which was started by music promoter Claude Nobs. The three-day festival was held there annually and featured performers such as Keith Jarrett, Jack DeJohnette, Bill Evans, Nina Simone, Jan Garbarek, Etta James and Ella Fitzgerald. Originally featuring almost exclusively jazz artists, in the 1970s the festival began to include blues, soul, and rock artists such as Black Sabbath, Pink Floyd and Deep Purple.

=== 1971 fire ===
On December 4, 1971, Montreux Casino was destroyed by a fire that began during a concert by the Mothers of Invention after a fan, suspected by Swiss police to be Zdeněk Špička, a Czechoslovak refugee living in Épalinges, had shot a flare gun. A recording of the outbreak and fire announcement can be found on a Frank Zappa bootleg album titled Swiss Cheese/Fire!

English rock group Deep Purple, who had planned to record Machine Head at the venue, were forced to seek an alternative recording location. Their song "Smoke on the Water" was written about the incident:

We all came out to Montreux on the Lake Geneva shoreline / To make records with a mobile - We didn't have much time / Frank Zappa & the Mothers were at the best place around / But some stupid with a flare gun burned the place to the ground / Smoke on the water, a fire in the sky...

Frank Zappa calmly urged the concert attendees to evacuate. Mothers vocalist Mark Volman, cracking a joke in the process, added "Fire! Arthur Brown in person." Zappa continued, "If you'll just calmly go to the exits, ladies and gentlemen." The fire brigade was on scene in less than five minutes. The fire quickly spread out of control but, due to the orderly evacuation and the swift assistance of firefighters, no one was killed in the incident.

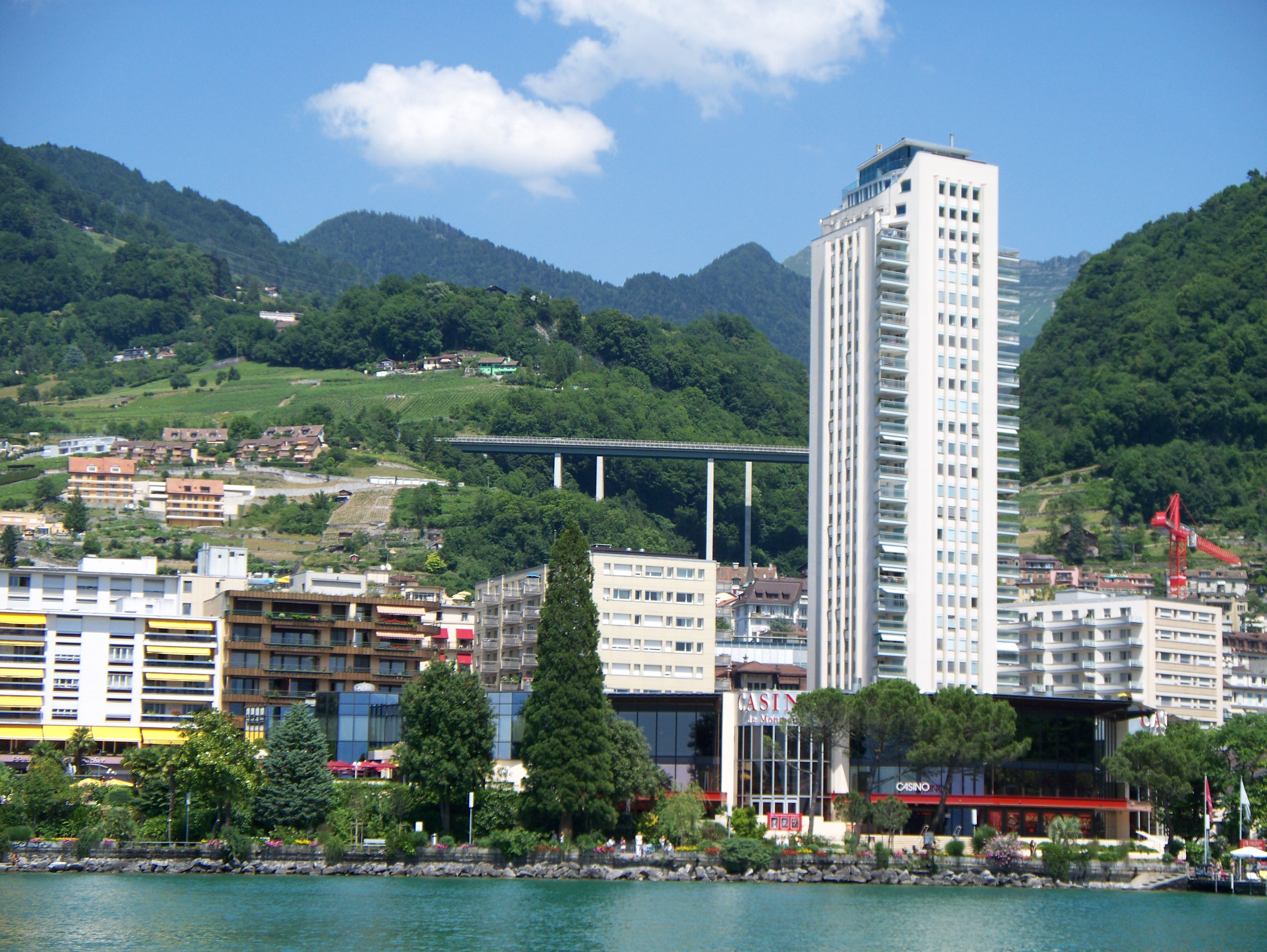
Montreux Casino as seen on Lake Geneva

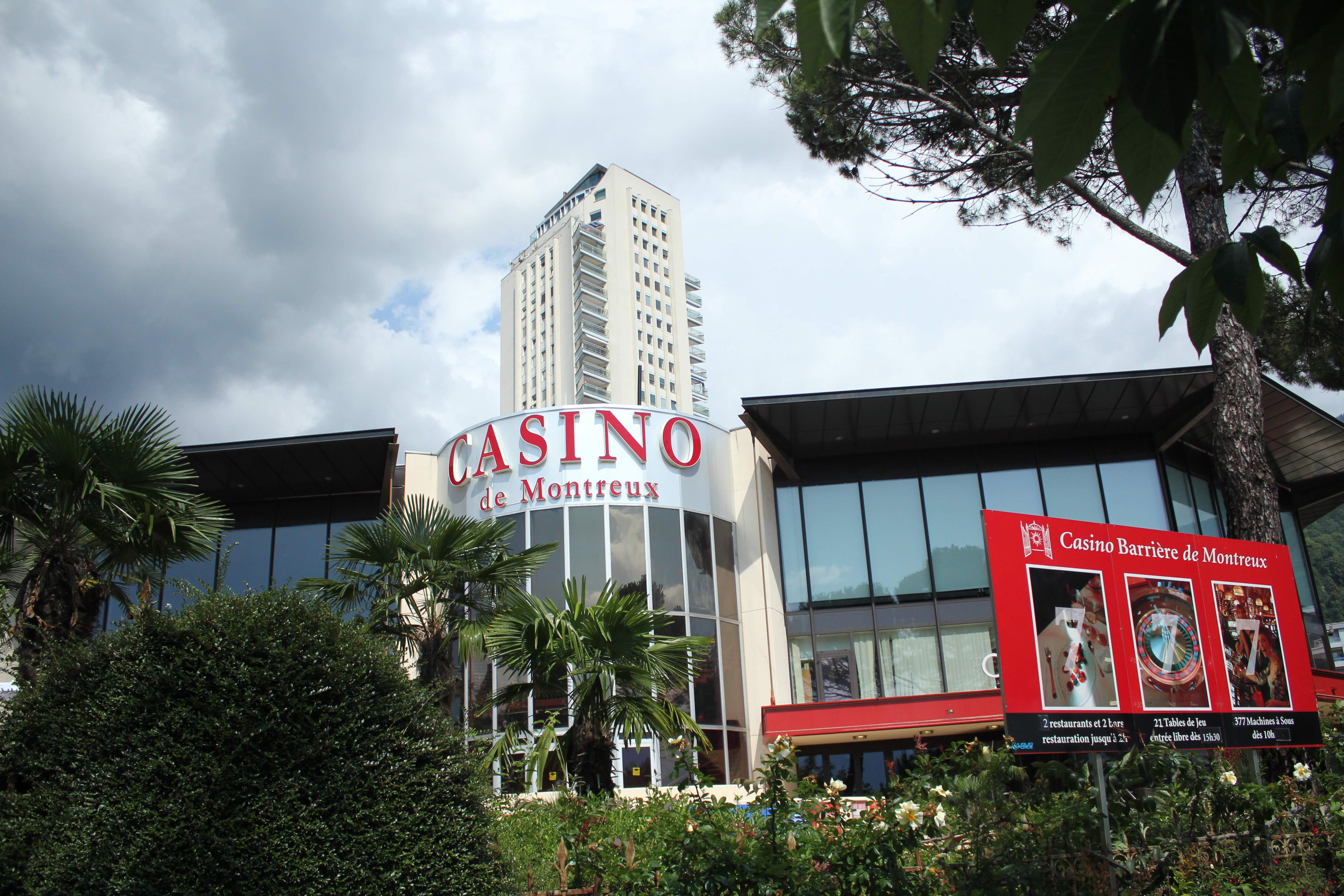
Montreux Casino 2014 summer

The casino was rebuilt, and until the venue reopened in 1975, the Montreux Jazz Festival was held in other auditoriums in Montreux. The festival continued to be hosted there until 1993, when it moved to the larger Montreux Convention Centre located approximately one kilometre from the casino. From 1995 through 2006, the festival occupied both the convention centre and the casino. Beginning with the 41st festival in 2007, nightly performances of headliners were again moved mainly to the convention centre, although the casino still occasionally hosts shows.

Within the newly rebuilt casino was Mountain Studios which recorded the Jazz Festival's live performances. In 2013, the studio was replaced by exhibit Queen: The Studio Experience.

== See also ==
- Gambling in Switzerland
