= The Official Secrets Act (album) =

Studio album by M
- Released: 7 November 1980
- Studio: Lombard (Dublin)
- Genre: New wave
- Length: 40:02
- Label: Sire
- Producer: Robin Scott

M chronology
New York • London • Paris • Munich (1979)	The Official Secrets Act (1980)	Famous Last Words (1982)

Singles from The Official Secrets Act
- 1. "Official Secrets" Released: 1980; 2. "Keep It to Yourself" Released: 1981

The Official Secrets Act is the second studio album by the English new wave and synth-pop music project M, released on 7 November 1980 by Sire Records. The track "Official Secrets" was released as a single and peaked at No. 64 on the UK singles chart in November 1980. The follow-up single was "Keep It to Yourself". The track "Maniac" featured Level 42 members Phil Gould on drums and Mark King on bass guitar. Robin Scott later described King as "a driving force" behind the album, as beyond playing bass, he also contributed guitar, and "animalistic" drums to the album, during sessions that would use two drummers at once.

The album title is a reference to the various UK Official Secrets Acts.

== Critical reception ==
Professional ratings
Review scores
Source	Rating
AllMusic	3/5 stars
Smash Hits	8/10

In a retrospective review for AllMusic, critic Dan LeRoy wrote that "if the sound of Official Secrets Act isn't quite as futuristic as its predecessor, Scott's lyrics preach pure sci-fi paranoia, heavily Orwell-ian and as obsessed with corporations and governments as Big Brothers. When the tunes are good, and a few are, it all makes for entertaining theater".

== Track listing ==
All tracks are written by Robin Scott, except where noted.

Side one
No.	Title	Length
1.	"Transmission (The World Is at Your Fingertips)"	4:30
2.	"Join the Party"	3:39
3.	"Working for the Corporation"	3:35
4.	"Your Country Needs You"	3:20
5.	"M'aider"	5:26

Side two
No.	Title	Writer(s)	Length
1.	"Relax"		3:42
2.	"Maniac"		3:22
3.	"Keep It to Yourself"		3:34
4.	"Abracadabra"	Scott; Brigit Novik	2:51
5.	"Official Secrets"		6:03
Total length:			40:02

1997 Westside CD Reissue
No.	Title	Writer(s)	Length
1.	"Transmission"		4:30
2.	"Join the Party"		3:39
3.	"Working for the Corporation"		3:35
4.	"Your Country Needs You"		3:20
5.	"Mayday"		5:26
6.	"Relax"		3:42
7.	"Maniac"		3:22
8.	"Keep It to Yourself"		3:34
9.	"Abracadabra"	Scott; Novik	2:51
10.	"Official Secrets"		6:03
11.	"Abracadabra" (Sunset–Sunrise Mix)	Scott; Novik	2:51
12.	"Danube"	Scott; Novik	3:33
13.	"The Wedding Dance"	Scott; Novik	3:37
14.	"Mambo La"	Unknown	2:29
15.	"Don't Believe What the Papers Say"		1:12
16.	"The Bride of Fortune"	Scott; Westwood	4:20

== Personnel ==
M

- Robin Scott – vocals, guitar; whistling on "Working for the Corporation"

Session musicians

- Brigit Vinchon – vocals; whistling on "Working for the Corporation"
- David Vorhaus – synthesizer
- Wally Badarou – synthesizer
- Julian Scott – bass guitar
- Philip Gould – drums
- Mark King – guitar, drums; bass on "Maniac"
- Gary Barnacle – saxophone
- Paddy Keenan – uilleann pipes on "Keep It to Yourself"
- Dónal Lunny – arrangement on "Keep It to Yourself"
- Bill Whelan – arrangements on "Relax" and "Official Secrets"
- The Dublin Symphony Orchestra – orchestra on "Relax" and "Official Secrets"; Audrey Parkes – leader
- Billy Brown – vocals and whistling on "Working for the Corporation"
- Deidre Costello – vocals and whistling on "Working for the Corporation"
- Denis Blackham – vocals and whistling on "Working for the Corporation"
- Des Smith – vocals and whistling on "Working for the Corporation"
- John Keogh – vocals and whistling on "Working for the Corporation"
- Mog Aherne – vocals and whistling on "Working for the Corporation"

Technical

- Dave Aston – engineer
- Denis Blackham – engineer
- Philip Begley – engineer
- Peter Ashworth – front cover photography
