= Vigilante (Magnum album) =

Studio album by Magnum
- Released: 26 September 1986
- Recorded: Mountain Studios, Montreux, Switzerland, 1986
- Genre: Hard rock
- Length: 43:36
- Label: Polydor
- Producer: Roger Taylor, David Richards

Magnum chronology
On a Storyteller's Night (1985)	Vigilante (1986)	Mirador (1987)

Professional ratings
Review scores
Source	Rating
AllMusic	2/5 stars
Kerrang!	5/5 stars

Vigilante is the sixth studio album by the English rock band Magnum, released in 1986 on Polydor.

Capitalising on the success of On a Storyteller's Night, Magnum changed to a more commercial direction with Vigilante. Produced by David Richards and Queen drummer Roger Taylor, the band's sound stepped towards that of 1980s Queen, with keyboards much higher in the mix than guitar. The album was recorded at Queen's famous Mountain Studios in Montreux. Three singles were released to promote the album, "Lonely Night", "Midnight (You Won't Be Sleeping)" and "When the World Comes Down".

Tracks such as "Lonely Night", "Need a Lot of Love", "Midnight (You Won't Be Sleeping)" and "Vigilante" laid the groundwork for the group to reach their commercial and creative peak on their follow-up UK Top 5 album, Wings of Heaven.

Vigilante entered the UK national charts at No. 24, and No. 11 in the Heavy Metal charts. The album was well received in Europe, charting at No. 16 in Sweden and No. 59 in Germany, along with a worldwide release in Japan, USA and Canada.

While the band had wanted Rodney Matthews to paint the artwork, the record company chose a different cover against the band's wishes.

== Track listing ==
All tracks are written by Tony Clarkin.

Original 1986 release
No.	Title	Length
1.	"Lonely Night"	3:48
2.	"Need a Lot of Love"	4:46
3.	"Sometime Love"	4:20
4.	"Midnight (You Won't Be Sleeping)"	4:01
5.	"Red on the Highway"	4:14
6.	"Holy Rider"	5:17
7.	"When the World Comes Down"	5:20
8.	"Vigilante"	6:40
9.	"Back Street Kid"	5:01

== Singles ==
Lonely Night 7" (July 1986)

1. "Lonely Night" [LP version] — 3:48
2. "Les Mort Dansant" [Live] — 5:30

Lonely Night 12" (July 1986)

1. "Lonely Night" [Extended version] — 5:05
2. "Les Mort Dansant" [Live] — 5:19
3. "Hold Back Your Love" [Live] — 5:00

Lonely Night Double 7" (July 1986)

1. "Lonely Night" [LP version] — 3:48
2. "Les Mort Dansant" [Live] — 5:30
3. "All England's Eyes" [Live] — 5:07
4. "Hit And Run" [Live] — 4:06

Midnight (You Won't Be Sleeping) 7" (October 1986)

1. "Midnight (You Won't Be Sleeping)" [edited remix] — 4:24
2. "Back Street Kid" [LP version] — 4:59

Midnight (You Won't Be Sleeping) 12" (October 1986)

1. "Midnight (You Won't Be Sleeping)" [Remix] — 0:00
2. "Back Street Kid" [LP version] — 5:01
3. "Midnight (You Won't Be Sleeping)" [LP version] — 4:01

Midnight (You Won't Be Sleeping) 12" picture disc (October 1986)

1. "Midnight (You Won't Be Sleeping)" [LP version] — 4:01
2. "Back Street Kid" [LP version] — 5:01
3. "Kingdom of Madness" [Live] — 0:00

When the World Comes Down 7" (February 1987)

1. "When the World Comes Down" [LP version] — 5:20
2. "Vigilante" [LP Version] — 6:40

When the World Comes Down 12" (February 1987)

1. "When the World Comes Down" [Extended] — 0:00
2. "Vigilante" [LP version] — 6:40

When the World Comes Down CD (July 1987)

1. "When the World Comes Down" [Extended] — 0:00
2. "Vigilante" [LP version] — 6:40

All live B-sides produced and engineered by Kit Woolven.

== Personnel ==
- Bob Catley – vocals
- Tony Clarkin – guitar
- Wally Lowe – bass
- Mark Stanway – keyboards
- Mickey Barker – drums

Additional musicians

- Roger Taylor – backing vocals on "When the World Comes Down" and "Sometime Love"
- Daniel Bourquin – saxophone on "Midnight (You Won't Be Sleeping)"

== Charts ==
Chart (1986)	Peak position
German Albums (Offizielle Top 100)	59
Swedish Albums (Sverigetopplistan)	16
UK Albums (OCC)	24
