= John Lewis (electronic musician) =

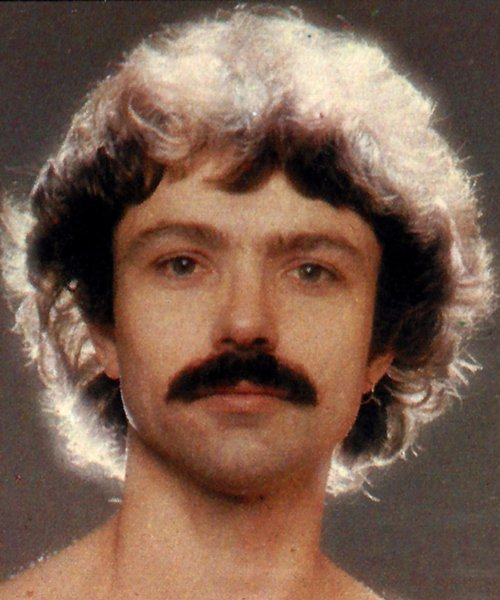
- Lewis in 1974

Background information
- Born: Reginald John Lewis; 26 July 1944; Davidson, Saskatchewan, Canada
- Died: 3 February 1985 (aged 40) Ham Green Hospital, Bristol, England
- Genres: Electronic; experimental
- Occupations: Composer; pianist
- Instruments: Piano; organ; synthesiser
- Years active: 1969 - 1984
- Label: Polydor

Reginald 'John' Lewis was a Canadian-born British electronic music and experimental composer and musician who worked on multiple projects during the 1970s and 1980s.

== Early life ==
Lewis was born in the town of Davidson, Saskatchewan, Canada, on 26 July 1944. He was the youngest of two boys, with his brother David five years his senior, born to parents David Reginald Lewis and Minnie Anne Bigg. Lewis studied for a bachelor in Fine Art - Music at St. Stephens College at the University of Alberta in the mid-1960s. During this time, Lewis became the prize composition student of associate professor Violet Archer, a renowned Canadian composer.

In 1964 Lewis was awarded the university 'Eva Shaw Memorial Prize in Music' for being a student of "outstanding merit". During his time at university, Lewis played the organ on the CKUA radio station in regular slots before becoming a music commentator for the station.

In November 1966 Lewis put forward an application that was endorsed by the university and put before the committee for one of the world's most prestigious scholarships - Rhodes. The scholarship was so prestigious that to be endorsed by the university an applicant was not only required to possess a bachelor's degree but also demonstrate “outstanding academic achievement”. John found himself competing with two of his peers: bachelor of commerce student Donald H. Clogg, and Kenneth C. McKenzie, who held an honours degree in geography. A committee of seven headed by Justice Kane, a former Rhodes scholar himself, and judge at the Alberta Supreme Court awarded the scholarship to Mr. McKenzie on 21 November 1966.

Having previously earned a Bachelor of Arts in English, Lewis then gained his Bachelor of Music, announced in the Edmonton Journal on 23 May 1967. He continued to broadcast on CKUA Radio as a Music Commentator in his regular slots and remained the music director at the Highlands United Church, a position he had held since 1966. He spent the academic year 1967-68 in Winnipeg studying organ and harpsichord with Douglas Bodle at the University of Manitoba, and composition with Bernard Naylor.

== British Commonwealth Scholarship (London) ==
Lewis's parents Reg and Minnie placed an announcement in their local newspaper, the Brooks Bulletin on 25 April 1968. In it, they congratulated him on winning a British Commonwealth Scholarship to “continue his music studies in London, England”. Before heading to London Lewis played in various concerts in association with the University of Alberta and an organ recital at St. Joseph's Cathedral on 1 August 1968. John is listed in the British Commonwealth Scholarship directory, and most likely arrived in London mid-to-late August 1968 to begin his scholarship in September of the same year.

Lewis took up his scholarship at the University of London under the guidance of musicologist Thurston Dart. He may have also studied at the South Kensington Institute. In the Daily Telegraph of 10 November 1969, he is credited with composing music for the performance of Alternations by New York dancer Gregg Mayher. Mayher was an ‘American Modern Dance’ teacher at South Kensington Institute [Imperial College] and the Dance Centre, which was located at 12 Floral Street, Covent Garden. John would return to composing for modern dance in a few years, when commissioned by Ballet Rambert.

== Rome 1970 - 1972 ==
After taking up his scholarship in London in 1968 Lewis then went to Rome, Italy to study "advanced music composition" under German Composer Hans Werner Henze.

== Ballet Rambert ==
By April 1973 Lewis was back in London having composed music for a ballet performance titled Red-shift, directed by dancer Carolyn Carlson. Lewis was also commissioned by Ballet Rambert in 1973 to write the score of Isolde, choreographed by Norman Morrice. The work had its premiere at Sadler's Wells Theatre on 27 September 1973. John also served as the Assistant Music Director when the company toured the United Kingdom. Isolde was widely reported and reviewed in the press before its last performance on 13 October 1973 at the Sunderland Empire. Lewis's original score, in his own hand is stored in the Rambert Archive.

Lewis remained with Ballet Rambert and was commissioned the following year to compose the score for Spindrift, again choreographed by Norman Morrice, which premiered at the Camden Roundhouse on 17 April 1974. John not only wrote the score, but he also toured with the company as Assistant Musical Director and pianist in performances up and down the UK. In the absence of Lewis, the accomplished Carlos Miranda occasionally assumed this role. Spindrift was last performed at the Theatre Y Werin on 3 May 1975. Sadly, the score is not held in the Rambert Archives.

== Electrophon Studio ==
In 1972 a 32-year-old Brian Hodgson of the BBC Radiophonic Workshop founded Electrophon Music Ltd after withdrawing his pension and leaving the BBC. In a corner of a warehouse full of industry creatives at 8-10 Neal's Yard, Covent Garden Hodgson was joined by Radiophonic colleague Delia Derbyshire, who soon after setting up the studio left London for the North of England.

Brian Hodgson, also commissioned by Ballet Rambert to compose music, had on occasion bumped into John Lewis at the Rambert rehearsal rooms and studio as well as at social events for industry creatives. Sometime in early 1974, Lewis, interested in buying a synthesizer, stopped by the Electrophon studio in the hope that Brian would guide him with his purchase. The pair took the short walk to Tottenham Court Road, stopping at music shops down the likes of Denmark Street - Britain's ‘Tin Pan Alley’, which by the 80s was littered with music shops, some still trading today. However, it was the lack of knowledge about synthesizers by the music shop owners that led Brian to suggest John partner with him at Electrophon.

Brian Hodgson and Lewis under the name "Wavemaker", released albums of melodic synthesizer music titled Where Are We Captain?... (1975) and New Atlantis (1977). In December 1977, Hodgson, upon invitation returned to the Radiophonic Workshop and left the Electrophon studio in Lewis's hands.

=== Notable works ===
- Lewis worked with British new wave band M on their 1979 hit song "Pop Muzik". Frontman Robin Scott stated "John Lewis's contribution from my point of view was unique. Unwittingly he was a musical catalyst to a classic recording in 1979". Although John was heavily influential in the composition of Pop Muzik, when the track was finished Robin Scott felt it was lacking that certain something that would set his record apart from all the others. Scott felt it needed an intro, and after various versions were composed he settled on Lewis's organ introduction. Lewis also appeared in television promotion of Pop Muzik, including two appearances on Top of the Pops in 1979 playing the organ and an appearance on German television show Plattenkuchen on 7 August 1979
- Lewis is credited on Pete Townshend's 1982 album ‘All the Best Cowboys Have Chinese Eyes’. as “Fairlight CMI Programming"
- Lewis is credited for composing 'Trouble with the Tune', lyrics also written by Ben Cross, for the Swingle Singers 1977 album titled Pieces of Eight. Lewis is also credited as playing the Keyboard on the CBS London recording of the track.
- On 1 January 1980 John is credited as producer, alongside Peter Kent on a version of T-Rex's ‘Children of the Revolution’ written by the late Marc Bolan, and recorded at Electrophon by the band ‘The Fast Set’. In the same year John worked with DJ Gareth Marshallsea. Calling themselves ‘C.V.O,’ they made a record called Sargaso Sea which was released on a compilation of demos by the same label as The Fast Set, 4AD.
- Lewis is credited in the 1982 documentary film on Gay life in London by Channel 4, 'One in Five' directed by Ken Howard and Paul Oremland, where John is cited in the rolling credits under music "ELECTROPHON - John Lewis".
- In 1984 John Lewis, Gareth Marshallsea and C. Platt wrote 'Thunder and Lightning' under the name Heat-X-Change. This was re-released multiple times over the years as remixes or on compilation albums. Having gained the status of an upbeat gay anthem, the track made it in recent years onto an album titled 'Heaven'-- a nod to London's gay nightclub Heaven--and a Stonewall Greatest Hits album,

== Dr Who (TV) ==
As Hodgson, and the entire Workshop, was heavily involved in creating Doctor Who sound effects and music, Hodgson was asked if he knew any outside composers. Hodgson suggested outsourcing some of the work to Lewis, who began recording the original incidental music for the serial The Mark of the Rani, broadcast in 1985. However, Lewis was already suffering from AIDS in an advanced stage, and managed to complete only the score for the first episode before becoming too ill to continue. He died soon afterwards, and a completely new score was created by Jonathan Gibbs. Lewis' score for the first episode was included on the DVD release.

== Sexuality ==
Lewis made no secret of his sexuality, but he was not known to make it obvious that he was a gay man. He always lived in and around the Kensington and Chelsea borough of London and rented a flat on Elsham Road, near Earls Court before purchasing the flat above the one he rented. He was a keen swimmer and regularly worked out at the fitness centres. He was handsome, well-groomed and in good shape.

Lewis was noted for wearing a bunch of keys on his belt loop, often used as a code along with the handkerchief to signify homosexual preference, and John is seen wearing his keys on his left hand side in an appearance on Top of the Pops for Pop Muzik.

== Death ==
One day in the Electrophon studio, Lewis shared his concern with Hodgson about a rash that had appeared on his arms from his wrists to his elbows. It later became known that this was a sign of seroconversion of HIV. Close friends of Lewis started to see, as he himself had noticed, that he was increasingly unable to fight off or was taking longer to fight off common infections such as cold and flu.

Around mid-1984 Lewis was admitted to London's Middlesex Hospital with what was diagnosed as a form of pneumonia. Additional tests after admission revealed an HIV/AIDS diagnosis. Hodgson and friends visited Lewis in hospital and upon his discharge all agreed to relocate the studio from Covent Garden to a small cottage in Bristol. While Lewis and his friends hoped for a treatment or cure, they felt the fresh country air would do him good. Hodgson recalled that naturally, electronic equipment gathers dust by static so they cleaned the studio equipment before sending it off to the cottage in Midford, Bristol.

Within a matter of weeks, Lewis fell ill and was admitted to the isolation hospital, Ham Green near Bristol. His father having died in 1976, his mother Minnie made the journey from Edmonton, Canada to be by her son's side. Lewis spent Christmas 1984 in a room on the isolation ward, known as T-Ward with two other men who were also suffering from AIDS and AIDS-related complications. The rooms were separated by a wall with a window.

John Lewis died on 3 February 1985 at Ham Green Hospital, near Bristol. His cause of death was (1a) a Pulmonary Embolism, (1b) Cryptococcal meningitis (an AIDS-related meningitis), and (2) HTLV-3 virus infection (now known as HIV/AIDS).

He was cremated at Haycombe Crematorium, Bath on 12 February 1985 in an intimate service and his ashes were interred in the garden of remembrance.

== UK AIDS Quilt ==
For World AIDS Day 2025, a panel measuring 3ft by 6ft was created in memory of John Lewis alongside seven other panels commemorating individuals lost to HIV/AIDS; including Leigh Bowery, and when stitched together the eight panels form a 12ft by 12ft quilt, which was formally presented to the UK AIDS Memorial Quilt.

John’s quilt is set on a navy cotton background split symbolically: the left bears half of the Canadian maple leaf in red, the right completes the motif with the other half rendered as the Union Jack, both trimmed with ruby red diamantés, marking his birth in Canada and his death in the United Kingdom. Centrally placed near the top is a portrait of John, flanked by red epaulets trimmed with gold fringe; his preferred name, John Lewis, glitters in gold diamantés, with his full name beneath in gold vinyl and in a stylish script his profession of ‘Composer’ immediately below. At the lower centre a retro fabric television is appliquéd, displaying a headshot still of John with Robin Scott on Top of the Pops, while a scatter of vinyl covers of his works sitting either side, memorialising his professional identity, sadly cut short by AIDS.
