= Pop Muzik =

Single by M

from the album New York • London • Paris • Munich
- B-side: "M Factor"
- Released: 16 March 1979
- Recorded: October 1978
- Studio: Mountain (Montreux, Switzerland)
- Genre: New wave; art pop; synth-pop; disco
- Length: 3:21 (single version); 4:57 (album version)
- Label: MCA; EMI; Sire
- Songwriter: Robin Scott
- Producer: Robin Scott

M singles chronology
"Moderne Man" (1979)	"Pop Muzik" (1979)	"Moonlight and Muzak" (1979)

Music video
- "Pop Muzik" on YouTube

"Pop Muzik" is a song by the English new wave and synth-pop music project M, from its debut studio album New York • London • Paris • Munich (1979). The song was accompanied by a well-received music video (directed by Brian Grant) showing lead vocalist Robin Scott as a disc jockey (DJ) behind an exaggerated turntable setup, at times flanked by two female models who sang and danced in a robotic manner. The video also featured Scott's then-partner Brigit Novik, who provided the backing vocals for the track.

"M Factor", the song's B-side, was featured in two different versions. The initial UK and European release featured the original cut of the song, but a slightly remixed version was released in the US and Canada. "Pop Muzik" reached number one on the US Billboard Hot 100, the Australian ARIA singles chart, and number two on the UK singles chart.

== Concept and chart performance ==
The song was initially recorded in R&B and funk styles before a friend of Scott suggested using synthesisers. He describes the genesis of "Pop Muzik":

I was looking to make a fusion of various styles which somehow would summarise the last 25 years of pop music. It was a deliberate point I was trying to make. Whereas rock and roll had created a generation gap, disco was bringing people together on an enormous scale. That's why I really wanted to make a simple, bland statement, which was, 'All we're talking about basically (is) pop music.'

Cash Box described it as a "quirky Euro-pop number," stating that "the nonsensical lyrics create a catchy cadence." Record World described it as a "totally infectious body-mover."

The single was released in the UK first, peaking at No. 2 on 12 May 1979, unable to break Art Garfunkel's six week stint at number one with "Bright Eyes". In August of that same year, it was released in North America, where it eventually climbed all the way to No. 1 in Canada on 27 October and in the US on 3 November.

Along with Scott, other musicians who played on the track were his brother Julian Scott (on bass guitar), then unknown keyboardist Wally Badarou, synthesiser programmer John Lewis, drummer Justin Hildreth, Gary Barnacle and Brigit Novik, the backing vocalist, credited as "Brigit Vinchon" on the records and sleeves.

The image of the baby on "Pop Muzik"'s single disc is of Robin Scott's daughter, Berenice. She became a singer, pianist, keyboardist, guitarist, and composer. She was involved in projects with her father's friends: Phil Gould, Wally Badarou, and Heaven 17.

== Album ==
The subsequent studio album New York • London • Paris • Munich was recorded in Montreux, Switzerland, at Queen's Mountain Studios, with lead vocalist and guitarist Robin Scott and regular engineer David Richards, as well as Julian Scott, Wally Badarou, and Brigit Novik.

Additional musicians on the album included drummer Phil Gould, Gary Barnacle on saxophone and flute, and David Bowie (a friend of Scott and a resident of Montreux at the time) who provided occasional handclaps.

The album was also released in the US by Sire Records with a different track listing.

== Other formats ==
The UK twelve-inch single version was notable for the A-side having a double groove so that the two tracks ("Pop Muzik" and "M Factor") both started at the outer edge of the record and finished in the middle (with a long silence at the end of "M Factor" since the track was the shorter of the two). This resulted in a random selection of the two tracks, depending on which groove the needle landed in the lead-in. To further market this idea, the UK record sleeve stated "B side included on A side, full length disco mix of Pop Musik on Seaside". 'Seaside' (in other words "C side") was a simple play on words as the letter C, apart from being the logical next "side" after the A and B sides, is pronounced the same way as the English word "sea".

The song was remixed and re-released in 1989 where it reached No. 15 on the UK singles chart.

== Chart performance ==
=== Weekly charts ===
Chart (1979–1980)	Peak position
Australia (Kent Music Report)	1
Austria (Ö3 Austria Top 40)	2
Belgium (Ultratop 50 Flanders)	3
Canada Adult Contemporary (RPM)	19
Canada Dance/Urban (RPM)	1
Canada Top Singles (RPM)	1
Denmark (IFPI)	1
Europe (Eurochart Hot 100)	1
France (IFOP)	12
Ireland (IRMA)	2
Netherlands (Dutch Top 40)	3
Netherlands (Single Top 100)	3
New Zealand (Recorded Music NZ)	3
Norway (VG-lista)	5
South Africa (Springbok Radio)	1
Sweden (Sverigetopplistan)	1
Switzerland (Schweizer Hitparade)	1
UK Singles (Official Charts)	2
US Billboard Hot 100	1
US Cash Box	4
US Radio & Records	3
US Record World	4
West Germany (GfK)	1

Chart (1989)	Peak position
UK Singles (OCC)	15

=== Year-end charts ===
Chart (1979)	Rank
Australia (Kent Music Report)	10
Austria (Ö3 Austria Top 40)	6
Belgium (Ultratop 50 Flanders)	28
Canada (RPM Top 200 Singles)	21
France (IFOP)	39
Germany (Official German Charts)	7
Netherlands (Dutch Top 40)	28
Netherlands (Single Top 100)	29
South Africa (Springbok Radio)	5
Switzerland (Schweizer Hitparade)	13
UK Singles (OCC)	12
US Cash Box	15

Chart (1980)	Rank
US Billboard Hot 100	40

=== Certifications and sales ===
Region	Certification	Certified units/sales
Germany (BVMI)	Gold	500,000^{^}
United Kingdom (BPI)	Silver	250,000^{^}
United States (RIAA)	Gold	1,000,000^{^}
^{^} Shipments figures based on certification alone.

== Formats and track listings ==
=== Original 7" single ===
Original 7" single released by MCA Records and EMI in Europe.

1. "Pop Muzik" – 3:21
2. "M Factor" – 2:30

=== Original 7" single with prize message ===
Original 7" single released by MCA Records and EMI in Europe; had a special 'prize message' at the end of the A-side which said "It's a winner!". Presenting the record at the retailer entitled you to a small cash prize/free gift.

1. "Pop Muzik" – 3:29
2. "M Factor" – 2:30

=== Long version single ===
Released in both 7" and 12" vinyl single formats in the United States by Sire Records, and as a 12" vinyl single in France by Pathé Marconi EMI, all featuring a longer version of the song.

1. "Pop Muzik" (long version) – 4:58
2. "M Factor" – 2:30

=== Netherlands 12" single ===
12" single released in the Netherlands by MCA Records. The B-side "M Factor" was featured on the A-side of the record on this release, with a remix of the title song on the B-side.

1. "Pop Muzik"
2. "M Factor"
3. "Pop Muzik" (long version)

=== Sweden 7" 1989 release ===
7" single released in Sweden in 1989 by Freestyle Records.

1. "Pop Muzik" (edited 1989 remix) – 3:10
2. "Pop Muzik" (original 7" version) – 3:20

=== Sweden 12" 1989 release ===
12" single released in Sweden in 1989 by Freestyle Records.

1. "Pop Muzik" (extended 1989 hip-hop remix) – 5:40
2. "Pop Muzik" (7" version) – 3:20
3. "Pop Muzik" (edited 1989 dub remix) – 3:20
4. "Pop Muzik" (original 12" version) – 5:00
5. "Pop Muzik" (edited 1989 remix) – 3:10

=== Germany 12" 1989 release ===
12" single released in Germany in 1989 by ZYX Records.

1. "Pop Muzik" (the hip-hop club remix) – 5:38
2. "Pop Muzik" (the hip-hop remix) – 3:20
3. "Pop Muzik" (original '79 mix) – 3:21

=== Germany CD 2001 release ===
CD single released in Germany in 2001 by ZYX Records.

1. "Pop Muzik" (Britannia '89 remix) – 3:11
2. "Pop Muzik" (Cabinet remix) – 7:38
3. "Pop Muzik" (original version) – 3:21

== Cover versions ==
- Male vocal and instrumental band All Systems Go entered the UK singles chart on 18 June 1988. It reached No. 63, and remained in the chart for two weeks.
- In 1997, the Irish rock band U2 remixed the song to use as the opening track for their PopMart Tour. The remix has an upbeat tempo and use of synthesizers. In the live version, Robin Scott's vocals were used. The song was released on the "Last Night on Earth" single and Bono's vocals replaced Scott's. The only part of the song Bono added was the line "dance to the PopMart, top of the food chain." Andrew Unterberger of Stylus Magazine said the cover was "hardly the most musically accomplished thing U2 did in this period, but I can't think of a better choice to introduce this period of their career." It is also a featured track on PopMart: Live from Mexico City.
- In 2000, a music promoter turned recording artist by the name of Marcus was signed by Clive Davis to J Records. The following year he released a cover version with a slightly different spelling: "Pop Musik." The chorus hook from the original song was used ("pop, pop, pop music"), but the lyrics were changed to talk about top pop artists of the day like Britney Spears, Backstreet Boys, Will Smith, NSYNC, and even Marilyn Manson. The song was produced by P.M. Dawn and was released as a CD single in spring of 2001. The song was included on a BMG compilation CD, Cool Traxx! 3, which also featured hit songs from many of the artists that Marcus sings about in his remake. Billboard said of the song, "This is G-rated fun that could connect with the younger side of the top 40 demographic, and it could charm the ears of programmers looking for an instant reaction record— but, boy, does its novelty affect wear thin after only a few listens…"
- In 2010, British alternative rock group We've Got a Fuzzbox and We're Gonna Use It released a cover through Gotham Records.

== See also ==
- List of Billboard Hot 100 number ones of 1979
- List of European number-one hits of 1979
- List of number-one singles in Australia during the 1970s
- List of number-one singles of 1979 (Canada)
- List of number-one hits of 1979 (Germany)
- List of number-one singles and albums in Sweden
- List of number-one singles from 1968 to 1979 (Switzerland)
- List of RPM number-one dance singles of 1979
