= Robin Scott (singer) =

English singer (born 1947)

- Also known as: Comic Romance
- Born: Robin Edmond Scott; 1 April 1947 (age 79); Croydon, Surrey, England
- Education: Croydon Art College
- Genres: New wave; synth-pop; worldbeat; folk
- Occupations: Singer; songwriter; musician; songwriter; record producer
- Instruments: Vocals; guitar; keyboards
- Years active: 1968–present
- Labels: Head; Green Light; Sire; CBS; Alfa; Ricordi International; Albion; 10; Westside; The White Label; Yup!; Victor; Sunbeam; Union Square Music; Metro; BMG
- Member of: M
- Spouses: Brigitte Vinchon; Helen Scott
- Website: robinscott.uk

Robin Edmond Scott (born 1 April 1947) is an English singer, songwriter, musician, and record producer. He came to prominence in the late 1970s as the founder and sole member of the new wave and synth-pop music project M, who had a transatlantic hit with "Pop Muzik" in 1979. His career encompasses six decades.

== Early life ==
Robin Edmond Scott was born on 1 April 1947 in Croydon, Surrey, where he attended Croydon Art College and met future fashion designer, entrepreneur and music manager Malcolm McLaren in the late 1960s. Scott befriended McLaren and fashion designer and businesswoman Vivienne Westwood with whom he was to collaborate ten years later. He declined their offer to be involved in SEX, the Chelsea, London boutique which McLaren and Westwood launched, preferring to make his career in music.

== Career ==
=== Early career ===
While at college he had displayed a talent for writing topical songs which he performed on radio and television. This led to his debut studio album, for which he was backed by the psychedelic rock band Mighty Baby. Woman from the Warm Grass was released on a small independent record label called Head Records.

Scott began performing his own songs and accompanying himself on guitar. He spent a period playing folk music clubs as a solo musician, sharing bills with emerging artists such as David Bowie, John Martyn and Ralph McTell. He also recorded a session for the BBC, one of the tracks from which was included on the CD reissue of the album in 2001.

In early 1970, Scott conceived a multimedia project, The Voice, which was aired on BBC Radio 3. He left Britain to travel both around Europe and North America. When he returned, he made demos with members of the progressive rock band Camel, songwriter Terry Britten and music publisher Ronnie Scott. In 1972, he won the Search for a Star national talent contest, and was offered a recording contract by EMI Records, but turned down the deal because the label would not support his backing band.

In 1973, he performed in bands with drummer Pete Thomas (later of Elvis Costello and the Attractions), and bassist Paul Riley, and also wrote a musical called Heartaches & Teardrops, a play with original songs which has parallels to The Rocky Horror Show, and the True Love and Romance comic strip genre.

Scott then started working with Roogalator, a well regarded and original pub rock band. He produced their debut single, "Cincinnati Fatback" (one of the first releases on Stiff Records) followed by "Love & the Single Girl" on Virgin. Virgin failed to pick up option to release the band's first album so Scott produced Roogalator's debut studio album Play It by Ear for release on Do It Records which he co-founded in 1978 with Max and Ian Tregoning. Scott also recorded "Cry Myself to Sleep" under the alias of Comic Romance, for release on Do It.

In 1978, Scott worked as a record producer for the label Barclay in Paris, France where he lived with his girlfriend Brigitte Vinchon (alias Brigit Novik), after producing and filming with the director Julien Temple and all-female punk rock quartet the Slits. In November 1979 Do It released the debut studio album by Adam and the Ants, Dirk Wears White Sox.

=== Breakthrough ===
While still in Paris he recorded early versions of "Moderne Man" and "Satisfy Your Lust", tracks which would ultimately appear on the debut M studio album.

Using a group of session musicians he called "M", he also produced and recorded "Pop Muzik". It became a Top 10 hit in the UK and popular again in 1989 when it was remixed and re-released. Among the other musicians who played on the track were his brother Julian Scott (on bass guitar), then-unknown keyboardist Wally Badarou, programmer John Lewis and backing vocalist Brigit Novik. When it was released in the UK in March 1979, it became a hit, reaching No. 2 on the UK singles chart and No. 1 in the US Billboard Hot 100, after which MCA Records, the label which had released the single, requested he record a studio album.

New York • London • Paris • Munich was recorded in Montreux, Switzerland, at Queen's Mountain Studios, and using their regular engineer, David Richards as well as Julian Scott, Wally Badarou (who would later work with Steve Winwood, among others) and Brigit Novik. Additional musicians on the album included drummer Phil Gould (later of Re-Flex and Level 42), Gary Barnacle on saxophone and flute, and Montreux resident David Bowie, who provided occasional handclaps. Released in the UK at the end of 1979 and on Sire Records in the US, the album sold moderately well.

"Moonlight and Muzak" was released in late 1979 as the third single from the album, peaking at No. 33 in the UK. MCA executives were unhappy with this change of direction, but with a hit behind him, Scott felt it was relevant to be heard at this point. The track was written as a result of his experiences in the US where he came into contact with a brand and company called Muzak.

The song was a UK Top 40 hit, and then "That's the Way the Money Goes" became another charting hit inside of a year. A 45-minute film incorporating music videos and concert performances to date came as a result of a quick globe-trotting world tour in the wake of the hit.

=== Other M releases ===
In late 1980, the follow-up studio album called The Official Secrets Act was released, containing the songs "Keep It to Yourself" and the title-track, and was inspired, albeit tongue-in-cheek, by the overwhelming worldwide paranoia of the time. It was recorded in the UK and Dublin, Ireland, with contributions from Bill Whelan (the man behind Riverdance, who at the time worked as an arranger). Among the musicians on the album were Phil Gould on drums again, who also introduced his friend and subsequent Level 42 colleague Mark King. King at the time played guitar as much as bass; these recordings took place prior to his discovery of his trademark sound. In 1981, Scott co-produced rising star Ryuichi Sakamoto, along with Yukihiro Takahashi and Haruomi Hosono of Yellow Magic Orchestra (YMO), (who also played on the albums Left Handed Dream (1981) and The Arrangement: 1980–1982 Singles & Rarities), as did guitarist, Adrian Belew (known for his work with King Crimson, Frank Zappa, David Bowie, Talking Heads, Laurie Anderson, and Nine Inch Nails), while Scott and Brigit Novik supplied vocals and co-wrote four tracks.

In April 1982, a third M studio album, Famous Last Words, was released. It featured many of the musicians from the previous studio albums, including the early incarnation of Level 42 (who by this time were having their own regular hits), Wally Badarou on keyboards, Julian Scott on bass guitar, Brigit Novik on lead and backing vocals, a young Thomas Dolby on synthesizers and sequencing, Yellow Magic Orchestra drummer Yukihiro Takahashi, Gang of Four guitarist Andy Gill and Tony Levin on bass guitar. MCA declined release of the album in the UK, and it was only released in France, Italy and the US (Warner-Sire Records).

In mid-1982, MCA and M parted company. At this point some role reversing took place and Scott produced the M single "Danube" for the Stiff label, featuring Brigit Novik on vocals, followed by "The Wedding Dance" presenting Novik as an artist in her own right.

=== African phase ===
As a development of the ethnic references on The Official Secrets Act and the Stiff releases, Scott found a new musical direction, producing an extended play (EP) of African acts in Kenya. This led to the studio album Jive Shikisha! (credited to Robin Scott and Shikisha), recorded in Kenya and the UK between 1983 and 1984, with musicians from several different African states. The album featured a female vocal trio from South Africa, Shikisha (hence the album title), Wally Badarou and Julian Scott.

Most of this world music was originally suppressed, but was remastered and released in 2003. The resurgence of interest in Scott and the history of "Pop Muzik" follows the Irish rock band U2's use of the Steve Osborne remix opening their PopMart Tour (1997–1998). Remixes have come from all sides, from Marcus' "Pop Muzic 2001" in 2002, and by Junior Vasquez and the Dub Pistols in 2003.

In 2003 a collection of Scott's artwork was shown at the Ensign Gallery in London. and a compilation album including both retrospective studio recording and period demos was released with title of Life Class featuring artwork from the exhibition.

Scott appeared in the Countdown Spectacular two-concert series in Australia between late August and early September 2007, where he performed "Pop Muzik" live for the first time. In 2009, an album featuring the original 1979 mix and thirteen remixes of "Pop Muzik" was issued by Union Square.

=== Recent work ===
In August 2017, Scott released the studio album Emotional DNA in the digital download format. On 5 July 2023, Scott released the first new single by M in 41 years, a track called "Break the Silence". and, also under the *M*/Robin Scott moniker, released The FAQs of Life on 11 July 2025 through BMG. In June 2026 two remixed/re-recorded versions of The Official Secrets Act (Amplified and Classified) were released through license with BMG.

== Discography ==
- Woman from the Warm Grass (1969), Head
- New York • London • Paris • Munich (1979), Sire
- The Official Secrets Act (1980), Sire
- Famous Last Words (1982), Sire
- High Life Music EP (1983), Swahili/Albion
- Life Class (2003), Yup!
- Pop Muzik – The Remix Album (2010), Union Square
- Emotional DNA (2017), self-released
- The FAQs of Life (2025), BMG
- The Official Secrets Act – Amplified (2026), BMG (Under License)
- The Official Secrets Act – Classified (2026), BMG (Under License)

=== Collaborations ===
- Left Handed Dream (1981), Epic – Ryuichi Sakamoto featuring Robin Scott
- The Arrangement (1982), Alfa – Ryuichi Sakamoto featuring Robin Scott
- Jive Shikisha! † (1998) Recorded in 1984 – Robin Scott and Shikisha
