= M (band) =

British new wave and synth-pop group

- Origin: London, England
- Genres: New wave; synth-pop
- Years active: 1978–1984; 2023–present
- Labels: Stiff; MCA; Sire; Warner Bros.; Yup!; BMG
- Members: Robin Scott

M is an English new wave and synth-pop music project, formed in London in 1978, by Robin Scott. M is best known for its song "Pop Muzik", which reached No. 2 on the UK singles chart in May 1979, and No. 1 on the US Billboard Hot 100 on 3 November 1979. Three other songs also made the UK Top 100, "Moonlight and Muzak" (No. 33), "That's the Way the Money Goes" (No. 45), and "Official Secrets" (No. 64), but beyond a remix of "Pop Muzik" in 1989, they would never make the Top 20 again.

Its debut and only charting studio album New York–London–Paris–Munich was released in November 1979, following the success of "Pop Muzik". This was followed by The Official Secrets Act (1980), and Famous Last Words (1982). In 2023, the project reformed and its fourth studio album, The FAQs of Life, was released in 2025.

Musicians who contributed to M at one time or another have included Mark King, and Phil Gould of Level 42, David Bowie, Thomas Dolby, Tony Levin, Wally Badarou, Andy Gill of Gang of Four, Yukihiro Takahashi of Yellow Magic Orchestra (YMO), and Gary Barnacle.

== Band history ==
Robin Scott first used the pseudonym M in 1978, when he released the single "Moderne Man". His next single, "Pop Muzik", featured Scott's brother Julian on bass guitar, his wife Brigit Novik on backing vocals, and Wally Badarou on keyboards. The album New York–London–Paris–Munich was released in November 1979.

M had three other singles that charted on the UK singles chart, "Moonlight and Muzak" (No. 33 in December 1979), "That's the Way the Money Goes" (No. 45 in March 1980) and "Official Secrets" (No. 64 in November 1980). M has released five studio albums throughout their career so far: New York • London • Paris • Munich in 1979, The Official Secrets Act in 1980, and Famous Last Words, mostly recorded in 1982, but not released in the UK until 2000. A fourth studio album, Jive Shikisha! was recorded in 1984 but was not released until 1998.

M's first single, "Moderne Man", was later re-recorded and remixed with "Satisfy Your Lust", the B-side of "That's the Way the Money Goes", for inclusion as a medley on M's studio album New York • London • Paris • Munich. The original single releases appeared on the 1997 CD re-release. A remixed version of "Pop Muzik" was played before each concert of U2's PopMart Tour.

On 23 June 2023, Scott released "Break the Silence", the first new single by M in 43 years. Scott's fifth studio album as M, The FAQs of Life, was released on 11 July 2025, accompanied by the single "AI?". It marks M's first new album of original material in over 40 years.

== Band members ==
=== Founding member ===
- Robin Scott – vocals, guitar, synthesizer, piano, keyboards

=== Session contributors and credits ===
- Brigit Novik Vinchon – vocals (1978–1982)
- Wally Badarou – keyboards, synthesizers, sequencer (1978–1984)
- Julian Scott – bass guitar (1978–1982)
- Philip Gould – drums, percussion (1978–1980)
- Gary Barnacle – saxophone, flute (1978–1982)
- David Bowie – handclaps (1978)
- David Vorhaus – synthesizer (1980)
- Mark King – guitar, drums, bass guitar (1980–1982)
- Paddy Keenan – uilleann pipes (1980)
- Marlisse & Steve – backing vocals (1982)
- Mary Bird – backing vocals (1982)
- Andy Gill – guitar (1982)
- Gordon Huntley – guitar (1982)
- Jamie West – guitar (1982)
- Nick Plytas – organ, Moog synthesizer bass, piano, backing vocals (1982)
- Barry Adamson – bass guitar (1982)
- Tony Levin – bass guitar (1982)
- Andy Anderson – drums (1982)
- Sergio Castillo – drums (1982)
- Yukihiro Takahashi – drums (1982)
- John Lewis – synthesizer, sequencer (1982)
- Thomas Dolby – synthesizer, sequencer (1982)
- Sammy Smile – bass guitar (1984)
- Columbo Lamu – brass (1984)
- Tabu Frantal – guitar (1984)
- Mose Se Sengo – guitar (1984)
- Shikisha – vocals (1984)
  - Betty Boo Hlela
  - Doreen Webster
  - Julia Muntu Mathunjwa

== Discography ==
=== Albums ===
==== Studio albums ====
Title	Year	Peak chart positions	
Title	Year	AUS	US
New York–London–Paris–Munich	1979	97	79
The Official Secrets Act	1980	—	—
Famous Last Words (Note: Recorded in 1982 and released in the UK in 1998)	1982	—	—
Jive Shikisha! (Note: Recorded in 1984 and not released until 1998, credited to Robin Scott and Shikisha)	1998	—	—
The FAQs of Life	2025	—	—
	"—" denotes an album that did not chart or was not released in that territory.		

==== Compilation albums ====
- Pop Muzik – The Very Best of M (1996, Music Collection International)
- Pop Muzik (1997, Collectables Records) Reissue of the US version of New York–London–Paris–Munich.
- 'M' The History – Pop Muzik The 25th Anniversary (2004, Union Square Music)
- Pop Muzik – 30th Anniversary Remixes (2009, Echo Beach) Remix album featuring 13 remixes of "Pop Muzik".

=== Singles ===
Title	Year	Peak chart positions				Certifications
Title	Year	UK	AUS	US Hot 100	US Dance	Certifications
"Moderne Man"	1978	—	—	—	38	
"Pop Muzik"	1979	2	1	1	4	Germany (BVMI): Gold; United Kingdom (BPI): Silver; United States (RIAA): Gold
"Moonlight and Muzak"	1979	33	37	—	38	
"That's the Way the Money Goes"	1980	45	—	—	38	
"Official Secrets"	1980	64	—	—	—	
"Keep It to Yourself"	1981	—	—	—	—	
"Danube"	1982	—	—	—	—	
"Eureka" (Note: Billed as Robin Scott)	1983	—	—	—	—	
"Crazy Zulu"	1984	—	—	—	—	
"Pop Muzik" (remix)	1989	15	—	—	—	
"Break the Silence"	2023	–	—	—	—	
"AI?"	2025	–	—	—	—	
"—" denotes a recording that did not chart or was not released in that territory.
