= Hoppy Kamiyama =

Japanese keyboardist and music producer (born 1960)

Hoppy Kamiyama (ホッピー 神山, Hoppī Kamiyama, born 1960) is a Japanese keyboardist and music producer who has worked with artists such as eX-Girl, The Pugs, Bradford Reed, Bill Laswell, Jan Linton, Marc Ribot, Hugh Hopper/Elton Dean and Damo Suzuki.

== Biography ==
His record company, God Mountain, was named after the English translation of his family name. God Mountain was established in 1993 after his frustration with EMI pulling two of his albums from sale.

Kamiyama cites Mauricio Kagel, Luciano Berio, Iannis Xenakis and Karlheinz Stockhausen as his influences – artists with a "bizarre sense and distorted feel and touch".

His nickname is derived from Hoppy, a cheap Japanese liquor that he drank during his early professional musician days.
