= Mountain Studios =

Recording studio in Montreux, Switzerland

Coordinates: 46.5159°N 6.8488°E

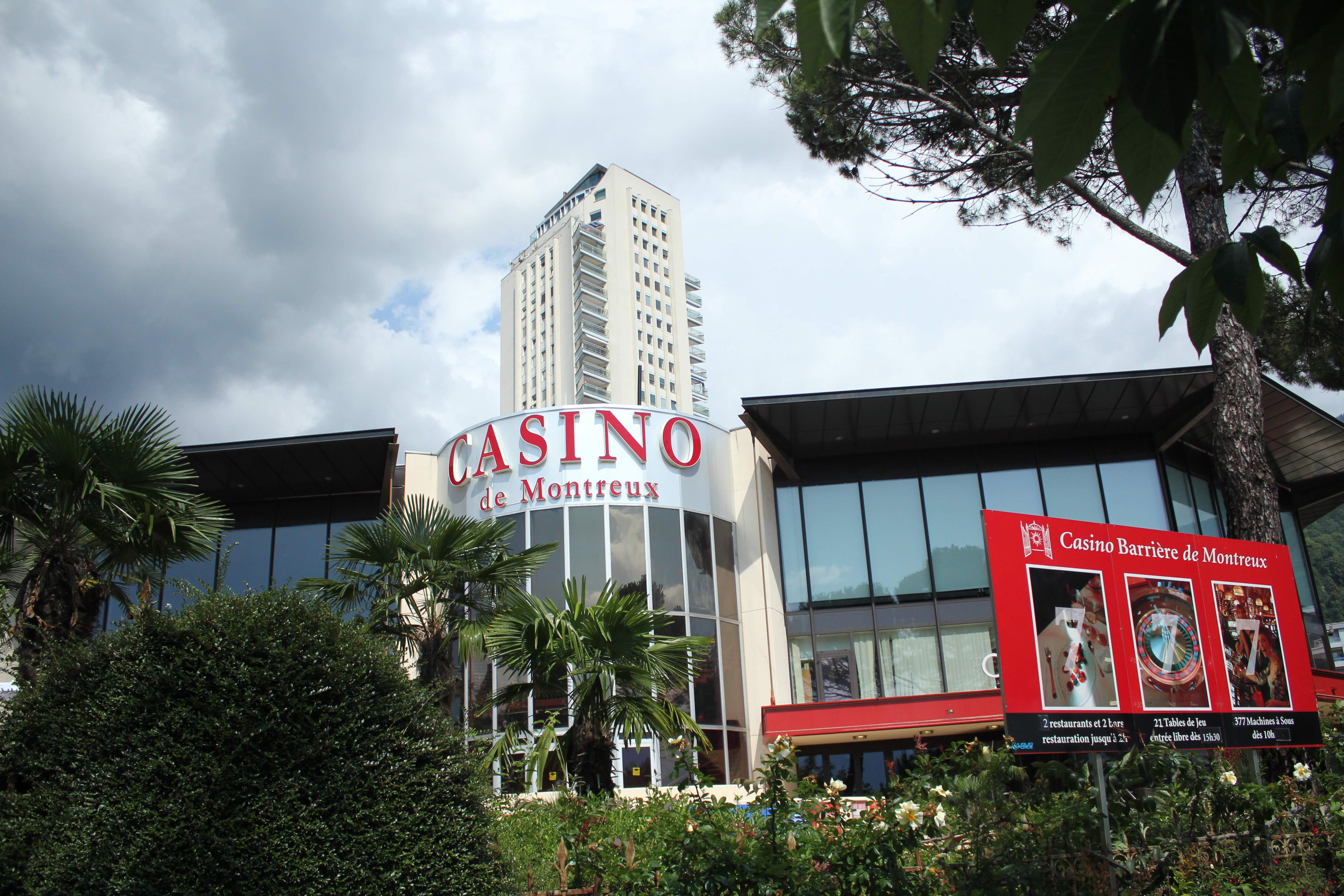
2014 Outside of Casino

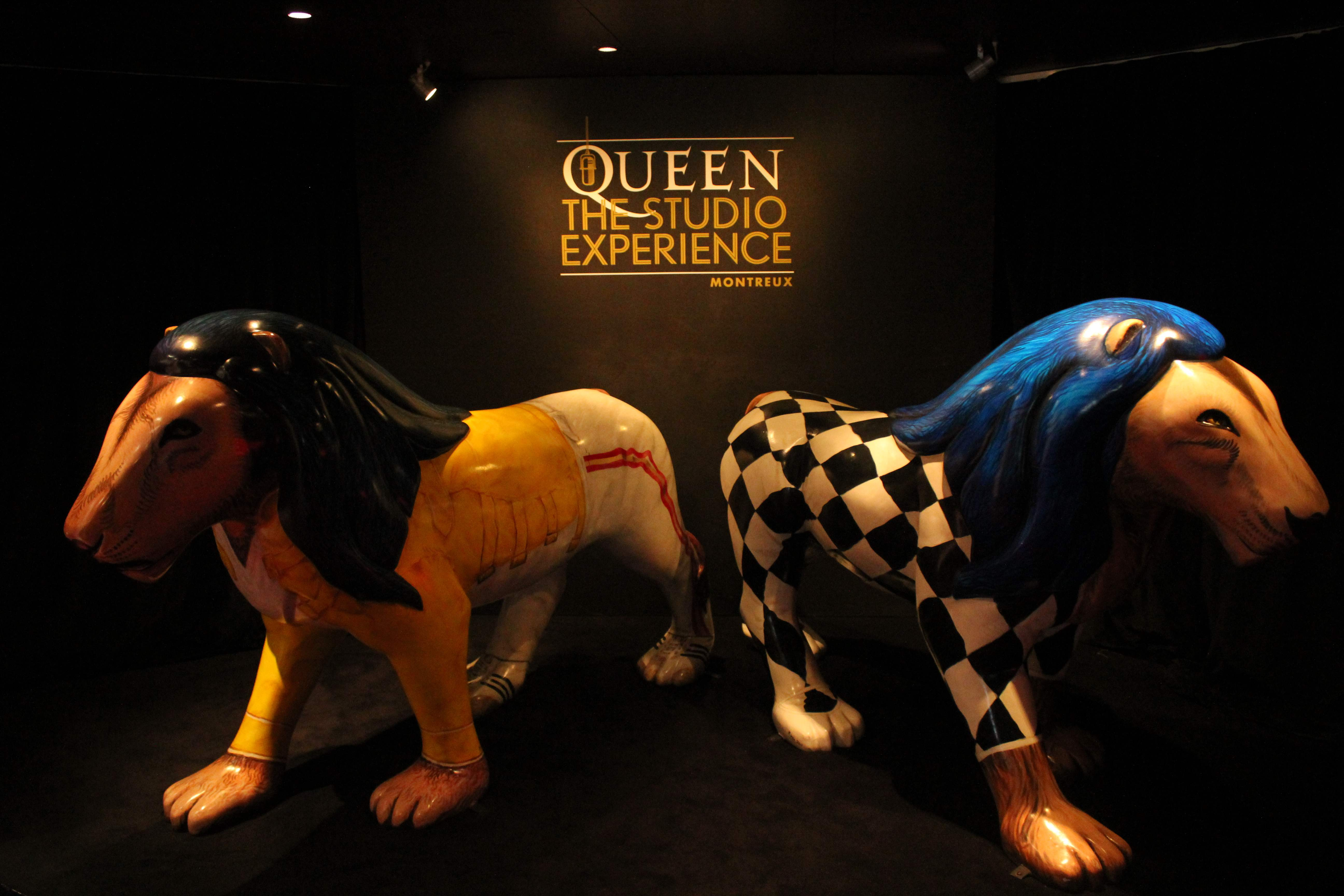
2014 Entrance of Queen Studio Experience

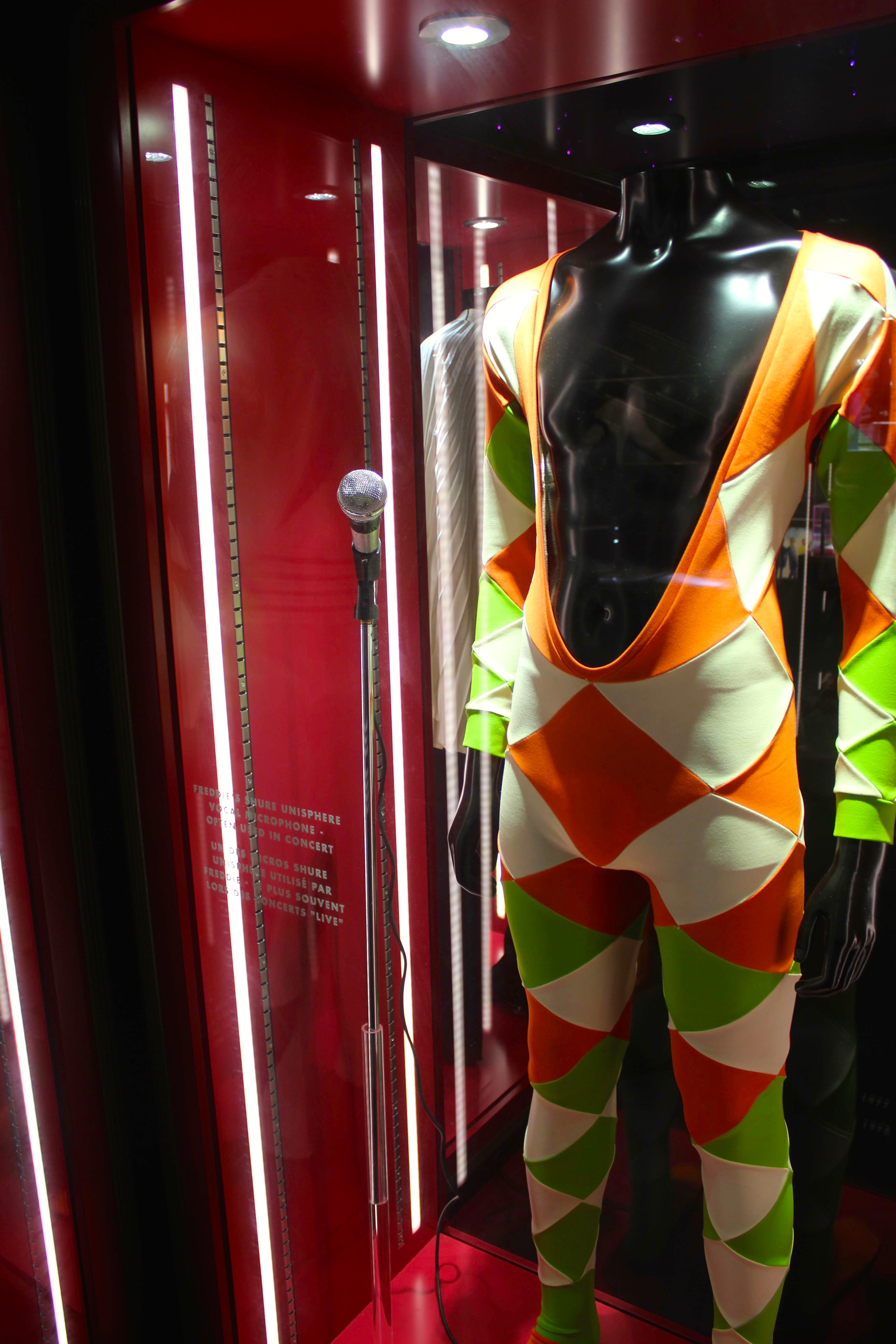
2014 Queen Studio Experience

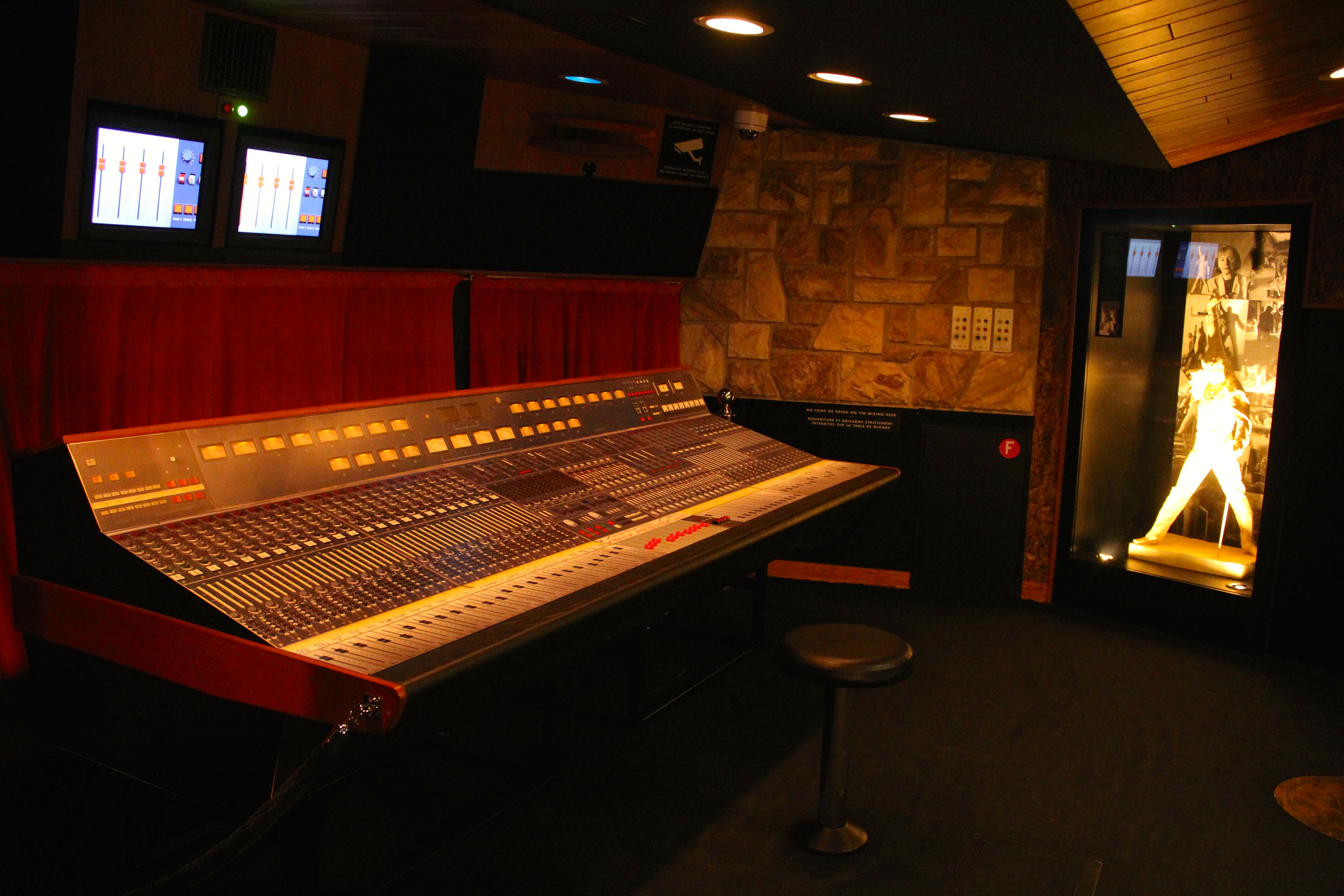
2014 Queen Studio Experience

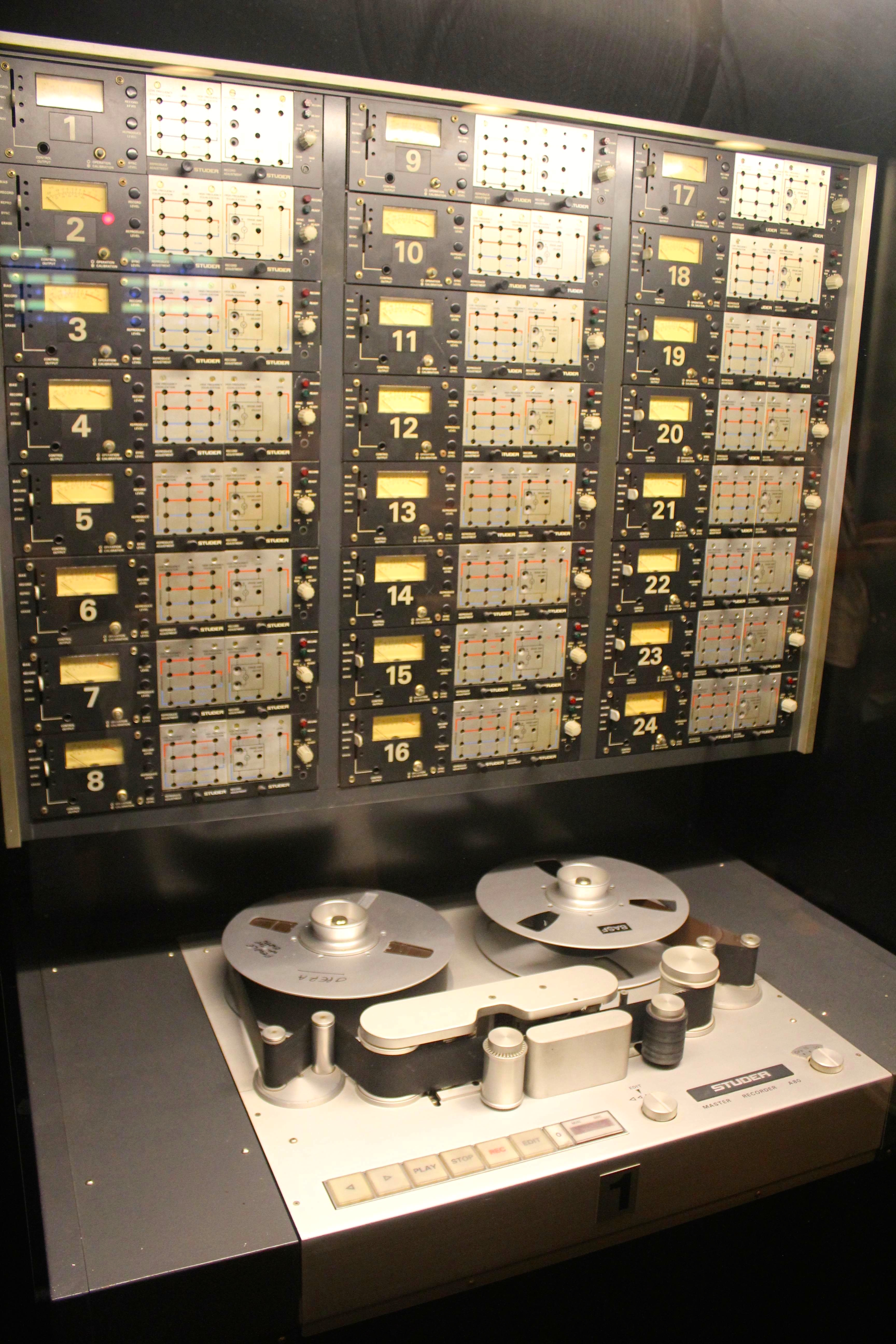
Studer A80 24-track tape recorder

Mountain Studios was a commercial recording studio founded by American singer and composer Anita Kerr and her husband Alex Grob in 1975 within the Montreux Casino in Montreux. The studio was under the ownership of Queen and then long-time Queen producer David Richards from 1979 until 2013, after which it became the charity museum/exhibition Queen: The Studio Experience, benefitting the Mercury Phoenix Trust.

== Background ==
Singer and composer Anita Kerr and her husband, Swiss businessman Alex Grob, hired Westlake Audio and studio designer Tom Hidley to build the studio in the Montreux Casino, where it recorded all live performances of the Montreux Jazz Festival. Additionally, the tax advantages of the studio's location in Switzerland proved popular, with British artists such as David Bowie, the Rolling Stones, Yes, Rick Wakeman, Emerson, Lake & Palmer, and Queen recording at Mountain Studios over the first few years.

In 1979, Queen acquired the studio from Kerr and Grob, and subsequently utilized the studio for several subsequent Queen albums, as well as solo projects from band members Freddie Mercury, Brian May, and Roger Taylor.

In 1993, the long-time Queen producer David Richards bought the studio. Upon Richards' death in 2013, the location of the former studio became the charity museum/exhibition Queen: The Studio Experience, with the Mercury Phoenix Trust being the beneficiary.

== Albums recorded at Mountain Studios ==
- Samael
  - Eternal (1999)
- Queen
  - Jazz (1978)
  - Hot Space (1982)
  - A Kind of Magic (1986)
  - The Miracle (1989)
  - Innuendo (1991)
  - Made in Heaven (1995)
- Brian May
  - Back to the Light (1992)
- Freddie Mercury & Montserrat Caballé
  - Barcelona (1988)
- Roger Taylor
  - Fun in Space (1981)
  - Strange Frontier (1984)
- The Cross
  - Shove It (1988)
  - Mad, Bad and Dangerous to Know (1990)
- AC/DC
  - Fly on the Wall (1985)
- David Bowie
  - Lodger (1979)
  - Never Let Me Down (1987)
  - Black Tie White Noise (1993)
  - The Buddha of Suburbia (1993)
  - Outside (1995)
  - Reality (2003)
- Iggy Pop
  - Blah Blah Blah (1986)
- Chris Rea
  - Water Sign (1983)
  - Wired to the Moon (1984)
  - Shamrock Diaries (1985)
  - On the Beach (1986)
- The Rolling Stones
  - Black and Blue (1976)
- Yes
  - Going for the One (1977)
- Rick Wakeman
  - Rick Wakeman's Criminal Record (1977)
- Magnum
  - Vigilante (1986)
- Smokie
  - The Montreux Album (1978)
- Status Quo
  - 1+9+8+2 (1982)
- Emerson, Lake & Palmer
  - Works Volume 1 (1977)
- Bluvertigo
  - Zero - ovvero la famosa nevicata dell'85 (1999)
- Christine McVie
  - Christine McVie (1984)

== See also ==
- David Richards
