= Past Lives – The Best of the RCA Years =

Greatest hits album by Level 42
- Released: 9 July 2007
- Genre: Rock; pop; pop rock; jazz
- Label: Sony/BMG/Camden
- Producer: Wally Badarou; Level 42; Mark King

Level 42 chronology
| Retroglide (2006) | Past Lives – The Best of the RCA Years (2007) |

Professional ratings
Review scores
| Source | Rating |
|---|---|
| AllMusic | 3/5 stars |

Past Lives – The Best of the RCA Years is a compilation released in 2007 by English jazz-funk band Level 42. The compilation has the greatest songs of the period 1991–1996, in which the band was with the label RCA/BMG. All songs were released on the studio albums Guaranteed (1991) and Forever Now (1994).

== Track listing ==
1. "Past Lives" (1994) (King, P. Gould) – 5:39
2. "Guaranteed" (1991) (Lindup, Husband, King, Badarou) – 4:51
3. "Overtime" (1991) (Lindup, King, Barfield) – 4:47
4. "My Father's Shoes" (1991) (Lindup, King, Green, Badarou) – 5:14
5. "Forever Now" (1994) (Musker, Darbyshire, King) – 4:14
6. "All Over You" (1994) (King, Lindup, Gould) – 4:02
7. "Love in a Peaceful World" (1994) (Gould, White) – 7:13
8. "Model Friend" (1994) (King, Lindup, Gould) – 4:56
9. "Romance" (1994) (King, Lindup, Gould) – 4:55
10. "One in a Million" (1994) (Lindup, Gould, Badarou, King) – 4:56
11. "Don't Bother Me" (1994) (King, Gould) – 4:57
12. "Seven Years" (1991) (King) – 4:42
13. "Lasso the Moon" (1991) (Lindup, Green) – 4:02
14. "Set Me Up" (1991) (Lindup, King, Barfield) – 4:28
15. "If You Were Mine" (1991) (Husband) – 5:01

== Personnel ==
- Mark King – vocals, bass guitar
- Mike Lindup – keyboards, vocals
- Gary Husband – drums (tracks 2–4, 12–15)
- Phil Gould – drums (tracks 1, 5–11)
- Allan Holdsworth – guitars (tracks 2–4, 12–15)
- Dominic Miller – guitars (tracks 2–4, 12–15)
- Danny Blume – guitars (tracks 1, 5–11)
- Wally Badarou – keyboards
