= List of Level 42 members =

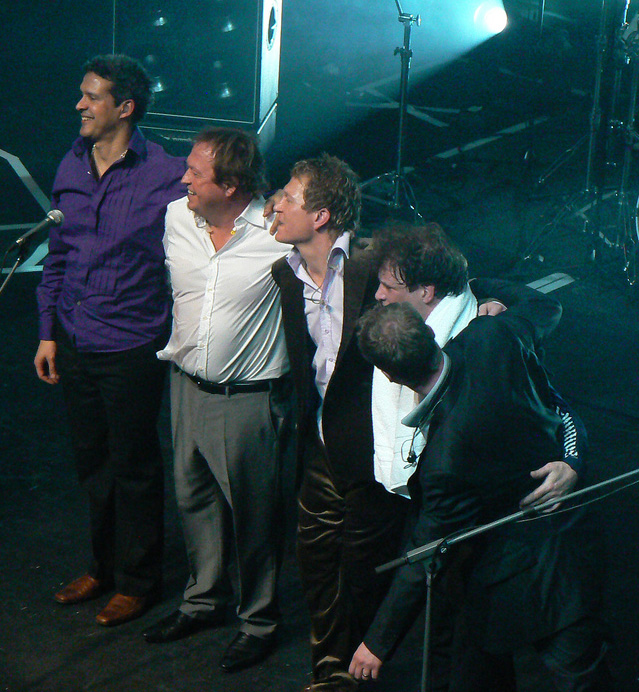
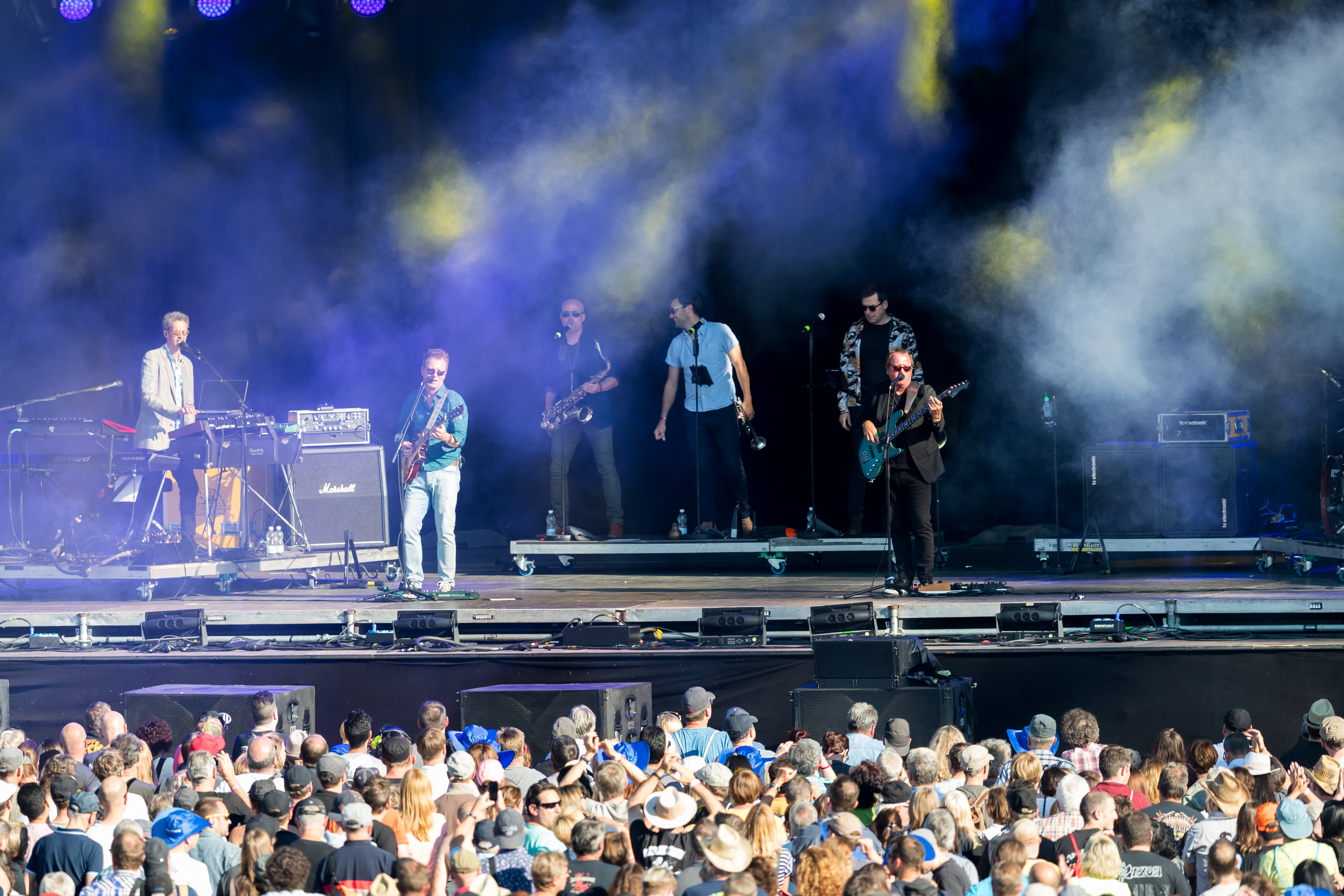
Members of Level 42 onstage in 2009 (top) and 2018 (bottom).

Level 42 are an English jazz-funk band from the Isle of Wight. Formed in late 1979, the group were originally an instrumental outfit consisting of bassist Mark King, keyboardist Mike Lindup, guitarist Rowland "Boon" Gould and drummer Phil Gould. Shortly after their formation, the band were encouraged to add vocals to their music, with both King and Lindup taking on lead vocalist duties. The group's lineup remained constant throughout much of the 1980s, before the Gould brothers left in October 1987. After suffering exhaustion on tour, Boon and Phil were replaced for shows at the end of the year by Paul Gendler and Neil Conti, respectively. Early the next year, King and Lindup enlisted Steve Topping, soon replaced by Alan Murphy, and Gary Husband as their new permanent bandmates, after deciding against continuing with supporting musicians.

Topping left Level 42 due to musical differences after tour dates in early 1988. He was replaced later by Alan Murphy, who debuted on Staring at the Sun later in the year. On 19 October 1989, however, Murphy died of pneumonia resulting from AIDS. The group took a year off before returning to record Guaranteed, on which the three official members worked with guitarists Allan Holdsworth and Dominic Miller. Holdsworth also performed on tour dates in December 1990. Early the following year, before the album's release, Jakko Jakszyk joined as Murphy's permanent touring replacement. After more tour dates, Husband left Level 42 in March 1992. Phil Gould returned in his place the following year, although only for the recording of Forever Now. He was replaced for subsequent tour dates by Gavin Harrison.

After breaking up at the end of their 1994 tour, Level 42 reformed in late 2001 after King secured the rights to use the band name. Joining the frontman were his brother Nathan on guitar, Sean Freeman on saxophone, and returning members Husband (drums) and Lyndon Connah (keyboards). In 2003, an original lineup reunion was attempted by King, Lindup and the Gould brothers (along with frequent contributor Wally Badarou), however after "about four days" of writing new material it "just fell apart". Lindup collaborated with the band again in 2005 to record some keyboard parts for their new studio album Retroglide, before returning on a full-time basis the next year. Billy Cobham substituted for Husband at a number of shows in 2008, before the regular drummer was replaced by Pete Ray Biggin in 2010.

In October 2013, Level 42 released their first new studio material since 2006, the Sirens EP, which introduced new band members Dan Carpenter on trumpet and Nichol Thomson on trombone. The newly expanded horn section later joined the group on tour in 2014.

== Members ==
=== Current ===
Image	Name	Years active	Instruments	Release contributions
	Mark King	1979–1994; 2001–present	bass; lead and backing vocals; occasional percussion, keyboards, synthesisers and guitar	all Level 42 releases
	Mike Lindup	1979–1994; 2006–present	keyboards; synthesisers; piano; backing and lead vocals; percussion	all Level 42 releases from Level 42 (1981) to Forever Now (1994), and from Level 42 at Rockpalast (2005) onwards
	Nathan King	2001–present	guitar; backing vocals	all Level 42 releases from Live 2001 Reading UK (2002) to Live at the Apollo (2004), and from Retroglide (2006) onwards
	Sean "Skip" Freeman	2001–present	saxophone; backing vocals	all Level 42 releases from Live 2001 Reading UK (2002) to Live at the Apollo (2004), and from Retroglide (2006) onwards
	Pete Ray Biggin	2010–present	drums; percussion	all Level 42 releases from 1980–2010: 30th Anniversary World Tour (2011) onwards
	Dan Carpenter	2013–present	trumpet; backing vocals; occasional percussion	Sirens (2013); Sirens Tour Live (2016); Eternity (2019)
	Nichol Thomson	2013–present	trombone; backing vocals; occasional percussion	Sirens (2013); Sirens Tour Live (2016); Eternity (2019)

=== Former ===
Image	Name	Years active	Instruments	Release contributions
	Phil Gould	1979–1987; 1993–1994; 2004	drums; percussion; backing vocals; piano; organ	all Level 42 releases from Level 42 (1981) to Live at Wembley (1987); Forever Now (1994); Level 42 at Rockpalast (2005); The River Sessions (2005)
	Rowland "Boon" Gould	1979–1987; 2012; (died 2019)	guitar; saxophone (early)	all Level 42 releases from Level 42 (1981) to Live at Wembley (1987); Level 42 at Rockpalast (2005); The River Sessions (2005); Retroglide (2006) – guest appearance on one track only
	Gary Husband	1988–1993; 2001–2010	drums; backing vocals; occasional keyboards	all Level 42 releases from Staring at the Sun (1988) to Guaranteed Live (1992), from Live at Wembley (1996) to Live at the Apollo (2004), and from Retroglide (2006) to Live in Holland 2009 (2009)
	Steve Topping	1988	guitar	none
	Alan Murphy	1988–1989 (until his death)	guitar	Staring at the Sun (1988); Fait Accompli (1989); Level Best (1989) – new song "Take Care of Yourself"; Live at Wembley (1996)
	Lyndon Connah	1990 (touring); 2001–2006	keyboards; backing vocals	Live 2001 Reading UK (2002); Greatest Hits Live (2003); Live at the Apollo (2004); Retroglide (2006)

=== Touring ===
Image	Name	Years active	Instruments	Release contributions	Notes
	Gary Barnacle	1981; 1988–1994	saxophone	Level 42 (1981); True Colours (1984); World Machine (1985); Running in the Family (1987); Guaranteed (1991); Forever Now (1994)	Barnacle toured with Level 42 during the 1980s and 1990s, and featured on several studio albums.
	Krys Mach	1984–1988	saxophone	A Physical Presence (1985); Running in the Family (1987); Staring at the Sun (1988); Live At Wembley (1996)	Mach took over from Barnacle in 1984, and remained part of the touring band until Barnacle's return.
	Annie McCaig	1985–1992	backing vocals	Guaranteed (1991)	McCaig joined the touring band after the release of World Machine, appearing on several albums and tours.
	Paul Gendler	1987	guitar	none	Following the Gould brothers' departures, Gendler and Conti filled in for remaining tour dates later that year.
	Neil Conti	1987	drums	none	Following the Gould brothers' departures, Gendler and Conti filled in for remaining tour dates later that year.
	John Thirkell	1988–1994	trumpet	Guaranteed (1991); Forever Now (1994)	Thirkell was added to the group's touring lineup as its first trumpeter in 1988, once Barnacle had returned.
	Allan Holdsworth	1990 (died 2017)	guitar	Guaranteed (1991)	After the death of Alan Murphy in 1989, Holdsworth recorded on Guaranteed and subsequent tour dates.
	Jakko Jakszyk	1991–1994	guitar; backing vocals	Guaranteed (1991)	Jakszyk joined after Holdsworth's short stint in the group, remaining until the band broke up in 1994.
	Gavin Harrison	1994	drums	none	Following Phil Gould's second departure, Harrison performed drums on the 1994 Forever Now tour.
	Billy Cobham	2008	drums	none	Cobham substituted for Gary Husband during 2008, when the regular drummer was unavailable.

=== Session ===
Image	Name	Years active	Instruments	Release contributions
	Wally Badarou	1979–1994; 2001–present	synthesizers; backing vocals; keyboards; organ; piano; guitar	all Level 42 releases from Level 42 (1981) to Forever Now (1994)
	Leroy Williams	1981–1982	congas; bongos; percussion	Level 42 (1981); The Early Tapes (1982)
	Dave Chambers	1981–1982	tenor saxophone	Level 42 (1981); The Early Tapes (1982)
	Pete Wingfield	1982	clavinet	The Pursuit of Accidents (1982)
	Pete Jacobson	1982	synthesizers	The Pursuit of Accidents (1982)
	Paulinho da Costa	1983	percussion	Standing in the Light (1983)
	Andrew Woolfolk	1983	soprano saxophone	Standing in the Light (1983)
	Steve Sidwell	1988	trumpet	Staring at the Sun (1988)
	Dominic Miller	1988–1991	guitars	Staring at the Sun (1988); Guaranteed (1991)
	Danny Blume	1993–1994	guitars	Forever Now (1994)
	Miles Bould	1993–1994	percussion	Forever Now (1994)
	Mitey	1993–1994	voice	Forever Now (1994)
	Derek Watkins	1993–1994	trumpet	Forever Now (1994)
	Stuart Brooks	1993–1994	trumpet	Forever Now (1994)
	Richard Edwards	1993–1994	trombone	Forever Now (1994)

== Lineups ==
Period	Members	Releases
Late 1979 – October 1987 (Classic Lineup)	Mark King – bass, vocals, percussion; Mike Lindup – keyboards, synthesisers, vocals; Boon Gould – guitar, occasional saxophone; Phil Gould – drums, percussion, backing vocals	Level 42 (1981); The Early Tapes (1982); The Pursuit of Accidents (1982); Standing in the Light (1983); True Colours (1984); A Physical Presence (1985); World Machine (1986); Running in the Family (1987); Live at Wembley (1987); Level 42 at Rockpalast (2005); The River Sessions (2005)
October 1987 – early 1988	Mark King – bass, vocals, percussion; Mike Lindup – keyboards, synthesisers, vocals; Paul Gendler – guitar (touring); Neil Conti – drums (touring)	none – live performances only
Early 1988	Mark King – bass, vocals, percussion; Mike Lindup – keyboards, synthesisers, vocals; Steve Topping – guitar; Gary Husband – drums	none – live performances only
Early 1988 – October 1989	Mark King – bass, vocals, percussion; Mike Lindup – keyboards, synthesisers, vocals; Alan Murphy – guitar; Gary Husband – drums	Staring at the Sun (1988); Fait Accompli (1989); "Take Care of Yourself" (1989); Live at Wembley (1996)
October 1989 – late 1990	Mark King – bass, vocals, percussion; Mike Lindup – keyboards, synthesisers, vocals; Gary Husband – drums, keyboards, backing vocals	Guaranteed (1991)
December 1990	Mark King – bass, vocals, percussion; Mike Lindup – keyboards, synthesisers, vocals; Gary Husband – drums, backing vocals; Allan Holdsworth – guitar (touring)	none – live performances only
Early 1991 – March 1992	Mark King – bass, vocals, percussion; Mike Lindup – keyboards, synthesisers, vocals; Gary Husband – drums, backing vocals; Jakko Jakszyk – guitar, backing vocals (touring)	Guaranteed Live (1992)
Early 1993 – mid-1994	Mark King – bass, vocals, percussion; Mike Lindup – keyboards, synthesisers, vocals; Phil Gould – drums, keyboards, backing vocals; Jakko Jakszyk – guitar, backing vocals (touring)	Forever Now (1994)
Mid – late 1994	Mark King – bass, vocals, percussion; Mike Lindup – keyboards, synthesisers, vocals; Jakko Jakszyk – guitar, backing vocals (touring); Gavin Harrison – drums (touring)	none – live performances only
Group inactive 1994–2001
Late 2001 – May 2006	Mark King – bass, vocals, percussion; Nathan King – guitar, backing vocals; Lyndon Connah – keyboards, backing vocals; Gary Husband – drums; Sean Freeman – saxophone, backing vocals	Live 2001 Reading UK (2002); Greatest Hits Live (2003); Live at the Apollo (2004); Retroglide (2006)
May 2006 – February 2010	Mark King – bass, vocals, percussion; Mike Lindup – keyboards, synthesisers, vocals; Nathan King – guitar, backing vocals; Gary Husband – drums; Sean Freeman – saxophone, backing vocals	Retroglide Tour (2007); Live in Holland 2009 (2009)
February 2010 – late 2013	Mark King – bass, vocals, percussion; Mike Lindup – keyboards, synthesisers, vocals; Nathan King – guitar, backing vocals; Pete Ray Biggin – drums, percussion; Sean Freeman – saxophone, backing vocals	1980–2010: 30th Anniversary World Tour (2011); Live from Metropolis Studios (2013); Live in Switzerland (2023)
Late 2013 – present	Mark King – bass, vocals, percussion; Mike Lindup – keyboards, synthesisers, vocals; Nathan King – guitar, backing vocals; Pete Ray Biggin – drums, percussion; Sean Freeman – saxophone, backing vocals; Dan Carpenter – trumpet, backing vocals; Nichol Thomson – trombone, backing vocals	Sirens (2013); Sirens Tour Live (2015); Eternity (2019); Living It Up (2023)
