= Tracie (song) =

Single by Level 42

from the album Staring at the Sun
- B-side: "Three Words"
- Released: 9 January 1989
- Recorded: 1988
- Length: 4:51 (album version); 3:25 (single remix); 5:49 (extended mix)
- Label: Polydor
- Songwriter(s): Mark King; Gary Husband
- Producer(s): Level 42; Wally Badarou; Julian Mendelsohn

Level 42 singles chronology
"Take a Look" (1988)	"Tracie" (1989)	"Take Care of Yourself" (1989)

Music video
- "Tracie" on YouTube

"Tracie" is a song by English jazz-funk band Level 42, written by Gary Husband and Mark King, and recounts King's times with his childhood sweetheart, Tracie Wilson. It appeared on the band's 1988 album Staring at the Sun, and features keyboardist Mike Lindup playing harmonica.

It was remixed, and a new lead vocal recorded, for issue as a single in early 1989, peaking at number 25 in the UK, and at number 14 in the Netherlands. The music video for the single was the last to feature Alan Murphy before the guitarist's death in October 1989. The photo of the band on the sleeve of the single is taken by Linda McCartney.

== Personnel ==
- Mark King – bass, vocals
- Mike Lindup – keyboards, vocals, harmonica
- Gary Husband – drums
- Alan Murphy – guitars
- Wally Badarou – keyboards
- Dominic Miller – guitars
- Krys Mach – saxophone

== Charts ==
Chart (1989)	Peak position
Belgium (Ultratop 50 Flanders)	24
Netherlands (Dutch Top 40)	14
Netherlands (Single Top 100)	16
UK Singles (OCC)	25
