= Guaranteed =

Guaranteed may refer to:

- Guaranteed (Morris Day album)
- Guaranteed (Ronnie Drew album)
- Guaranteed (Phatfish album)
- "Guaranteed" (Eddie Vedder song)
- Guaranteed (Level 42 album)
  - "Guaranteed" (Level 42 song)

== See also ==
- Guarantee (disambiguation)
