= Forever Now =

Forever Now may refer to:

== Albums ==
- Forever Now (The Psychedelic Furs album), 1982
- Forever Now (Level 42 album), 1994
- Forever Now (Switchfoot album), 2026
- Forever Now, 2003 album by Natalise

== Songs ==
- "Forever Now" (Level 42 song)
- "Forever Now" (Cold Chisel song)
- "Forever Now" (Ne-Yo song)
- "Forever Now" (Michael Bublé song), 2019
- "Forever Now", by The Psychedelic Furs from Forever Now
- "Forever Now", by David Wilcox from Airstream
- "Forever Now", by Jon Gibson from Jesus Loves Ya
- "Forever Now", by Eloise Laws from Eloise
- "Forever Now", by Tokio Hotel from Humanoid
- "Forever Now", by Green Day from Revolution Radio
