= Take a Look (song) =

Single by Level 42

from the album Staring at the Sun
- B-side: "Man"
- Released: 17 October 1988
- Recorded: 1988
- Genre: Pop rock
- Length: 4:41
- Label: Polydor
- Songwriters: Mark King; Boon Gould; Mike Lindup; Wally Badarou
- Producers: Level 42; Wally Badarou; Julian Mendelsohn

Level 42 singles chronology
| "Heaven in My Hands" (1988) | "Take a Look" (1988) | "Tracie" (1989) |

Music video
- "Take a Look" on YouTube

"Take a Look" is a song by English jazz-funk band Level 42, released in October 1988 as the second single from their eighth studio album, Staring at the Sun (1988). It reached number 32 on the UK Singles Chart.

== Personnel ==
- Mark King – bass, vocals
- Mike Lindup – keyboards, vocals
- Gary Husband – drums
- Alan Murphy – guitar
- Wally Badarou – keyboards
- Dominic Miller – guitar

== Charts ==
| Chart (1988) | Peak position |
|---|---|
| Belgium (Ultratop 50 Flanders) | 24 |
| Netherlands (Dutch Top 40) | 14 |
| Netherlands (Single Top 100) | 15 |
| UK Singles (OCC) | 32 |
