= Heaven in My Hands =

Single by Level 42

from the album Staring at the Sun
- Released: 22 August 1988
- Recorded: 1988
- Genre: Dance-rock
- Length: 4:40 (album version)
- Label: Polydor
- Songwriters: Mark King; Boon Gould
- Producers: Level 42; Wally Badarou; Julian Mendelsohn

Level 42 singles chronology
"Children Say" (1987)	"Heaven in My Hands" (1988)	"Take a Look" (1988)

"Heaven in My Hands" is a song by the English jazz-funk band Level 42, released in August 1988 as the first single from their eighth studio album, Staring at the Sun (1988). It reached number 12 on the UK Singles Chart. It was the first Level 42 single not to feature the Gould brothers, Boon and Phil, following their departure from the band the previous year. However, Boon did write the song's lyrics.

The instrumental introduction, heard on the extended twelve-inch single version of the song, was heavily used by BBC Sport early in their coverage of the 1989 Wimbledon Championships. The music was also adapted for the Croatian and Slovak versions of the hit television game show Wheel of Fortune.

== Versions ==
- 7" version – 4:08
- Extended version – 7:20
- Remix – 7:10
- Guitarpella mix – 5:47
- Album version – 4:41
- Alternate version – 5:27

== Personnel ==
- Mark King – bass, vocals
- Mike Lindup – keyboards, vocals
- Gary Husband – drums
- Alan Murphy – guitars
- Wally Badarou – keyboards
- Dominic Miller – guitars
- Steve Sidwell – trumpets

== Charts ==
Chart (1988)	Peak position
Belgium (Ultratop 50 Flanders)	6
Finland (Suomen virallinen lista)	10
Germany (GfK)	22
Italy Airplay (Music & Media)	3
Netherlands (Dutch Top 40)	7
Netherlands (Single Top 100)	4
Norway (VG-lista)	10
Switzerland (Schweizer Hitparade)	20
UK Singles (Official Charts)	12
