= Peaceful World =

Peaceful World may refer to:

- World peace, an ideal of freedom, peace, and happiness among and within all nations and/or peoples

== Music ==
- Peaceful World (album), a 1971 album by The Rascals
- "Peaceful World" (John Mellencamp song), a song on Mellencamp's album 2001 Cuttin' Heads
- "Love in a Peaceful World", a 1994 song by British musical group Level 42
