= Dark Blue Dream =

Studio album by Steve Weingart
- Released: 2006
- Recorded: Dennis Moody Studios
- Genre: Jazz fusion
- Length: 53:54
- Label: Skeewa Music
- Producer: Steve Weingart

Steve Weingart chronology
Life Times (2001)	Dark Blue Dream (2006)	Dialogue (2011)

Dark Blue Dream is the second studio album by composer and keyboardist Steve Weingart. Produced by Weingart, the album features guitarist Frank Gambale, bassist Jimmy Earl and drummer Tom Brechtlein. The album was released worldwide in 2006 by Skeewa Music.

== Track listing ==
1. "Night Visitor" (Weingart) – 7:19
2. "Tone Poem #9 (I Thought It Was A Dream)" (Weingart) – 1:37
3. "3 Til Dawn" (Weingart) – 6:48
4. "Soundscape 1" (Weingart) – 2:31
5. "Dark Blue Dream" (Weingart) – 7:28
6. "Asfew (A Song For Ernie Watts)" (Weingart) – 7:32
7. "Unforgotten Path" (Weingart) – 3:24
8. "Soundscape 4" (Weingart) – 2:54
9. "Pursuit" (Weingart) – 6:20
10. "Outside in (part 1)" (Weingart) – 5:58
11. "Outside In (part 2)" (Weingart) – 2:11

== Personnel ==
- Steve Weingart – Piano, Keyboards, Programing
- Frank Gambale - Guitar
- Jimmy Earl - Bass
- Tom Brechtlein – Drums

with special appearances:

- Ernie Watts - Saxophone
- Ronnie Gutierrez - Percussion
- Renee Jones – Bass and Vocals

== Liner notes ==
All music composed by Steve Weingart

Producer: Steve Weingart
Recorded at: Dennis Moody Studios
Recording Engineer: Dennis Moody
Mixed by: Steve Weingart
Mastered by: Ron Boustead at Precision Mastering
CD Design / Artwork / Photos by: Steve Weingart

Special Guest Appearances:
Ernie Watts – Tenor Sax on Asfew
Ronnie Gutierrez – Percussion on Asfew
Renee Jones – Vocals on 3 til Dawn and Unforgotten Path
Bass on Soundscape 1, Sounscape 4 and Unforgotten Path

Frank Gambale plays Yamaha AES-FG Signature guitars, D’Addario strings, and Carvin Tone navigator pre-amps.

Jimmy Earl uses Warwick basses, Gallien Kreuger bass amplification and Dean Markley SR2000 bass strings.

Tom Brechtlein uses Sabian Cymbals, Yamaha drums, Remo drum heads and Colato Regal Tip drumsticks.
Ronnie Gutierrez plays Gon Bops timbale and congas, Vater sticks and Sabian cymbals.

Ernie Watts appears courtesy of Flying Dolphin Records. Ernie plays Keilwerth saxophones exclusively and uses Rico reeds.

Renee Jones would like to thank Steve for being her best friend and the love of her life. Thanks also to Bunny Brunel for his guidance and support.

Thanks to:
Bernie Kirsh, Bob Rice and Ron Boustead for sharing their expertise, Neils Estrup and Owit Music Group, Spectronics music software (Atmosphere & Stylus RMX).

My special thanks to:
My wife and best friend, Renee, for sharing her life and talents with me, my parents, the Jones family, Steve and Cindy Saalfeld, and my Cincinnati family.
