= My Father's Shoes =

Single by Level 42

from the album Guaranteed
- Released: 6 April 1992
- Genre: Rock
- Label: RCA
- Songwriters: Mark King; Wally Badarou; George M. Green; Mike Lindup

Level 42 singles chronology
"Overtime" (1991)	"My Father's Shoes" (1992)	"Forever Now" (1994)

"My Father's Shoes" is a song by English jazz-funk band Level 42, released in April 1992 by RCA Records as the third single from their ninth album, Guaranteed (1991). It was released in only two countries—United Kingdom and Spain. The music video is the last video of Level 42 to feature Jakko Jakszyk and Gary Husband. Jakszyk left the band in 1992, returning in 1994 for the last Level 42 tour prior to the disbandment. Husband left the band in 1992, but returned in 2001 in the reform of the group and stayed in the group until 2010, and recorded the studio album Retroglide (2006). The song peaked at number 55 on the UK Singles Chart.

== Personnel ==
- Mark King – bass, vocals, guitars
- Mike Lindup – keyboards, vocals
- Gary Husband – drums
- Wally Badarou – keyboards
- Dominic Miller – guitars

== Charts ==
Chart (1992)	Peak position
UK Singles (OCC)	55
UK Airplay (Music Week)	43
