= Wardenclyffe Tower (album) =

Studio album by Allan Holdsworth
- Released: 1992
- Studio: Front Page Recorders (Costa Mesa, California); Music Grinder (Los Angeles); Track Record Studios (Los Angeles; Mad Hatter Studios (Los Angeles) The Brewery (North County, San Diego)
- Genre: Jazz fusion
- Length: 43:12
- Label: Restless
- Producer: Allan Holdsworth

Allan Holdsworth chronology
Secrets (1989)	Wardenclyffe Tower (1992)	Hard Hat Area (1993)

Alternative cover
- Japanese edition

Alternative cover
- 2007 remastered edition

Wardenclyffe Tower is the seventh studio album by the British guitarist Allan Holdsworth, released in 1992 through Restless Records (United States) and JMS–Cream Records (Europe), and in 1993 through Polydor Records (Japan); a remastered edition was reissued in 2007 through Eidolon Efformation, containing three bonus tracks (alternative versions of "Tokyo Dream" from 1983's Road Games and "The-Unmerry-Go-Round" from 1985's Metal Fatigue) which were previously only available on the Japanese release.

The album's title is a reference to the Wardenclyffe Tower, or Tesla Tower, designed by inventor Nikola Tesla in 1901 and located in Shoreham, New York. "Zarabeth" is named after a character in the Star Trek episode "All Our Yesterdays".

== Critical reception ==
Professional ratings
Review scores
Source	Rating
AllMusic	1.5/5 stars

Daniel Gioffre at AllMusic awarded Wardenclyffe Tower 1.5 stars out of 5, describing it as "formless" and "not very compelling", and being of value to Holdsworth completists rather than casual listeners. He nonetheless noted "Against the Clock", "Dodgy Boat" and the title track as highlights.

== Track listing ==
All tracks are written by Allan Holdsworth, except where noted.

No.	Title	Length
1.	"5 to 10"	5:36
2.	"Sphere of Innocence"	5:58
3.	"Wardenclyffe Tower"	8:44
4.	"Dodgy Boat" (Steve Hunt)	5:37
5.	"Zarabeth"	6:31
6.	"Against the Clock" (lyrics: Naomi Star)	4:58
7.	"Questions" (Chad Wackerman)	4:07
8.	"Oneiric Moor"	1:41
Total length:		43:12

Japanese/2007 remastered edition bonus tracks
No.	Title	Length
9.	"Tokyo Dream"	5:05
10.	"The Unmerry Go Round Part 4"	3:01
11.	"The Unmerry Go Round Part 5"	1:58

== Personnel ==
- Allan Holdsworth – guitar, SynthAxe, mixing, producer
- Naomi Star – vocals
- Steve Hunt – keyboard (tracks 1, 2, 4, 5)
- Gordon Beck – keyboard (tracks 9–11)
- Chad Wackerman – drums (tracks 1, 3, 5, 7, 9–11), keyboard (track 7)
- Gary Husband – drums (tracks 2, 4), keyboard (track 3)
- Vinnie Colaiuta – drums (track 6)
- Jimmy Johnson – bass
- Joel Schnebelt – spoken vocals
- Robert Feist – engineering
- Gordon Davis – mixing
