= East River Drive (album) =

Studio album by Stanley Clarke
- Released: September 24, 1993
- Studios: Cherokee Studios, Contemporary Artist, Le Gonks West Studio, Rumba Recorders, Universal Scoring Stage
- Genres: Jazz fusion, smooth jazz
- Length: 66:08
- Label: Epic
- Producer: Stanley Clarke

Stanley Clarke chronology
| Passenger 57 (1992) | East River Drive (1993) | The Rite of Strings (1995) |

Professional ratings
Review scores
| Source | Rating |
|---|---|
| AllMusic | 4/5 stars |

East River Drive is an album by jazz fusion bassist Stanley Clarke that was released in 1993.

== Track listing ==
All tracks are written by Stanley Clarke except where noted.

| No. | Title | Writer(s) | Length |
|---|---|---|---|
| 1. | "Justice's Groove" | | 4:07 |
| 2. | "Fantasy Love" | Clarke, Howard Hewett | 4:37 |
| 3. | "Zabadoobeedé? (Yabadoobeeda)" | | 4:35 |
| 4. | "East River Drive" | | 7:47 |
| 5. | "I'm Home Africa" | Clarke, Jimmy Earl, Steve Hunt | 5:59 |
| 6. | "Theme from Boyz 'n the Hood" | | 6:58 |
| 7. | "Christmas in Rio" | | 6:42 |
| 8. | "What If I Forget the Champagne" | | 5:12 |
| 9. | "Never Lose Your Heart/There Lies the Passion" | | 5:59 |
| 10. | "Illegal" | | 3:20 |
| 11. | "Lord of the Low Frequencies" | | 6:07 |
| 12. | "Funk Is Its Own Reward" | | 4:44 |

== Personnel ==
- Stanley Clarke – bass, tenor bass, background vocals
- Gerald Albright – alto and soprano saxophones
- George Howard – bass, soprano saxophone
- Doug Webb – soprano saxophone
- Todd Cochran – keyboards
- George Duke – keyboards
- Steve Hunt – keyboards
- Deron Johnson – keyboards
- Kenny Kirkland – piano
- Doc Powell – guitar
- Paul Jackson Jr. – guitar
- Armand Sabal-Lecco – guitar, piccolo bass, background vocals
- Michael Thompson – guitar
- Hubert Laws – flute
- Jean-Luc Ponty – violin
- Poncho Sanchez – conga
- Alphonso Johnson – bass
- Abraham Laboriel – bass
- Charles Fambrough – double bass
- Jimmy Earl – bass
- Ramon Banda – percussion
- Darryl Jackson – percussion
- Munyungo Jackson – percussion
- Bill Summers – percussion
- Gerry Brown – drums
- Dennis Chambers – drums
- John Robinson – drums
- Carlos Vega – drums
- Howard Hewett – vocals
- Alexis England – background vocals
- Laura Robinson – background vocals
- Anjani Thomas – background vocals

== Production ==
- George Del Barrio – conductor, string arrangements
- Brian Gardner – mastering
- Dan Humann – engineer, mixing
- Allen Sides – engineer
- Steve Sykes – engineer, mixing
