= Dialogue (Steve Weingart & Renee Jones album) =

Studio album by Steve Weingart & Renee Jones
- Released: 2011
- Recorded: Phantom Recordings, Van Nuys, CA.
- Genre: Jazz Fusion
- Length: 56:54
- Label: Skeewa Music
- Producer: Steve Weingart, Co-Produced by Simon Phillips

Steve Weingart & Renee Jones chronology
Dark Blue Dream (2006)	Dialogue (2011)	Observatory (2012)

Dialogue is the first studio album by husband and wife duo Steve Weingart & Renee Jones. The album was recorded at Phantom Recordings in Van Nuys, CA. Produced by Steve Weingart and co-produced by Simon Phillips, the album was released worldwide on in 2011 by Skeewa Music.

== Track listing ==
1. "Village" (Weingart) – 5:32
2. "Restless" (Weingart) – 4:59
3. "Back Down" (Weingart) – 5:37
4. "Eethray" (Weingart) – 5:27
5. "Lighthouse" (Weingart) – 5:04
6. "Busy Day" (Weingart & Jones) – 5:39
7. "Empty Chair (for Zawinul)" (Weingart) – 3:05
8. "Spider Web" (Weingart) – 5:29
9. "Tell Tales" (Weingart & Jones) – 4:59
10. "Do Note Move" (Weingart) – 5:45
11. "Dialogue" (Weingart & Jones) – 5:25

== Personnel ==
- Steve Weingart – Piano, Keyboards, Vocals
- Renee Jones – Electric Bass, Vocals
- Simon Phillips – Drums
- Mike Miller - Electric Guitar, Bouzouki on Busy Day
- Katisse Buckingham - Saxes & Flute
- Lenny Castro - Percussion (1, 4, 6, 9, 11)
- Michael O'Day - Additional percussion on Dialogue
- Steve Lukather - Electric and Acoustic Guitars (6, 11)
- Victor Wooten - Electric Bass (10)

== Liner Notes ==
All songs published by Skeewa Music (ASCAP) except:
Busy Day, Tell Tales, and Dialogue published by Skeewa Music and Intiésin Music (ASCAP)

Steve plays: Clavia Nord Wave, a 1972 Fender Rhodes 73 Stage, and Spectrasonics: Omnisphere & Stylus RMX

Steve Lukather appears courtesy of Mascot Records

Lenny Castro plays: LP Percussion, Paiste Cymbals, Vic Firth sticks, Remo, DW Drums

Steve would like to thank Todd McCurdy for the Rhodes and Nir Benjaminy of ‘Fender Rhodes L.A.’ for the restoration.

Steve and Renee would like to thank the Jones and Weingart families for their love and support.

Producer: Steve Weingart
Co-Producer: Simon Phillips
Recorded and Mixed by: Simon Phillips at Phantom Recordings, Van Nuys, California
Assistant Engineer: Matthew Forsyth
Mastered by: Ron Boustead at Resolution Mastering, Sherman Oaks, California
Photography: Jim Henken
Art and Design: Steven Parke
