= Secrets (Allan Holdsworth album) =

Studio album by Allan Holdsworth
- Released: 6 November 1989
- Studio: Front Page Recorders (Costa Mesa, California); Music Grinder (Los Angeles); The Brewery (North County, San Diego)
- Genre: Jazz fusion
- Length: 37:20
- Label: Intima
- Producer: Allan Holdsworth

Allan Holdsworth chronology
With a Heart in My Song (1988)	Secrets (1989)	Wardenclyffe Tower (1992)

Alternative cover
- 2008 remastered edition

Secrets is the sixth studio album by guitarist Allan Holdsworth, released on 6 November 1989 through Intima Records; a remastered edition was reissued in 2008 through Eidolon Efformation. The album features drummer Vinnie Colaiuta, rather than regular collaborator Chad Wackerman; Wackerman did, however, write and perform drums on the song "Peril Premonition".

== Critical reception ==
Professional ratings
Review scores
Source	Rating
AllMusic	4.5/5 stars

Vincent Jeffries at AllMusic awarded Secrets 4.5 stars out of 5, calling it "a true masterpiece" and "a triumph", whilst highlighting Holdsworth's "unreachable technical standard" and continued development of the SynthAxe.

In a 2013 interview with MusicRadar, Porcupine Tree drummer Gavin Harrison picked Secrets as one of ten "essential drum albums". He praised the drumming of Colaiuta, whom he described as "playing with wild abandon" as well as being "incredibly accurate." Patrick Mameli, guitarist and vocalist for death metal band Pestilence, called Secrets "the greatest fusion album ever recorded".

== Track listing ==
No.	Title	Music	Length
1.	"City Nights"	Gary Husband	2:33
2.	"Secrets" (lyrics: Rowanne Mark)	Allan Holdsworth	4:22
3.	"54 Duncan Terrace"	Holdsworth	4:34
4.	"Joshua"	Steve Hunt	5:59
5.	"Spokes"	Holdsworth	3:32
6.	"Maid Marion"	Hunt	7:16
7.	"Peril Premonition"	Chad Wackerman	4:45
8.	"Endomorph" (lyrics: Mark)	Holdsworth	4:19
Total length:			37:20

== Personnel ==
- Allan Holdsworth – guitar, SynthAxe, spoken vocals (track 7), engineering, mixing, production
- Rowanne Mark – vocals (track 2)
- Craig Copeland – vocals (track 8)
- Gary Husband – keyboard (track 1)
- Steve Hunt – keyboard (tracks 4, 6)
- Alan Pasqua – piano
- Vinnie Colaiuta – drums (except track 7)
- Chad Wackerman – drums (track 7), keyboard (track 7)
- Jimmy Johnson – bass (except track 7)
- Bob Wackerman – bass (track 7)
- Claire Holdsworth – spoken vocals (track 7)

Technical

- Jeffrey Ocheltree – sound effects
- Robert Feist – engineering, mixing
- Biff Vincent – engineering
- Charlie Watts – engineering
- Dan Humann – engineering
- Bernie Grundman – mastering
