= Then! =

Live album by Allan Holdsworth
- Released: 2003
- Recorded: 4–6 May 1990
- Venue: Roppongi Pit Inn (Tokyo)
- Genre: Jazz fusion
- Length: 55:35
- Label: Universal Music
- Producer: Allan Holdsworth, Christopher Hoard, Derek Wilson

Allan Holdsworth chronology
All Night Wrong (2002)	Then! (2003)	The Best of Allan Holdsworth: Against the Clock (2005)

Then! is the second official live album by guitarist Allan Holdsworth, released in 2003 through Universal Music (Japan) and Alternity Records (US), then on 1 June 2004 through JMS–Cream Records (Europe). The recordings were taken from three consecutive concerts in Tokyo, Japan during May 1990.

== Track listing ==
No.	Title	Writer(s)	Length
1.	"Zone I"	Allan Holdsworth, Steve Hunt, Gary Husband, Jimmy Johnson	4:08
2.	"Proto-Cosmos"	Alan Pasqua	5:42
3.	"White Line"	Holdsworth	9:39
4.	"Atavachron"	Holdsworth	4:42
5.	"Zone II"	Holdsworth, Hunt, Husband, Johnson	5:30
6.	"Pud Wud"	Holdsworth	8:05
7.	"House of Mirrors"	Holdsworth	4:26
8.	"Non-Brewed Condiment"	Holdsworth	5:44
9.	"Zone III"	Holdsworth, Hunt, Husband, Johnson	7:39
Total length:			55:35

Japanese edition bonus track
No.	Title	Writer(s)	Length
10.	"Funnels"	Holdsworth	7:11

== Personnel ==
- Allan Holdsworth – guitar, SynthAxe, mixing, production
- Steve Hunt – keyboard
- Gary Husband – drums
- Jimmy Johnson – bass
- Robert Feist – engineering
- Christopher Hoard – production, executive production
- Derek Wilson – executive production
