= Hard Hat Area =

Studio album by Allan Holdsworth
- Released: 1993
- Studio: Front Page Recorders, Costa Mesa, California; The Brewery, North County, San Diego
- Genre: Jazz fusion
- Length: 41:37
- Label: Polydor
- Producer: Allan Holdsworth

Allan Holdsworth chronology
Wardenclyffe Tower (1992)	Hard Hat Area (1993)	None Too Soon (1996)

Alternative cover
- European edition

Hard Hat Area is the eighth studio album by guitarist Allan Holdsworth, released in 1993 through Polydor Records (Japan), JMS–Cream Records (Europe) and Fred Bloggs Music (United Kingdom), and in 1994 through Restless Records (United States); a remastered edition with expanded liner notes was reissued on 15 May 2012 through MoonJune Records.

Holdsworth frequently cited the album as one of his favourites. "Tullio" is a reference to cycling component innovator and company founder Tullio Campagnolo.

== Critical reception ==
Professional ratings
Review scores
Source	Rating
All About Jazz	Favourable
AllMusic	4/5 stars

Hard Hat Area has received mostly positive reviews. John Kelman at All About Jazz called it one of Holdsworth's better solo recordings, naming "Ruhkukah" and "Low Levels, High Stakes" as highlights. He also praised the line-up of keyboardist Steve Hunt, drummer Gary Husband and bassist Skúli Sverrisson, but noted that it was sometimes difficult to distinguish between Hunt's playing and Holdsworth's SynthAxe.

Glenn Astarita at AllMusic called the album one of Holdsworth's "better solo excursions", and "a must-have" for fans of his work. Like Kelman, he named "Ruhkukah" and "Low Levels, High Stakes" as highlights.

== Track listing ==
All music is composed by Allan Holdsworth, except where noted

No.	Title	Length
1.	"Prelude" (Holdsworth, Steve Hunt)	1:35
2.	"Ruhkukah"	5:34
3.	"Low Levels, High Stakes"	9:05
4.	"Hard Hat Area"	6:06
5.	"Tullio"	6:02
6.	"House of Mirrors"	7:47
7.	"Postlude" (Holdsworth, Steve Hunt, Skúli Sverrisson, Gary Husband)	5:28
Total length:		41:37

== Personnel ==
- Allan Holdsworth – guitar, SynthAxe, engineering, mixing, production
- Steve Hunt – keyboard
- Gary Husband – drums
- Skúli Sverrisson – bass

Technical

- Rejean de Grand'Maison – engineering
- Gordon Davis – mixing
- Bernie Grundman – mastering
- Chris Bellman – remastering (reissue)
