= If This Bass Could Only Talk =

Studio album by Stanley Clarke
- Released: 1988
- Studio: Garage Recorders; Ocean Way Recording; Capitol Studios; Baby'O; Cherokee Studios; The Complex; Westlake Recording Studios (Los Angeles, California)
- Genre: Jazz fusion
- Length: 43:10
- Label: Portrait
- Producer: Stanley Clarke; Byron Miller

Stanley Clarke chronology
Hideaway (1986)	If This Bass Could Only Talk (1988)	Passenger 57 (1992)

Professional ratings
Review scores
Source	Rating
AllMusic	4/5 stars

If This Bass Could Only Talk is a 1988 album by American bass player Stanley Clarke.

== Track listing ==
All tracks are written by Stanley Clarke except where noted.

No.	Title	Writer(s)	Length
1.	"If This Bass Could Only Talk"		2:30
2.	"Goodbye Pork Pie Hat"	Charles Mingus	6:24
3.	"I Want to Play for Ya"		3:22
4.	"Stories to Tell"		3:46
5.	"Funny How Time Flies (When You're Having Fun)"	Jimmy Jam, Terry Lewis, Janet Jackson	6:07
6.	"Workin' Man"		6:27
7.	"Tradition"		7:11
8.	"Come Take My Hand"		4:08
9.	"Bassically Taps"		3:15

== Personnel ==
- Stanley Clarke – double bass, bass guitar, acoustic and electric guitar, keyboards
- Wayne Shorter – soprano saxophone (on 2)
- George Howard – soprano saxophone (on 8)
- Freddie Hubbard – trumpet (on 5)
- Allan Holdsworth – guitar (on 4)
- George Duke – piano (on 8)
- Vance Taylor – piano (on 5)
- Eddie Arkin – synthesizer (on 2)
- Steve Hunt – synthesizer (on 6, 7)
- Byron Lee Miller – synthesizer bass (on 5)
- Gregory Hines – tap dancer (on 1, 9)
- Jimmy Earl – bass (on 6, 7)
- Gerry Brown – drums (on 2, 6, 7)
- Stewart Copeland – drums (on 4)
- Leon "Ndugu" Chancler – drums (on 5)
- John Robinson – drums (on 3, 8)
- Paulinho da Costa – percussion (on 5)

== Production ==
- Chris Cuffaro – Photography
- Nancy Donald – Art Direction
- Joe Gastwirt – Engineer
- Mitch Gibson – Engineer
- Bernie Grundman – Mastering
- Mick Guzauski – Mixing
- Dan Humann – Engineer
- Tony Lane – Art Direction
- Csaba Petocz – Engineer
- Steve Sykes – Engineer
