= Steve Weingart =

- Born: March 1966 (age 60); Dayton, Ohio, U.S.
- Genres: Jazz, jazz fusion, funk
- Occupations: Musician, Composer, Producer
- Instrument: Keyboards
- Years active: 1984–present
- Website: www.weingartjones.com

Steve Weingart (born March 1966 in Dayton, Ohio) is an American jazz-funk keyboard player based in Los Angeles, California, United States, who has recorded and performed internationally with an array of well known musical artists.

Amongst many other well-known musicians, Weingart has performed live and/or recorded with Chaka Khan, Steve Lukather, Frank Gambale, Robben Ford, Scott Henderson, Warren Hill, Simon Phillips, Tony MacAlpine, Virgil Donati, Marco Mendoza, Dave Weckl, Eric Marienthal, Kenny Rankin, Jimmy Earl, Ernie Watts, Alain Caron, Michael Ruff, Marilyn Scott, Jimmy Haslip, Terri Lyne Carrington, Jason Scheff, Keith Howland, Tris Imboden, John Patitucci, Bunny Brunel, Tom Brechtlein, Carlitos Del Puerto, Ray Parker Jr., Jeff Babko, Frank Briggs, Ric Fierabracci, Joey Heredia, Oskar Cartaya, Dave Hooper, Ronnie Guitterez, and Mike Miller (guitarist).

== Career ==
In September 2007, Weingart announced a new jazz/funk band. The Steve Weingart Band features Steve Weingart, keyboards; Eric Valentine, drums; Jimmy Earl, bass; Kevin Levi, saxophone; Fred Clark, guitar. Weingart's new band performed their first show at La Ve Lee, Studio City, CA on Thursday, September 13, 2007. Weingart also frequently performs with Marco Mendoza and Joey Heredia, and with a diverse array of other artists.

Steve Weingart performed on Steve Lukather's album Ever Changing Times which was released in February 2008. During the early part of 2008, Weingart continued to perform locally in Studio City, CA, and tour internationally with Warren Hill, as well as writing and recording with his wife, Renee Jones (bass and vocals). Weingart toured with Victor Wooten in March 2008, and in Japan with Simon Phillips in April 2008. Steve Lukather then asked Weingart to put a touring band together, and Weingart selected Eric Valentine (drums) and Carlitos Del Puerto (bass). Ricky Z completed the line up, on rhythm guitar and vocals. The band toured extensively in Europe and across the States during the summer of 2008. Weingart also toured in the United States with Victor Wooten and Derico Watson.

Weingart again performed with Steve Lukather (guitar and vocals) at shows in California during October 2008, and in Japan with Simon Phillips. Lukather's "No Jazz Tour" featured material from each of Lukather's solo albums, and some rarely performed Toto songs. Weingart again joined Lukather for further "Ever Changing Times" tour dates in Europe during early 2009, and on another European tour during the summer of 2009, ending with three dates in Los Angeles in October 2009.

Throughout 2009, Weingart continued to perform at various other gigs across the States, including NAMM, and fronting his own band, featuring Katisse Buckingham, Ronnie Guitterez, Jimmy Earl, Eric Valentine, performances with Simon Phillips, as well as a guest appearance at the James Burton Guitar Festival in August 2009, and at a Janis Joplin tribute concert in Cleveland, Ohio, in November 2009. During breaks between his touring commitments in 2009, Weingart recorded his third solo album, following Life Times Vol.1 and Dark Blue Dream, featuring his wife, Renee Jones, on bass guitar. The resulting album, Dialogue, includes his own lead vocals and appearances from Steve Lukather, Victor Wooten, Mike Miller, Lenny Castro, Katisse Buckingham and Simon Phillips. Weingart, Jones, Buckingham and Phillips performed at release parties for Dialogue at the Baked Potato in North Hollywood.

Weingart teamed with Lukather again for his late 2010 album, All's Well That Ends Well and the 2013 album, Transition. Weingart and Renee Jones have toured in Europe with Steve Lukather and Eric Valentine. During early 2012, they toured with Lukather's band to perform in Australia with G3 featuring Steve Vai and Joe Satriani, followed by a short tour of Japan.

November 2012 brought the release of Observatory, their second album. The husband and wife duo consist of keyboardist and pianist Steve Weingart and bassist Renee Jones.

== Influences ==
Weingart's musical influences include Herbie Hancock, Chick Corea, Joe Zawinul, McCoy Tyner, Weather Report, Robert Lamm and Chicago. Weingart has since gone on to perform and/or record with "Chicago" members Tris Imboden, Keith Howland and Jason Scheff.

== Discography ==
Solo

- Life Times (2001)
- Dark Blue Dream (2006)

Steve Weingart & Renee Jones

- Dialogue (2011) Featuring Simon Phillips, Katisse Buckingham, and Mike Miller
- Observatory (2012) Featuring Simon Phillips, Katisse Buckingham, Chris Wabich, and Mike Miller
- Oasis (2018)

with Simon Phillips

- Protocol II (2013)
- Protocol III (2015)

with Steve Lukather

- El Grupo Live (2005)
- Ever Changing Times (2008)
- All's Well That Ends Well (2010; co-writer)
- Transition (2013)

with The Howland/Imboden Project

- The Howland/Imboden Project (2001)
- Live at the Baked Potato (2004)

with Dave Weckl

- Transition (2000; co-writer)
- Perpetual Motion (2002; co-writer)
- Live and Very Plugged In (2003; co-writer)
- Multiplicity (2005; co-writer)

with Marco Mendoza

- Casa Mendoza

Weingart is also featured on Bunny Brunel's "Cafe Au Lait" and Jeff Richman's "One Two". Through 2006 and 2007, Steve Weingart's band, Nu Alliance, featured Tom Brechtlein, Frank Gambale and Carlitos Del Puerto. Weingart recently recorded with Jason Scheff, Jeff Babko and Tom Brechtlein for a fusion project with a working title "Life". Weingart recently recorded keyboards for Frank Briggs' most recent project.

== Live performance ==
Having toured internationally with Steve Lukather's El Grupo, Dave Weckl, Virgil Donati, Simon Phillips and most recently the Steve Lukather Band, Steve Weingart has toured across North America with Victor Wooten and extensively with Warren Hill. Weingart has also performed live frequently at jazz festivals across the United States and at jazz clubs in Studio City, California with artists including Marco Mendoza, Joey Heredia, Mike Miller, Jimmy Earl, Simon Phillips, Eric Valentine, Victor Wooten, Derico Watson, Eric Marienthal, Frank Briggs, Hussain Jiffry, Dave Hooper, Frank Gambale, Tommy Lockett, Tom Brechtlein and Carlitos Del Puerto. Steve Weingart's band, Nu Alliance was formed in December 2006, featuring Frank Gambale, Tom Brechtlein and Carlitos Del Puerto. More recently, Weingart formed a new band featuring Katisse Buckingham, Jimmy Earl and Eric Valentine.

== Personal life ==
Weingart was born in Dayton, Ohio, and is a graduate of the College Conservatory of Music, Cincinnati, Ohio. Weingart lives in Burbank, California and is married to Renee Jones.
