= Observatory (Steve Weingart & Renee Jones album) =

Studio album by Steve Weingart & Renee Jones
- Released: November 2012
- Recorded: Phantom Recordings, Van Nuys, CA.
- Genre: Jazz Fusion
- Length: 49:24
- Label: Skeewa Music
- Producer: Steve Weingart and Simon Phillips

Steve Weingart & Renee Jones chronology
Dialogue (2011)	Observatory (2012)

Observatory is the second studio album by husband and wife duo Steve Weingart & Renee Jones. Co-produced by Steve Weingart and Simon Phillips, the CD was released worldwide on November 27, 2012 by Skeewa Music.

== Track listing ==
1. "Twenty Twelve" (Weingart) – 5:15
2. "Time Will Tell" (Weingart & Jones) – 6:49
3. "Conspiracy" (Weingart) – 5:21
4. "Ethos" (Weingart & Jones) – 5:28
5. "Nostalgia" (Weingart) – 4:32
6. "Echoplexity" (Weingart & Jones) – 8:55
7. "Shelter" (Weingart) – 6:27
8. "After" (Weingart) – 6:37

== Personnel ==
- Steve Weingart – Piano, Keyboards, Vocals
- Renee Jones – Electric Bass, Vocals
- Simon Phillips – Drums (except After)
- Katisse Buckingham - Saxes & Flutes
- Chris Wabich - Percussion, Drums on After, Steel Drums on Shelter
- Mike Miller - Electric Guitar on Twenty Twelve
