= Guarantee (disambiguation) =

A guarantee is a type of legal contract, stronger than a warranty or "security".

Guarantee may also refer to:

- Guarantee (international law), a promise by one state to protect the international obligations of another from third-party interference
- Guarantee (filmmaking), a promise of remuneration if a contracted person is released from a contract
- The Guarantee, a 2014 Irish film
- "Guarantee", a 2022 song by Black Eyed Peas from the album Elevation (Black Eyed Peas album)

== See also ==
- Guaranteed (disambiguation)
