= Steve Hunt =

American jazz pianist and composer (born 1958)

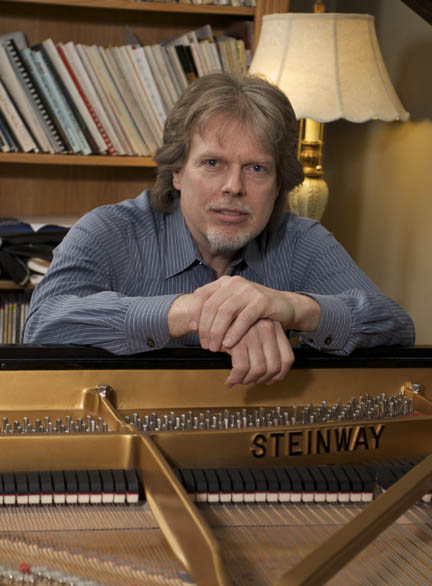
- Steve Hunt at home Photo courtesy of John Doucette

Background information
- Born: Steven Hunt; 1958 (age 67–68)
- Origin: Texas, U.S.
- Genres: Jazz, Jazz fusion
- Occupations: Musician, composer, record producer
- Instruments: Piano, keyboards, organ
- Years active: 1980–present
- Label: Spice Rack
- Website: Steve Hunt artist page

Steven Hunt (born 1958) is an American jazz pianist and composer. He has released two studio albums, recorded extensively, and toured the world.

== Music career ==
In 1977, Hunt graduated from Brazoswood High School in Clute, Texas. He then attended Berklee College of Music in Boston, where he graduated in 1980. Later, Hunt returned to Berklee, where he is an instructor in the piano department.

While recording and performing in the Boston area with his Berklee contemporaries Randy Roos and Tiger Okoshi, Hunt also performed with Peter Calo's bands Bellvista, and Thin Ice. During 1985, he toured with fusion drummer Billy Cobham.

From late 1985 to 1987, he served as musical director for the Jazz Explosion. Here, he led a trio which backed up one or more important artists on tours. The trio consisted of Hunt, bassist Jimmy Earl, and Victor Jones on drums. The artists included: Gato Barbieri, Angela Bofill, Tom Browne, Stanley Clarke, the late George Duke, Kenny G, Freddy Hubbard, Ramsey Lewis, Noel Pointer, Stanley Turrentine, and the late Phyllis Hyman. The Jazz Explosion performed in the Kennedy Center in Washington, the Circle Star Theater in San Francisco, the Beacon Theatre in New York, the Universal Theater in Los Angeles, and Hammersmith Odeon in London.

In 1987, Hunt left the Jazz Explosion to go, with Earl and drummer Gerry Brown, on a tour of Europe led by fusion bassist Stanley Clarke and guitarist Allan Holdsworth. In 1988, he recorded on Clarke's album If This Bass Could Only Talk, and in 1993, on East River Drive, where he is credited with helping to compose the song "I'm Home Africa".

From 1987 to 2003, Hunt performed, toured, and recorded as a member of Allan Holdsworth's band. Several of his compositions appear on Holdsworth's albums. On Secrets (1989), Hunt is credited with composing "Maid Marion", and "Joshua". On Wardenclyffe Tower (1992), he did "Dodgy Boat". On Hard Hat Area, he helped to write "Prelude" and "Postlude". On the album Then!, which was recorded live in Japan, he helped with "Zone I", "Zone II", and "Zone III". Tracks from these albums are included in the compilation The Best of Allan Holdsworth: Against the Clock.

In 1997, percussionist Gregg Bendian recorded on Hunt's album From Your Heart and Soul, which also featured a performance by Holdsworth. This began a relationship in which Hunt recorded on four of Bendian's albums. Two of these, Trio Pianissimo and Change, are studio albums with Bendian's Trio Pianissimo, and two are part of Bendian's Mahavishnu Project, which is his tribute to John McLaughlin.

In Chelmsford, Massachusetts, Hunt runs a record company, Spice Rack Records, which is closely associated with The Kitchen Recording Studio. These companies created both Hunt's first album, mentioned above, and in 2007, his second, Live at the PCA. In other releases, Hunt serves not only as producer, arranger, or engineer, but also as a performer. The label has recorded works by guitarist David Hines (2 albums), his wife, pianist Pamela Hines (5 albums), and bassist Christian Fabian (2 albums). Eight more single releases are by: Auditory Implant, Robert Badoglio, Peter Fedele, Isha, Lucas Pickford, Lewis Robinson, Ed Spargo, and Nicole Storm.

Hunt has recorded extensively as a guest artist. An example is Peter Janson's album Beautiful Day, on which Hunt is credited with helping to compose the songs "December Morning Sun", "Dragonfly", and "Beautiful Day".

When he is not busy in The Kitchen, Hunt performs locally and on tour. Occasionally, he also performs in festivals and at conventions.

Hunt has collaborated with guitarist Tim Miller, releasing their first record together "Changes" on December 1, 2024.

== Discography ==
=== Studio albums ===
- From Your Heart and Your Soul (Spice Rack) (1997)
- Live at the PCA (Spice Rack) (2007)
- Sphere of Influence (Spice Rack) (2015)
- Connections (Spice Rack) (2021)
- Changes (2024)

=== With Allan Holdsworth ===
- Secrets (Relativity) (1989)
- Wardenclyffe Tower (Restless) (1992)
- Hard Hat Area (Relativity) (1994)
- Then! (Alternity) (2004)

=== With Stanley Clarke ===
- If This Bass Could Only Talk (Portrait) (1988)
- East River Drive (Epic) (1993)
- Trios: East River Drive/Schooldays/Live at the Greek (Sony) (2004)

=== With Gregg Bendian ===
- Trio Pianissimo (Aggregate Music) (1999)
- The Mahavishnu Project: Live Bootleg (Aggregate Music) (2002)
- The Mahavishnu Project: Phase 2 (Aggregate Music) (2005)
- Change (Aggregate Music) (2005)

=== As a performer on releases by Spice Rack Records ===
- Blown Fuse, Lukas Pickford (2001)
- Nebula, David Hines, (2005)
- Inner Duality, David Hines, (2009)
- Re-Evaluation Time, Roberto Badoglio, (2010)
- Too Much TV, Ed Spargo, (2010)

=== As a guest artist ===
- Guitar on the Edge, Mark Varney, (Legato) (1992)
- Liquid Smoke, Randy Roos, (Narada) (1992)
- Kinetic Energy, Raz, (Narada) (1998)
- Stay the Same, Joey McIntire, (Sony) (1999)
- Beautiful Day, Peter Janson, (Eastern Woods Music), (2006)
- U – Turn, Sebastiaan Cornelissen, (Abstract Logix) (2009)
