= Overtime (Level 42 song) =

Single by Level 42

from the album Guaranteed
- Released: 7 October 1991
- Genre: Jazz-funk
- Length: 4:47 (album version); 3:50 (radio edit); 7:55 (The "Lorimer" mix); 5:08 (The Hen Pecked Horns mix); 6:50 (The "Lorimer" instrumental mix)
- Label: BMG (UK)
- Songwriters: Mike Lindup; Mark King; Drew Barfield
- Producers: Level 42; Wally Badarou

Level 42 singles chronology
"Guaranteed" (1991)	"Overtime" (1991)	"My Father's Shoes" (1992)

"Overtime" is a song by English jazz-funk band Level 42, released as a single from the 1991 album, Guaranteed. It was written by Mike Lindup, Mark King and Drew Barfield. It reached number 62 on the UK Singles Chart.

The music video was filmed in black and white and set in a factory.

== Personnel ==
- Mark King – bass, vocals, guitars
- Mike Lindup – keyboards, vocals
- Gary Husband – drums
- Jakko Jakszyk – guitars, backing vocals
- Wally Badarou – keyboards
- Gary Barnacle – saxophone

== Charts ==
Chart (1991)	Peak position
Netherlands (Single Top 100)	51
UK Singles (OCC)	62
UK Airplay (Music Week)	29
