= Guaranteed (Level 42 song) =

1991 single by Level 42

Single by Level 42

from the album Guaranteed
- Released: August 1991
- Genre: Jazz-funk
- Length: 4:51 (album version); 3:57 (7" version); 6:46 (The New Avengers mix); 6:29 (Wheel Spin Warrior mix)
- Label: RCA
- Songwriters: Mike Lindup; Mark King; Gary Husband; Wally Badarou
- Producers: Level 42; Wally Badarou

Level 42 singles chronology
| "Take Care of Yourself" (1989) | "Guaranteed" (1991) | "Overtime" (1991) |

Music video
- "Guaranteed" on YouTube

"Guaranteed" is a song by English jazz-funk band Level 42. It was released in August 1991 by RCA Records as part of the band's ninth album, Guaranteed (1991). This was the band's first single of the 1990s, following their previous single, "Take Care of Yourself", released two years earlier. It peaked at number 17 on the UK Singles Chart.

== Background ==
The song was written by Mark King, Mike Lindup, Gary Husband, and Wally Badarou, who was also the producer and a secondary composer and musician for the group. The guitar parts were performed by Allan Holdsworth, the band's guitarist at the time. Mark King provided lead vocals on the verses, with a duet featuring Mike Lindup’s falsetto on the chorus. The song follows a similar structure to "Two Hearts Collide," released in 1988 on the album Staring at the Sun.

== Music video ==
This song has two different music videos, both directed by "The Mill." Each version features the band performing the song in two distinct settings: the first version is set outdoors in the mountains, while the second takes place in a white room. The second version also includes some scenes from the first. Both versions feature Jakko Jakszyk on guitar, as guitarist Allan Holdsworth left the group after the album was completed.

== Reception ==
Music & Media commented that "Guaranteed" had "a good melody" with a "hammering" bass part from Mark King. It reached the top 20 in the UK and achieved chart success throughout Europe, ascending from No. 86 to No. 29 on the European Hot 100 Singles chart by its second week on the listing.

== Charts ==
=== Weekly charts ===
| Chart (1991) | Peak position |
|---|---|
| Belgium (Ultratop 50 Flanders) | 20 |
| Europe (European Hot 100 Singles) | 29 |
| Europe (European Hit Radio) | 6 |
| Germany (GfK) | 51 |
| Ireland (IRMA) | 25 |
| Luxembourg (Radio Luxembourg) | 11 |
| Netherlands (Dutch Top 40) | 13 |
| Netherlands (Single Top 100) | 20 |
| UK Singles (Official Charts) | 17 |
| UK Airplay (Music Week) | 2 |
| UK Dance (Music Week) | 51 |

=== Year-end charts ===
| Chart (1991) | Position |
|---|---|
| Europe (European Hit Radio) | 59 |
