= Take Care of Yourself =

Single by Level 42

from the album Level Best
- Released: 16 October 1989
- Genre: Jazz-funk
- Label: Polydor
- Songwriter: Mark King
- Producer: Level 42

Level 42 singles chronology
"Tracie" (1989)	"Take Care of Yourself" (1989)	"Guaranteed" (1991)

Music video
- "Take Care of Yourself" on YouTube

"Take Care of Yourself" is a song by English jazz-funk band Level 42, released on the compilation album Level Best in 1989. The music video is a retrospective of rock styles from the 1960s through to the '80s, and features (for that time) state-of-the-art animation.

== Track listing ==
1. "Take Care of Yourself" – 4:35
  Producer – Level 42
  Writer – M. King
2. "Silence" (live) – 5:00
  Producer – Julian Mendelsohn, Level 42, Wally Badarou
  Writer – M. Lindup
3. "Man" (live) – 7:07
  Producer – Julian Mendelsohn, Level 42, Wally Badarou
  Writer – R. Gould, M. King, W. Badarou

== Personnel ==
- Mark King – bass, vocals
- Mike Lindup – keyboards, vocals
- Gary Husband – drums
- Alan Murphy – guitars

== Charts ==
=== Weekly charts ===
Weekly chart performance for "Take Care of Yourself"
Chart (1989)	Peak position
Belgium (Ultratop 50 Flanders)	30
Italy Airplay (Music & Media)	4
Netherlands (Dutch Top 40)	11
Netherlands (Single Top 100)	14
UK Singles (OCC)	39
