= Benny Greb =

German drummer and singer (born 1980)

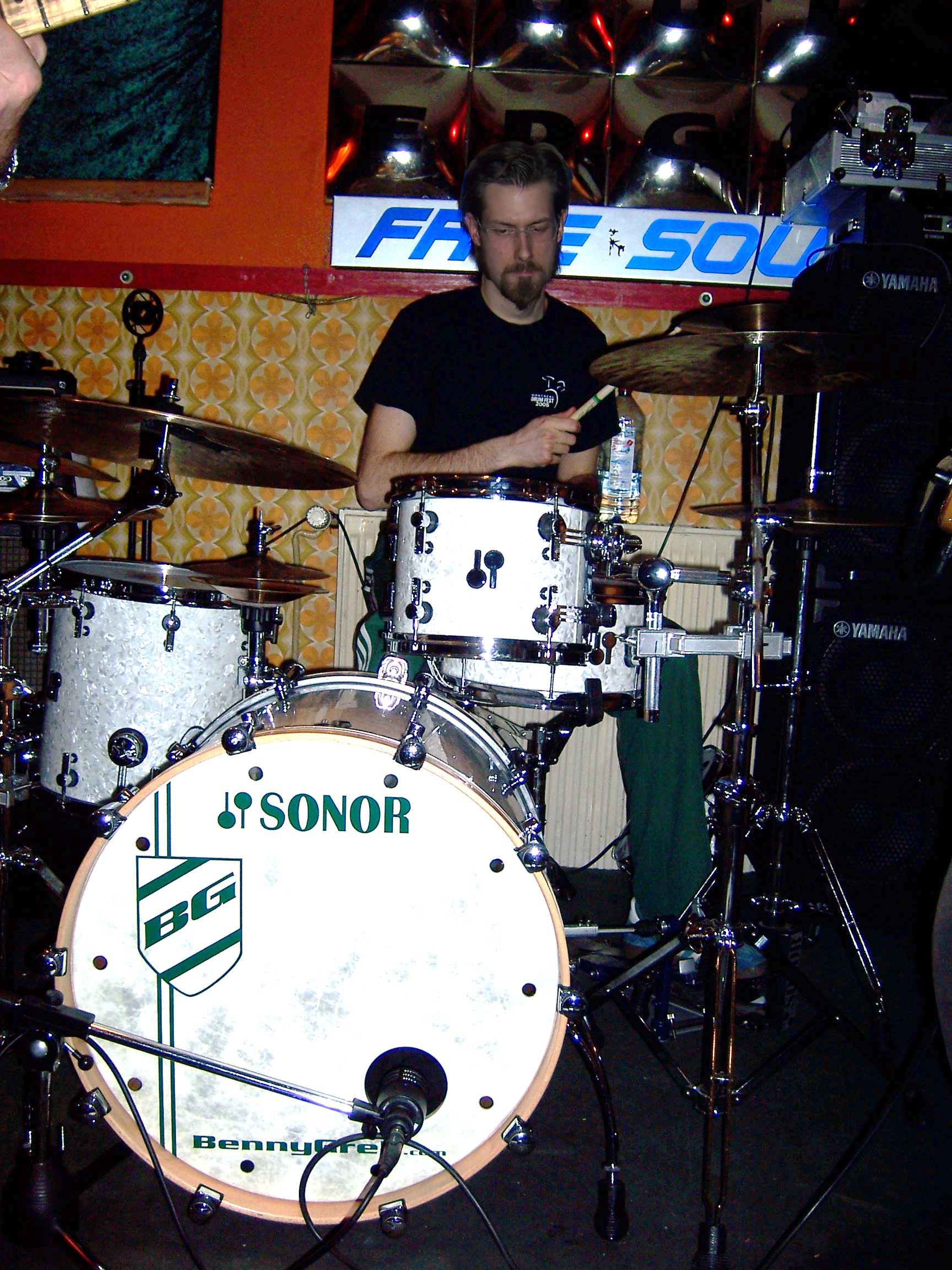
- Greb in 2009

Background information
- Born: 13 June 1980 (age 45)
- Origin: Augsburg, West Germany
- Genres: New wave, Rock, Jazz
- Occupations: Musician, music teacher
- Instruments: Drums, percussion, vocals
- Years active: 2002 – present
- Website: www.bennygreb.de

Benny Greb (born 13 June 1980 in Augsburg, West Germany) is a German drummer, singer and clinician. He started playing the drums at age six and began taking lessons at age twelve. He plays a large variety of music and can be seen playing rock with Stoppok and The Ron Spielman Trio, jazz with The Benny Greb Brass Band and Sabri Tulug Tirpan, funk with Jerobeam, fusion with the NDR Big Band on their Frank Zappa Project, with 3erGezimmeR and Wayne Krantz, and acoustic punk with Strom & Wasser. He has also performed at the Modern Drummer Festival 2010 and at many clinics and drum festivals around the world. Greb is endorsed by Sonor Drums and has his signature snare, Remo Drum Heads, Vic Firth, and by Meinl Percussion. With Meinl, He developed a signature line of Byzance Vintage Series cymbals including the "Sand Ride" and "Sand Hats," both known for their sandblasted finishes. In 2012, Meinl introduced new "Sand Crash" and "Sand Crash/Ride" cymbals to the Byzance Vintage lineup.

In 2009, Greb released his Hudson Music DVD "The Language of Drumming". In 2015, he released his DVD "The Art And Science Of Groove".

== Gear ==
Greb endorses Sonor Drums

- Sonor Vintage Series in "Vintage Pearl"
- 20" x 14" Bass Drum
- 10" x 8" Tom
- 16" x 14" Floor Tom
- 13" x 5.75" Signature Snare 2.0 (Beech)
- 13" x 5.75" Signature Snare 2.0 (Brass)

Greb endorses Meinl Percussion and Meinl Cymbals.

(From Left to Right)

- 8" Classics Bell High (used as Xhat bottom)
- 8" Byzance Dark Splash (used as Xhat top)
- 14” GenerationX Trash Hat China (second hihat bottom) (occasionally)
- 14” Byzance Sand hats
- 14” Generation X Trash Hat China (used underneath the crash)
- 18” Byzance Sand Thin Crash (on top of the China)
- 8" Artist Concept Crasher Hats
- 20” Byzance Sand Ride
- 16” Byzance Trash Crash (two pcs used as Xhat)
- 22” Byzance Sand Crash Ride
- Hardware – Sonor 600 Series
- Pedals – Sonor Giant Step
- Drum Heads – Remo
- Sticks – Vic Firth Benny Greb Signature Sticks
- Percussion Meinl Bongos, Cowbells and Shakers

== Discography ==
=== Poetry Club ===
- 2007: Goldene Zeit

=== Stoppok ===
- 2008: Sensationsstrom
- 2009: Auf Zeche

=== Jerobeam ===
- 2004: Confidential Breakfast
- 2009: How One Becomes What One Is

=== Benny Greb ===
- 2005: Grebfruit
- 2009: Brass Band
- 2013: Two Day Trio
- 2014: Moving Parts
- 2016: Moving Parts (Live)
- 2017: Grebfruit 2

=== 3erGezimmeR ===
- 2009: 3erGezimmeR

=== Strom und Wasser ===
- 2005: Spielt Keine Rolle
- 2006: Gossenhauer
- 2007: Farbengeil
- 2009: Emotionsdesign
- 2011: Mondpunk

=== Thomas D ===
- 2011: Lektionen in Demut 11.0

=== Blue Touch Paper ===
- 2011: Stand Well Back
- 2013: "Drawing Breath"

=== Ron Spielman Trio ===
- 2008: Absolutely Live
- 2012: Electric Tales

=== Nils Wülker ===
- 2012: Just Here Just Now
- 2015: Up
- 2017: ON

=== DVDs ===
- 2009: The Language of Drumming
- 2010: Modern Drummer Festival
- 2015: The Art & Science Of Groove

=== Nick Johnston ===
- 2019: Wide Eyes in The Dark
