= Jimmy Earl =

American jazz bass guitarist

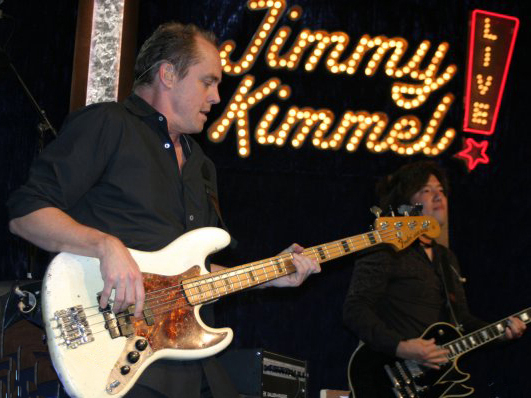
- Jimmy Earl on Jimmy Kimmel Live! Photo courtesy of Don Barris

Background information
- Born: James Christopher Earl; April 5, 1957 (age 69); Boston, Massachusetts, U.S.
- Genres: Jazz, jazz fusion
- Occupations: Musician, songwriter, record producer
- Instrument: Bass guitar
- Years active: 1973–present
- Labels: Legato, Severn

James Christopher Earl (born 1957) is an American jazz bass guitarist who is a member of the Jimmy Kimmel Live! band.

== Early life and education ==
In 1957, James Christopher Earl was born in Boston, Massachusetts, to James and Sylvia Earl. He is the second of their four children. Shortly after his birth, the family moved to Saint Paul, Minnesota, and in 1965 to Hyattsville, Maryland, where he attended elementary school and Northwestern High School.

== Music career ==
Earl began classical guitar lessons at age 10. In 1972, he picked up an electric bass guitar for $15 at the Rose Bowl flea market in Pasadena, California, where his family was living temporarily. In 1973, with his high school classmates Dan Hovey and Rex Wilson, he formed his first band, Cosmic Rainbow.

=== Boston ===
In 1975–76, he attended Berklee College of Music in Boston. In 1981, he studied briefly at the New England Conservatory of Music where he sits on the board of visitors. He also studied with Charlie Banacos. In 1983, he joined Tiger Okoshi's Baku, which performed in the 1984 Newport Jazz Festival. In 1985, he joined a band led by jazz drummer Bob Moses, with whom he appeared in Boston and Cambridge. Earl began his recording career in Boston in 1986 when he supported David Gilden on Ancestral Voices. This album featured the kora, a West African 21-string harp.

=== New York ===
In 1986, Earl moved to New York City and on the recommendation of his friend Steve Hunt joined the Jazz Explosion. In this group he worked with Gato Barbieri, Angela Bofill, Tom Browne, Stanley Clarke, George Duke, Freddie Hubbard, Phyllis Hyman, Ramsey Lewis, Lonnie Liston Smith, and Stanley Turrentine. He met bass guitarist Stanley Clarke, who became his mentor and friend, and joined Clarke's tour of Brazil with Larry Graham. Shortly after, he met Joe Sample at the Blue Note Jazz Club in New York City, and Sample invited him to join The Crusaders. During 1986 and 1987, he toured with them in the U.S., Europe, and Japan.

=== Los Angeles ===
In 1988, Earl moved to Los Angeles and recorded on Clarke's album If This Bass Could Only Talk. It was followed in 1993 by East River Drive, on which Earl is credited as co-writer on "I'm Home Africa". In 1990 he appeared on two albums by the Mark Varney Project. The first, Truth in Shredding, featured jazz guitarist Allan Holdsworth and Frank Gambale. On the second, Centrifugal Funk, he worked as arranger and producer.

In 1993, Earl replaced John Patitucci in the Chick Corea Elektric Band, which went on tour. On returning, he worked with his Elektric bandmate Eric Marienthal on the album One Touch and helped write the song "Backtalk". During the same year, he appeared on the album Elektric Band II: Paint the World and co-wrote with Corea "Ished", "Spanish Sketch", and "Reprise". The album was nominated for the 1994 Grammy Award for Best Contemporary Jazz Album. Two years later he joined the band's collaboration with Steve Vai's on the tribute album The Songs of West Side Story, which was certified gold. In 2002, he participated in the Elektric Band's reunion tour of the U.S., which included two performances at the Blue Note. In another reunion, Earl performed on Manhattan Transfer's album The Chick Corea Songbook (2009).

While touring with Corea in 1993, Earl performed in Rome, Italy, with Pino Daniele, who invited them to record on his album Che Dio ti benedica. This was the first of five albums he recorded with Daniele from 1993 to 1999. In 1995, while touring with Daniele to promote Non calpestare i fiori nel deserto, he played in Milan, Italy, with Pat Metheny.

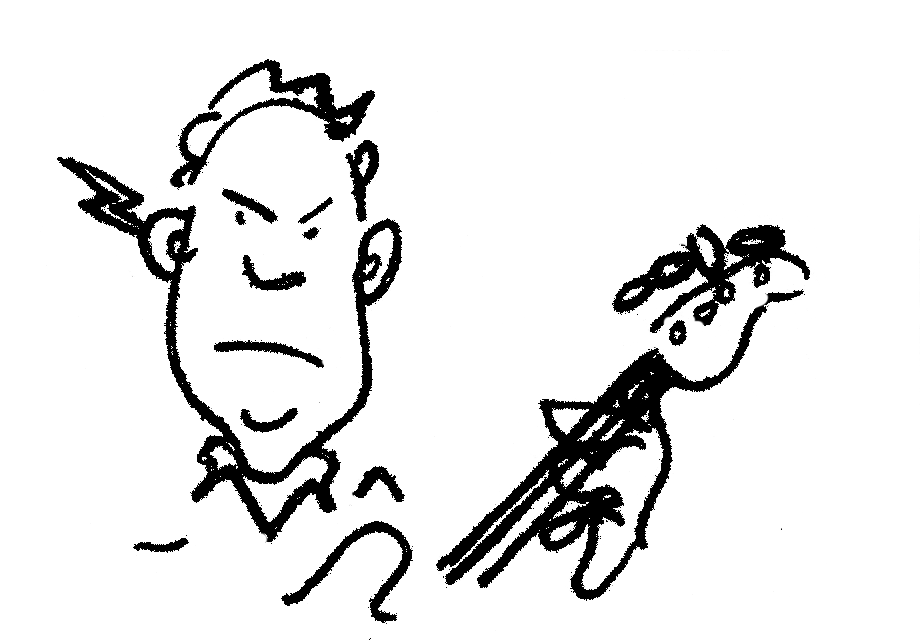
Caricature of Jimmy Earl by Dicky Barrett drawn on the set of Jimmy Kimmel Live!

In that year, he recorded Jimmy Earl, which featured David Batteau, Mitchel Forman, Frank Gambale, Deron Johnson, Gary Novak, Rique Pantoja, Randy Roos, Steve Tavaglione, and Dave Weckl. This album presents Earl's solo bass rendition of Maurice Ravel's "Pavane for a Dead Princess" (1899). It was followed in 1997 by his second album, Stratosphere, which features John Beasley, Daniele, Johnson, Forman, and Simon Phillips. It is an exploration into combining performances by live musicians with electronic music. On March 20, 2012, Severn Records reissued updated versions of these albums, which have been reviewed in Bass Player magazine. Subsequently, on January 21, 2014, Severn released another album by Earl, Renewing Disguises. Cover art for this album is based on a caricature of Earl drawn by Dicky Barrett.

In 1996, Tom Brechtlein recommended Earl as a replacement for Roscoe Beck in Robben Ford's band, The Blue Line, which was about to go on a bus tour of Europe. On returning, Ford started a new band, which began with a series of west coast performances. These included appearances at Catalina Bar and Grill in Hollywood, and at Yoshi's in Oakland, California, where Vinnie Colaiuta was featured on drums. Ford's album Supernatural was recorded and released in 1999. In 2001, Ford's band recorded New Morning: The Paris Concert. This DVD captured a live performance at the New Morning club in Paris. It was followed, in 2002, by Ford's first album with Concord Jazz, Blue Moon, on which Earl is credited with producing "Good to Love". Later, Earl recorded on two more Ford albums: Keep on Running (2003), and Truth (2007), which was nominated for the 2008 Grammy Award for Best Contemporary Blues Album. Moreover, in August 2007, Truth became the number one blues album on the Billboard chart.

In 2003, he recorded on the album Man @ Work with Colin Hay. Earl's work with Man @ Work is only one of dozens of collaborations and compilations in which he performed as a guest artist. In the discography, there is a listing of some of these appearances, but it is more representative than exhaustive.

=== Jimmy Kimmel Live! ===
In late 2002, Jimmy Earl was invited to join a new band, Cleto and the Cletones, which had just been tapped to be the house band on the ABC late-night television program Jimmy Kimmel Live!.

After the show and on weekends Earl performs once or twice per month at the Baked Potato club in Studio City. He has appeared with Dean Brown, Deron Johnson, Scott Kinsey, Simon Phillips, Jeff Richman, Steve Tavaglione, Steve Weingart, Zigaboo Modeliste, and with salsa singer Cecilia Noël and the Wild Clams. Earl's association with the Wild Clams goes back to 1995 when he performed with them at the National Theater of Cuba in Havana. This concert ended a sixteen-year period during which American musical groups were banned from performing in Cuba.

== Equipment ==
In 1990, Earl began a relationship with the German company Warwick. In 1993, Warwick issued the Jimmy Earl Signature Streamer Stage II five string bass guitar. Other Warwick basses that he has used are a Thumb and a fretless Dolphin. During the 2012 NAMM Show at the Anaheim Convention Center, Warwick introduced another Jimmy Earl Signature Bass.

On Jimmy Kimmel Live!, he uses Fender basses: a white '66 Fender Jazz Bass, a red '66 Fender Jazz, and occasionally a sunburst '73 Fender Precision Bass. These instruments are fitted with Dean Markley SR2000 medium-light strings. For amplification, he uses a Gallien-Krueger 800RB head and 410SBX 4x10 cabinet.

== Discography ==
=== As leader or co-leader ===
- 1995 – Jimmy Earl (EFA; reissued in 2012 by Severn)
- 1999 – Stratosphere (Pacific Time Entertainment; reissued in 2012 by Severn)
- 2014 – Renewing Disguises (Severn)

With The Mark Varney Project

- 1990 – Truth in Shredding (Legato)
- 1991 – Centrifugal Funk (Legato)

With Stanley Clarke

- 1988 – If This Bass Could Only Talk (Portrait)
- 1993 – East River Drive (Epic)
- 2003 – 1, 2, to the Bass (Sony)

With Chick Corea

- 1993 – Paint the World (GRP)
- 1996 – The Songs of West Side Story (RCA Victor)
- 2004 – The Very Best of Chick Corea (Universal)

With Pino Daniele

- 1993 – Che Dio ti benedica (Musicrama)
- 1995 – Non calpestare i fiori nel deserto (GCD)
- 1997 – Dimmi cosa succede sulla terra (Musicrama)
- 1998 – Yes I Know My Way (GCD)
- 1999 – Come un gelato all'equatore (GCD)

With Robben Ford

- 1999 – Supernatural (Blue Thumb)
- 2001 – New Morning: The Paris Concert, DVD, (In-Akustik)
- 2002 – Blue Moon (Concord Jazz)
- 2003 – Keep on Running (Concord Jazz)
- 2007 – Truth (Concord)

=== As guest ===
- 1986 – Ancestral Voices, David Gilden (Kora Productions)
- 1992 – Heads Up, Dave Weckl (GRP)
- 1994 – Mo' Jamaca Funk, Tom Browne (Hip Bop Essence)
- 1996 – Dream Walk, Keiko Matsui (Countdown)
- 1997 – Hazardous Material, Bob Boykin (Legato)
- 1997 – Mangio Troppa Cioccolata, Giorgia Todrani (BMG)
- 1998 – Madrid, Marc Antoine (GRP)
- 2001 – Live at the Baked Potato, Vol. 2, Various artists (Tone Center)
- 2002 – Groove Suite, Sunnie Paxson (Liquid 8)
- 2002 – Bullet Proof, Bruce Conte (Severn)
- 2003 – Man @ Work, Colin Hay (Compass)
- 2004 – Live in LA, Rique Pantoja (Tratore/Net)
- 2006 – Kinesthetics, Scott Kinsey (Abstract Logix)
- 2006 – Jesus Is Magic, Sarah Silverman, film, (Interscope)
- 2007 – A Bass Bolero, Harald Weinkum (EFA)
- 2008 – Just Between Us, Clarence Spady (Severn)
- 2009 – A Gozar!, Cecilla Noël (Compass)
- 2009 – The Chick Corea Songbook, The Manhattan Transfer (Four-Quarters Entertainment)
- 2011 – Gathering Mercury, Colin Hay (Lazy Eye)
