= Love in a Peaceful World =

Single by Level 42

from the album Forever Now
- Released: 18 July 1994
- Genre: Pop
- Length: 4:17
- Label: RCA
- Songwriter(s): Phil Gould; Steve White
- Producer(s): Level 42

Level 42 singles chronology
"All Over You" (1994)	"Love in a Peaceful World" (1994)	"The Way Back Home" (2006)

"Love in a Peaceful World" is a song by English jazz-funk band Level 42, released in July 1994 by RCA Records from their final studio album of the decade, Forever Now (1994). It was written by Phil Gould and former Style Council drummer Steve White, with whom Gould had collaborated the previous year for the Style Council side project Talbot White on the United States of Mind project. The entire Level 42 band is credited as producer for the song. The song peaked at No. 31 on the UK Singles Chart, and is the last single of Level 42 to enter the charts. The music video of this song is the final video recorded by Level 42, with Jeff Baynes as director. The single was released only in the United Kingdom.

Among other latter-day compilations, the song appears on the compilation album Past Lives – The Best of the RCA Years, released in 2007 which features their greatest hit songs from 1991–1996 when the band was with RCA.

== Critical reception ==
Alan Jones from Music Week complimented the song as "a restrained ballad which is likely to follow the first two into the To 40. It has definite radio appeal, though the lack of a dance track on the flip (a device used for their last two singles) may count against it." Pan-European magazine Music & Media wrote, "M. King could of course mean Martin Luther King as well. Mr. bass guitar has a dream about love, peace and understanding too, but more focused on personal relations. A soap-box-love-ballad."

== Personnel ==
- Mark King – bass, vocals
- Mike Lindup – keyboards, vocals
- Phil Gould – drums
- Wally Badarou – keyboards
- Danny Blume – guitars

== Charts ==
Chart (1994)	Peak position
UK Singles (OCC)	31
UK Airplay (Music Week)	40
