= Forever Now (Level 42 album) =

Studio album by Level 42
- Released: 14 March 1994
- Genre: Rock, nu jazz
- Label: RCA
- Producer: Level 42, Wally Badarou, Steve Anderson

Level 42 chronology
Guaranteed (1991)	Forever Now (1994)	Retroglide (2006)

Singles from Forever Now
- 1. "Forever Now" Released: 14 February 1994; 2. "All Over You" Released: 18 April 1994; 3. "Love in a Peaceful World" Released: 18 July 1994

Alternative cover
- Resurgence cover (1996)

Professional ratings
Review scores
Source	Rating
Allmusic	3/5 stars

Forever Now is the 10th studio album released by the British pop musical group Level 42, released in March 1994. There were two releases of the album with different track-listings and cover art. The first release in 1994 on RCA Records has 11 tracks. In 1996, the album was re-issued by the label Resurgence, with 15 tracks including six additional tracks, but without the songs "Tired Of Waiting" and "All Over You". Also, some of the songs on this version varied in length from those on the RCA release, and the track "Billy's Gone" was completely remixed. The Resurgence album was re-released in 2009 by the label Edsel, as a double CD, bringing "Tired Of Waiting" and "All Over You" back to the track-listing again, and also adding extended remixes of "All Over You", "Forever Now", "Learn To Say No" and "Love In A Peaceful World". The sleeve notes for the reissue state that the Resurgence version of the album contained the original intended track- listing.

It was the final album release for Level 42 before their original break-up, and was their only album of the 90s to feature the participation of three original members: Mark King, Mike Lindup and Phil Gould. Level 42 released a new album in 2006, named Retroglide, with King, Lindup and Gary Husband and a small participation by Boon Gould. Phil Gould, dismayed at what he felt was the record company's ineptitude, did not go on the road with the band on their Forever Now tour. He was replaced for the tour with live session drummer Gavin Harrison, and Jakko Jakszyk rejoined on guitar.

Forever Now is Level 42's best album since the mid-80s heyday of World Machine and Running in the Family. After a two-album hiatus, drummer Phil Gould returned to the band on what would become its final studio release. The jazzy, horn-drenched title track is the highlight, but there are many solid cuts here, including "Learn to Say No" and the Hall & Oates sound-alike "Love in a Peaceful World"

— William Cooper, Allmusic

Three singles were issued from the album: "Forever Now", "All Over You" and "Love in a Peaceful World" - all of these reached the Top 40.

== Track listing ==
=== 1994 RCA Version ===
No.	Title	Writer(s)	Length
1.	"Forever Now"	Musker, Darbyshire, King	4:14
2.	"Model Friend"	King, Lindup, P. Gould	4:56
3.	"Tired Of Waiting"	Lindup, Badarou, Gould	4:57
4.	"All Over You"	King, Lindup, Gould	4:02
5.	"Love in a Peaceful World"	Gould, White	7:13
6.	"Romance"	King, Lindup, Gould	4:55
7.	"Billy's Gone"	King, Gould	5:24
8.	"One In A Million"	King, Lindup, Badarou, Gould	4:27
9.	"Sunbed Song"	King, Gould	5:16
10.	"Talking In Your Sleep"	King, Lindup, Gould	3:45
11.	"Don't Bother Me"	King, Gould	4:50
12.	"Past Lives" (bonus track on Japanese edition)	M.King, P.Gould	5:35
13.	"Learn to Say No" (bonus track on Japanese edition)	M.King, M.Lindup, P.Gould, P.Lorimer	4:13

=== 1996 Resurgence Version ===
No.	Title	Writer(s)	Length
1.	"Billy's Gone"	M.King, P.Gould	5:28
2.	"The Bends" (originally a b-side on the "Love In A Peaceful World" single)	M.King, M.Lindup, P.Gould	7:13
3.	"Play Me" (originally a b-side on the "Forever Now" single)	M.King, W.Badarou, P.Gould	6:09
4.	"The Sunbed Song"	M.King, P.Gould	5:24
5.	"Past Lives" (originally a b-side on the "Forever Now" single)	M.King, P.Gould	5:39
6.	"Don't Bother Me"	M.King, P.Gould	4:57
7.	"Heart On The Line (Skeletal)" (originally a b-side on the "Love In A Peaceful World" single)	M.King	4:51
8.	"Romance"	M.King, M.Lindup, P.Gould	4:59
9.	"Time Will Heal" (previously unreleased)	M.King, M.Lindup	4:08
10.	"Learn To Say No" (previously released on the Japanese edition of the original album)	M.King, M.Lindup, P.Gould, P.Lorimer	4:14
11.	"Forever Now"	M.King, Darbyshire, Musker	4:21
12.	"Model Friend"	M.King, P.Gould, M.Lindup	5:04
13.	"Love In A Peaceful World"	P.Gould, S.White	6:45
14.	"One In A Million"	M.Lindup, P.Gould, W.Badarou, M.King	4:56
15.	"Talking In Your Sleep"	M.King, P.Gould, M.Lindup	3:53

=== 2009 Edsel Version ===
Disc One
No.	Title	Writer(s)	Length
1.	"Billy's Gone"	M.King, P.Gould	5:26
2.	"The Bends"	M.King, M.Lindup, P.Gould	7:07
3.	"Play Me"	M.King, W.Badarou, P.Gould	6:04
4.	"The Sunbed Song"	M.King, P.Gould	5:20
5.	"Past Lives"	M.King, P.Gould	5:36
6.	"Don't Bother Me"	M.King, P.Gould	4:51
7.	"Heart On The Line (Skeletal)"	M.King	4:50
8.	"Romance"	M.King, M.Lindup, P.Gould	4:56
9.	"Time Will Heal"	M.King, M.Lindup	4:07
10.	"Learn To Say No"	M.King, M.Lindup, P.Gould, P.Lorimer	3:57
11.	"Forever Now"	M.King, Darbyshire, Musker	4:19
12.	"Model Friend"	M.King, P.Gould, M.Lindup	4:59
13.	"Love In A Peaceful World"	P.Gould, S.White	6:42
14.	"One In A Million"	M.Lindup, P.Gould, W.Badarou, M.King	4:22
15.	"Talking In Your Sleep"	M.King, P.Gould, M.Lindup	3:52

Disc Two
No.	Title	Writer(s)	Length
1.	"Tired of Waiting"	M.Lindup, W.Badarou, P.Gould	5:07
2.	"All Over You"	M.King, M.Lindup, P.Gould	4:01
3.	"All Over You [Pharmacy Dub]" (Originally released on the "Forever Now" CD single)	M.King, M.Lindup, P.Gould	7:31
4.	"Forever Now [Porky Rides Again Remix]" (Originally released on the "Forever Now" 12" single)	M.King, Darbyshire, Musker	7:00
5.	"All Over You [Mother Slap'n'Tickle Mix]" (Originally released on the "Forever Now" CD single)	M.King, M.Lindup, P.Gould	5:54
6.	"All Over You [K-Klass Vocal Mix]" (Originally released on the "Forever Now" CD single)	M.King, M.Lindup, P.Gould	6:58
7.	"All Over You [Mother Dub]" (Originally released on the "All Over You" CD single)	M.King, M.Lindup, P.Gould	6:36
8.	"All Over You [Full On Instrumental Mix]" (Originally released on the "Forever Now" CD single)	M.King, M.Lindup, P.Gould	6:30
9.	"Learn To Say No [K-Klass Klub Mix]" (Originally released on the "All Over You" CD single)	M.King, M.Lindup, P.Gould, P.Lorimer	7:24
10.	"Learn To Say No [Pharmacy Dub]" (Originally released on the "All Over You" CD single)	M.King, M.Lindup, P.Gould, P.Lorimer	7:05
11.	"Love In A Peaceful World [Old Skool Mix]" (Originally released on the "Love In A Peaceful World" CD single)	P.Gould, S.White	4:39
12.	"Love In A Peaceful World [Television Version]" (Originally released on the "Love In A Peaceful World" CD single)	P.Gould, S.White	4:08

== Personnel ==
Level 42

- Mark King – vocals, bass guitar, organ, loops, synths, harp
- Mike Lindup – vocals, synths, Rhodes, grand piano, Wurlitzer, Hammond XB2
- Phil Gould – vocals, acoustic piano, drums, drum loops, organ

with:

- Wally Badarou – vocals, synths, guitars, Yamaha DX7 Rhodes, Hammond XB2
- Danny Blume (Erroneously credited as "Danny Bloom") – guitars
- Miles Bould – percussion
- Mitey – voice on "All Over You"

Brass Section

- Gary Barnacle – saxophones
- John Thirkell, Derek Watkins and Stuart Brooks – trumpets
- Richard Edwards – trombone

Strings

- String arrangements on "Love In A Peaceful World' and "Romance" by Mike Lindup
- On "Romance", "Talking In Your Sleep" and Don't Bother Me: Opus 20 directed by Ann Morfee, led by Chris Tombling
- On "Love In A Peaceful World" led by Gavin Wright

== Charts ==
=== Album charts ===
Year	Chart	Peak Position
1994	UK album charts	#8

=== Single charts ===
Year	Song	Chart	Peak Position
1994	"Forever Now"	UK single charts	#19
1994	"All Over You"	UK single charts	#26
1994	"Love In A Peaceful World"	UK single charts	#31
