= Guaranteed (Level 42 album) =

Studio album by Level 42
- Released: 2 September 1991
- Recorded: 1990–1991
- Studios: The Summerhouse, Isle of Wight
- Genres: Rock, jazz-funk
- Length: 57:46
- Label: RCA
- Producers: Level 42 and Wally Badarou

Level 42 chronology
Staring at the Sun (1988)	Guaranteed (1991)	Forever Now (1994)

Singles from Guaranteed
- 1. "Guaranteed" Released: August 1991; 2. "Overtime" Released: October 1991; 3. "My Father's Shoes" Released: April 1992

Professional ratings
Review scores
Source	Rating
AllMusic	3.5/5 stars
New Musical Express	2/10
Select Magazine	3/5 stars

Guaranteed is the ninth studio album by the British musical group Level 42, released in 1991, their first album of the 1990s. The album was released by RCA records and it was the first Level 42 studio album released by a label other than Polydor.

== Overview ==
Guaranteed was the first Level 42 album without a songwriting contribution from former member Boon Gould, who had contributed lyrics to some songs for the 1988 album Staring at the Sun following his departure from the band. Several songs were co-written with lyricists Drew Barfield and George M. Green. Guaranteed was also the first Level 42 album to be released following the death of guitarist Alan Murphy, who had taken over from Gould for Staring at the Sun and related tours. It also marked their first with BMG, having departed from Polydor Records after disagreements over selecting singles from their previous studio album, Staring at the Sun. Paul Crockford, the band's manager, described Level 42's departure from Polydor as being akin to a "divorce of a happy couple" and said that they selected BMG as they were "strong internationally".

The lineup credits for the album listed all of the musicians involved rather than clearly defining the separation between band and guest players. This reflected the ongoing personnel shifts within the band. All cover art and inlay photos implied that the band consisted of Mark King, Mike Lindup and Gary Husband plus a guitarist, but it was less clear on the latter's identity — inlay photos featured Allan Holdsworth while cover artwork featured Jakko Jakszyk. In practice Holdsworth, who had played with the band during its recent London residency at the Hammersmith Apollo, provided electric guitar solos to only five of the album's songs in the studio: "Seven Years", "A Kinder Eye", "She Can't Help Herself", "If You Were Mine" and "With a Little Love". Band associate Dominic Miller contributed all rhythm guitar work, as he had done for Staring at the Sun. Jakszyk (formerly with 64 Spoons and a top session guitarist) played no part in recording the album, but was hired for touring and promotional work, was featured in the album artwork and in the promotional video clips for "Guaranteed", "Overtime" and "My Father's Shoes".

Level 42 recorded Guaranteed on the Isle of Wight at King's Summerhouse studio, with mixing being conducted at The Hit Factory in New York City. Due to Lindup's absence from many of the sessions, a high proportion of the keyboard parts for Guaranteed were played by drummer Gary Husband (including the piano solo on "Her Big Day") although Lindup would later overdub solos. Husband would also expand his songwriting contribution, including writing the song "If You Were Mine" on his own. Husband would leave Level 42 following this album, to be replaced by the band's original drummer Phil Gould, although he would return to the band in 1999.

BMG arranged their promotional efforts to target areas across Europe where Staring at the Sun had performed worse than Level 42's previous albums. In Germany, a Level 42 performance was arranged for 5 September at Funk Ausstellung in Berlin for an international trade fair, with the concert being broadcast on the country's ZDF network. This gig was part of a European promotional tour that preceded a separate string of European performances scheduled from October 1991 through the end of the year.

The album's title track reached number 17 in the UK Singles Chart in 1991 and had two versions of its music video produced. The song "A Kinder Eye" was dedicated to the memory of Frances Robblee, the mother-in-law of lyricist George M. Green.

== Track listing ==
1. "Guaranteed" (Lindup, Husband, King, Badarou) – 4:51
2. "Overtime" (Lindup, King, Barfield) – 4:47
3. "Her Big Day" (Lindup, Husband, King, Barfield, Badarou) – 5:09
4. "Seven Years" (King) – 4:42
5. "Set Me Up" (Lindup, King, Barfield) – 4:28
6. "The Ape" (King, Green) – 4:17
7. "My Father's Shoes" (Lindup, King, Green, Badarou) – 5:14
8. "A Kinder Eye" (King, Green) – 5:45
9. "She Can't Help Herself" (Lindup, King, Barfield) – 5:00
10. "If You Were Mine" (Husband) – 5:01
11. "Lasso the Moon" (Lindup, Green) – 4:02
12. "With a Little Love" (Husband, King) – 4:07

== Personnel ==
Level 42

- Mark King – vocals, bass
- Mike Lindup – vocals, keyboards
- Gary Husband – keyboards, drums, backing vocals

Additional musicians

- Wally Badarou – keyboards, backing vocals
- Dominic Miller – guitars
- Jakko Jakszyk – guitars (live)
- Allan Holdsworth – guitar solos (4, 8, 9, 10, 12)
- Gary Barnacle – saxophones
- John Thirkell – trumpets
- Annie McCaig – backing vocals

== Production ==
- Level 42 – producers, recording
- Wally Badarou – producer, recording
- Tom Lord-Alge – mixing at The Hit Factory (New York City)
- Paul Crockford – management
- Phillippa Watson – management

Front Cover Photography: Andy Earl

Insert/Inlay Photography: Patrick Eden (who photographed the band recording at Mark King’s Summerhouse Recording Studio in East Cowes, Isle of Wight)

== Charts ==
Album

Chart (1991)	Peak position
UK Albums Chart	3

Singles

Year	Song	Chart	Position
1991	"Guaranteed"	UK Singles Chart	17
1991	"Overtime"	UK Singles Chart	62
1992	"My Father's Shoes"	UK Singles Chart	55
