= Staring at the Sun (Level 42 album) =

Studio album by Level 42
- Released: 19 September 1988
- Recorded: 1988
- Studio: Studio Miraval (Correns, France)
- Genre: Pop rock
- Length: 49:41 (CD/Cassette), 43:42 (LP)
- Label: Polydor
- Producer: Wally Badarou; Level 42; Julian Mendelsohn

Level 42 chronology
Running in the Family (1987)	Staring at the Sun (1988)	Level Best (1989)

Singles from Staring at the Sun
- 1. "Heaven in My Hands" Released: 22 August 1988; 2. "Take a Look" Released: 17 October 1988; 3. "Tracie" Released: 9 January 1989

Professional ratings
Review scores
Source	Rating
AllMusic	link
Smash Hits	2/5 stars

Staring at the Sun is the eighth studio album by British jazz/funk band Level 42, released in 1988. The album includes the singles "Heaven in My Hands" (UK No. 12), "Take a Look" (UK No. 32) and "Tracie" (UK no. 25).

== Background ==
Staring at the Sun is the first Level 42 album not to feature brothers Phil Gould and Boon Gould, although Boon did write the lyrics to six of the songs. They were replaced by British guitarist Alan Murphy, who had collaborated with Go West and singer Kate Bush, and drummer Gary Husband, who had been a member of the band Morrissey–Mullen. This would be the only full-length Level 42 album on which Murphy would appear, as he died only a year after its release from complications related to HIV/AIDS, mere weeks before the release of the band's Level Best compilation, which featured his last contributions to the band on the new single "Take Care of Yourself".

== Commercial performance ==
The album was not as successful as its predecessors, again reaching the Top 5 in the UK Albums Chart but missing the top half of the Billboard 200 in the US. Internationally, it reached the Top 10 in several countries, but ultimately had a lesser impact on the charts than the band's two previous albums.

== Track listing ==
1. "Heaven in My Hands" (King, R. Gould) – 4:39
2. "I Don't Know Why" (King, R. Gould) – 4.22
3. "Take a Look" (King, R. Gould, Lindup, Badarou) – 4:41
4. "Over There" (King, Lindup) – 3:59
5. "Silence" (Lindup) – 4:56
6. "Tracie" (King, Husband) – 4:53
7. "Staring at the Sun" (King, R. Gould, Badarou) – 4:39
8. "Two Hearts Collide" (King, R. Gould) – 4:10
9. "Man" (King, R. Gould, Badarou) – 7:23
10. "Gresham Blues" ^{A} (King) – 5:43

^{A} Available on the CD and cassette only

== Personnel ==
Level 42

- Mark King – bass guitar, vocals
- Mike Lindup – keyboards, vocals
- Alan Murphy – guitars
- Gary Husband – drums

with:

- Wally Badarou – keyboards
- Dominic Miller – guitars
- Krys Mach – saxophones
- Steve Sidwell – trumpet

== Production ==
- Level 42 – producers
- Wally Badarou – producer
- Julian Mendelsohn – producer, engineer, mixing
- Jean Lamoot – assistant engineer
- Kevin Metcalfe – mastering
- The Artful Dodgers – sleeve design
- Mark Hughes – illustration
- John Stoddart – photography
- Paul Crockford – management

== Chart positions ==
=== Album ===
Year	Album	Chart	Peak position
1988	Staring at the Sun	UK Albums Chart	2
1988	Staring at the Sun	US Billboard 200	128

=== Singles ===
Year	Song	Chart	Peak position
1988	"Heaven in My Hands"	UK Singles Chart	12
1988	"Take a Look"	UK Singles Chart	32
1988	"Tracie"	UK Singles Chart	25

== Sales and certifications ==
Certifications for Staring at the Sun
Region	Certification	Certified units/sales
Canada (Music Canada)	Gold	50,000^{^}
Netherlands (NVPI)	Gold	50,000^{^}
United Kingdom (BPI)	Gold	100,000^{^}
^{^} Shipments figures based on certification alone.
