= Forever Now (Level 42 song) =

1994 single by Level 42

Single by Level 42

from the album Forever Now
- Released: 14 February 1994
- Length: 4:40
- Label: RCA
- Songwriters: Mark King; Frank Musker; Richard Darbyshire
- Producers: Mark King; Mike Lindup; Phil Gould; Steve Anderson

Level 42 singles chronology
"My Father's Shoes" (1992)	"Forever Now" (1994)	"All Over You" (1994)

"Forever Now" is a song by English jazz-funk band Level 42. It was released in February 1994, by RCA Records, as the first single from their 10th studio album, Forever Now (1994). The song is written by Mark King, Frank Musker and Richard Darbyshire, and produced by King with Mike Lindup, Phil Gould and Steve Anderson. It reached number 19 on the UK Singles Chart and charted in four other countries.

== Personnel ==
- Mark King – bass, vocals
- Mike Lindup – keyboards, vocals
- Phil Gould – drums
- Wally Badarou – keyboards
- Danny Blume – guitars
- Gary Barnacle – saxophones
- John Thirkell, Derek Watkins, Stuart Brooks – trumpets
- Richard Edwards – trombone

== Charts ==
Chart (1994)	Peak position
Europe (European Hit Radio)	5
Germany (GfK)	51
Iceland (Íslenski Listinn Topp 40)	22
Netherlands (Dutch Top 40)	31
Netherlands (Single Top 100)	25
UK Singles (OCC)	19
UK Airplay (Music Week)	5
