= Retroglide (album) =

Studio album by Level 42
- Released: 18 September 2006
- Recorded: 2004–2005
- Genre: Rock
- Label: W14/Universal Music Group
- Producer: Mark King; Level 42

Level 42 chronology
The Definitive Collection (2006)	Retroglide (2006)	Past Lives – The Best of the RCA Years (2007)

Professional ratings
Review scores
Source	Rating
AllMusic	2/5 stars

Retroglide is the eleventh studio album by the English jazz-funk band Level 42. It was released 12 years after their previous album and reached the UK Top 80. It is a mix of electronica with Level 42's traditional blend of funk and pop. The album is notable for featuring songs written by Boon Gould, the band's original guitarist (whose guitar is featured on "Ship") and bassist/vocalist Mark King.

The album cover was designed by Alan Brooks who previously created the sleeves for the 1983 singles of "The Chinese Way" and "Out of Sight, Out of Mind". The sleeve depicts a futuristic updated version of the band's Princess logo, who was first pictured on Level 42's self-titled debut album in 1981, which although not credited was inspired by the figure of Maria of the 1927 film, Metropolis.

== Track listing ==
All tracks are written by Mark King and Boon Gould.

No.	Title	Length
1.	"Dive into the Sun"	4:03
2.	"Rooted"	5:31
3.	"The Way Back Home"	6:55
4.	"Just for You"	4:49
5.	"Sleep Talking"	5:01
6.	"Retroglide"	4:47
7.	"All Around"	4:58
8.	"Clouds"	4:32
9.	"Hell Town Story"	4:55
10.	"Ship" (feat. Boon Gould)	5:09
11.	"All I Need" (UK bonus track)	4:00
Total length:		54:40

== Digital downloads ==
- "The Way Back Home" (radio edit)

== Personnel ==
- Mark King – bass guitar, percussion, guitars, vocals
- Nathan King – guitars, vocals
- Gary Husband – drums
- Sean Freeman – saxes
- Lyndon Connah – keyboards
- Mike Lindup – EVP88 keyboards, vocals
- Boon Gould – guitar solo on "Ship"
