= Alan Murphy =

British musician (1953–1989)

- Born: 18 November 1953
- Origin: Islington, London, England
- Died: 19 October 1989 (aged 35) Westminster City Hospital, London
- Genres: Rock; fusion
- Occupation: Musician
- Instrument: Guitar
- Years active: 1975–1989
- Labels: Polydor; EMI; Chrysalis
- Formerly of: Level 42; Fusion Orchestra; Scritti Politti; Go West; SFX

Alan Murphy (18 November 1953 – 19 October 1989) was an English rock session guitarist who worked with Kate Bush and Go West. In 1988, he joined the jazz-funk band Level 42 as a full-time band member, and played with them until his death from AIDs-related pneumonia in 1989. He also played lead guitar on select recordings by Mike and the Mechanics, including the hit single "Silent Running (On Dangerous Ground)".

== Career ==
Murphy's first musical group was called Blackmass and consisted of Murphy, Roy Phillips, James Hedges, Terry Eden, Steve Paget, and Vincent Duffy. Blackmass were named in tribute to Deep Purple guitarist Ritchie Blackmore, an early influence of Murphy's, and existed for about two years until some of the band's equipment was stolen and the group disbanded.

SFX was an instrumental jazz-rock fusion band featuring Murphy and fellow session musicians Felix Krish on bass, Tony Beard on drums and Richard Cottle on keyboards. SFX originated from the covers band "The Stapleton Allstars", morphing into SFX after creating a set of original instrumental fusion tunes. They played the occasional interrupted residency at the Cricketers pub, near The Oval cricket ground. The band recorded an album which was subsequently released after Murphy's death.

Murphy performed with Fusion Orchestra for the better part of 1975. In 1982, he handled on-stage guitar duties for London-based new wave vocalist Zaine Griff (originally from New Zealand). In 1984, Murphy worked on the album Cold in a Warm Climate with the band Paparazzi, becoming a member in preparation for a major European tour. When Paparazzi unexpectedly dissolved over internal disagreements and managerial problems, Murphy was recruited to play on the debut album of Go West in 1985, shortly thereafter becoming an official member.

Murphy was enlisted to support Kate Bush on The Tour of Life, which took in Europe and the UK in 1979. Both a live video and EP were released with material taken from this tour. He also contributed to her albums Never for Ever (1980), The Dreaming (1982), Hounds of Love (1985), The Sensual World (1989), and the single "Rocket Man".

In 1988, Murphy was asked to replace Level 42 guitarist Boon Gould, and recorded with the band on their album Staring at the Sun (1988). A live album was recorded during this period, Live at Wembley. This was one of the last major projects that Murphy worked on before his death.

Murphy was a session man who worked with Rod Stewart on the Atlantic Crossing Tour in 1976, David Bowie, Ace on their No. 1 hit "How Long", Nick Heyward, Long John Baldry, Joan Armatrading, Mike and the Mechanics, Amii Stewart, Andrew Caine, Eikichi Yazawa, Scritti Politti, So, Iain Williams and Miquel Brown. Alan also shared a writing partnership with his distant cousin Michael Finbarr Murphy, who wrote and played guitar for Heatwave, Central Line and Diana Ross.

== Death ==
During 1989, Murphy played at the British Music Fair. He performed "Heaven in My Hands" and "Lessons in Love" at the Prince's Trust Rock Gala, a charity event held at the NEC in Birmingham on 19 July 1989. On 19 October 1989, weakened by the AIDS virus, Murphy died of pneumonia in Westminster Hospital at the age of 35. He had kept the facts of his illness a secret even from his colleagues and fellow band members; according to Level 42 bassist Mark King, the band knew that Murphy was gay and his death was a 'dreadful loss'.

== Legacy ==
In the music video for Kate Bush's version of "Rocket Man", released as part of the 1991 tribute album Two Rooms: Celebrating the Songs of Elton John & Bernie Taupin, she performs with her band but there is an empty chair, a guitar and a candle where Murphy would have been, and cross-faded footage of him playing in the closing choruses. 'This is one of the last tracks that he did with us,' Bush told BBC Radio 1, 'and it's particularly nice for me to feel that it's not only keeping him alive, but I know he would be really thrilled to know that [the single] was doing so well. And it's nice for all of us that loved Al to know that he can be a part of this now.'

Bush's song "Moments of Pleasure" referenced Murphy and several other people dear to her who had died.

== Discography ==
- Kate Bush – Never for Ever (1980)
- Kate Bush – The Dreaming (1982)
- Chris Rea – Chris Rea (1982)
- Go West – Go West (1985)
- Scritti Politti – Cupid & Psyche 85 (1985)
- Go West – Bangs & Crashes (1986)
- Joan Armatrading – Secret Secrets (1985)
- Kate Bush – Hounds of Love (1985)
- Mike and the Mechanics – Mike + The Mechanics (1985)
- Nick Heyward – Warning Sign (1986)
- Go West – Dancing on the Couch (1987)
- Level 42 – Staring at the Sun (1988)
- Mike and the Mechanics – Living Years (1988)
- Kate Bush – The Sensual World (1989)
- SFX – SFX featuring Alan Murphy (1993)
- Level 42 – Live at Wembley (1996)
