= Gary Husband =

British jazz and rock musician

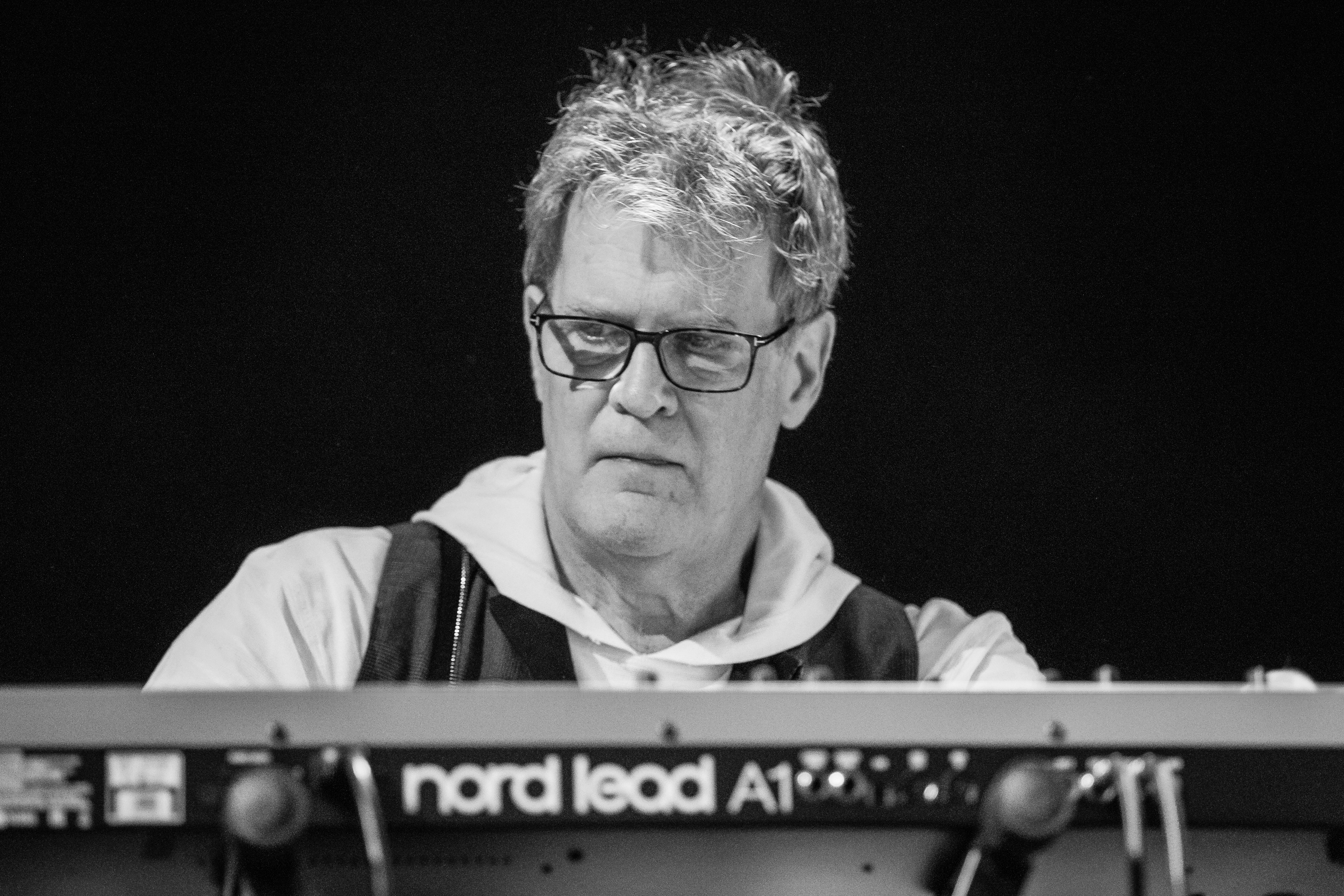
- Husband in 2024

Background information
- Born: 14 June 1960 (age 66)
- Origin: Leeds, West Yorkshire, England
- Genres: Jazz; jazz fusion; classical; rock; progressive rock; blues; pop
- Occupation: Musician
- Instruments: Drums; piano; keyboards
- Years active: 1970s–present
- Labels: Moonjune; Abstract Logix
- Website: garyhusband.com

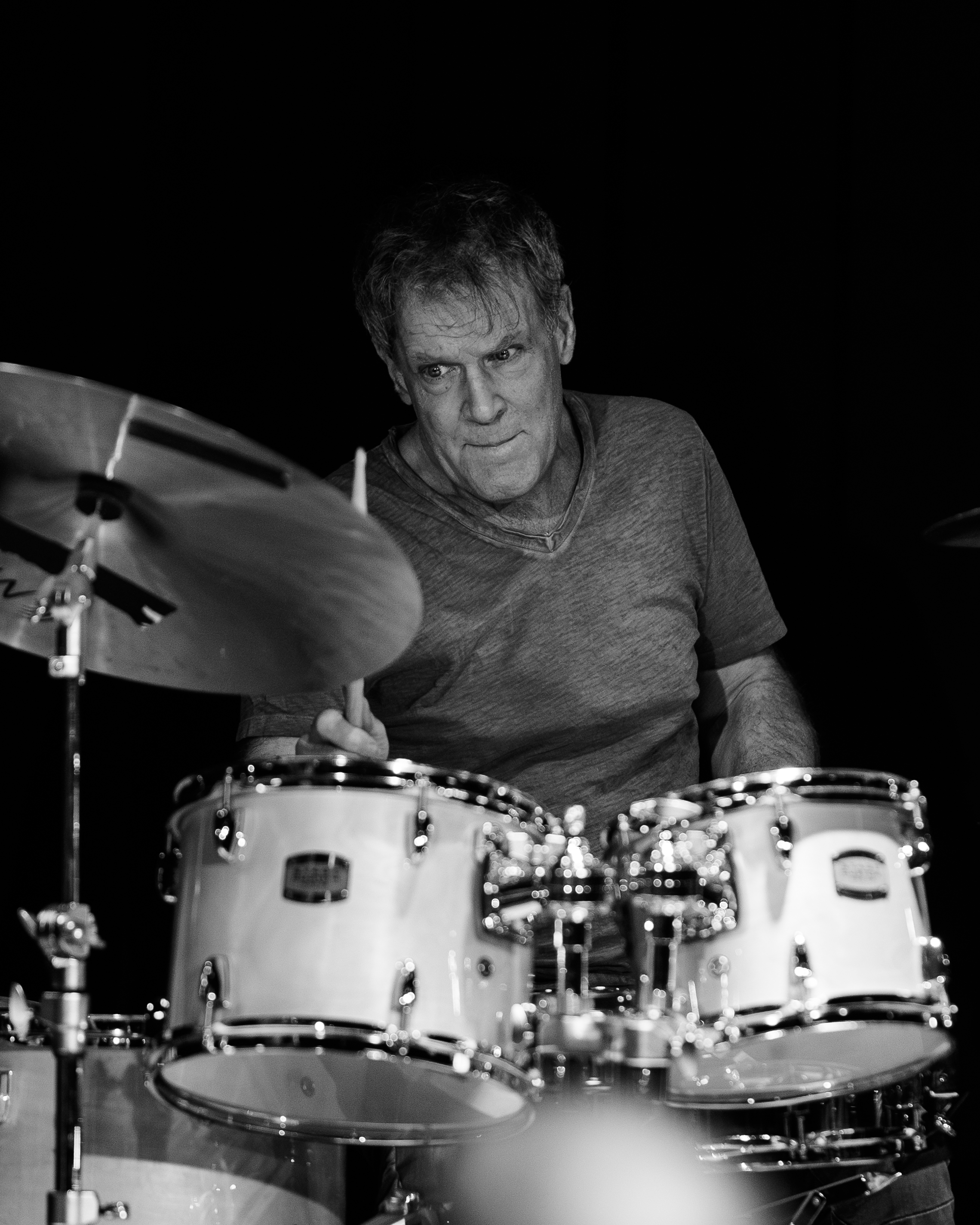
Husband on stage with Petter Wettre, Hans Mathisen, Per Mathisen in 2026

Gary Husband (born 14 June 1960) is an English jazz and rock drummer, pianist, keyboard player and bandleader. He is also a composer, arranger, producer and educator.

Husband was a member for 16 years of John McLaughlin's group The 4th Dimension. He has recently been working with Bill Evans All-Star Vans Band, Robben Ford Dragon Tales band, and his duet with guitarist Nguyên Lê. He has been a member of many of Billy Cobham's bands, worked alongside guitarist Allan Holdsworth for over three decades, the British pop/funk band Level 42, various lineups led by Jack Bruce and two lineups of guitarist Gary Moore’s groups. As a session musician, Husband has also performed, recorded or toured with Chick Corea, Jeff Beck, Robin Trower, Jan Gunnar Hoff, Per Mathisen, Lenny White, Randy Brecker, Soft Machine Legacy, Foley, Al Jarreau, Hessischer Rundfunk Big Band, George Martin, Quincy Jones, Andy Summers, UK, Mike Stern, Dewa Budjana, Jack DeJohnette, Tony Levin, Lincoln Goines, Jimmy Haslip, bassist/composer Antoine Fafard, John Patitucci, Dave Weckl, Robben Ford and works regularly with Germany's Norddeutscher Rundfunk Big Band.

Husband is currently working on his newly formed own new group Gary Husband & The Orbital Band and a solo performance project entitled ONE.

== Early years and career beginnings ==
Born in Leeds, West Yorkshire, England, to dancer Patricia Husband and musician Peter Husband, Gary Husband trained as a classical pianist with Dame Fanny Waterman DBE and Bryan Layton. His distinct piano style has been noted to reveal jazz fusion and classical music influences. While being an internationally respected drummer, he is essentially self-taught, though he picked up casual lessons with various professional players at a young age and later spent a lengthier term with drum teacher Geoff Myers.

Having been a professional player on drums and piano from the age of 13 Gary Husband joined The Syd Lawrence Orchestra at 16 years old as their full-time drummer. In addition to this he picked up session or touring work with artists or acts such as Lulu and The Bachelors among many others. Husband also frequently played in his home town with visiting jazz soloists from London in pubs and music venues.

Upon a move to London at the age of 18, Husband held either the piano or drums chair in groups such as Mike Carr Trio, Barbara Thompson's Paraphernalia, Gary Boyle Trio, the Morrissey–Mullen band, Jeff Clyne's Turning Point, occasionally recording with the BBC Big Band and frequently picking up freelance work performing at Ronnie Scott's Jazz Club.

== Solo career ==
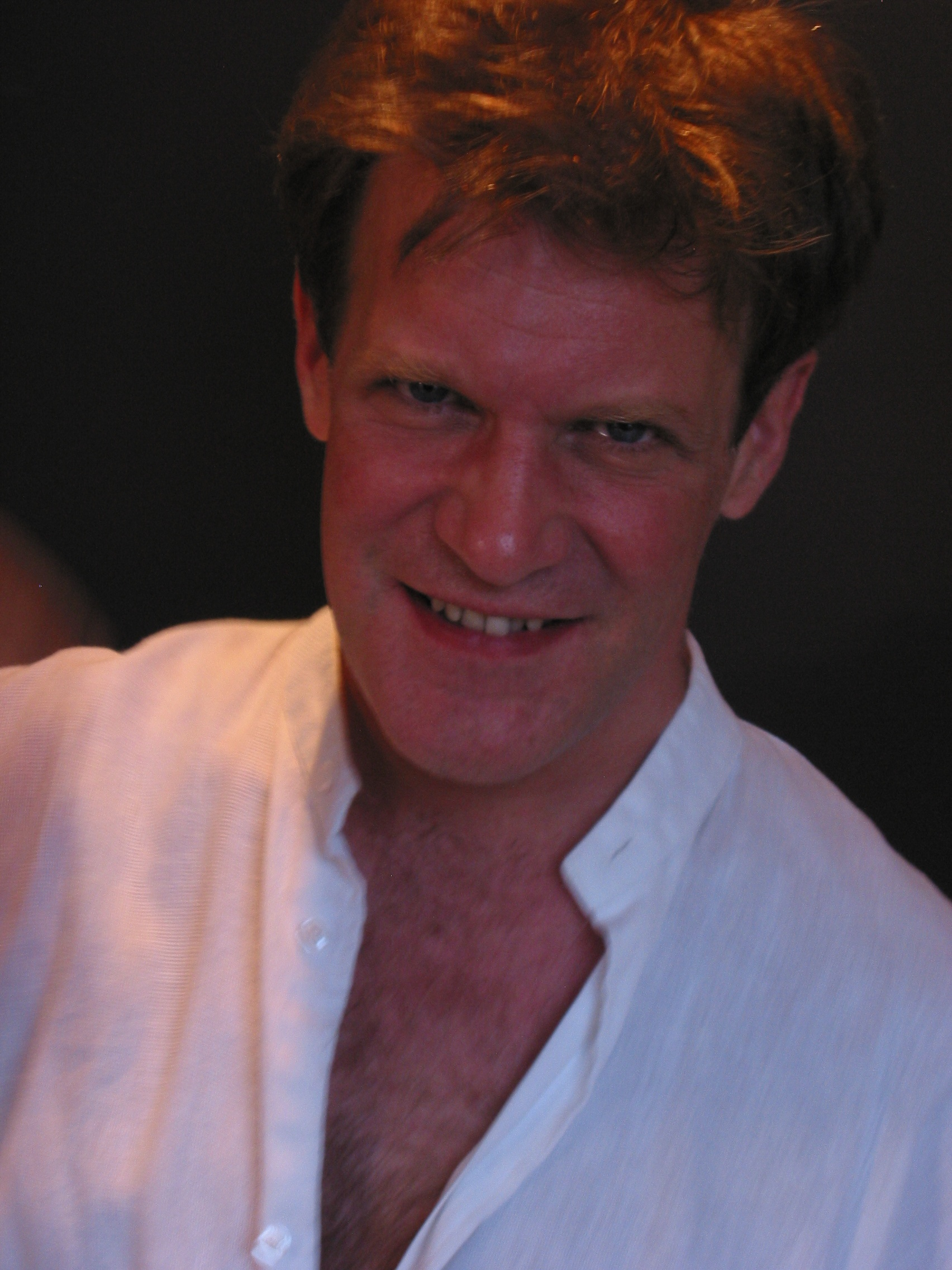
Portrait

In 1998, Husband released his first (solo synth) album, Diary Of A Plastic Box (later to be re-released as a double CD in 2008, entitled The Complete Diary Of A Plastic Box), From 1998 to 2001 he led his piano trio (The New Gary Husband Trio) featuring bassist Mick Hutton and drummer Gene Calderazzo. The trio's CD releases From The Heart and Aspire (featuring guest appearances by Billy Cobham, vocalists Mark King (musician), Christine Tobin and Hamish Stuart), highlight the music of this group. Of his several solo piano album releases, The Things I See * Interpretations Of The Music Of Allan Holdsworth is an imaginative reworking of the guitarist's music. Years later he released A Meeting Of Spirits, presenting a further selection of similarly highly personalised works based on the music of John McLaughlin.

Gary Husband's Force Majeure, his group from 2004 to 2005, featured Mahavishnu Orchestra electric violinist Jerry Goodman, trumpeter Randy Brecker, trombonist Elliot Mason, keyboard player Jim Beard, bassist Matthew Garrison and percussionist Arto Tuncboyaciyan. In 2004 the group won funding from the Contemporary Music Network and BBC Radio 3's Jazz On 3 to tour the UK. The DVD release Gary Husband's Force Majeure - Live At The Queen Elizabeth Hall, London captured the band's London performance from their debut tour. His next jazz quartet project, Gary Husband's Drive featured saxophonist Julian Siegel, trumpeter Richard Turner and bassist Michael Janisch. Husband released their debut album Hotwired in 2009 and the group disbanded in early 2010.

Among his next projects was Dirty & Beautiful, an album release in two volumes featuring performances from himself together with many of his friends and musical collaborators, past and present. Guitarists Allan Holdsworth, Neil Taylor (guitarist), Steve Topping, John McLaughlin, Wayne Krantz, Robin Trower, Ray Russell, Steve Hackett, Mike Stern, Alex Machacek and Jimmy Herring appear, along with bassists Jimmy Johnson, Mark King, Laurence Cottle, and keyboardist Jan Hammer.

Husband produced a piano and electric guitar duet album with Alex Machacek in 2013 for Abstractlogix entitled NOW.

In July 2013, Gary Husband performed a solo piano concert at the Saint-Émilion Jazz Festival.

In May 2017, Husband took his first big band production ("Dreams In Blue") to the Norddeutscher Rundfunk Big Band. Consisting of mostly his own material Husband enlisted composer and arranger Dale Wilson to prepare and interpret the scores, while Tim Hagans was brought in to direct the band. The production featured Husband playing both piano and drums. Gary also integrated special guest (Hungarian violinist) Zoltán Lantos for the debut concert performance in Hamburg.

On May 19, 2019, Husband collaborated on piano with guitarist Mark Wingfield to make the album Mark Wingfield & Gary Husband - Tor & Vale, and on March 3, 2020, he combined with Markus Reuter in Tokyo to record Gary Husband & Markus Reuter - Music Of Our Times. Both albums were released on Moonjune Records.

Husband brought about The Trackers (which he led in collaboration with Norwegian guitarist & composer Alf Terje Hana) in 2020. Their debut album Vaudeville 8:45 was recorded in 2021 (at that point still without a resident bassist) so Husband enlisted a roster of seven special guest bassists to perform on the recording. Bassists Etienne MBappé, Guy Pratt, Jimmy Haslip, Jimmy Johnson, Øyvind Grong, Mark King (musician) and Kevin Scott all feature throughout the album.

In January 2023 Husband teamed with esteemed French and Vietnamese guitarist and composer Nguyên Lê to form Nguyên Lê & Gary Husband duo. Their debut performance was commissioned by and took place at Le Petit Duc, Aix-en-Provence in January 2023 and the pair have staged many jazz festival appearances throughout Europe ever since. In June 2023 the duet performed at Hammersmith Eventim Apollo in London as support act for the two final concerts ever to be given in the city by John McLaughlin & Shakti (band).

In August 2023 Husband played a two night run at Hollywood's legendary The Baked Potato as Gary Husband & Friends. On the first he featured guests guitarist Michael Landau and Jimmy Johnson, on the second guitarists Andy Timmons, Jimmy Johnson and Rocco Zifarelli.

In 2024 Husband completed recording both drums, keyboards and co-production for the album Morgan|Husband|Feraud - A Soul In Time with guitarist and composer James Morgan and bassist Hadrien Feraud. It was a project initialised by guitarist and composer Dean Brown.

In July and August 2025 Husband led a trio from piano for a two week residency at Copenhagen’s jazz venue Epicurus. The trio featured Felix Pastorius playing bass and David “Fingers” Haynes on drums.

In September 2025 Gary Husband recorded an album (playing piano) for guitarist and composer William Lenihan along with bassist John Patitucci and drummer Dave Weckl.

Husband has released his 2025 album Postcards From The Past and has formed a new band which he leads from drums entitled Gary Husband & the Orbital Band featuring guitarist Rocco Zifarelli, keyboardist player Tom Cawley and bassist Felix Pastorius.

== Acknowledgements ==
Gary Husband's proficiency on both drums and keyboards has received praise from other musicians and critics. In 2017, Gavin Harrison of Porcupine Tree referred to him as "a great, amazingly talented musician! ... He's off the charts talented, this guy. I don't know anyone else in the world who can play piano at that level, and drums at that level". Music critic John Fordham of The Guardian considers him one of the best British musicians in the contemporary post-bop scene, describing Husband's pianistic style as "an onrush of long-lined phrases and ambiguous harmonies boldly adapted from Herbie Hancock and Bill Evans."

In 2011, when asked to recommend modern drummers to a drumming magazine, Bill Bruford of King Crimson mentioned Gary Husband, stating that "anything Gary plays on is great" and concluding that he is among the "players [who] are helping push the boundaries of how things should be." Pat Mastelotto said that Husband is an "inspiration to every drummer." Other drummers who have cited him as an influence or expressed admiration for his drumming work are Tomas Haake of Meshuggah. Sean Reinert of Cynic, Peter Wildoer of Darkane, and Rick Colaluca of Watchtower.

On July 4, 2023, Gary Husband won the “Jazz Instrumentalist of the Year” award at the (APPJAG) Parliamentary Jazz Awards 2023.

== Selected discography ==
=== Solo album releases ===
- (1998) Diary of a Plastic Box
- (1998) Steve Topping, Gary Husband and Paul Carmichael - What It Is (Live in the studio circa 1980)
- (1999) The New Gary Husband Trio: From the Heart
- (2004) Gary Husband & Friends: Aspire
- (2004) The Things I See - Interpretations of the Music of Allan Holdsworth
- (2006) A Meeting of Spirits - Interpretations of the Music of John McLaughlin
- (2008) The Complete Diary of a Plastic Box
- (2009) Gary Husband's Drive - Hotwired
- (2009) Tryptych. Shulgin's Songbook. Part II - Gary Husband Plays Alexander Shulgin
- (2010) Dirty & Beautiful Vol 1
- (2012) Dirty & Beautiful Vol 2
- (2013) Gary Husband and Alex Machacek: NOW
- (2013) Alexander Shulgin's Diptych Skazka. Part 2. Skazka for boys
- (2014) Dirty & Beautiful Vol 1 Remix Edition
- (2019) Mark Wingfield and Gary Husband - Tor & Vale
- (2020) Gary Husband and Markus Reuter - Music of our Times
- (2020) Gary Husband's Drive - Live In London
- (2020) Gary Husband's Force Majeure - Highlights From Tour In 2004
- (2020) Martin Krampl and Gary Husband - Mountains To Climb (Still)
- (2022) Gary Husband & Alf Terje Hana - The Trackers - Vaudeville 8:45
- (2024) Songs of Love and Solace
- (2024) Morgan|Husband|Feraud - A Soul In Time
- (2025) Postcards From The Past

=== Solo singles releases ===
- (2019) Greb//Husband - Benny Greb & Gary Husband collaboration

=== Solo DVD/video releases ===
- (1997) Gary Husband - Interplay & Improvisation On The Drums - VHS VIDEO
- (2003) Gary Husband & The Mondesir Brothers - To The Power Of Three - DVD
- (2005) Gary Husband's Force Majeure - Live At The Queen Elizabeth Hall, London - DVD

=== Album releases with others ===
- (1982) Allan Holdsworth I.O.U.
- (1985) Allan Holdsworth - Metal Fatigue
- (1986) Allan Holdsworth - Atavachron
- (1987) Allan Holdsworth - Sand
- (1988) Level 42 - Staring at the Sun
- (1989) Allan Holdsworth - Secrets
- (1989) Level 42 - Live At Wembley
- (1991) Level 42 - Guaranteed
- (1991) Chris White - Shadowdance
- (1992) Allan Holdsworth - Wardenclyffe Tower
- (1993) Jack Bruce - Cities of the Heart
- (1994) Allan Holdsworth - Hard Hat Area
- (1994) Billy Cobham - The Traveler
- (1994) Gary Moore - Ballads & Blues 1982–1994
- (1996) Jimmy Nail - Crocodile Shoes 2
- (1996) Juicy Lucy - Blue Thunder
- (1996) Gongzilla - Thrive
- (1997) Steve Topping - Time & Distance
- (1997) Gary Moore - Dark Days in Paradise
- (1997) Brian Houston - Good News Junkie
- (1997) Jack Bruce - Sitting On Top Of The World
- (1998) Billy Cobham - Focused
- (1999) Gary Moore - A Different Beat
- (1999) Iwan Van Hetten - Time
- (1999) Jimmy Nail - Tadpoles In A Jar
- (1999) Anthony Hindson & Friends - It's A Curious Life
- (1999) Mark King Group - Live at the Jazz Cafe
- (2000) Grupo Mark King - Live on the Isle Of Wight 2000
- (2000) Lemon D - Two Techniques
- (2001) Renato D'Aiello Euro All Stars - Introducing
- (2001) Billy Cobham - Many Years BC
- (2001) Jim Mullen - Live In Glasgow
- (2001) Level 42 - Live at Reading 2001
- (2002) Billy Cobham - Culture Mix
- (2003) Level 42 - Live at the Apollo
- (2004) Allan Holdsworth Group Live - Then!
- (2004) Steve Topping - Late Flower
- (2004) Mo Foster - Southern Reunion
- (2004) Jazz Outreach Project - Digital Directions
- (2005) Jason Smith - Think Like This
- (2006) Ray Russell - Goodbye Svengali
- (2006) Jason Smith - Tipping Point
- (2006) Level 42 - Retroglide
- (2006) John McLaughlin - Industrial Zen
- (2006) Level 42 - The Retroglide Tour
- (2007) Christof Lauer - Blues In Mind
- (2007) Jack Bruce, Robin Trower - Seven Moons
- (2008) Asaf Sirkis Trio - The Monk
- (2009) Level 42 - Live in Holland 2009
- (2010) John McLaughlin & The 4th Dimension - To the One
- (2012) John McLaughlin & The 4th Dimension - Now Here This
- (2012) Mark King & Friends - Live in Soho, London 2012
- (2013) SelKA, Aydin Esen - Transformation
- (2013) Ray Russell - Now, More Than Ever
- (2013) Various Artists - London Standard Time
- (2013) Billy Cobham - Compass Point
- (2014) Marcelo Paganini - 2012 Space Traffic Jam
- (2014) Billy Cobham - Tales from the Skeleton Coast
- (2014) Dewa Budjana - Surya Namaskar
- (2014) John McLaughlin & The 4th Dimension - The Boston Record
- (2014) Peter Fernandes - Q.E.D.
- (2014) Nguyên Lê with Michael Gibbs & NDR Bigband - celebrating The Dark Side Of The Moon
- (2014) Antoine Fafard - Ad Perpetuum
- (2014) NDR Bigband - Tall Tales of Jasper County (The Double Doubles Suite). Music by Dale Wilson
- (2014) Janek Gwizdala - Motion Picture
- (2015) Billy Cobham - Spectrum 40 Live
- (2015) Olga Konkova Trio - The Goldilocks Zone
- (2015) John McLaughlin - Black Light
- (2016) Beledo - Dreamland Mechanism
- (2016) Dean Brown - Rolajafufu
- (2016) Antoine Fafard - Sphere
- (2016) Dewa Budjana - Zentuary
- (2016) Sebastiaan Cornelissen - Spirit vs. Origin
- (2016) Athana - Invisible Colors
- (2017) John McLaughlin & The 4th Dimension - Live At Ronnie Scott's
- (2018) Oytun Ersan - Fusiolicious
- (2018) John McLaughlin & The 4th Dimension / Jimmy Herring & The Invisible Whip - Live In San Francisco
- (2018) Felix Behrendt, Stefan Böttcher, NDR Bigband - Cinephonie Noir
- (2019) Antoine Fafard - Borromean Odyssey
- (2019) Per Mathisen / Ulf Wakenius / Gary Husband - Sounds Of 3 (Edition 2)
- (2020) Dusan Jevtovic - If You See Me
- (2020) Quentin Collins All Star Quintet - A Day In The Life
- (2020) Markus Strothmann - Emerald
- (2020) Allan Holdsworth - Frankfurt ‘86
- (2020) Stick Men featuring Gary Husband - Owari
- (2020) Roman Miroshnichenko - The Sixth Sense
- (2021) Steve Hunt - Connections
- (2021) Dewa Budjana - Naurora
- (2021) Asaf Sirkis - Solar Flash
- (2021) John McLaughlin - Liberation Time
- (2021) Purbayan Chatterjee - Unbounded (Abaad)
- (2021) Olga Konkova Trio - Open Secret
- (2022) Pablo Held - Meet Me At The Loft (Live)
- (2022) John McLaughlin - The Montreux Years
- (2022) Jan Rivera - Existential Paranoia
- (2022) Spandrel (featuring Phil Hirschi, Spencer Smith & Gary Husband) - Spandrel
- (2022) Per Mathisen, Hans Mathisen, Petter Wettre, Gary Husband - More Secrets
- (2023) The Laconic - Amor Fati
- (2023) Garden Of Bliss - Athana
- (2024) Louise Patricia Crane - Netherworld
- (2024) Mark Wingfield - The Gathering
- (2024) Steve Hunt/Tim Miller - Changes
- (2024) Tony Levin - Bringing It Down To The Bass
- (2024) The Laconic - Ascension
- (2025) Jan Gunnar Hoff Group - Voyage
- (2025) Antoine Fafard - Quadra Spherium
- (2025) John McLaughlin & The 4th Dimension - Montreux Jazz Festival 2022
- (2025) The Nomads - New Beginnings
- (2025) John McLaughlin - Music For Abandoned Heights
- (2026) Robben Ford - Two Shades Of Blue
- (2026) Billy Cobham’s Time Machine - Times Of My Life

=== DVD/video releases with others ===
- (1989) Level 42 - Fait Accompli - VHS
- (1989) Level 42 - Level Best - VHS
- (1989) Various Artists - The Prince's Trust Rock Gala 1989 - VHS
- (2000) Grupo Mark King - Live on the Isle Of Wight 2000 - DVD
- (2001) Level 42 - Live At Reading Hall 2001 - DVD
- (2002) Mark King – In Concert Ohne Filter Musik Pur (Live Baden Baden 1999) - DVD
- (2004) Gary Moore & The Midnight Blues Band - Live In Montreux 1990 - DVD
- (2004) Level 42 - Live At The Apollo, London 2003 - DVD
- (2005) Gongzilla - Live In Concert & The East Village Studio - DVD
- (2006) Level 42 - Retroglide Tour 2006 - DVD
- (2007) Eric Clapton Crossroads Guitar Festival 2007 - (John McLaughlin Band, also featuring Matthew Garrison and Vinnie Colaiuta) - DVD
- (2008) Triptych - Shulgin's Songbook - DVD
- (2009) John McLaughlin & The 4th Dimension - Live @ Belgrade - DVD
- (2009) Level 42 - Live in Holland 2009 - DVD
- (2009) Jack Bruce & Robin Trower - Seven Moons Live - DVD
- (2013) Level 42 - Live at the Town and Country Club 1992 - DVD
- (2020) Allan Holdsworth - Frankfurt ‘86 - DVD
- (2022) Allan Holdsworth - Jarasum International Jazz Festival 2014 - DVD
