= Catalogue (Moloko album) =

Greatest hits album by Moloko
- Released: 17 July 2006
- Recorded: 1995–2002
- Length: 57:58
- Label: Echo
- Producer: Moloko

Moloko chronology
11,000 Clicks (2004)	Catalogue (2006)

Catalogue is a greatest hits album by English-Irish electronic music duo Moloko. It was released on 17 July 2006 by The Echo Label. Spanning two discs, Catalogue contains Moloko's singles and a track exclusive to this compilation, "Bankrupt Emotionally". The second disc contains a live recording of a concert recorded in 2003 at Brixton Academy, at the end of the band's eight-month tour performed that year. The US version does not contain the second disc. For US listeners, this was their first time hearing most of the songs on this album, as aside from the entirety of the first album (which was released as part of the electronica hype of the late 90s and because of "Fun for Me"'s inclusion on the Batman & Robin soundtrack) and "Sing it Back," the only other Moloko track released in the US was "Indigo" on the Mystery Men soundtrack.

Catalogue also includes a bonus disc in three different exclusive versions as digital downloads, one each for iTunes, Napster and MSN. These exclusive downloads consist of live versions, remixes of Moloko tracks and B-sides.

In 2009, the album was awarded a silver certification from the Independent Music Companies Association, indicating sales in excess of 30,000 copies throughout Europe.

== Track listing ==
All tracks are written by Róisín Murphy and Mark Brydon.

Disc one
No.	Title	Original album	Length
1.	"The Time Is Now" (Radio edit)	Things to Make and Do (2000)	3:42
2.	"Sing It Back" (Boris Musical Mix edit)	Things to Make and Do	4:39
3.	"Fun for Me" (Radio edit)	Do You Like My Tight Sweater? (1995)	3:47
4.	"Familiar Feeling" (Radio edit)	Statues (2003)	3:43
5.	"Pure Pleasure Seeker"	Things to Make and Do	6:31
6.	"Cannot Contain This" (Radio edit)	Statues	3:36
7.	"Bankrupt Emotionally"	Previously unreleased	4:26
8.	"Day for Night" (Radio edit)	Do You Like My Tight Sweater?	3:43
9.	"Indigo" (Radio edit)	Things to Make and Do	3:07
10.	"The Flipside" (Radio edit)	I Am Not a Doctor (1998)	3:47
11.	"Where Is the What if the What Is in Why?"	Do You Like My Tight Sweater?	4:14
12.	"Forever More"	Statues	7:22
13.	"Statues"	Statues	5:21

=== Disc two ("Value-Pak" edition only) ===
1. "Familiar Feeling" (Live at Brixton Academy)
2. "Absent Minded Friends" (Live at Brixton Academy)
3. "Day for Night" (Live at Brixton Academy)
4. "Fun for Me" (Live at Brixton Academy)
5. "Where Is the What if the What is in Why?" (Live at Brixton Academy)
6. "Cannot Contain This" (Live at Brixton Academy)
7. "Pure Pleasure Seeker" (Live at Brixton Academy)
8. "The Time Is Now" (Live at Brixton Academy)
9. "Forever More" (Live at Brixton Academy)
10. "Sing It Back" (Live at Brixton Academy)
11. "Indigo" (Live at Brixton Academy)

=== iTunes exclusive ===
1. "I Want You" (Live)
2. "100%" (Live)
3. "Blow X Blow" (Live)
4. "Come On" (Live)
5. "Being Is Bewildering" (Live)
6. "Pure Pleasure Seeker" (Pleasure & Stripped Disco Mix)
7. "Knee Deepen" (Quartermaster Again Mix)
8. "The Time Is Now" (Fk Blissed Out Dub)
9. "Familiar Feeling" (Martin Buttrich Remix)
10. "Forever More" (Pedal Freak Mix)
11. "The Time Is Now" (Donny One Leg's Two Step)
12. "Lotus Eaters" (Fila Brazillia Mix 1)
13. "Sing It Back" (Tee's Freeze Mix)

=== Napster exclusive ===
1. "Sing It Back" (Mousse T.'s Feel Love Mix)
2. "The Flipside" (Herbert's Surround Sound)
3. "Dominoid" (Panty Sniffer Mix)
4. "Indigo" (GusGus Mix)
5. "Lotus Eaters" (Funk In Your Neighbourhood Mix)
6. "The Time Is Now" (Can 7 Soulfood Mix)
7. "Fun for Me" (DJ Plankton's Pondlife Mix)
8. "Pure Pleasure Seeker" (Oscar G Cuba-Libra Dub)
9. "Forever More" (FKEK Vocal Mix)
10. "Familiar Feeling" (DJ Plankton's Country Slice Remix)
11. "Sing It Back" (Can 7 1930s Mix)
12. "Party Weirdo" (Wackdown Mix)
13. "Where Is the What if the What Is in Why?" (Wonderbook Mix)

=== MSN exclusive ===
1. "The Time Is Now" (DJ Plankton Mix)
2. "Sing It Back" (Chez Maurice Mix)
3. "Fe Fi Fungle Fool" (Tadpole Dub)
4. "Familiar Feeling" (Doctor Rockit Comes Close Mix)
5. "Pure Pleasure Seeker" (Pleasure For Life UK Vocal)
6. "Cannot Contain This" (Slapper's Delight Mix)
7. "Take My Hand"
8. "Day for Night" (Quarter Master Mix)
9. "Indigo" (Damn! Colostomy Jam! - All Seeing I Mix)
10. "The Flipside" (Swag Numbskull Vocal)
11. "Where Is the What if the What Is in Why?" (Wondervox Mix)
12. "Forever More" (Herbert's Nobody Dub)

== Charts ==
Chart (2006)	Peak position
Australian Albums (ARIA)	142
Belgian Albums (Ultratop Flanders)	7
Belgian Albums (Ultratop Wallonia)	77
Dutch Albums (Album Top 100)	65
German Albums (Offizielle Top 100)	98
Irish Albums (IRMA)	70
UK Albums (OCC)	82
