= Lessons in Love (Level 42 song) =

Single by Level 42

from the album Running in the Family
- B-side: "Hot Water" (live)
- Released: 14 April 1986
- Recorded: March 1986
- Genre: Synth-pop; new wave
- Length: 4:00
- Label: Polydor
- Songwriters: Wally Badarou; Mark King; Rowland Charles Gould
- Producer: Level 42

Level 42 singles chronology
"Leaving Me Now" (1985)	"Lessons in Love" (1986)	"World Machine" (1986)

Music video
- "Lessons in Love" on YouTube

"Lessons in Love" is a single by the English jazz-funk band Level 42, released on 14 April 1986 as the lead single from their seventh studio album, Running in the Family (1987). The single is the band's biggest hit in their homeland, where it reached number three on the UK singles chart, and internationally, topping the charts of Denmark, Finland, South Africa, Spain, Switzerland and West Germany. It is one of the few singles from the band that entered the US Billboard Hot 100 chart, reaching number 12 in 1987.

== Writing and recording ==
According to bassist Mark King, the song started out as a melody from an add-on closing sequence for the live rendition of "Physical Presence" (from their previous studio album, World Machine) on The Tube on 18 October 1985.

In December 1985, just after Christmas, King put together a rough version of the song using a Sony digital recorder, featuring a verse, chorus and a bridge. The following January, he and record producer and co-writer Wally Badarou revisited the tapes and deemed the original chorus weak; so the latter re-wrote the song's chorus from turning around the chorus chords and suggested King a new vocal line.

A couple of months later, in early March 1986, the song was recorded with the band at Maison Rouge Studios in London. Altogether it has seven basslines—three analog synths, two FM synths and two electric basses (one thumb line and a finger-style line). Synthesisers included a Synclavier, Prophet-5, Prophet-600, Yamaha DX7 and Yamaha TX816 rack—these were all kept in sync with a Garfield Electronics Doctor Click rhythm controller.

== Critical reception ==
In 2012, David Quantick described it in Q magazine as "one of the best singles of the '80s".

== Track listings ==
- UK (1986) 12-inch
1. "Lessons in Love" (extended version)
2. "Something About You" (remix)
3. "Hot Water" (live)
- Australia (1986) 12-inch
1. "Lessons in Love (extended version)
2. "World Machine"
3. "Hot Water" (live)
- US (1987) 7-inch
1. "Lessons in Love"
2. "Hot Water" (live)
- US (1987) 12-inch
1. "A1. Lessons in Love (12" remix)" – 7:48
2. "A2. Lessons in Love (7" version)" – 4:00
3. "B1. "Lessons in Love (dub mix)" – 5:45
4. "B2. "Freedom Someday (Bonus Track)" – 5:00

== Charts ==
=== Weekly charts ===
Weekly chart performance for "Lessons in Love"
Chart (1986–1987)	Peak position
Australia (Kent Music Report)	65
Austria (Ö3 Austria Top 40)	4
Belgium (Ultratop 50 Flanders)	3
Canada Top Singles (RPM)	14
Denmark (IFPI)	1
Europe (European Hot 100 Singles)	4
Finland (Suomen virallinen lista)	1
France (SNEP)	22
Greece (IFPI)	2
Ireland (IRMA)	3
Italy (Musica e dischi)	2
Netherlands (Dutch Top 40)	2
Netherlands (Single Top 100)	2
New Zealand (Recorded Music NZ)	18
Norway (VG-lista)	10
South Africa (Springbok Radio)	1
Spain (AFYVE)	1
Sweden (Sverigetopplistan)	2
Switzerland (Schweizer Hitparade)	1
UK Singles (Official Charts)	3
US Billboard Hot 100	12
US 12-inch Singles Sales (Billboard) Remix	50
US Dance Club Play (Billboard) Remix	12
US Cash Box Top 100	19
West Germany (GfK)	1

=== Year-end charts ===
1986 year-end chart performance for "Lessons in Love"
Chart (1986)	Position
Austria (Ö3 Austria Top 40)	25
Belgium (Ultratop 50 Flanders)	10
Europe (European Hot 100 Singles)	5
Netherlands (Dutch Top 40)	6
Netherlands (Single Top 100)	15
South Africa (Springbok Radio)	12
Switzerland (Schweizer Hitparade)	3
UK Singles (OCC)	25
West Germany (Media Control)	3

1987 year-end chart performance for "Lessons in Love"
Chart (1987)	Position
Canada Top Singles (RPM)	66

== Certifications ==
Certifications for "Lessons in Love"
Region	Certification	Certified units/sales
Canada (Music Canada)	Gold	50,000^{^}
Netherlands (NVPI)	Gold	75,000^{^}
United Kingdom (BPI)	Silver	250,000^{^}
^{^} Shipments figures based on certification alone.

== See also ==
- List of number-one hits of 1986 (Germany)
- List of number-one singles of 1986 (Spain)
- List of number-one singles of the 1980s (Switzerland)
