= Never Enough (Boris Dlugosch song) =

2001 single by Boris Dlugosch

Single by Boris Dlugosch featuring Róisín Murphy
- Released: 4 June 2001
- Genre: Dance
- Length: 3:51 (original radio edit)
- Label: Peppermint Jam; WEA; Positiva
- Songwriter(s): Boris Dlugosch; Michael Lange; Róisín Murphy; Mark Brydon
- Producer(s): Boris Dlugosch; Michael Lange

Boris Dlugosch singles chronology
"Check It Out (Everybody)" (1998)	"Never Enough" (2001)	"Starchild" (2001)

Róisín Murphy singles chronology
"Feel Up" (1999)	"Never Enough" (2001)	"Wonderland" (2001)

Never Enough is a song by German electronic musician Boris Dlugosch featuring the vocals of Róisín Murphy from Moloko. Dlugosch and Murphy had previously collaborated on the Moloko track "Sing It Back", which became a hit in 1999 after Dlugosch remixed it. Released in June 2001, the song reached number 16 in the United Kingdom, number 26 in Ireland, number 73 in the Netherlands, and number 95 in Germany. In the United States, it reached number three on the Billboard Dance Club Play chart.

== Track listing ==
European CD-maxi

1. "Never Enough" (original radio edit) – 3:51
2. "Never Enough" (Chocolate Puma radio edit) – 3:45
3. "Never Enough" (original club mix) – 7:16
4. "Never Enough" (Chocolate Puma remix) – 7:41
5. "Never Enough" (Bini & Martini club mix) – 7:58
6. "Never Enough" (Fusion Groove Orchestra vocal mix) – 9:49

== Personnel ==
- Róisín Murphy – vocals, songwriting
- Boris Dlugosch – production, songwriting, keyboards, programming
- Mark Brydon – keyboards, songwriting, engineering, programming
- Michael Lange – drums, additional programming, songwriting, production
- Ulli Kringler – guitars
- Jurgen Attig – bass
- Gunther Gerl – additional keyboards, mastering

== Charts ==
=== Weekly charts ===
Chart (2001)	Peak position
Europe (Eurochart Hot 100)	68
Germany (GfK)	95
Ireland (IRMA)	26
Ireland Dance (IRMA)	4
Netherlands (Single Top 100)	73
Scotland (OCC)	16
UK Singles (OCC)	16
UK Dance (OCC)	4
UK Indie (OCC)	37
US Dance Club Songs (Billboard)	3

=== Year-end charts ===
Chart (2001)	Position
US Dance Club Play (Billboard)	49

== Release history ==
Region	Date	Format(s)	Label(s)	Ref(s).
United Kingdom	4 June 2001	12-inch vinyl; CD; cassette	Positiva	
Europe	23 July 2001	12-inch vinyl; CD	Peppermint Jam; WEA	
Australia	6 August 2001	CD	Peppermint Jam; Positiva	
