= Forever More (Moloko song) =

2003 single by Moloko

Single by Moloko

from the album Statues
- B-side: "Take My Hand"
- Released: 23 June 2003
- Genre: House; dance
- Length: 7:22 (album version); 3:46 (single edit)
- Label: Echo; Roadrunner
- Songwriters: Mark Brydon; Róisín Murphy
- Producer: Mark Brydon

Moloko singles chronology
"Familiar Feeling" (2003)	"Forever More" (2003)	"Cannot Contain This" (2003)

"Forever More" is an electronica-influenced song performed by the band Moloko for their 2003 album Statues. Following its release of 23 June 2003, it reached number 17 on the UK Singles Chart, topped the UK Dance Chart, and peaked at number 15 in Romania.

== Musical structure ==
"Forever More" is a house and dance-style track that makes extensive use of two instruments: bass drums and brass horns. These two sounds are aggressively used in a one-and-a-half minute long "ad lib" session; this part of the song was cut out of the radio edit due to time constraints.

== Critical reception ==
"Forever More" was well received by critics. Contact Music called the song an "uplifting [...] dance-floor filler."

== Music video ==
The video was directed by Paul Gore and features Róisín Murphy dancing in a tunnel while singing the song. Over the course of the song she is joined by backup dancers. The video was filmed with Murphy dancing in front of a chroma keyed screen, improvising her movements. The backup dancers were added later, filmed dancing in the tunnel. Due to this, the backup dancers sometimes dance out of time with Murphy, an effect that the director wanted.

== Track listings ==
UK CD single

1. "Forever More" – 3:47
2. "Forever More" (FKEK dub mix) – 7:52
3. "Take My Hand" – 6:59
4. "Forever More" (video)

UK 12-inch single

A. "Forever More" (FKEK vocal mix) – 10:34
B. "The Time Is Now" (FK's Blissed Out Dub) – 10:27

European CD single

1. "Forever More" – 3:47
2. "Forever More" (FKEK vocal mix) – 10:34

== Charts ==
=== Weekly charts ===
Chart (2003)	Peak position
Belgium (Ultratop 50 Flanders)	26
Belgium (Ultratip Bubbling Under Wallonia)	10
Belgium Dance (Ultratop Flanders)	7
Europe (Eurochart Hot 100)	60
Germany (GfK)	96
Ireland Dance (IRMA)	9
Netherlands (Single Top 100)	77
Romania (Romanian Top 100)	15
Scotland Singles (Official Charts)	22
UK Singles (Official Charts)	17
UK Dance (Official Charts)	1
UK Indie (Official Charts)	3

=== Year-end charts ===
Chart (2003)	Position
Belgium (Ultratop 50 Flanders)	90
Romania (Romanian Top 100)	96
