= The Funky Worm =

British musical group

The Funky Worm was a British dance music studio project, assembled by record producer Mark Brydon. The group took its name from the hit Ohio Players song "Funky Worm."

The group also contained saxophonist Sim Lister. Its track "Hustle! (To the Music...)" went to No. 1 on the US Hot Dance Club Play chart in 1988. Original band founders DJs Parrot and Ping Pong (Carl Munson), were joined by the singer (now actress) Julie Stewart and were signed by WEA, before reaching No. 13 in the UK Singles Chart with "Hustle! (To the Music)...". Two less successful tracks, "The Spell! (Get Down with the Genie)" (1988) and "U + Me = Love" (1989) followed.

"The Spell! (Get Down with the Genie)" appears in the Only Fools and Horses episode "Yuppy Love".

In 1995, Brydon formed the duo Moloko with Róisín Murphy.

== See also ==
- List of number-one dance hits (United States)
- List of artists who reached number one on the US Dance chart
