= Hot Water (song) =

Single by Level 42

from the album True Colours
- B-side: "Standing in the Light"; "Dream Crazy" (US)
- Released: 24 August 1984
- Genre: Jazz-funk; new wave
- Length: 3:38 (7" version); 5:41 (album version)
- Label: Polydor
- Songwriters: Mark King; Mike Lindup; Phil Gould; Wally Badarou
- Producer: Ken Scott

Level 42 singles chronology
"Micro-Kid" (1983)	"Hot Water" (1984)	"The Chant Has Begun" (1984)

Music video
- "Hot Water" on YouTube

"Hot Water" is a single by the English jazz-funk band Level 42, released on 24 August 1984 by Polydor Records. It was released a couple of weeks before the band's fifth studio album True Colours (1984). The single reached No. 18 on the UK singles chart and was a top ten hit in the Netherlands and Norway. The song was produced by Ken Scott.

In 1985, "Hot Water" and another True Colours song, "The Chant Has Begun", were tacked onto the US version of Level 42's breakthrough studio album, World Machine, in place of "I Sleep on My Heart," "Dream Crazy" (which only appeared on the European CD version of the album), and "Coup d'état". The following year, "Hot Water" was released as the US follow-up single to the World Machine breakthrough single, "Something About You" in 1986. "Hot Water" peaked at No. 87 on the Billboard Hot 100.

A music video was created for the song, which was directed by Nick Maingay. The single also received a 10 minute remix by Shep Pettibone dubbed the "mastermix". Brian Chin of Billboard commented that this mix was "done just a bit less fast and loose than the "Something About You" remix, lighter on the special effects and longer on groove and structure."

== B-sides ==
The B-sides of the 1984 releases featured the title-track of Level 42's album, Standing in the Light (1983), which was their latest studio album when the single was released. This song was produced by Larry Dunn and Verdine White, both members of the American band Earth, Wind & Fire. The Canadian releases of 1985, featured "The Chinese Way", produced by Mike Vernon, and "Kansas City Milkman", produced by Ken Scott, as B-sides. On the 1986 US release, "Dream Crazy" was on the B-side, produced by Level 42 and Wally Badarou. The live version that appears on the US 12" release is the same version released on A Physical Presence (1985).

== Charts ==
=== Weekly charts ===
Chart (1984–1986)	Peak position
Belgium (Ultratop 50 Flanders)	5
Netherlands (Dutch Top 40)	3
Netherlands (Single Top 100)	4
Europe (Eurochart Hot 100)	21
Europe (European Hit Radio)	13
Norway (VG-lista)	10
UK Singles (Official Charts)	18
US Cash Box Top 100	78
US Billboard Hot 100	87

=== Year-end charts ===
Chart (1984)	Position
Belgium (Ultratop Flanders)	62
Netherlands (Dutch Top 40)	17
Netherlands (Single Top 100)	36
