= The Sun Goes Down (Living It Up) =

Single by Level 42

from the album Standing in the Light
- B-side: "Can't Walk You Home"
- Released: 22 July 1983
- Genre: Jazz-funk; new wave
- Length: 3:44 (single edit); 4:15 (album version)
- Label: Fontana; Polydor
- Songwriters: Mike Lindup; Mark King; Phil Gould; Wally Badarou
- Producers: Larry Dunn; Verdine White

Level 42 singles chronology
| "Out of Sight, Out of Mind" (1983) | "The Sun Goes Down (Living It Up)" (1983) | "Micro-Kid" (1983) |

Music video
- "The Sun Goes Down (Living It Up)" on YouTube

"The Sun Goes Down (Living It Up)" is a single by the English jazz-funk band Level 42, released on 22 July 1983 by Fontana and Polydor Records. It is one of the few songs by the band which featured Mike Lindup on lead vocals (although Mark King did contribute as lead vocalist on this track). After the success of "The Chinese Way", and of their third studio album The Pursuit of Accidents (1982), this song featured on the newly released Standing in the Light. The first single from the album, "Out of Sight, Out of Mind", did not obtain the expected success for the recording and for the members of the band, leaving the whole expectation for the second single.

Reaching No. 10 in the UK singles chart in the summer of 1983, it became their first single to reach the top ten. It was later included on the compilation album Level Best (1989), (shortened to 3 minutes and 44 seconds long) and features on other compilation albums released by the band.

== Production ==
The song was produced by the American musicians Larry Dunn and Verdine White, both members of the band Earth, Wind & Fire.

== Track listing ==
UK (Polydor; POSP 622) picture sleeve

- A. "The Sun Goes Down (Living It Up)" – 3:44
- B. "Can't Walk You Home" – 4:16

== Charts ==
| Chart (1983) | Peak position |
|---|---|
| UK Singles (OCC) | 10 |

== Personnel ==
Level 42

- Mike Lindup – keyboards, lead vocals
- Mark King – bass guitar, co-lead vocals, backing vocals
- Boon Gould – guitars
- Phil Gould – drums, backing vocals

Additional musicians

- Wally Badarou – keyboards
