= Things to Make and Do =

Studio album by Moloko
- Released: 10 April 2000
- Recorded: 1999–2000
- Studio: Home studio (Sheffield)
- Genre: Dance; electronica; glam rock; trip hop; experimental; house
- Length: 67:54
- Label: Echo, Sony
- Producer: Moloko

Moloko chronology
I Am Not a Doctor (1998)	Things to Make and Do (2000)	All Back to the Mine (2001)

Professional ratings
Review scores
Source	Rating
AllMusic	4/5 stars
BBC	(favourable) link
NME	link
Q	4/5 stars

Things to Make and Do is the third album by the electronic/dance duo Moloko, released in the UK by Echo Records in 2000. It was a sonic departure for Moloko, with the tracks being less reliant on electronics and more on live musicians. In addition to the change in musical styles, the lead singer, Róisín Murphy, had changed her lyrical style. At time of release, Murphy summed up the previous style of her lyrics, saying, "I was nineteen when I made Tight Sweater, and I knew I was pretending, but if I tried not to, I'd still be pretending. Now, I know myself better," and her lyrics on this album are described as, "Roisin's most direct and emotionally honest lyrics [so far]." (Note: In fact, Murphy met collaborator Mark Brydon at a party in 1994 when she was 20 or 21, and Tight Sweater was recorded from 1994-1995.)

After the release of Things to Make and Do, offers came in for Murphy to guest on others' records, most notably The Psychedelic Waltons, Boris D. and Handsome Boy Modelling School. The album held the record as Echo's fastest-selling UK platinum record, until beaten by Feeder's The Singles compilation six years later. The track "Indigo" was featured on the soundtrack to Mystery Men.

As of May 2015, the album has sold over 355,000 copies in the UK. As of December 2000 it has sold more than 750,000 units worldwide.

== Singles and bonus tracks ==
"The Time Is Now", the album's first single, became Moloko's biggest hit, peaking at number two on the UK Singles Chart and prompted a number three UK album début for Things to Make and Do.

Before the album's release, an unsolicited Boris Dlugosch "Sing It Back" remix became a club, then mainstream, hit (it was originally a drum and bass-ish track on I Am Not a Doctor, their previous album). After the remix became a significant hit in Ibiza and Miami, then achieved scores of dance mix compilation inclusions, it was added to Things to Make and Do as a bonus track.

== Track listing ==
All tracks written by Mark Brydon and Róisín Murphy, except where noted. All music published by Chrysalis Music Publishing.

Things to Make and Do track listing
No.	Title	Writer(s)	Length
1.	"Radio Moscow"	Eddie Stevens	0:25
2.	"Pure Pleasure Seeker"		6:31
3.	"Absent Minded Friends"		4:44
4.	"Indigo"		5:37
5.	"Being Is Bewildering"		4:06
6.	"Remain the Same"		3:40
7.	"A Drop in the Ocean"		1:58
8.	"Dumb Inc."		4:27
9.	"The Time Is Now"		5:18
10.	"Mother"		4:45
11.	"It's Your Problem"	Brydon, Murphy, Stevens	1:07
12.	"It's Nothing"		5:13
13.	"Bingo Massacre"	Brydon, Murphy, Stevens, Paul Slowley	0:25
14.	"Somebody Somewhere"	Brydon, Murphy, Ashton Thomas, Dave Cooke	5:42
15.	"Just You and Me Dancing"	Brydon, Murphy, Stevens, Slowley	1:17
16.	"If You Have a Cross to Bear You May as Well Use It as a Crutch"	Brydon, Murphy, Stevens, Slowley	3:24
17.	"Keep Stepping"	Brydon, Murphy, Stevens	0:21
18.	"Sing It Back" (Boris Musical Mix)		9:18

== Personnel ==
=== Moloko ===
- Róisín Murphy
- Mark Brydon

=== Other Musicians ===
- Eddie Stevens – hammond organ, piano, additional keyboards
- Paul Slowley – live drums
- Audrey Riley – string arrangements, cello on "The Time Is Now"
- Chris Tombling – violin on "The Time Is Now"
- Greg Warren-Wilson – violin on "The Time Is Now"
- Susan Dench – viola on "The Time Is Now"
- Nick Charles – contrabass saxophone on "Pure Pleasure Seeker"
- Rachel Syms – contrabassoon on "Pure Pleasure Seeker"
- Dave Cooke – vocals on "Somebody Somewhere"

== Charts and certifications ==
=== Weekly charts ===
Chart (2000)	Peak position
Australian Albums (ARIA)	38
Austrian Albums (Ö3 Austria)	21
Belgian Albums (Ultratop Flanders)	6
Finnish Albums (Suomen virallinen lista)	26
German Albums (Offizielle Top 100)	14
Dutch Albums (Album Top 100)	66
Norwegian Albums (VG-lista)	38
Scottish Albums (Official Charts)	3
Swiss Albums (Schweizer Hitparade)	25
UK Albums (Official Charts)	3

=== Year-end charts ===
Chart (2000)	Position
Belgian Albums (Ultratop Flanders)	45
German Albums (Offizielle Top 100)	86
UK Albums (OCC)	52

=== Certifications ===
Region	Certification	Certified units/sales
United Kingdom (BPI)	Platinum	355,196
