= Chakk =

British industrial funk band

- Origin: Sheffield, England
- Genre: Industrial music
- Years active: 1981–1987
- Labels: Doublevision; Fon; MCA
- Past members: Alan Cross; Mark Brydon; Dee Boyle; Sim Lister; Jake Harries; Jon Stuart

Chakk were an industrial funk band from Sheffield, who existed from 1981 until 1987. Members were Alan Cross, Mark Brydon, Dee Boyle, Sim Lister, Jake Harries and Jon Stuart. The band never achieved commercial success, but have been noted for their wide influence on later British dance music, particularly via Fon Studios. Mark Brydon later went on to form and achieved success with Moloko.

== History ==
Chakk's first single, "Out of the Flesh", produced by Richard H. Kirk, on Cabaret Voltaire's Doublevision label, reached number three on the independent charts in 1984. The band recorded a John Peel session on 17 October 1984 ("Cut The Dust", "Sedative Ends", "No. 3 Sound", "Mother Tongues"). Their second single "You", released in 1985, was also an indie hit, reaching number 14. They then signed an album deal with MCA Records, who released 10 Days in an Elevator. The initial version of the album was rejected and a rerecorded version was finally released in 1986; it did not sell well and the band was dropped later that year. They released a few more singles and split in 1987.

Non-MCA recordings from "You" onwards were released on their own Fon Records label ("Fuck Off Nazis" or "Fear of Nazis", from a piece of 1940s graffiti on a wall in Sheffield), which was started by the band with their manager, Amrik Rai (formerly a journalist for New Musical Express). Rai also ran a record shop of the same name for a time.

The band built Fon Studios with the MCA advance money (reportedly £100,000) in 1985 as both Alan Cross and Mark Brydon had studied Architecture, with Cross having work experience designing recording studios and interior acoustics with Andy Munroe Associates and also as it was cheaper to build a studio in Sheffield than to record in London. Fon Studios and the Fon Force production team became important to Sheffield music and paved the way for labels like Warp. Brydon did significant later work in production (including "House Arrest" by Krush) and started Moloko with Róisín Murphy.

Alan Cross moved back to London where he continued to write songs for Warner Chappell Music and had dance hits with "So In Love" by Judy Cheeks and "Set Me Free" by Clubland.

== Aftermath ==
In 2007, a digital compilation of the band's FON Records' singles was released.

Chakk were featured in Eve Wood's documentary films on the Sheffield music scene, Made in Sheffield (2009) and The Beat Is the Law (2011).

In 2016, the band's debut album Clocks and Babies was remastered and reissued on CD and digitally.

== Discography ==
=== Albums ===
- Clocks and Babies (cassette, 1982)
- 10 Days in an Elevator (LP+EP, MCA MCG-6006, 1986)
- Beneath the Dancefloor – Basement Tapes (Chakk 1983–1984) (mini-LP, Fon FONX-6, 1987)
- Out of the Flesh: The Singles (download only, iTunes, 2007)

=== Singles ===
- "Out of the Flesh (Mix I)" (6:00) // "Out of the Flesh (Mix II)" (3:53) / "Out of the Flesh (Mix III)" (5:06) (12", Doublevision DVR-6, 1984) – UK Indie no. 4
- "You" / "They Say" (7", Fon FON-01, 1985) – UK Indie no. 14
- "You (Mix 1)" / "You (Mix 2)" // "They Say (Mix 1)" / "They Say (Mix 2)" (12", Fon FONT-001, 1985)
- "Imagination (Who Needs a Better Life)" (4:15) / "Imagination (Instrumental)" (7", MCA/Fon FON-2, 1986)
- "Imagination (Extended Mix)" // "Imagination (Dub Mix)" / "Imagination (Instrumental)" (12", MCA/Fon FONT-2, 1986)
- "Big Hot Blues" / "Cut the Dust" (7", MCA/Fon FON-3, 1986)
- "Big Hot Blues (Extended Mix)" // "Big Blue Mix" / "Cut the Dust" (12", MCA/Fon FONT-3, 1986)
- "Time Bomb" / "Just Pieces" (7", Fon FON-06, 1986) – UK Indie no. 20
- Timebomb EP (12", Fon FONT-6, 1986)

"Take Your Time" (5:23) // "The Pieces" (5:14) / "Just Wait" (4:57)

- Timebomb Crashpack (Fon FONT-6-P) included single-sided 12" "Out of the Flesh" (FONT-10)
- Timebomb (Bombed-Out Remixes) (12", Fon FONL-6, 1987)

"Take Your Time (Earth Calling)" // "Just Pieces (Bumper Bomb Bonus)" / "Just Pieces (Bomb-Bay Mix)" / "Just Pieces (Bouncing Beats)"

- "Brain" / "Years I Worked" (12", Fon CHAKK-1)

=== Collaboration ===
- (with The Swanhunters) "Bloodsport" (12", Fon SWAN-3, 1986)

"Bloodsport (The Full Report)" // "Bloodsport (State of Emergency)" / "Bloodsport (Too Little Too Late)"
