= I Am Not a Doctor =

Studio album by Moloko
- Released: 1 June 1998
- Recorded: 1997–1998
- Studio: Home studio (Sheffield)
- Genre: Electronica; trip hop; drum and bass; broken beat
- Length: 63:14
- Label: Echo; Sony
- Producer: Moloko

Moloko chronology
Do You Like My Tight Sweater? (1995)	I Am Not a Doctor (1998)	Things to Make and Do (2000)

Professional ratings
Review scores
Source	Rating
AllMusic	4/5 stars

I Am Not a Doctor is the second album by the English/Irish electronic dance music duo Moloko, released in 1998. The album received critical praise, although it was not a big seller. I Am Not a Doctor was issued in the UK by Echo Records. The songs on the album built upon the electronic pop of Moloko's first album, Do You Like My Tight Sweater?, with further experimentation in drum and bass and synthpop.

Included on I Am Not a Doctor is "Sing It Back", a track which entered the UK Singles Chart twice, becoming a top ten single in 1999 after being remixed by Boris Dlugosch and experiencing massive success in nightclubs. Although "The Flipside" and "Sing It Back" were released in the US by Warner Bros. Records, the latter reaching number one on the Billboard Hot Dance Club Play chart, the album was not released there after the failure of the album in the UK (despite "The Flipside"'s promo 12" single promising "the forthcoming album I AM NOT A DOCTOR.")

== Singles ==
1. "The Flipside" (#53 UK)
2. "Sing It Back" (#4 UK, #1 US Dance)
3. "Knee Deepen" (promo)

== Track listing ==
All tracks are written by Róisín Murphy and Mark Brydon.

No.	Title	Length
1.	"The Flipside"	4:10
2.	"Knee Deepen"	5:30
3.	"Blink"	4:23
4.	"Stylophone Pet"	1:09
5.	"Downsized"	4:12
6.	"Sorry"	1:33
7.	"Sing It Back"	4:23
8.	"Pretty Bridges"	5:36
9.	"Be Like You"	4:44
10.	"Caught in a Whisper"	4:35
11.	"Dr. Zee"	5:37
12.	"The I.D."	6:02
13.	"Tatty Narja"	0:35
14.	"Over My Head"	5:09
15.	"Should've Been Could've Been"	5:36
Total length:		63:14

Australian CD bonus track
No.	Title	Length
16.	"The Flipside" (Pigs in Space Remix)	8:03
Total length:		71:17

Japanese CD bonus tracks
No.	Title	Length
16.	"Uncle"	2:07
17.	"Sing It Back" (DJ Tommy 'Timmy' Mix)	5:28
Total length:		70:49

== Charts ==
Chart (1998)	Peak position
Australian Albums (ARIA)	137
Austrian Albums (Ö3 Austria)	30
German Albums (Offizielle Top 100)	91
Swiss Albums (Schweizer Hitparade)	45
UK Albums (OCC)	64
