= Statues (album) =

Studio album by Moloko
- Released: 3 March 2003
- Recorded: 2001–2002
- Studio: Metropolis Studios (London)
- Genre: Pop; dance; electronica; downtempo; experimental; house
- Length: 57:05
- Label: Echo
- Producer: Róisín Murphy; Mark Brydon

Moloko chronology
All Back to the Mine (2001)	Statues (2003)	11,000 Clicks (2004)

Singles from Statues
- 1. "Familiar Feeling" Released: 17 February 2003; 2. "Forever More" Released: 23 June 2003; 3. "Cannot Contain This" Released: 2003

Professional ratings
Review scores
Source	Rating
BBC Music	Favourable
entertainment.ie	2/5 stars
The Guardian	2/5 stars
Resident Advisor	4/5 stars
Uncut	3/5 stars

Statues is the fourth and final studio album by English-Irish electronic music duo Moloko. It was released on 3 March 2003 by The Echo Label.

== Background ==
After working with live musicians on their previous album, Things to Make and Do (2000), Moloko returned to electronic territory with this album, although the previous album's organic influences remain, as seen on "Familiar Feeling" and "Over & Over".

Production on the album was described as "massive" by Murphy, who declared the cost of it "almost killed" the band. She added "there was a very great deal of thought and attention that went into mixing this record."

At the time of its release, the long-term romantic partnership between group members Róisín Murphy and Mark Brydon had dissolved, setting the stage for Murphy's 2005 solo album, Ruby Blue. Statues is composed of material which describes the various emotional milestones in a romantic relationship, or rather as it comes apart. Moloko toured Europe extensively to promote the album and disbanded shortly thereafter.

This was the only Moloko album to be released in the US post-Warner Bros Records era. It was released in 2003 by Echo themselves as a CDr.

== Composition ==
The opening track, "Familiar Feeling", is an upbeat remembrance stated as one lover trying to convince the other that the relationship was always meant to be, and it should not be in jeopardy because of jealousy and mistrust. The song is elaborately arranged with hints of both Latin and Irish folk music. Brydon's lyrical bass guitar playing can be heard trailing Murphy's lead vocal in the song's bridge.

"Come On" suggests the diminishing sex life of a tense pairing ("Do you remember the way we danced? I wish I could forget it").

The song "Statues" implies isolation in the absence of a distant or departed lover ("If all the statues in the world would turn to flesh [...] would they be kind enough to comfort me?"). With its evident theme of dissolving romance, Statues launched a debate among fans as to whether the songs were about the end of Brydon and Murphy's romantic relationship. Murphy later commented on this on her official forum: "[A]s regards my long and fruitfull [sic] relationship with Mark, your[sic] right its[sic] all there to read in the records we made so i[sic] don't need to tell you!"

The closing track, "Over & Over", assures the audience that the pairing (in the story) has indeed dissolved, and is among the most seriously stated of Moloko's love songs. It has a lyrical yet simple, winding acoustic guitar line (which echoes in the bass line) and plaintive lyrics such as "Can't imagine where you are, you are all I've ever seen". Moloko have said that they were aiming high on "Over & Over", claiming it took two weeks of work to score just the strings for it. Brydon later said, "There was no compromise with 'Over & Over'...We all felt it should be allowed to be what it is."

Non-album tracks
Another track appearing to be from this period, initially titled "Emotional Bankruptcy", was retitled "Bankrupt Emotionally" for its appearance on the 2006 greatest hits collection Catalogue.

In contrast to the tragic view of love on Statues, the song "Take My Hand", a relatively upbeat love song, was an outtake. The song had a prominent brass scoring, jazz-funk bass line and wistful piano, as well as a confident multi-tracked delivery by Murphy that displays her extraordinary vocal technique. "Take My Hand" is available as a B-side to "Forever More", and was donated to War Child to help the charity raise money for children affected by war.

== Track listing ==
All tracks are written by Mark Brydon and Róisín Murphy.

No.	Title	Length
1.	"Familiar Feeling"	6:30
2.	"Come On"	4:40
3.	"Cannot Contain This"	5:39
4.	"Statues"	5:23
5.	"Forever More"	7:20
6.	"Blow X Blow"	3:12
7.	"100%"	5:12
8.	"The Only Ones"	4:13
9.	"I Want You"	5:05
10.	"Over & Over"	9:51

Japanese and South Korean bonus tracks
No.	Title	Length
11.	"Familiar Feeling" (Timo Maas Main Mix)	9:21
12.	"Familiar Feeling" (Martin Buttrich Remix)	6:07

Limited edition bonus DVD
No.	Title	Length
1.	"Forever More" (Belgium only)	3:51
2.	"Familiar Feeling"	3:41
3.	"Indigo"	3:23
4.	"Pure Pleasure Seeker"	3:47
5.	"The Time Is Now"	4:29
6.	"Sing It Back"	4:09
7.	"The Flipside"	3:48
8.	"Dominoid"	4:06
9.	"Fun for Me"	3:47
10.	"Where Is the What If the What Is in Why"	4:17

== Charts ==
=== Weekly charts ===
Chart (2003)	Peak position
Australian Albums (ARIA)	34
Austrian Albums (Ö3 Austria)	19
Belgian Albums (Ultratop Flanders)	1
Belgian Albums (Ultratop Wallonia)	25
Danish Albums (Hitlisten)	27
Dutch Albums (Album Top 100)	28
Finnish Albums (Suomen virallinen lista)	12
French Albums (SNEP)	135
German Albums (Offizielle Top 100)	12
Irish Albums (IRMA)	59
Scottish Albums (OCC)	19
Swiss Albums (Schweizer Hitparade)	26
UK Albums (OCC)	18

=== Year-end charts ===
Chart (2003)	Position
Belgian Albums (Ultratop Flanders)	5

== Certifications ==
Region	Certification	Certified units/sales
Belgium (BRMA)	Gold	25,000^{*}
United Kingdom (BPI)	Silver	60,000^{^}
^{*} Sales figures based on certification alone.^{^} Shipments figures based on certification alone.
