= Hustle! (To the Music...) =

"Hustle (To the Music...)"

Single by The Funky Worm

from the album The Funky Worm
- Released: 1988
- Recorded: 1988
- Genre: House
- Length: 7:32
- Label: Fon/WEA (UK); Atlantic Records (US)
- Songwriter(s): Carl Munson; Julie Stewart; Mark Brydon; Richard "Parrot" Barratt
- Producer(s): Mark Brydon

The Funky Worm singles chronology
"Hustle (To the Music...)" (1988)	"The Spell! (Get Down With The Genie)" (1988)

"Hustle! (To the Music...)" is a Disco-themed Dance/House/Pop single produced by Mark Brydon and co-written with Carl Munson, Julie Stewart, and Richard "Parrot" Barratt under the British project act The Funky Worm. The single reached #13 in the UK Singles Chart, but it was more successful in the United States, eventually reaching number one on Billboard's Hot Dance Club Play on December 17, 1988. It would also be the only charted single in America for the group as they continued to chart in the United Kingdom. The song also featured two different music videos, both featuring singer Julie Stewart, one as the host of a Children's program with two farming assistants, another featured clips of various dances and cartoons.

== Track listings ==
12" (US)

- A1 Hustle! (To The Music...) (Postdora Mix) 7:32
- A2 Hustle! (The Beat Is The Lawn) 2:57
- B1 Hustle! (To The Music...) (Predora Mix) 5:08
- B2 Hustle! (Free-Style Sax Mix) 4:16
