= Sing It Back =

1999 single by Moloko

Single by Moloko

from the album I Am Not a Doctor and Things to Make and Do
- Released: 8 March 1999
- Genre: House
- Length: 4:24 (album version); 4:38 (Boris Musical mix edit); 4:08 (video edit)
- Label: Echo
- Songwriters: Róisín Murphy; Mark Brydon
- Producers: Moloko; Boris Dlugosch (remix)

Moloko singles chronology
"The Flipside" (1998)	"Sing It Back" (1999)	"The Time Is Now" (2000)

Music video
- "Sing It Back" on YouTube

"Sing It Back" is a song written and performed by Irish-English electronic music duo Moloko (Róisín Murphy and Mark Brydon). It first appeared in its original version on Moloko's second album, I Am Not a Doctor (1998); it was released as a single on 8 March 1999, reaching number 45 on the UK Singles Chart. The song experienced chart success after it was remixed by DJ Boris Dlugosch, peaking at number four in the UK in September 1999. Murphy had started writing the lyrics while clubbing in New York City, and knew the song was at heart a dance track, but the group wanted to record it in a different artistic fashion for its album version.

Together with their record company they commissioned mixes by Todd Terry (who had turned Everything But the Girl's "Missing" into an international hit). Moloko was not satisfied with the Terry mix and had to convince their label Echo Records to put out the Dlugosch version instead. The remixed version was eventually featured on over 100 compilations. It was later added on Moloko's third album, Things to Make and Do, after hitting the top ten on the UK Singles Chart. In 1999, it reached number one on the US Billboard Dance Club Play chart. Its music video was directed by Dawn Shadforth. As a form of barter for the remix, Moloko vocalist Róisín Murphy later co-wrote and appeared on Dlugosch's "Never Enough" single, starring in the video for that release as well.

== Critical reception ==
Scottish Aberdeen Press and Journal viewed "Sing It Back" as a "Balearic hit". In her review of the I Am Not a Doctor album, Heather Phares from AllMusic described it as a "techno torch song". Daily Record named it their best single since 1996's "Fun for Me". Stevie Chick from NME wrote, "Róisín Murphy, it must be said, has a remarkable voice, a chalky, skewed howl which can twist into a purr, a cry or a sexy growl. On 'Sing It Back', she's cast as Eartha Kitt, all unquenchable lust, sly, coquettish snarls, a luxuriant, lingering sigh. What a shame it's wasted on some of the limpest, radio-friendly handbag tedium ever put on wax."

== Music video ==
A music video was produced to promote the single, directed by Dawn Shadforth. It features Moloko vocalist Róisín Murphy dancing alone in a metallic flapper dress, accompanied by psychedelic lighting effects. The video is featured on the DVD of Moloko's special edition of the Statues album. It was later made available on Moloko's official YouTube channel in 2016 and by late 2024, the video had generated more than 38 million views.

Several live videos also exist, including one in the group's live concert movie 11,000 Clicks, a similar concert version from the Dutch Pinkpop broadcast and a samba version featured on MTV Brasil. On 20 June 2003 the band appeared on BBC's Later... with Jools Holland, and performed a version where Murphy finished head-first inside Brydon's Hammond organ.

== Impact and legacy ==
In 2002, Q Magazine ranked "Sing It Back" number 905 in their list of the "1001 Best Songs Ever" and in 2004, the magazine featured it in their "The 1010 Songs You Must Own". In 2012, Australian music channel Max ranked it number 887 in their list of "1000 Greatest Songs of All Time". In 2014, German Musikexpress ranked the song number 449 in their list of the "700 Best Songs of All-Time". In 2018, Mixmag featured "Sing It Back" in their list of "Vocal House: The 30 All-Time Biggest Anthems". In 2019, Defected Records featured it in their list of "17 Best Remixes Ever". In 2021, Tomorrowland featured the song in their "Official The Ibiza 500" at number 55. Rolling Stone ranked the song at 152 in its 2022 list of the "200 Greatest Dance Songs of All Time".

== Track listings ==
- UK CD1
1. "Sing It Back" (Tee's radio) – 3:25
2. "Sing It Back" (Booker T Loco mix) – 5:21
3. "Sing It Back" (DJ Plankton's Dub featuring Maurice) – 8:33
- UK CD2
1. "Sing It Back" (Boris Musical mix edit) – 4:38
2. "Sing It Back" (Herbert's Tasteful dub) – 5:38
3. "Sing It Back" (Tee's Freeze mix) – 9:02
- UK 12-inch single

A. "Sing It Back" (Tee's Freeze mix) – 9:02
B. "Sing It Back" (Boris Musical mix) – 9:19

- UK cassette single
1. "Sing It Back" (Boris Musical mix edit) – 4:38
2. "Sing It Back" (Can 7 Supermarket mix edit) – 4:03
3. "Sing It Back" (Tee's radio mix) – 4:23
- French CD single
1. "Sing It Back" (Boris Musical mix edit) – 4:38
2. "Sing It Back" (Tee's radio) – 3:25
- German CD single
1. "Sing It Back" (Boris radio edit) – 3:35
2. "Sing It Back" (Boris Musical mix) – 9:15
- Australian CD single
1. "Sing It Back" (Boris Dlugosch Musical mix edit) – 4:38
2. "Sing It Back" (Can 7 Supermarket mix edit) – 4:03
3. "Sing It Back" (Boris Dlugosch Musical mix) – 9:17
4. "Sing It Back" (Tee's Freeze mix) – 9:02
5. "Sing It Back" (Can 7 Supermarket mix) – 8:19

== Charts ==
=== Weekly charts ===
Chart (1999)	Peak position
Australia (ARIA)	20
Belgium (Ultratop 50 Flanders)	31
Belgium (Ultratop 50 Wallonia)	26
Canada Dance/Urban (RPM)	2
Europe (Eurochart Hot 100)	15
Finland (Suomen virallinen lista)	14
France (SNEP)	35
Germany (GfK)	47
Iceland (Íslenski Listinn Topp 40)	28
Ireland (IRMA)	12
Italy (Musica e dischi)	32
Netherlands (Dutch Top 40)	11
Netherlands (Single Top 100)	24
New Zealand (Recorded Music NZ)	27
Scottish Singles Sales (Official Charts)	5
Spain (Promusicae)	5
Sweden (Sverigetopplistan)	50
Switzerland (Schweizer Hitparade)	18
UK Singles (Official Charts)	4
UK Dance (Official Charts)	1
UK Indie (Official Charts)	1
US Dance Club Play (Billboard)	1
US Maxi-Singles Sales (Billboard)	44

=== Year-end charts ===
Chart (1999)	Position
Canada Dance/Urban (RPM)	16
Europe (Eurochart Hot 100)	100
Netherlands (Dutch Top 40)	93
UK Singles (OCC)	92
UK Airplay (Music Week)	21
UK Club Chart (Music Week)	13
US Dance Club Play (Billboard)	15

== Certifications ==
Region	Certification	Certified units/sales
New Zealand (RMNZ)	Gold	15,000^{‡}
United Kingdom (BPI)	Platinum	600,000^{‡}
^{‡} Sales+streaming figures based on certification alone.

== Covers ==
- The mash-up compilation Mashed features a mash-up of "Sing It Back" and "Connection" by Elastica called "Sing Back Connection".
- In 2012 Andy Caldwell and Michael Teixeira collaborated on a cover, featuring vocals by Lisa Donnelly.
- In 2015 the Swingrowers released an electro swing cover of the original.
- In December 2017, Pete Tong released a version, featuring Becky Hill, on his album Ibiza Classics.

== See also ==
- List of number-one dance singles of 1999 (U.S.)
