= Leaving Me Now =

Single by Level 42

from the album World Machine
- B-side: "I Sleep on My Heart"
- Released: 29 November 1985
- Studio: Maison Rouge (Fulham, West London)
- Genre: Pop rock; new wave
- Length: 3:34 (single edit); 5:03 (album edit)
- Label: Polydor
- Songwriters: Mark King; Phil Gould; Wally Badarou
- Producer: Level 42

Level 42 singles chronology
"Something About You" (1985)	"Leaving Me Now" (1985)	"Lessons in Love" (1986)

Music video
- "Leaving Me Now" on YouTube

"Leaving Me Now" is a single by the English jazz-funk band Level 42, released on 29 November 1985 by Polydor Records. It was the second single from their sixth studio album World Machine (1985). The song was written by Mark King, Phil Gould and Wally Badarou. A slow, emotive ballad written about the end of a relationship, it contains a piano solo by Mike Lindup in the middle and at the end, though this is edited down for the single.

The single's cover art is identical to the follow-up single "World Machine", and illustrates a hole in the sky. The single was released in many countries beyond the United Kingdom, including the United States, Germany, Australia, the Netherlands, Canada, Argentina, and Japan.

== Music video ==
The music video for the song was directed by Nigel Dick. It features Mark King's dark clown magician character from the music video for "Something About You" showing regret for his actions as he takes off his makeup.

== Charts ==
Chart (1985)	Peak position
Belgium (Ultratop 50 Flanders)	40
Netherlands (Dutch Top 40)	33
Netherlands (Single Top 100)	27
Ireland (IRMA)	19
New Zealand (Recorded Music NZ)	35
UK Singles (Official Charts)	15
