= Starchild (song) =

Single by Level 42

from the album Level 42
- B-side: "Foundation and Empire Part 1"
- Released: October 1981
- Genre: Jazz-funk
- Length: 4:04
- Label: Polydor
- Songwriters: Wally Badarou; Mark King; Phil Gould
- Producer: Mike Vernon

Level 42 singles chronology
"Turn It On" (1981)	"Starchild" (1981)	"Are You Hearing (What I Hear)?" (1982)

"Starchild" is a song written by Wally Badarou, Mark King and Phil Gould. It was released in 1981 as part of English jazz-funk band Level 42's eponymous debut album. The song was released as single in the same year. It peaked at No. 47 on the UK Singles Chart and entered the U.S. Club Play Singles chart at No. 60. It was Level 42's fifth single and was the band's first song to enter the Club Play Singles chart.

The single has been released in six countries beyond the United Kingdom, including Ireland, the United States, Germany, Belgium and the Netherlands. In 2001, it was re-released in remix form by BMR on the label Peppermint Jam Records in the United Kingdom and Germany.

== Charts ==
Chart (1981)	Peak position
UK Singles (OCC)	47
