= Level 42 (album) =

Studio album by Level 42
- Released: August 1981
- Recorded: 1981
- Studios: Vineyard Studios, Chipping Norton Recording Studios and RAK Studios. Mixed at Red Bus Studios.
- Genres: Jazz-funk, dance-rock, jazz fusion
- Length: 43:16
- Label: Polydor
- Producer: Mike Vernon

Level 42 chronology
Level 42 (1981)	Strategy (1982)

Singles from Level 42
- 1. "Love Games" Released: March 1981; 2. "Turn it On" Released: July 1981; 3. "Starchild" Released: October 1981

Professional ratings
Review scores
Source	Rating
Allmusic	4.5/5 stars
Q	3/5 stars
BBC	(favourable)

Level 42 is the debut album released in August 1981 by the British jazz-funk band Level 42.

It is best known for the track "Love Games", which became a successful jazz-funk and dance-floor hit for the band (reaching number 38 on the UK singles chart). It has figured in both Level 42's and bassist Mark King's solo live appearances into the 2020s. Also gaining substantial dance airplay on both sides of the Atlantic Ocean was the track "Starchild", with keyboardist Mike Lindup on vocals.

The second single, "Turn it On", released in the United Kingdom, Spain, France and Canada, peaked at #47 in the UK single charts.

The third single, "Starchild", has been released in six countries beyond the United Kingdom (where it peaked at number 57), including the United States, where it entered the Disco Top 80 at number 60. In 2001, it was re-released by the label Peppermint Jam Records in the United Kingdom and Germany.

== Track listing ==
- Original Vinyl LP (Polydor 2383 612)
1. "Turn It On" (Badarou, Gould, Gould, King) – 4:42
2. "43" (King) – 7:04
3. "Why Are You Leaving?" (Gould, Lindup) – 4:36
4. "Almost There" (Gould, Gould, King) – 5:45
5. "Heathrow" (Badarou) – 4:43
6. "Love Games" (Gould, King) – 5:20
7. "Dune Tune" (King) – 4:52
8. "Starchild" (Badarou, Gould, King) – 5:58
- First CD Pressing (Polydor 821 935-2)

(On the first CD pressing, the album versions of "Turn It On", "Love Games" and "Starchild" were replaced with the extended versions. Later pressings and reissues contain the original album versions.)

1. "Turn It On" (Badarou, Gould, Gould, King) – 5:36
2. "43" (King) – 7:02
3. "Why Are You Leaving?" (Gould, Lindup) – 4:34
4. "Almost There" (Gould, Gould, King) – 5:42
5. "Heathrow" (Badarou) – 4:43
6. "Love Games" (Gould, King) – 7:25
7. "Dune Tune" (King) – 4:50
8. "Starchild" (Badarou, Gould, King) – 6:41
- 2000 reissue bonus tracks
1. Forty-Two (Gould, Gould, King, Lindup) – 6:39
2. Beezer One (Badarou, King, Gould, Lindup, Gould) – 7:09
3. Foundation & Empire (King) – 8:27
4. Dune Tune (live) (King) – 5:03
5. Goodbye Ray Schmidt-Volk – 2:07
- 2007 reissue bonus tracks
1. Heathrow (Live, Regal Theatre, Hitchin 1983)
2. Turn It On (Live, Regal Theatre, Hitchin 1983)
3. Starchild (Long Version)
4. Love Games (Live, Ryde Theatre, Isle Of Wight 2000)
5. Why Are You Leaving? (Live Ryde Theatre, Isle Of Wight 2000)

== Personnel ==
Level 42

- Mark King – bass, percussion, vocals (lead vocals on 'Turn It On', "Why Are You Leaving", "Almost There" & "Love Games")
- Mike Lindup – Minimoog, acoustic piano, electric piano, percussion, vocals (lead vocals on "Starchild", chorus lead vocals on "Turn it On" & "Almost There", bridge lead vocals on "Love Games")
- Boon Gould – guitars
- Phil Gould – drums, percussion, glockenspiel, timbales, backing vocals

with:

- Wally Badarou – Prophet-5, Korg Polyphonic, Minimoog, vocalizing (courtesy Barclay Records)
- Leroy Williams – congas, bongos, percussion
- Gary Barnacle – electric saxophone solo on "Heathrow"
- Dave Chambers – tenor saxophone solo on "Why Are You Leaving"

2007 Re-issue:

- Lyndon Connah – keyboards & vocals (Tracks 4 & 5)
- Nathan King – guitars & vocals (Tracks 4 & 5)
- Gary Husband – drums (Tracks 4 & 5)
- Sean Freeman – saxophone & vocals (Tracks 4 & 5)

== Production ==
- Mike Vernon – producer
- Dick Plant – engineer
- Gregg Jackman – assistant engineer
- Richard Lengyel – assistant engineer
- John Rule – assistant engineer
- Tom Coyne – mastering
- Joe Bartling – illustration

2007 Re-issue:

- Gary Moore – remastering
- Charles Brockbank – design
- Paul Fernandez – illustration
- Paul Sexton – liner notes

== Charts ==
=== Album charts ===
Year	Chart	Position
1981	UK Pop Albums	20
1981	Dutch Pop Albums	4
1981	Hitlistan (Sweden)	43

=== Single charts ===
Year	Song	Chart	Position
1981	"Love Games"	UK single charts	#38
1981	"Turn It On"	UK single charts	#47
1981	"Starchild"	UK single charts	#57

== Sales and certifications ==
Certifications for Level 42
Region	Certification	Certified units/sales
Netherlands (NVPI)	Gold	50,000^{^}
^{^} Shipments figures based on certification alone.
