= Familiar Feeling =

2003 single by Moloko

Single by Moloko

from the album Statues
- Released: 17 February 2003
- Length: 6:30 (album version); 3:44 (single version)
- Label: Echo
- Songwriter(s): Mark Brydon; Róisín Murphy
- Producer(s): Mark Brydon

Moloko singles chronology
"Indigo" (2000)	"Familiar Feeling" (2003)	"Forever More" (2003)

"Familiar Feeling" is a song by English-Irish electronica duo Moloko. It was released on 17 February 2003 as the lead single from their fourth and final studio album Statues. The song peaked at number 10 on the UK Singles Chart and number nine in Portugal.

== Track listings ==
UK 12-inch single

1. "Familiar Feeling" (Radio Edit) — 3:44
2. "Familiar Feeling" (Max Reich Vocal Mix Edit) — 5:05
3. "Familiar Feeling" (Timo Maas Main Mix Edit) — 4:02
4. "Familiar Feeling" (Robbie Rivera's Dark & Sexy Mix Edit) — 5:11

UK, European, and Australian CD single

1. "Familiar Feeling" (Radio Edit) — 3:44
2. "Familiar Feeling" (Timo Maas Main Mix Edit) — 4:02
3. "Familiar Feeling" (Martin Buttrich Remix Edit) — 4:47
4. "Familiar Feeling" (Max Reich Vocal Mix Edit) — 5:05
5. "Familiar Feeling" (Video) — 3:55

Digital download

1. "Familiar Feeling" (Radio Edit) — 3:45
2. "Familiar Feeling" (Timo Maas Main Mix Edit) — 4:02
3. "Familiar Feeling" (Martin Buttrich Remix Edit) — 4:47
4. "Familiar Feeling" (Max Reich Vocal Mix Edit) — 5:07

== Charts ==
Chart (2003)	Peak position
Australia (ARIA)	46
Austria (Ö3 Austria Top 40)	59
Belgium (Ultratop 50 Flanders)	29
Belgium (Ultratip Bubbling Under Wallonia)	7
Europe (Eurochart Hot 100)	28
Germany (GfK)	72
Ireland (IRMA)	26
Ireland Dance (IRMA)	2
Italy (FIMI)	23
Netherlands (Single Top 100)	100
Portugal (AFP)	9
Scotland (OCC)	18
Switzerland (Schweizer Hitparade)	84
UK Singles (OCC)	10
UK Dance (OCC)	3
UK Indie (OCC)	2

== Release history ==
Region	Date	Format(s)	Label(s)	Ref.
United Kingdom	17 February 2003	12-inch vinyl; CD; cassette	Echo	
Australia	24 February 2003	CD	Echo; Festival Mushroom	
