= Are You Hearing (What I Hear)? =

Single by Level 42

from the album The Pursuit of Accidents
- B-side: "The Return of the Handsome Rugged Man"
- Released: April 1982
- Genre: Jazz-funk
- Length: 3:35 (7" version); 6:07 (extended version)
- Label: Polydor
- Songwriters: Mark King; Phil Gould; Rowland Gould
- Producer: Mike Vernon

Level 42 singles chronology
"Starchild" (1981)	"Are You Hearing (What I Hear)?" (1982)	"Weave Your Spell" (1982)

Music video
- "Are You Hearing (What I Hear)?" on YouTube

"Are You Hearing (What I Hear)?" is a single by the English jazz-funk band Level 42, released in 1982.

It was the first single to be released from the album The Pursuit of Accidents, and reached #49 in the UK charts in May 1982.

== Charts ==
Chart (1982)	Peak position
UK Singles (OCC)	49

== Personnel ==
- Mark King – bass and lead vocals
- Mike Lindup – keyboards and vocals
- Boon Gould – guitars
- Phil Gould – drums and vocals
- Wally Badarou – keyboards
