= Out of Sight, Out of Mind (song) =

Single by Level 42

from the album Standing in the Light
- B-side: "You Can't Blame Louis" (re-mix)
- Released: 8 April 1983
- Recorded: 1983
- Studio: Marcus (London)
- Genre: Jazz-funk; new wave
- Length: 4:23 (7" version); 8:47 (extended version)
- Label: Polydor
- Songwriters: Phil Gould; Mark King; Mike Lindup; Rowland Gould
- Producer: Wally Badarou

Level 42 singles chronology
"The Chinese Way" (1983)	"Out of Sight, Out of Mind" (1983)	"The Sun Goes Down (Living It Up)" (1983)

"Out of Sight, Out of Mind" is a song by the English jazz-funk band Level 42. It was released as the first single from the album, Standing in the Light, reaching No. 41 on the UK singles chart in April 1983.

== Charts ==
Chart (1983)	Peak position
UK Singles (OCC)	41

== Personnel ==
- Mark King – bass and vocals
- Mike Lindup – keyboards and vocals
- Boon Gould – guitars
- Phil Gould – drums and vocals
- Wally Badarou – keyboards
