= Weave Your Spell =

Single by Level 42

from the album The Pursuit of Accidents
- B-side: "Dune Tune" (live); "Love Games" (live)
- Released: September 1982
- Genre: Jazz-funk; new wave
- Length: 3:54 (7" version); 5:39 (12" re-mix)
- Label: Polydor
- Songwriter(s): Mike Lindup; Mark King; Phil Gould
- Producer(s): Mike Vernon

Level 42 singles chronology
"Are You Hearing (What I Hear)?" (1982)	"Weave Your Spell" (1982)	"The Chinese Way" (1983)

Music video
- "Weave Your Spell" on YouTube

"Weave Your Spell" is a single by English jazz-funk band Level 42, released in 1982.

It was the second single to be released from the album, The Pursuit of Accidents and reached #43 in the UK charts in August 1982. The song features a lead vocal from keyboardist, Mike Lindup.

== Charts ==
Chart (1982)	Peak position
UK Singles (OCC)	43

== Personnel ==
- Mike Lindup – keyboards and lead vocals
- Mark King – bass and vocals
- Boon Gould – guitars
- Phil Gould – drums and vocals
- Wally Badarou – keyboards
