= Turn It On (song) =

Single by Level 42

from the album Level 42
- B-side: "Starchild"
- Released: 24 July 1981
- Genre: Jazz-funk
- Length: 5:32
- Label: Polydor
- Songwriter(s): Wally Badarou; Phil Gould; Boon Gould; Mark King
- Producer(s): Mike Vernon

Level 42 singles chronology
"Love Games" (1981)	"Turn It On" (1981)	"Starchild" (1981)

"Turn It On" is a single by English jazz-funk band Level 42. The single was released in 1981. The full-length version is the full five minutes and thirty-two seconds version. The album version was edited down to four minutes and forty-one seconds.

It was the second single to be released from the album Level 42, which reached #57 in the UK charts in August 1981.

== Charts ==
Chart (1981)	Peak position
UK Singles (OCC)	57

== Personnel ==
- Mark King – bass, lead vocals
- Mike Lindup – keyboards, backing vocals
- Boon Gould – guitars
- Phil Gould – drums, backing vocals
- Wally Badarou – keyboards
