= True Colours (Level 42 album) =

Studio album by Level 42
- Released: 5 October 1984
- Recorded: 1984
- Studio: Genetic Sound (Streatley, Berkshire); Park Gate Studios (Catsfield, East Sussex); Total Access (Redondo Beach, California)
- Genre: Jazz-funk; dance-rock; pop
- Length: 44:50
- Label: Polydor
- Producer: Ken Scott

Level 42 chronology
Standing in the Light (1983)	True Colours (1984)	A Physical Presence (1985)

Singles from True Colours
- 1. "Hot Water" Released: 24 August 1984; 2. "The Chant Has Begun" Released: 26 October 1984

Professional ratings
Review scores
Source	Rating
AllMusic	3/5 stars

True Colours is the fifth studio album by the English jazz-funk band Level 42, released on 5 October 1984 by Polydor Records. Beyond the band's native UK, the album was released in 10-plus other countries, including Japan, Germany and the US. The album peaked at #14 in the UK Albums Chart.

The first single released, "Hot Water", hit #18 on the UK Singles Chart, #7 in Belgium and #3 in the Netherlands, and has become a staple in Level 42's live sets to the present day. The second single "The Chant Has Begun", released in many countries, peaked at #41 in the UK Singles Chart.

"Hot Water" was released in the US in 1986 (after being featured in a single version on the US version of the band's follow-up studio album World Machine) and entered the Billboard Hot 100, at #87.

== Track listing ==
Side A

1. "The Chant Has Begun" (Mark King, Phil Gould) – 5:23
2. "Kansas City Milkman" (Wally Badarou, King, Mike Lindup, P. Gould) – 5.31
3. "Seven Days" (P. Gould, King, Lindup, R. Gould) – 4:26
4. "Hot Water" (King, P. Gould, Lindup, Badarou) – 5:41

Side B

5. "A Floating Life" (King, P. Gould) – 5:14
6. "True Believers" (King, P. Gould) – 5:03
7. "My Hero" (King, P. Gould, Boon Gould) – 4:15 [originally a bonus track on the CD and cassette]
8. "Kouyate" (King, P. Gould, Badarou) – 4:52
9. "Hours by the Window" (King, P. Gould) – 5:10

== Personnel ==
Level 42

- Mark King – vocals; bass; percussion
- Mike Lindup – vocals; keyboards
- Boon Gould – guitars
- Phil Gould – drums; percussion

Additional musicians

- Wally Badarou – keyboards
- Gary Barnacle – alto saxophone; tenor saxophone; electric saxophone

== Production ==
- Produced and engineered by Ken Scott for KoMos Productions.
- Assisted by James Tippett-IIes and Jim Russell
- Mixed at Park Gate Studios
- Mastered by Bernie Grundman at A&M Studios (Los Angeles, CA)
- Sleeve design – Baker Dave and Malcolm Garrett for Assorted Images.
- Photography – Sheila Rock

== Chart positions ==
=== Album charts ===
Year	Chart	Position
1984	United Kingdom	#14
1984	Germany	#23
1984	Sweden	#29

=== Single charts ===
Year	Song	Chart	Position
1984	"Hot Water"	UK Singles Chart	#18
1986	"Hot Water"	Billboard Hot 100	#87
1984	"The Chant Has Begun"	UK Singles Chart	#41
