= Do You Like My Tight Sweater? =

Studio album by Moloko
- Released: 20 October 1995
- Recorded: 1994–1995
- Studio: Pondview (Sheffield)
- Genre: Electronica; trip hop; acid jazz; downtempo
- Length: 66:32
- Label: Echo; Warner Bros.
- Producer: Moloko

Moloko chronology
| Do You Like My Tight Sweater? (1995) | I Am Not a Doctor (1998) |

Singles from Do You Like My Tight Sweater?
- 1. "Where Is the What If the What Is in Why?" Released: 1995; 2. "Fun for Me" Released: 1995; 3. "Dominoid" Released: 1995; 4. "Day for Night" Released: 1996

Do You Like My Tight Sweater? is the debut album by electronic dance duo Moloko, released in October 1995 in the UK and Australia, while being released in March 1997 in the US.

It was reported by Billboard in 1996 that total sales had reached 100,000 copies. As of 2003 it has sold over 250,000 copies worldwide.

The album's first single, "Fun for Me", was used on the soundtrack of the 1997 film Batman and Robin, and was used as the theme for a Lucky Strike advertisement in Spain. The video for "Fun for Me" was inspired by Batman & Robin and directed by Bill Fishman. In addition, "Butterfly 747" was used in the 1997 dark comedy crime film Twin Town.

The album was certified silver by the British Phonographic Industry in July 2013, for UK sales exceeding 60,000 copies.

== Background ==
The title of the album is derived from the singer Róisín Murphy's chat-up line to Mark Brydon at a party in 1994: "Do you like my tight sweater? See how it fits my body!" Brydon responded with the question, "Would you like to come up to my studio and record that?" A romantic and professional relationship between the two continued for several years after.

Do You Like My Tight Sweater? combined three tracks ("Where Is the What If the What Is in Why?", "Party Weirdo", and "Ho Humm") from a 1995 independently released EP Where Is the What If the What Is in Why? (also known as Moloko EP) with fourteen new recordings.

== Critical reception ==
Professional ratings
Review scores
| Source | Rating |
|---|---|
| AllMusic | 4.5/5 stars |
| Muzik | 4/5 stars |
| NME | 6/10 |
| Select | 3/5 medals |

The Independent noted that "Moloko add a little mutant humour to the trip-hop style."

== Singles ==
- "Where Is the What If the What Is in Why?" (#189 AUS)
- "Fun for Me"
- "Dominoid" (#65 UK, #148 AUS)
- "Fun for Me" (re-issue) (#36 UK, #4 US Hot Dance Club Play)
- "Day for Night" (UK)
- "Lotus Eaters" (Funk in Your Neighborhood Mix) (US only, did not chart)
- "Day for Night" (Blakdoktor Afterglow Mix) (#37 US Hot Dance Club Play)

== Track listing ==
All tracks are written by Mark Brydon and Róisín Murphy.

| No. | Title | Length |
|---|---|---|
| 1. | "Fun for Me" | 5:08 |
| 2. | "Tight Sweater" | 0:15 |
| 3. | "Day for Night" | 5:23 |
| 4. | "I Can't Help Myself" | 5:45 |
| 5. | "Circus" | 0:19 |
| 6. | "Lotus Eaters" | 7:32 |
| 7. | "On My Horsey" | 0:34 |
| 8. | "Dominoid" | 4:11 |
| 9. | "Party Weirdo" | 7:01 |
| 10. | "Tubeliar" | 0:25 |
| 11. | "Ho Humm" | 5:38 |
| 12. | "Butterfly 747" | 4:30 |
| 13. | "Dirty Monkey" | 0:23 |
| 14. | "Killa Bunnies" | 2:19 |
| 15. | "Boo" | 5:47 |
| 16. | "Where Is the What If the What Is in Why?" | 4:16 |
| 17. | "Who Shot the Go-Go Dancer?" | 6:58 |

== Personnel ==
- Róisín Murphy – vocals
- Mark Brydon – bass guitar, keyboards, guitars, programming, production

== Charts ==
| Chart (1995–96) | Peak position |
|---|---|
| Australian Albums Chart | 179 |
| UK Albums Chart | 92 |
