= The Pursuit of Accidents =

The Pursuit Of Accidents

Studio album by Level 42
- Released: September 1982
- Recorded: Eden Studios, Battery Studios, Vineyard Studios, Basing Street Studios, Red Bus Studios and Maison Rouge Studios (all London) and Chipping Norton Recording Studios, Chipping Norton; mixed at Red Bus, Maison Rouge and Livingston Studios, London
- Genre: Dance-rock, jazz-funk
- Length: 45:05 (LP/Cassette) 58.46 (CD)
- Label: Polydor
- Producer: Mike Vernon

Level 42 chronology
Strategy (1982)	The Pursuit Of Accidents (1982)	Standing in the Light (1983)

Singles from The Pursuit of Accidents
- 1. "Are You Hearing (What I Hear)?" Released: April 1982; 2. "Weave Your Spell" Released: September 1982; 3. "The Chinese Way" Released: January 1983

Professional ratings
Review scores
Source	Rating
Allmusic	link

The Pursuit of Accidents is the third studio album released by the jazz/funk British musical group Level 42, in 1982. It was issued on CD in 1985. It was re-issued on CD in 2000 as part of a two disc set with the album "Standing In The Light", and again in 2007 as a stand-alone disc. The album reached #17 on the UK album charts.

The album features three singles. The first single "Are You Hearing (What I Hear)?" peaked at #49; the second, "Weave Your Spell", peaked at #43. The third single was "The Chinese Way", and became the band's first top thirty hit when it reached #24 in 1983. It was issued in six countries beyond the United Kingdom, including Ireland, Germany, Spain and United States of America.

== Track listing ==
1. "Weave Your Spell" (Lindup, King, P. Gould) – 5:30
2. "The Pursuit Of Accidents" (Badarou, King, Lindup, P. Gould) – 7:44
3. "Last Chance" (P.Gould, King, Lindup) – 4:30
4. "Are You Hearing (What I Hear)?" (King, P. Gould, R. Gould) – 4:58
5. "You Can't Blame Louis" (King, P. Gould, Badarou) – 5:05
6. "Eyes Waterfalling" (King, P. Gould, Lindup, R. Gould) – 5:58
7. "Shapeshifter" (King) – 5:09
8. "The Chinese Way" (King, P. Gould, Badarou) – 5:53
9. "The Chinese Way" (extended John Luongo remix) 7:23 – included on the 1985 CD issue
10. "You Can't Blame Louis" (extended remix) 6:14 – included on the 1985 CD issue

== Personnel ==
Level 42

- Mark King – vocals, additional keyboards, bass guitar, percussion
- Mike Lindup – vocals, acoustic piano, electric piano, Prophet-5, Minimoog, percussion
- Boon Gould – guitars
- Phil Gould – drums, percussion, Roland TR-808, backing vocals

with:

- Wally Badarou – Prophet-5, Solina String Ensemble
- Pete Wingfield – clavinet on "Are You Hearing (What I Hear)?"
- Pete Jacobsen – Roland Jupiter-4 on "Last Chance"

== Production ==
- Mike Vernon – producer
- Jerry Boys – engineer, mixing
- Nick Launay – rhythm track recording (2)
- Dick Plant – recording (4)
- David Bascombe – additional engineer
- Gordon Milne – additional engineer
- Alwyn Clayden – sleeve design
- Bruce Gill – sleeve design
- Jay Myrdal – photography
