= Something About You (Level 42 song) =

Single by Level 42

from the album World Machine
- B-side: "Coup d'état" (version)
- Released: 13 September 1985
- Studio: Maison Rouge (Fulham, West London)
- Genre: New wave; synth-pop; dance-pop; jazz
- Length: 4:27 (album version); 3:44 (7"/video version); 7:40 (12" Sisa mix)
- Label: Polydor
- Songwriters: Mike Lindup; Phil Gould; Mark King; Rowland Gould; Wally Badarou
- Producers: Wally Badarou; Level 42

Level 42 singles chronology
"The Chant Has Begun" (1984)	"Something About You" (1985)	"Leaving Me Now" (1985)

Music video
- "Something About You" on YouTube

"Something About You" is a single by the English jazz-funk band Level 42, released on 13 September 1985 by Polydor Records, in advance of its inclusion on their sixth studio album World Machine the same year. The song was written by Mark King, Mike Lindup, Phil Gould, Boon Gould, and Wally Badarou.

== Release ==
"Something About You" was released in several countries outside the United Kingdom, including the United States, Germany, Italy, Canada, in addition to many countries in South America and Asia. It is the only Level 42 song to have been a top 10 hit in the United States, where it peaked at No. 7 on the Billboard Hot 100, as well as No. 8 on the Cashbox Top 100. It was their second top 10 hit in the United Kingdom, reaching no. 6 on the UK singles chart. The single was certified gold in Canada in 1986.

The song received a remix by Shep Pettibone, which Billboard described as a liberal recontouring, with scratched stops, additional vocals and much overdubbed keyboard work".

== Critical reception ==
In Smash Hits, Dave Rimmer wrote, "It's quite good and all that but there's absolutely nothing special about it. Not one of their best but immediately recognisable as Level 42." Reviewing the 12-inch single, Billboard referred to the song as an "eloquent, precise dance tune [that] shows art-rock as well as r&b roots."

== Compilations ==
"Something About You" appears in many Level 42 compilation albums, including Level Best (1989), The Very Best of Level 42 (1998), and The Definitive Collection (2006).

== Music video ==
The music video for "Something About You", which uses the shorter single version, is directed by Stuart Orme, who also directed videos for the Level 42 songs "Lessons in Love" and "Running in the Family" (appearing on their video album Family of Five released in 1987), as well as Phil Collins and Genesis.

Mark King appears as a dark clown magician, representing the negative aspects in the relationships of Mike Lindup, Phil and Boon Gould with their girlfriends, all played by the actress Cherie Lunghi.

== Charts ==
=== Weekly charts ===
Chart (1985–1986)	Peak position
Canada (RPM)	13
Canada (The Record)	5
Europe (European Hot 100 Singles)	33
Netherlands (Single Top 100)	33
New Zealand (Recorded Music NZ)	10
UK Singles (Official Charts)	6
US Billboard Hot 100	7
US Billboard Adult Contemporary	10
US Billboard Album Rock Tracks	45
US Dance Club Songs (Billboard) Remix	4
US Billboard Dance Singles Sales	12
US Cash Box Top 100	8

=== Year-end charts ===
Chart (1985)	Position
UK Singles (OCC)	53

Chart (1986)	Position
US Billboard Hot 100	37
US Cash Box Top 100	83

== Certifications ==
Region	Certification	Certified units/sales
New Zealand (RMNZ)	Gold	15,000^{‡}
^{‡} Sales+streaming figures based on certification alone.
