= Standing in the Light =

Studio album by Level 42
- Released: 26 August 1983
- Recorded: 1983
- Studios: The Complex (Los Angeles, California) and Marcus Recording Studios (London)
- Genres: Pop, jazz-funk, dance-rock
- Length: 40:59
- Label: Polydor
- Producers: Larry Dunn, Verdine White (except "Out of Sight, Out of Mind" by Wally Badarou)

Level 42 chronology
The Pursuit of Accidents (1982)	Standing in the Light (1983)	True Colours (1984)

Singles from Standing in the Light
- 1. "Out of Sight, Out of Mind" Released: April 1983; 2. "The Sun Goes Down (Living It Up)" Released: July 1983; 3. "Micro-kid" Released: October 1983

Standing in the Light is the fourth studio album by the English jazz-funk band Level 42, released on 26 August 1983 by Polydor Records. The album peaked at No. 9, being the group's first top 10 showing in the UK Pop Albums Chart. Standing in the Light has also been certified Gold in the UK by the British Phonographic Industry.

== Overview ==
Standing in the Light was produced by Larry Dunn and Verdine White of Earth, Wind & Fire.

On the final track "The Machine Stops", the lyrics are inspired by E. M. Forster's 1909 science fiction story of the same name.

The album was re-released in 2000 with bonus tracks in a two-disc compilation with the album The Pursuit of Accidents in the United Kingdom by the label Polydor.

== Critical reception ==
Professional ratings
Review scores
Source	Rating
AllMusic	3/5 stars
Blues & Soul	9/10
Record Mirror	4/5 stars
Wall Street Journal	(favourable)

With a 3 out of 5 star rating, William Cooper of AllMusic described Standing in the Light as "one of the most impressive offerings in Level 42's strong body of work." Jim Reid of Record Mirror exclaimed, "This Larry Dunn/Verdine White produced offering is mid-paced easy listening at its most soothing. What on the surface is pretty undemanding is on further inspection a subtly layered exercise in groove engineering." Pam Lambert of the Wall Street Journal said, "Standing in the Light, produced by two members of Earth, Wind & Fire, runs the gamut from syncopated funk to jazzlike textures. But however you categorize them, there's no mystery about Level 42's appeal." Blues & Soul also opined, "I liked this album very much and will not reduce its validity with excessive praise or multiple adjectives. I would, however, strongly recommend that you at least give it the benefit of your considered opinion."

== Singles ==
The first single, "Out of Sight, Out of Mind", peaked at No. 41 on the UK Singles charts. The second single, "The Sun Goes Down (Living It Up)", gave the group its first top-ten hit in the United Kingdom. The third single, "Micro-Kid", peaked at No. 37 on the UK Singles Chart.

== Track listing ==
1. "Micro-Kid" (Wally Badarou, Mark King, Phil Gould, Brian Taylor, Allee Willis) – 4:44
2. "The Sun Goes Down (Living It Up)" (Badarou, King, Mike Lindup, P. Gould) – 4:15
3. "Out of Sight, Out of Mind" (P. Gould, King, Lindup, Boon Gould) – 5:12
4. "Dance On Heavy Weather" (King, P. Gould, Lindup, Taylor, Larry Dunn, Verdine White) – 4:27
5. "A Pharaoh's Dream (Of Endless Time)" (King, P. Gould, Lindup) – 4:21
6. "Standing in the Light" (King, P. Gould, Badarou) – 3:42
7. "I Want Eyes" (King, P. Gould) 4:59
8. "People" (Lindup) – 4:55
9. "The Machine Stops" (King, P. Gould, Badarou) – 4:15

== Personnel ==
Level 42

- Mark King – vocals, scat, bass guitar, rototoms
- Mike Lindup – vocals, acoustic piano, electric piano, Memorymoog, Prophet-5, vocoder
- Boon Gould – guitars
- Phil Gould – drums, percussion, marimba, rototoms, backing vocals

with:

- Wally Badarou – Prophet-5, E-mu Emulator
- Paulinho da Costa – percussion
- Andrew Woolfolk (also of Earth, Wind & Fire) – soprano saxophone on "A Pharaoh's Dream (Of Endless Time)"

== Production ==
- Larry Dunn – producer (1, 2, 4–9)
- Verdine White – producer (1, 2, 4–9)
- Wally Badarou – producer (3)
- Chris Brunt – recording (1, 2, 4–9), mixing
- Paul Staveley O'Duffy – recording (3)
- Barbara Rooney – recording assistant (1, 2, 4–9)
- Ben Ing – mix assistant
- Indigo Ranch Studios (Malibu, California) – mixing location
- Neville Brody – sleeve design
- Sheila Rock – photography

== Charts ==
Chart (1983)	Peak position
UK Albums Chart	9
Sweden (Sverigetopplistan)	25
Germany (Offizielle Charts)	27
Dutch (Dutch Album Top 100)	34

=== Singles ===
Year	Title	Chart	Position
1983	"Out of Sight, Out of Mind"	UK Singles Chart	41
1983	"The Sun Goes Down (Living it Up)"	UK Singles Chart	10
1983	"Micro-kid"	UK Singles Chart	37
