= World Machine =

Studio album by Level 42
- Released: 18 October 1985
- Studios: Maison Rouge (Fulham, West London)
- Genres: New wave; dance-pop; jazz
- Length: 47:04
- Label: Polydor
- Producers: Wally Badarou; Level 42

Level 42 chronology
A Physical Presence (1985)	World Machine (1985)	Running in the Family (1987)

Singles from World Machine
- 1. "Something About You" Released: 13 September 1985; 2. "Leaving Me Now" Released: 29 November 1985; 3. "World Machine" Released: 1986 (US)

Professional ratings
Review scores
Source	Rating
AllMusic	4/5 stars
Rolling Stone	(mixed)

World Machine is the sixth studio album by the English jazz-funk band Level 42, released on 18 October 1985 by Polydor Records. It was the band's breakthrough album internationally and features one of their most successful singles, "Something About You".

== Composition ==
This release marked a transition from their jazz-funk beginnings to the funky pop they are best known for―a transition which eventually resulted in the departure of drummer Phil Gould subsequent to the release of their follow up studio album Running in the Family (1987).

The album features the singles "Something About You" (the band's only American top 10 hit, peaking at number 7, and a success internationally) and "Leaving Me Now". Also featured is "Physical Presence", the song from which the name for their first live album was taken.

The album was re-released in 2000 as a 2-CD set also including the band's previous studio album, True Colours (1984). In 2007, World Machine was re-released as a 2-CD remastered Deluxe Edition containing several remixes and live versions as bonus tracks.

The cover photo is of Hafnarfjall, a mountain in west Iceland.

== Commercial performance ==
World Machine peaked at No. 3 on the UK Albums Chart, staying on the chart for 72 weeks. It was also the band's first album to enter the US Billboard 200, peaking at number 18 and staying on the chart for 36 weeks. By 1987, album sales had reached 2.5 million copies, with the album also receiving a 2× Platinum certification by the British Phonographic Industry (BPI).

== Critical reception ==
In their review for World Party, Cashbox said that Level 42 were "beginning to get the recognition it deserves as the single 'Something About You' takes off." Billboard selected the title track and "Something About You" as the album's best tracks.

== Track listing ==
No.	Title	Writer(s)	Length
1.	"World Machine"	Wally Badarou; Phil Gould; Mark King; Mike Lindup	5:14
2.	"Physical Presence"	P. Gould; King	5:27
3.	"Something About You"	Lindup; P. Gould; King; Badarou; Rowland Gould	4:24
4.	"Leaving Me Now"	Badarou; King; P. Gould	5:00
5.	"I Sleep On My Heart"	Badarou; R. Gould; P. Gould; King	4:04
6.	"It's Not the Same for Us"	Badarou; King; P. Gould; Lindup	4:36
7.	"Dream Crazy" (originally included as a bonus track on some CD and cassette versions)	R. Gould; King; Lindup	3:53
8.	"Good Man in a Storm"	P. Gould; King	4:36
9.	"Coup d'état"	P. Gould; King	3:47
10.	"Lying Still"	Badarou; R. Gould; King	5:39
Total length:			47:04

- Note: The American versions of the album feature a re-ordered track listing, as well as the substitution of the tracks "Hot Water" and "The Chant Has Begun" (both of which had originally appeared on the band's previous studio album True Colours) for "I Sleep On My Heart" and "Coup d'état." The vinyl US version of the album featured the single versions of both "Hot Water" and "The Chant Has Begun," while the full-length album version of "The Chant Has Begun" did appear on the US CD edition. ("Dream Crazy," which appeared on certain European versions of the album only appeared on Canadian cassette releases).

=== Bonus tracks, released 2000 ===
No.	Title	Length
11.	"I Sleep On My Heart" (remix)	6:02
12.	"World Machine" (dub mix)	7:25
13.	"Something About You" (Sisa remix)	7:41

=== Bonus tracks (deluxe edition), released 2007 ===
1. "World Machine" (Live Hammersmith Odeon 1.2.86) *
2. "Leaving Me Now" (Live Hammersmith Odeon 1.2.86) *
3. "Something About You" (Live Hammersmith Odeon 1.2.86) *
4. "Coup d'état" (Backwards Mix) – originally the B-side to the "Something About You" single
5. "Something About You" (Shep Pettibone Mix)
6. "I Sleep On My Heart" (Live at Ryde Theatre, Isle of Wight Nov 2000)
7. "Dream Crazy" (Live at Ryde Theatre, Isle of Wight Nov 2000)
8. "Lying Still" (Live at Ryde Theatre, Isle of Wight Nov 2000)
9. "Physical Presence" (Live at Hammersmith Apollo, London, Nov 2003)
10. "Leaving Me Now" (Live at Hammersmith Apollo, London, Nov 2003)
11. "World Machine" (Phunk Investigation Club Mix) – Electrokingdom featuring Mark King

== Personnel ==
Level 42

- Mark King – bass guitar, vocals
- Mike Lindup – keyboards, vocals
- Boon Gould – guitars
- Phil Gould – drums

with:

- Wally Badarou – keyboards, Synclavier, additional vocals
- Gary Barnacle – saxophones

2007 Re-issue:

- Lyndon Connah – keyboards and vocals (Deluxe edition CD2, tracks 6–10)
- Nathan King – guitars and vocals (Deluxe edition CD2, tracks 6–10)
- Gary Husband – drums (Deluxe edition CD2, tracks 6–10)
- Sean Freeman – saxophone and vocals (Deluxe edition CD2, tracks 9, 10)

== Production ==
- Level 42 – producers
- Wally Badarou – producer
- Julian Mendelsohn – production assistant, recording, mixing
- Carlos Olms – digital engineer
- Alwyn Clayden – art direction
- Red Ranch – sleeve design
- Mike Trevillion – front cover photography
- Iain McKell – back cover photography
- Paul Crockford – management
- Paul King – management
- Outlaw Management – management company

== Charts ==
Chart	Peak position
UK Albums Chart	3
US Billboard 200	18
Canada RPM 100	15
