= Garfield Electronics Doctor Click =

The Doctor Click is a rhythm controller manufactured by the American company Garfield Electronics. It was released in 1982.

In the pre-MIDI era, the Doctor Click enabled various different synthesizers and drum machines to communicate with each other.

It features two independent channels.

There are also footswitch inputs for Play, Reset and Enter.

== Modulation ==
The unit features modulation control for VCO, VCF and VCA sections of synthesizers.

== Design ==
The unit is constructed in a metal case, uses microswitches and a screen for reading the tempo.

== Programming ==
You can step program the device by selecting Timebase 12 and use the Step button to enter the step count for each note.
