= The Time Is Now (Moloko song) =

2000 single by Moloko

- UK CD single artwork

Single by Moloko

from the album Things to Make and Do
- Released: 20 March 2000
- Genre: Disco
- Length: 5:18 (album version); 4:32 (UK edit)
- Label: Echo
- Songwriters: Róisín Murphy; Mark Brydon
- Producer: Moloko

Moloko singles chronology
"Sing It Back" (1999)	"The Time Is Now" (2000)	"Pure Pleasure Seeker" (2000)

Music video
- "The Time Is Now" on YouTube

"The Time Is Now" is a song by Irish-English electronica-pop duo Moloko, released as the lead single from their third album, Things to Make and Do (2000). Members Mark Brydon and Róisín Murphy conceived the song as an acoustic dance recording, not wanting to turn it into a loud, drum-heavy track, unlike much of their earlier work. Characterised as a "disco anthem", "The Time Is Now" has been described as one of Moloko's least electronic efforts and a musical standout of the third millennium's outset, receiving positive reviews from music critics. The song's multiple cover artworks were designed by Lizzie Finn and photographed by Barnaby & Scott.

"The Time Is Now" was released on 20 March 2000 by Echo Records and charted at number two on the UK Singles Chart the same month, outpeaking the band's previous single, "Sing It Back", which reached number four. In May 2000, the song was certified gold by the British Phonographic Industry for sales and streams greater than 400,000 units. It found success in several other European countries as well, becoming a top-20 hit in four of them. It received a nomination for the "Best British Single" at the 2001 BRIT Awards, as did its music video for "Best British Video".

== Background and release ==
Moloko producer Mark Brydon recalled, "It's probably the closest we've come to sitting down with a guitar and writing a song. We thought we'd try and make a track with the same structure as a dance record but keep it acoustic. There was this temptation to put on a big snare or something, but every time we did that it upset the balance. Being constrained by budget, we couldn't really afford the full-on disco strings, so it's not exactly Love Unlimited Orchestra. We got this quartet in to do more of a Curtis Mayfield thing. We think of them as 'street' strings." Echo Records released "The Time Is Now" in the United Kingdom on 20 March 2000 as the lead single from Things to Make and Do across three formats: two CD singles and a 12-inch vinyl single.

== Composition ==
"The Time Is Now" had been described as a "disco anthem", containing a varied blend of string instruments, an acoustic guitar that opens the song, and high-pitched vocals similar to the Bee Gees. The track ends with a fade, accompanied a looping, "chilling" piano. According to the digital sheet music published at Musicnotes, the record is set in common time with a key of C major and a tempo of 124 beats per minute.

== Critical reception ==
"The Time Is Now" received favourable reviews from music critics. Andy Hinds of AllMusic, in a review for Things to Make and Do, said "check out the nylon-string guitar in the flamenco-flavored 'The Time Is Now,' which faintly recalls Basement Jaxx's 'Rendez-Vu' and it adds a timeless quality to the music overall". Swiss radio station director Sacha Horovitz lauded, "'The Time Is Now' is the best song we have at the moment! ... They love it and we love it, so everyone's happy!" Jo Heuston of Liverpool radio station Juice 107.7 also praised the song, calling Moloko an "exciting" band. James Keith of Complex UK referred to "The Time Is Now" as "beyond ubiquitous", going on to say that it has become a paragon of the new millennium. Pop culture website Freaky Trigger compared the "shimmering" acoustic intro of the song to Steve Harley & Cockney Rebel's 1975 single "Make Me Smile (Come Up and See Me)" and called the string arrangement "perfect", referring to the track as "one of the most emotionally affecting Top 10 hits for years".

The song was nominated for "Best British Single" at the 2001 BRIT Awards but lost to Robbie Williams's "Rock DJ". The same circumstance occurred with its music video, which was nominated for "Best British Video" but also lost out to "Rock DJ"'s clip.

== Commercial performance ==
In the duo's native United Kingdom, "The Time Is Now" debuted at number two on the UK Singles Chart on 26 March 2000, unable to outsell Melanie C's debut collaboration with Lisa "Left Eye" Lopes, "Never Be the Same Again". To date, it is Moloko's highest-charting single in the UK, as well as their joint-longest-charting single alongside "Sing It Back", spending 13 weeks in the top 100. In January 2024, the British Phonographic Industry awarded the song a gold certification for sales and streams exceeding 400,000 units; it was the 73rd-highest-selling song of the UK in 2000. In Ireland, the single first appeared on the Irish Singles Chart at number 43 on 23 March 2000, climbing to its peak of number 10 three weeks later. Like in the UK, it spent a total of 13 weeks on the Irish chart. At the end of 2000, the song was ranked at number 84 on Ireland's year-end chart.

In mainland Europe, the song reached number three in Greece. It was a top-20 success in the Flanders region of Belgium and in Finland, achieving peaks of number 15 and number 12, respectively. It entered the top 40 Iceland and Italy, falling shy of the mark in Switzerland, where it settled at number 41. It found moderate chart success in Germany and the Netherlands, peaking within the top 50, and it also appeared on Ultratip Bubbling Under listing of Belgium's Wallonia region. Overall, it peaked at number 14 on the Eurochart Hot 100. In Australia, "The Time Is Now" debuted at number 50 on 21 May 2000 and climbed to number 36, its highest position, two weeks later, staying three more weeks in the top 50 before dropping out.

== Impact and legacy ==
British electronic dance and clubbing magazine Mixmag included "The Time Is Now" in their list of "The Best Basslines in Dance Music" in 2020, writing, "Another hit from the heady days of the new millennium, on 'Time Is Now' Moloko set out to make an Epic Club Banger using instruments and players. Here they're accompanied by a quartet and that strolling bassline sounds like the first Aperol Spritz of summer to us. Blue skies, a cool breeze and no worries other than where the next bev is coming from. Happy times."

== Track listings ==
- UK CD and cassette single
1. "The Time Is Now" (edit) – 4:32
2. "The Time Is Now" (Can 7 Soulfood mix) – 3:59
3. "The Time Is Now" (Francois K vocal edit) – 9:00
- UK and Dutch 12-inch single

A1. "The Time Is Now" (Francois K vocal mix) – 8:58
B1. "The Time Is Now" (Can 7 Jungle Boogie) – 7:15
B2. "The Time Is Now" (Matt Darey vocal edit) – 3:55

- Dutch CD single
1. "The Time Is Now" (edit) – 3:44
2. "The Time Is Now" (Can 7 Soulfood mix) – 3:58
- Dutch maxi-CD single
1. "The Time Is Now (edit) – 3:44
2. "The Time Is Now (Can 7 Soulfood mix) – 4:00
3. "The Time Is Now (Francois K Main vocal mix) – 9:03
4. "The Time Is Now (full length) – 5:21
- Australian and New Zealand CD single
1. "The Time Is Now" (radio edit)
2. "The Time Is Now" (DJ Plankton mix)
3. "The Time Is Now" (François K main vocal)
4. "The Time Is Now" (Matt Darey vocal)
5. "The Time Is Now" (full length)
6. "The Time Is Now" (Can 7 Soulfood edit)

== Charts ==
=== Weekly charts ===
Chart (2000)	Peak position
Australia (ARIA)	36
Belgium (Ultratop 50 Flanders)	15
Belgium (Ultratip Bubbling Under Wallonia)	3
Europe (Eurochart Hot 100)	14
Finland (Suomen virallinen lista)	12
Germany (GfK)	49
Greece (IFPI)	3
Iceland (Íslenski Listinn Topp 40)	32
Ireland (IRMA)	10
Ireland Dance (IRMA)	2
Italy (FIMI)	23
Netherlands (Single Top 100)	46
Scottish Singles Sales (Official Charts)	3
Switzerland (Schweizer Hitparade)	41
UK Singles (Official Charts)	2
UK Dance (Official Charts)	9
UK Indie (Official Charts)	1

=== Year-end charts ===
Chart (2000)	Position
Belgium (Ultratop 50 Flanders)	84
Ireland (IRMA)	84
UK Singles (OCC)	73

== Certifications ==
Region	Certification	Certified units/sales
United Kingdom (BPI)	Gold	400,000^{‡}
^{‡} Sales+streaming figures based on certification alone.

== In popular culture ==
The song was used by Sky Sports for their coverage of the Premier League from 2004 to 2009.

"The Time Is Now" was featured in the video game Grand Theft Auto V, but it was removed in 2026 without explanation, possibly due to copyright licence expiration.
