= 11,000 Clicks =

Video (Live DVD) by Moloko
- Released: June 26, 2004 (UK); September 14, 2004 (US)
- Recorded: November 22, 2003
- Length: 110 minutes
- Labels: Echo, Sanctuary Records
- Director: Dick Carruthers
- Producer: Anouk Fontaine

Moloko chronology
| Statues (2003) | 11,000 Clicks (2004) | Catalogue (2006) |
- Drums: Dave De Rose

11,000 Clicks is a DVD release from the English-Irish musical group Moloko, and their final release other than the compilation album Catalogue. It was recorded at Brixton Academy in London and also contains a documentary titled "Ed's Film" filmed by Eddie Stevens which contains footage shot by the band both backstage and on location.

== Track listing ==
1. "Familiar Feeling"
2. "I Want You"
3. "Absent Minded Friends"
4. "Day for Night"
5. "Come On"
6. "Fun for Me"
7. "Where Is the What If the What Is in Why?"
8. "Cannot Contain This"
9. "Pure Pleasure Seeker"
10. "The Time Is Now"
11. "Statues"
12. "100%"
13. "Forever More"
14. "Sing It Back"
15. "Being Is Bewildering"
16. "Blow X Blow"
17. "Indigo"
