= Boris Dlugosch =

- Also known as: VDT; Altered States; Deep Course; Booom!; Peppermint Jam Allstars; BMR; Les Visiteurs
- Born: 2 August 1968 (age 58)
- Origin: Hamburg, Germany
- Genres: House
- Years active: 1991–present

Boris Dlugosch (German pronunciation: [boːʁɪs deːlʊˈɡɔʃ]; born 2 August 1968) is a German house music producer from Hamburg. Boris is usually known for funky/deep house tracks, mostly produced in conjunction with Mousse T. and Michi Lange, his partners in the Peppermint Jam Records label.

== Career ==
Boris Dlugosch started his career as a DJ in the German night club Front in the Hammerbrook district of Hamburg. Dlugosch differed from his countrymen by playing house music tracks, instead of happy hardcore or trance, more established in Germany. As a producer, however, Dlugosch's first works, in the early 1990s, were in the happy hardcore genre, working alongside Gary D.

Dlugosch had a few occasional hits in the club circuit in the 1990s, beginning with the two tracks created with Mousse T. under the Booom! moniker, "Hold Your Head Up High" and "Keep Pushin'", with vocals by Inaya Day, and "Check It Out (Everybody)", under the alias BMR (a regular partnership with Michi Lange). Dlugosch's name achieved some fame in the year 1999 thanks to his remix of Moloko's "Sing It Back", which became a club music phenomenon. He followed up under his own name with "Never Enough", a track that featured the voice of Moloko's vocalist Róisín Murphy. It peaked at #16 in the UK Singles Chart in June 2001.

Boris Dlugosch has also remixed dozens of songs, including tracks by Mariah Carey, Mary J. Blige, Jamiroquai, Italian rapper Jovanotti, disco band First Choice, and other well-known electronic music artists such as A-ha, Röyksopp, Moloko and Daft Punk.

== Discography ==
=== Singles and EPs ===
List of singles, with selected chart positions, showing year released, certifications and album name
Title	Year	Peak chart positions					
Title	Year	CAN	GER	IRE	NED	UK	US Dance
Tanzlust EP (as VDT)	1991	—	—	—	—	—	—
Fahrstuhlmusik EP (as VDT)	1992	—	—	—	—	—	—
"Controversy" (Subtle Houzze with Gary D.)	1992	—	—	—	—	—	—
"Could This Be Love" (as Altered States with Michi Lange)	1992	—	—	—	—	—	—
"Split Feelings" (as Altered States with Michi Lange)	1993	—	—	—	—	—	—
"Deep Course DP" (as Deep Course)	1995	—	—	—	—	—	—
"Keep Pushin'" (as Booom! with Mousse T. and Inaya Day)	1996	19	—	—	—	41	25
Miami Special EP (as Peppermint Jam Allstars with Michi Lange and Mousse T)	1996	—	—	—	—	—	—
"Hold Your Head Up High" (as Booom! with Mousse T. and Inaya Day)	1997	—	—	—	96	23	7
"Check It Out (Everybody)" (as BMR with Michi Lange and Felicia Uwaje)	1998	—	—	—	—	—	—
"Live Your Life Your Way / Horny" (with Mousse T.)	1998	—	—	—	—	—	—
"Azzurro" (as Boris & Michi present Fiorello)	2000	—	—	—	—	—	—
"Never Enough" (featuring Róisín Murphy)	2001	—	95	26	73	16	3
"Starchild" (as BMR with Michi Lange and Level 42)	2001	—	—	—	—	—	—
"Time Slides By" (as Les Visiteurs with Michi Lange and Tommie Sunshine)	2005	—	—	—	—	—	—
"Bangkok"	2009	—	—	—	—	—	—
"Cycle"	2012	—	—	—	—	—	—
Knalldrang EP	2012	—	—	—	—	—	—
"Look Around You" (featuring Róisín Murphy)	2013	—	—	—	—	—	—
"Express Yourself / Follow You"	2013	—	—	—	—	—	—

=== Other productions ===
Dlugosch has collaborated on Spiller's "Groovejet (If This Ain't Love)", Fiorello's "Azzurro", Michi Lange's Michi EP #2 and Princess Superstar's "I'm So Out of Control". In 2013, Dlugosch played on the song "Step Together" by Joe Goddard from his EP Taking Over.
