= Moloko =

English-Irish electronica/trip-hop duo

- Moloko in 2003: Mark Brydon and Róisín Murphy

Background information
- Origin: Sheffield, England
- Genres: Electronica; dance-pop; alternative dance; trip hop; dance-punk
- Years active: 1994–2004
- Labels: The Echo Label, Warner Bros.
- Past members: Róisín Murphy; Mark Brydon

Moloko (/məˈloʊkoʊ/) were an English-Irish electronic music duo formed in Sheffield, England, consisting of vocalist Róisín Murphy and producer Mark Brydon. Blending elements of electronica and dance music, they are best known for their UK top 10 singles "The Time Is Now" (2000) and "Familiar Feeling" (2003) as well as the 1999 Boris Dlugosch remix of "Sing It Back", which became an international hit.

== History ==
=== Formation and success (1994–2000) ===
Murphy had no prior professional singing experience when Moloko was formed, while Brydon had previously worked on music as a producer with musicians such as Boy George and Cabaret Voltaire on releases from the 1990s. In 1994, the two met at a party in Sheffield, where Murphy approached Brydon with the chat-up line, "Do you like my tight sweater? See how it fits my body!" Its first sentence became their debut album's title, recorded while the pair had begun dating. The name Moloko comes from the narcotic-filled milk drink, Moloko Plus, in the Anthony Burgess novel A Clockwork Orange.

The group signed to Echo Records and released their single "Where Is the What If the What Is in Why?" The group's debut album, Do You Like My Tight Sweater?, was released in 1995. The group toured with Pulp following the release. The single "Fun for Me" was featured prominently on the Batman & Robin soundtrack and received radio airplay and strong MTV rotation. It reached number four in the US Dance chart. In 1997, their cover of "Are 'Friends' Electric?" featured on the Gary Numan tribute album Random.

After Moloko finished the tour, they built a home studio and recorded their second album, I Am Not a Doctor, which was released in 1998 in the United Kingdom. Though the album was unsuccessful, reaching only number 64 in the UK Albums Chart, a Boris Dlugosch remix of "Sing It Back", the third single from the album that originally failed to reach the Top 40 in the UK Singles Chart, was a huge hit, reaching number four in the UK chart and number one in the US Dance Chart. Moloko toured in support of the album, opening for Garbage in UK and Ireland in January and February 1999.

Their third album, Things to Make and Do, was released in 2000 and reached number three in the UK Albums Chart. The first single, "The Time Is Now", was their biggest hit, charting at number two. They started touring as a full band alongside percussionist Paul Slowly, keyboardist Eddie Stevens, and guitarist Dave Cooke.

=== Statues and disbandment (2003–2004) ===
Their 2003 album, Statues, produced two hit singles, "Familiar Feeling", which reached number ten in the UK, and "Forever More", which reached number 17. Brydon and Murphy ended their romantic relationship in 2002, just before they began work on the album. Murphy toured without Brydon for eighteen months in support of the album throughout 2003 and 2004. The concert at the Brixton Academy, recorded on 22 November 2003, was released on the live DVD 11,000 Clicks in 2004. Following the tour, the group disbanded.

=== Post-disbandment (2004–present) ===
Following the disbandment, both Murphy and Brydon began solo careers, with the former releasing her first solo album, Ruby Blue, in 2005.

On 22 May 2006, the band announced their greatest hits album, Catalogue, including the unreleased track "Bankrupt Emotionally", released on 17 July. The same year, Murphy and Brydon, alongside long-time Moloko guitarist Cooke, briefly interrupted their hiatus to play a select number of acoustic radio performances.

In 2016, Moloko digitally reissued their remixes on the compilation All Back To the Mine, split into two volumes and comprising a total of 68 tracks.

In 2019, the four Moloko albums were remastered and reissued on vinyl.

Since the band's disbandment, Murphy has performed several Moloko songs on her solo tours and live performances. However, she has stated in several interviews that she has no intention of reuniting with Brydon.

== Style ==
Moloko's music has been described as alternative dance, dance-pop, experimental pop, dance-punk and electropop. Heather Phares of AllMusic described the sound of their debut album similar to that of Portishead and Massive Attack with elements of dance, funk, and trip hop, while noting the group had "a sense of humour and sass unique to Moloko".

== Discography ==
=== Studio albums ===
Title	Album details	Peak chart positions										Certifications
Title	Album details	UK	AUS	AUT	BEL (Fl)	FIN	FRA	GER	IRE	NLD	SWI	Certifications
Do You Like My Tight Sweater?	Released: 20 October 1995; Label: Echo; Formats: CD, cassette, LP	92	179	—	—	—	—	—	—	—	—	BPI: Silver
I Am Not a Doctor	Released: 1 June 1998; Label: Echo; Formats: CD, cassette, LP	64	137	30	—	—	—	91	—	—	45	
Things to Make and Do	Released: 10 April 2000; Label: Echo; Formats: CD, cassette, LP	3	38	21	6	26	—	14	10	66	25	BPI: Platinum
Statues	Released: 3 March 2003; Label: Echo; Formats: CD, LP, SACD	18	34	19	1	12	135	12	59	28	26	BPI: Silver; BEA: Gold

=== Compilations ===
Title	Album details	Peak chart positions					
Title	Album details	UK	AUS	BEL (Fl)	GER	IRE	NLD
All Back to the Mine	Released: 2 October 2001; Label: Echo; Formats: CD, cassette	149	144	47	—	—	—
Catalogue	Released: 17 July 2006; Label: Echo; Format: CD	82	142	7	98	70	65
All Back to the Mine: Vol. I	Released: 11 November 2016; Label: Echo; Formats: Digital download	—	—	—	—	—	—
All Back to the Mine: Vol. II	Released: 11 November 2016; Label: Echo; Formats: Digital download	—	—	—	—	—	—

All Back to the Mine (2001) is a collection of 21 remixes (23 in Japan). Vol. I and Vol. II (2016) each contain 34 remixes, for a total of 68. Not all of the remixes on the 2001 version are included on the 2016 versions.

=== Singles ===
Title	Year	Peak chart positions										Certifications	Album
Title	Year	UK	AUS	AUT	BEL	FRA	GER	IRE	NLD	SWI	US Dance	Certifications	Album
"Where Is the What If the What Is in Why?"	1995	—	189	—	—	—	—	—	—	—	—		Do You Like My Tight Sweater?
"Fun for Me"	1995	—	—	—	—	—	—	—	—	—	—		Do You Like My Tight Sweater?
"Dominoid"	1996	65	148	—	—	—	—	—	—	—	—		Do You Like My Tight Sweater?
"Fun for Me" (re-release)	1996	36	148	—	—	—	—	—	—	—	4		Do You Like My Tight Sweater?
"Day for Night"	1996	—	—	—	—	—	—	—	—	—	37		Do You Like My Tight Sweater?
"The Flipside"	1998	53	107	—	—	—	—	—	—	—	—		I Am Not a Doctor
"Sing It Back"	1999	45	—	—	—	—	—	—	—	—	—		I Am Not a Doctor
"Sing It Back" (Remix)	1999	4	20	—	26	35	47	12	24	18	1	BPI: Gold	Things to Make and Do
"The Time Is Now"	2000	2	36	—	15	—	49	10	46	41	—	BPI: Silver	Things to Make and Do
"Pure Pleasure Seeker"	2000	21	119	—	—^{[A]}	—	—	—	—	—	—		Things to Make and Do
"Indigo"	2000	51	—	—	—^{[B]}	—	—	—	—	—	—		Things to Make and Do
"Familiar Feeling"	2003	10	46	59	29	—	72	26	100	84	—		Statues
"Forever More"	2003	17	—	—	26	—	96	—	77	—	—		Statues
"Cannot Contain This"	2003	97	—	—	—^{[C]}	—	—	—	—	—	—		Statues

- A: "Pure Pleasure Seeker" did not chart on the Flemish Ultratop 50, but peaked at number 15 on the Ultratip chart.
- B: "Indigo" did not chart on the Flemish Ultratop 50, but peaked at number 16 on the Ultratip chart.
- C: "Cannot Contain This" did not chart on the Flemish Ultratop 50, but peaked at number 3 on the Ultratip chart.

== Video ==
=== Video albums ===
Year	Video details
2004	11,000 Clicks: Released: June 2004; Label: Echo, Sanctuary; Format: DVD

== Awards and honours ==
"Best International Live Act" - Belgian TMF Awards 2004

== See also ==
- List of number-one dance hits (United States)
- List of artists who reached number one on the US Dance chart
