= Mark Brydon =

British musician

- Also known as: Captain Thirdeye, DJ Plankton, The Mole Man, Skymoo
- Born: Mark Errington Brydon; 22 December 1960 (age 65); Sunderland, England
- Genres: Electronic; trip hop; house; acid jazz; alternative dance
- Occupations: Songwriter; musician; arranger; recording engineer; producer
- Instruments: Bass guitar; keyboards; guitar; programming
- Website: mark-e-brydon.com

Mark Errington Brydon (born 22 December 1960) is an English bassist, guitarist, songwriter, arranger, recording engineer, remixer and producer best known as a member of the group Moloko.

== Previous work ==
Brydon comes from Sunderland, England, but established himself in the Sheffield music scene, most notably with the funk band Chakk whose advance from MCA Records financed the building of FON Studios. Before its bankruptcy, Brydon had divested himself of his interests in legendary FON Studios, for which he did everything from designing the studio architecture to hand-choosing equipment.

He made significant contributions to the 1987 British pop hit "House Arrest" by Krush. He furthered his career with contributions to records and remixes such as "The Funky Worm" (whose single "Hustle! (To the Music...)" would become a number one hit on Billboard's Dance Club Songs Chart in 1988) and efforts by Yazz, The Human League, Psychic TV, Boy George, Art of Noise, Sly and Robbie, Cabaret Voltaire and other groups. As a bass player / producer, he was a member of Chakk and Cloud Nine.

== Moloko ==
His biggest contribution to British art pop to date would come as a result of meeting Róisín Murphy, with whom he formed Moloko, at a party. The two hit it off immediately after singer Róisín Murphy walked up to Brydon uttering the line, "Do you like my tight sweater? See how it fits my body". They began working together first as a duo for two albums, then bringing in a full line-up to tour and record the last two Moloko albums.

Moloko went on indefinite hiatus after the release of Statues in 2003, followed by a successful tour and the release of the full length concert video 11,000 Clicks in 2004 (filmed at their final performance in Brixton, at the end of the Statues tour).

== Subsequent work ==
Following Moloko's indefinite break-up, Brydon focused his energies on the design of a new studio.

He also continues a side career as a remixer under such aliases as DJ Plankton.
