= Róisín Murphy discography =

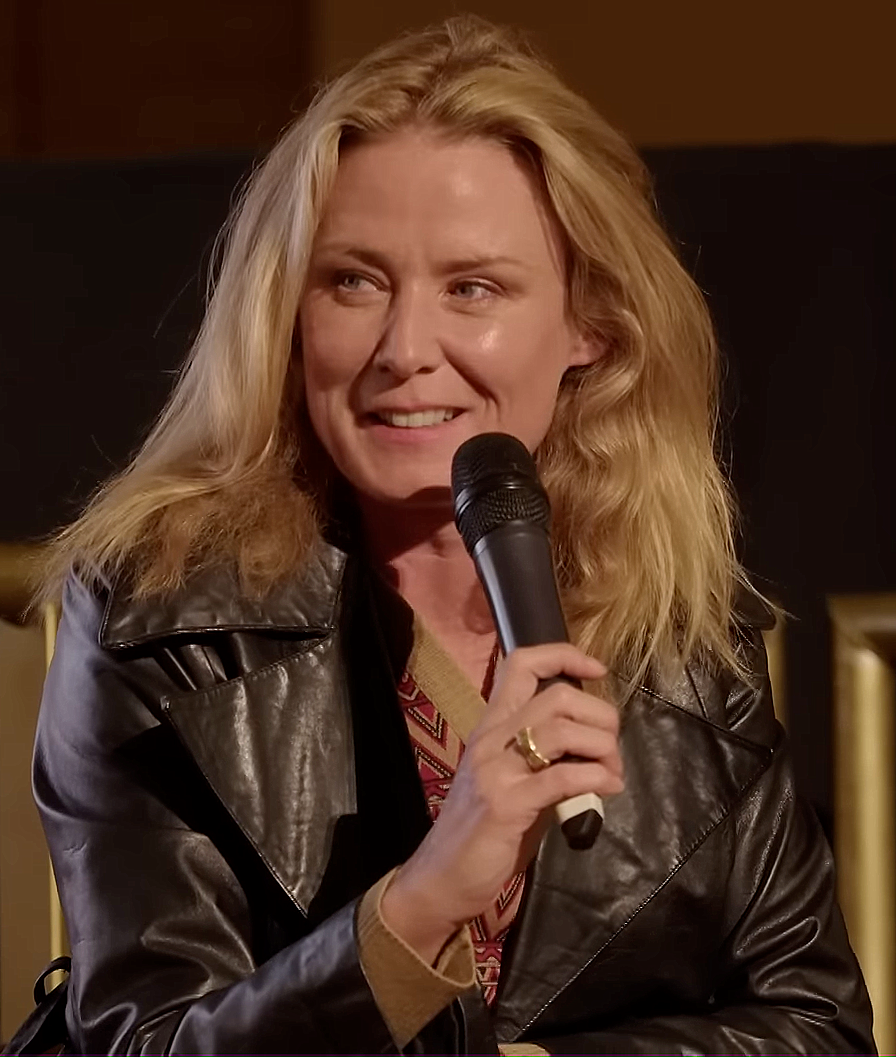
- Murphy in 2022
- Studio albums: 6
- Extended plays: 5
- Live albums: 1
- Singles: 33
- Music videos: 19
- Remix albums: 1

Irish singer and songwriter Róisín Murphy has released six studio albums, one live album, one remix album, five extended plays, 33 singles (including 10 as a featured artist) and 18 music videos. Murphy debuted in 1995 as lead singer of the electronic music duo Moloko. The duo achieved success in the United Kingdom, producing four top 20 singles. Moloko broke up in 2003 after Murphy had ended her relationship with musical partner Mark Brydon.

Murphy's first solo recordings, co-written and produced with Matthew Herbert, were released through three extended plays and were then compiled into her debut solo album Ruby Blue. Released in June 2005, the album was composed of electronic, jazz and pop songs. It reached number 88 on the UK Albums Chart and produced two singles. Overpowered, her second album, was released in October 2007. Incorporating various musical styles such as electronic, disco and house, the album received positive reviews from music critics. It reached the top 20 in the UK and produced three singles. In 2008, the album was shortlisted for the Choice Music Prize in Ireland.

== Albums ==
=== Studio albums ===
List of studio albums, with selected chart positions and certifications
Title	Details	Peak chart positions										Sales	Certifications
Title	Details	IRE	AUS	AUT	BEL (FL)	FIN	FRA	GER	NLD	SWI	UK	Sales	Certifications
Ruby Blue	Released: 13 June 2005; Label: Echo; Formats: CD, LP, digital download	—	105	50	7	29	—	43	49	43	88		
Overpowered	Released: 11 October 2007; Label: EMI; Formats: CD, LP, digital download	51	105	35	4	28	154	57	13	32	20	UK: 65,532	BEA: Gold; BPI: Silver
Hairless Toys	Released: 8 May 2015; Label: Play It Again Sam; Formats: CD, LP, digital download	16	57	29	12	—	—	27	13	25	19	UK: 17,116	
Take Her Up to Monto	Released: 8 July 2016; Label: Play It Again Sam; Formats: CD, digital download	22	73	45	40	—	—	62	65	26	41		
Róisín Machine	Released: 2 October 2020; Label: Skint, BMG; Formats: CD, LP, digital download	5	53	21	25	—	—	24	58	26	14		
Hit Parade	Released: 8 September 2023; Label: Ninja Tune; Formats: CD, LP, digital download	11	95	51	16	—	—	6	54	12	5		
"—" denotes a recording that did not chart or was not released in that territory.

=== Live albums ===
Title	Details
Live at Ancienne Belgique 19.11.07	Released: 26 November 2007 (Note: Released as a limited edition of 1,500 copies.); Label: EMI; Format: CD-R

=== Remix albums ===
Title	Details
Crooked Machine	Released: 30 April 2021; Label: BMG; Format: LP, digital download, streaming
Hit Parade Remixes	Released: 24 May 2024; Label: Mickey Murphy's Daughter; Format: digital download, streaming

== Extended plays ==
Title	Details
Sequins 1	Released: 10 February 2005; Label: Echo; Format: LP (Note: Released as limited-edition vinyl records.)
Sequins 2	Released: 3 March 2005; Label: Echo; Format: LP
Sequins 3	Released: 6 May 2005; Label: Echo; Format: LP
iTunes Live: London Sessions	Released: 7 April 2008; Label: EMI; Format: Digital download
Mi Senti	Released: 28 May 2014; Label: The Vinyl Factory; Formats: LP, digital download

== Singles ==
=== As lead artist ===
List of singles as lead artist, with selected chart positions, showing year released and album name
Title	Year	Peak chart positions								Album
Title	Year	AUS	BEL (FL)	DEN	FIN	GER	NLD	UK	US Sales	Album
"If We're in Love"	2005	—	—	—	—	—	—	—	—	Ruby Blue
"Sow into You"	2005	—	—	—	—	—	—	—	—	Ruby Blue
"Overpowered"	2007	—	28	34	10	86	44	149	—	Overpowered
"Let Me Know"	2007	—	25	—	11	—	88	28	—	Overpowered
"You Know Me Better"	2008	98	— (Note: "You Know Me Better" did not enter the Ultratop 50, but peaked at number 13 on the Flemish Ultratip chart.)	—	—	—	—	47	—	Overpowered
"Movie Star"	2008	—	—	—	—	—	—	—	8	Overpowered
"Orally Fixated"	2009	—	—	—	—	—	—	—	—	Non-album singles
"Momma's Place"	2010	—	— (Note: "Momma's Place" did not enter the Ultratop 50, but peaked at number 25 on the Flemish Ultratip chart.)	—	—	—	—	—	—	Non-album singles
"Golden Era" (with David Morales)	2012	—	—	—	—	—	—	—	—	Non-album singles
"Simulation"	2012	—	—	—	—	—	—	—	—	Róisín Machine
"Jealousy"	2015	—	—	—	—	—	—	—	—	Róisín Machine
"Exploitation"	2015	—	— (Note: "Exploitation" did not enter the Ultratop 50, but peaked at number 89 on the Flemish Ultratip chart.)	—	—	—	—	—	—	Hairless Toys
"Evil Eyes"	2015	—	—	—	—	—	—	—	—	Hairless Toys
"Unputdownable"	2015	—	—	—	—	—	—	—	—	Hairless Toys
"House of Glass" (Maurice Fulton Remix)	2015	—	—	—	—	—	—	—	—	Non-album single
"Ten Miles High"	2016	—	—	—	—	—	—	—	—	Take Her Up to Monto
"Whatever"	2016	—	—	—	—	—	—	—	—	Take Her Up to Monto
"All My Dreams" / "Innocence"	2018	—	—	—	—	—	—	—	—	Non-album singles
"Plaything" / "Like"	2018	—	—	—	—	—	—	—	—	Non-album singles
"Jacuzzi Rollercoaster" / "Can't Hang On" (featuring Ali Love)	2018	—	—	—	—	—	—	—	—	Non-album singles
"The Rumble" / "World's Crazy"	2018	—	—	—	—	—	—	—	—	Non-album singles
"Incapable"	2019	—	—	—	—	—	—	—	—	Róisín Machine
"Narcissus"	2019	—	—	—	—	—	—	—	—	Róisín Machine
"Murphy's Law"	2020	—	—	—	—	—	—	— (Note: "Murphy's Law" did not enter the UK Singles Chart, but peaked at number 91 on the UK Singles Download Chart.)	—	Róisín Machine
"Something More"	2020	—	—	—	—	—	—	—	—	Róisín Machine
"CooCool"	2023	—	—	—	—	—	—	—	—	Hit Parade
"The Universe"	2023	—	—	—	—	—	—	—	—	Hit Parade
"Fader"	2023	—	—	—	—	—	—	—	—	Hit Parade
"Freak Me Now" (with Jessie Ware)	2023	—	—	—	—	—	—	—	—	That! Feels Good!
"The House" (System Olympia Remix)	2024	—	—	—	—	—	—	—	—	Hit Parade Remixes
"—" denotes a recording that did not chart or was not released in that territory.

=== As featured artist ===
List of singles as featured artist, with selected chart positions, showing year released and album name
Title	Year	Peak chart positions					Album
Title	Year	IRE	BEL (FL) Tip	GER	NLD	UK	Album
"Feel Up" (Spook featuring Róisín Murphy)	1999	—	—	—	—	—	Non-album singles
"Never Enough" (Boris Dlugosch featuring Róisín Murphy)	2001	26	—	95	73	16	Non-album singles
"Wonderland" (The Psychedelic Waltons featuring Róisín Murphy)	2001	41	15	—	—	37	Non-album singles
"Royal T" (Crookers featuring Róisín Murphy)	2010	—	—	—	—	—	Tons of Friends
"Boadicea" (Mason featuring Róisín Murphy)	2011	—	19	—	—	—	They Are Among Us
"Cherry Picking" (Toddla T featuring Róisín Murphy)	2011	—	—	—	—	—	Watch Me Dance
"Flash of Light" (Luca C & Brigante featuring Róisín Murphy)	2012	—	—	—	—	—	Non-album singles
"Look Around You" (Boris Dlugosch featuring Róisín Murphy)	2013	—	—	—	—	—	Non-album singles
"Leviathan" (Freeform Five featuring Róisín Murphy)	2014	—	—	—	—	—	Non-album singles
"Invisions" (Luca C & Brigante featuring Róisín Murphy)	2014	—	—	—	—	—	Non-album singles
"—" denotes a recording that did not chart or was not released in that territory.

== Other charted songs ==
List of other charted songs, with selected chart positions, showing year released and album name
Title	Year	Peaks	Album
Title	Year	US Sales	Album
"In Sintesi"	2014	21	Mi Senti

== Guest appearances ==
List of non-single guest appearances, with other performing artists, showing year released and album name
Title	Year	Other artist(s)	Album
"The Truth"	1999	Handsome Boy Modeling School, J-Live	So... How's Your Girl?
"Sorted?"	2002	Pulp	B-side to "Bad Cover Version" single
"Yellow Moon"	2009	Marius de Vries	The Revolution Presents Revolution
"Hold Up Your Hand"	2010	Crookers	Tons of Friends
"Don't You Agree?"	2010	David Byrne, Fatboy Slim	Here Lies Love
"7 Hills"	2011	Tony Christie	Now's the Time!
"Dance for the Lights"	2011	The Feeling	Together We Were Made
"Alternate State"	2013	Hot Natured	Different Sides of the Sun
"Illumination"	2018	DJ Koze	Knock Knock
"Scratch That"	2018	DJ Koze	Knock Knock
"The Cruel Twirl"	2018	Ssion	O
"Salam"	2018	Mashrou' Leila	The Beirut School

== Music videos ==
List of music videos, showing year released and directors
Title	Year	Director(s)	Ref.
"If We're in Love"	2005	Simon Henwood	
"Sow into You"	2005	Simon Henwood	
"Overpowered"	2007	Jamie Thraves	
"Let Me Know"	2007	Daniel Wolfe	
"You Know Me Better"	2008	Jaron Albertin	
"Movie Star"	2008	Simon Henwood	
"Cré ni a forna"	2011	Javier Barcala	
"Simulation"	2013	Bernadette Huber, Mathias Schuckert and Maren Knieling	
"Exploitation"	2015	Róisín Murphy	
"Evil Eyes"	2015	Róisín Murphy	
"Unputdownable"	2015	Róisín Murphy	
"House of Glass" (Maurice Fulton Remix)	2015	Róisín Murphy	
"Ten Miles High"	2016	Róisín Murphy	
"Whatever"	2016	Róisín Murphy	
"All My Dreams"	2018	Róisín Murphy	
"Plaything"	2018	Róisín Murphy	
"Jacuzzi Rollercoaster"	2018	Róisín Murphy	
"The Rumble"	2018	Róisín Murphy	
"Narcissus"	2019	Róisín Murphy	
"Something More"	2020	Róisín Murphy	
"Fader"	2023	Róisín Murphy	
