= Róisín Machine =

2020 studio album by Róisín Murphy

Studio album by Róisín Murphy
- Released: 2 October 2020
- Recorded: 2012–2020
- Genre: Disco; house; electropop; nu-disco
- Length: 54:27
- Label: Skint; BMG
- Producer: Richard Barratt

Róisín Murphy chronology
Take Her Up to Monto (2016)	Róisín Machine (2020)	Crooked Machine (2021)

Singles from Róisín Machine
- 1. "Simulation" Released: 24 August 2012; 2. "Jealousy" Released: 30 March 2015; 3. "Incapable" Released: 5 June 2019; 4. "Narcissus" Released: 8 November 2019; 5. "Murphy's Law" Released: 4 March 2020; 6. "Something More" Released: 31 July 2020

Róisín Machine is the fifth solo studio album by Irish singer Róisín Murphy, released 2 October 2020 by Skint Records. The album received critical acclaim upon its release, ranking among the year's best by several publications. Commercially, Róisín Machine became Murphy's highest-charting album in both Ireland and the UK, debuting at number five and number 14 respectively. The remix album Crooked Machine was released 30 April 2021.

== Background ==
According to Murphy, work began on what would become Róisín Machine a decade prior to its release, during which time she maintained an active presence in the industry, undertaking several releases including the Italian language EP Mi Senti (2014), studio albums Hairless Toys (2015) and Take Her Up to Monto (2016), and a series of EPs with Maurice Fulton in 2018.

However, the impetus for the album came as Skint Records founder Damian Harris returned to the label as creative director in 2019. Harris helped drive the project forward, persuading Murphy to sign a recording contract with Skint Records and its parent label BMG, although Murphy negotiated the contract to be a one-album deal as she "wanted to keep [her] options open".

== Recording and production ==
"Simulation" was the first track on the record to be created, produced by her long-term collaborator Richard Barratt (also known as DJ Parrot and Crooked Man), and released through Permanent Vacation in 2012. In 2015, she released "Jealousy" through Crosstown Rebels, also produced by Barratt. Both were released as standalone tracks and did not appear on her subsequent studio album, Hairless Toys (2015), or its successor, Take Her Up to Monto (2016). Following these releases, Murphy continued to collaborate intermittently with Barratt, working in "drips and drabs over the years", on projects that would later develop into a full studio album.

Although Murphy intended the tracks to be part of an album, she and Barratt parked the idea for some time. Murphy then released a string of EPs in collaboration with Maurice Fulton in 2018, opting to release a third single with Barratt, "Incapable", once her project with Fulton was complete. "Incapable" was released via Bitter End in 2019, with the single billed as another one-off release. Speaking to the Sheffield Star, Murphy said: "You just get a bit of a burst every now and again. It's an insatiable machine, now, isn't it—content, and music. You've just got to keep feeding it, and it's just about manageable with one-off singles." Murphy had written "Incapable" in 2010, following her breakup from artist Simon Henwood, nine months after their daughter was born.

Barratt and Murphy would typically work remotely while producing and recording the album; Barratt would put the music together at his studio in Sheffield, sending the track on to Murphy to record her vocals at her home in London and send them back. According to Barratt, he used Logic 5.5 "from 1998" as his digital audio workstation for the entire record. Describing her home recording setup, Murphy said: "It's not quite a studio. I've got an Ableton rig at my house in London, which is purely for recording and working on vocals [...] I really just need a laptop, an interface and a mic."

On occasions, Barratt would request Murphy re-record her vocals in Sheffield to ensure a better take, saying: "Unless you're recording very intimate and restrained vocals, it's difficult for any singer to record themselves at home. You're having to piss about with a computer and thinking about levels, when all you should be doing is singing. Sometimes, it's good to do stuff in a studio with a booth and an engineer." Finishing the album's recording during the COVID-19 pandemic, Murphy described the experience of travelling from London to Sheffield during lockdown restrictions as "creepy", recalling "walking down deserted streets and being totally freaked out." As a result, she felt "sure some of that intense feeling found its way into the songs."

== Music and lyrics ==
A departure from the art pop, trip hop, and bossa nova influences of her previous works, Róisín Machine marks a turn into dance-oriented club music. The album features influences of disco, nu-disco, house, electropop, funk, post-disco, electro-R&B, Chicago house, dub, wonky pop, and minimal funk. The album's songs reject traditional pop structures in a manner similar to vintage disco 12-inch singles.

== Title and artwork ==
Murphy titled the album Róisín Machine to reflect her ongoing creative output, saying: "I'm always up to something, I've been directing videos and art-directing for years. The album is called Róisín Machine because I am a machine. I never stop." Vogue writer Liam Hess described the album title as "a reference to the tireless work Murphy has invested in maintaining her career as labels have come and gone. Learning to reconcile her endless curiosity and urge to experiment with her tenacity as a businessperson has been no mean feat." Elaborating in an interview with the Official Charts Company, Murphy spoke of the difficulties in releasing a record independently, with audiences expecting a regular flow of content, saying: "That's where the machine comes in. The Róisín Machine is in full effect on those levels because I do all the directing and the visuals. I have a very prolific output with or without being on a major label, which I think speaks well for me in this day and age."

The album cover photography was shot by Adrian Samson, with the artwork created by Portuguese graphic designer Bráulio Amado. Murphy styled all of the garments worn in the album artwork by herself, most of which were pulled from her own fashion archive. According to Murphy, she and Amado wanted to create a design that was redolent of a fanzine – "like it was Xeroxed" – rather than a luxury product. Murphy supplied Amado with reference images of Siouxsie Sioux, pop-punk and post-punk women, as well as vintage S&M and 70s and 80s Italian pornography. Speaking of the creative direction of the artwork, Murphy said: "I kind of went a little bit against the music in the sense that it didn’t go full-on disco queen, I went a bit more subversive."

== Release and promotion ==
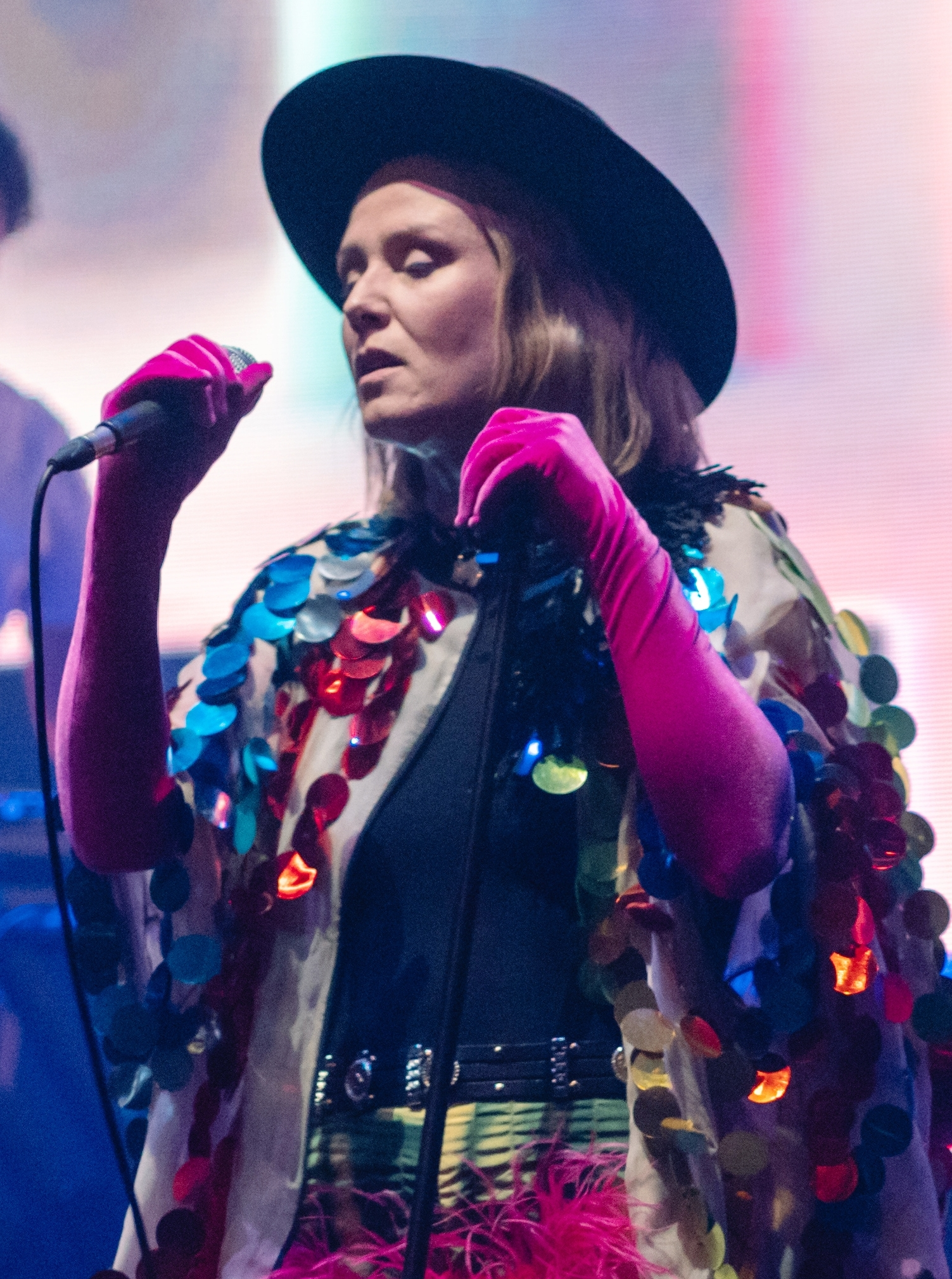
Murphy performing in March 2020 prior to the COVID-19 lockdown

Murphy announced the forthcoming release of Róisín Machine on 31 July 2020, with pre-orders made available that day. Originally planned for release on 25 September, Murphy announced in mid-September that due to manufacturing delays caused by the COVID-19 pandemic, Róisín Machine would instead be released one week later, on 2 October.

Physically, Róisín Machine was produced in CD and vinyl formats. In addition to the standard vinyl pressing, a transparent blue vinyl limited to 2,500 copies was also produced, retailing exclusively on Murphy's website. The limited edition vinyl package also included a specially produced zine and signed photograph. A second limited edition pressing featuring reworked cover art, limited to 5,000 copies of clear transparent vinyl, was released on 11 December 2020. As a tie-in with National Album Day 2021, Róisín Machine was reissued with a blue and red splatter-effect vinyl, limited to 4,000 copies.

In promotion of the album, Murphy appeared on The Graham Norton Show on 2 October, performing "Murphy's Law". Industry title Music Week noted her appearance on the chat show amid record labels vying for reduced music performance slots, due to the impact of the coronavirus pandemic on television programming. Murphy also performed "Incapable" on Jools' Annual Hootenanny on New Year's Eve 2020, in a live version with the Rhythm and Blues Orchestra.

== Critical reception ==
Professional ratings
Aggregate scores
Source	Rating
AnyDecentMusic?	8.2/10
Metacritic	86/100
Review scores
Source	Rating
AllMusic	4.5/5 stars
The Arts Desk	5/5 stars
DIY	4/5 stars
Exclaim!	8/10
The Guardian	4/5 stars
i	4/5 stars
The Irish Times	4/5 stars
Loud and Quiet	9/10
NME	5/5 stars
Pitchfork	8.0/10

Róisín Machine has received critical acclaim and currently holds a weighted average score of 86 out of 100 at review aggregator Metacritic, based on 13 reviews. The Irish Times critic Lauren Murphy called the album "disco dynamite", while Metro reviewer David Bennun described the album as "the mother lode, the cornucopia, the phantasmagoria, of lovingly reconditioned disco-pop". In a positive review, The Arts Desk referred to the album as a "musical homecoming for Róisín Murphy, both geographically and figuratively," noting the album's production with her longtime collaborator, Sheffield based Richard Barratt, whom Murphy first met while beginning her career as a musician in the city.

Writing for The Guardian, Alexis Petridis described Róisín Machine as "a sharper, more focused album than 2016's Take Her Up to Monto; one which reins in some, but not all, of its author's eccentricities [...] Certainly, it allows Murphy's talents to shine far more clearly than its sprawling predecessor." Gianni Borrelli of Australia's 7NEWS praised the album for "pushing past the standard four-on-the-floor fare" on tracks "Game Changer" and "Kingdom of Ends", calling Róisín Machine "a career best of shimmering nu-disco she's been perfecting for the last decade".

=== Year-end lists ===
Critics' rankings for Róisín Machine
Publication	Accolade	Rank	Ref.
Albumism	The 100 Best Albums of 2020	1	
BBC	The Best Albums and Songs of 2020	—N/a	
Crack	The Top 50 Albums of 2020	28	
The Fader	The 50 best albums of 2020	16	
God Is in the TV	Albums of The Year for 2020	2	
The Guardian	The 50 best albums of 2020	11	
The Independent	The 40 best albums of 2020	16	
Louder Than War	Albums of the Year 2020 - Top 50	19	
musicOMH	musicOMH's Top 50 Albums Of 2020	1	
NME	The 50 best albums of 2020	21	
Pitchfork	The 50 Best Albums of 2020	17	
The Quietus	Quietus Albums Of The Year 2020	59	
The Skinny	Top 10 Albums of 2020	10	
Wonderland	The Best Albums of 2020	—N/a	

== Commercial performance ==
In Murphy's native Ireland, Róisín Machine debuted at number 5 on the Irish Albums Chart, becoming her highest-charting album as both a solo artist or as part of Moloko. In the UK, Róisín Machine entered the Official Album Charts at number 14 with 4,724 units sold, securing Murphy her highest-charting album as a solo artist, surpassing 2015's Hairless Toys, which peaked at number 19. It also became her highest-charting album in both Australia and Germany, charting at number 53 and 24 respectively.

== Track listing ==
All tracks are written by Róisín Murphy and Richard Barratt, except where noted.

Róisín Machine track listing
No.	Title	Writer(s)	Length
1.	"Simulation"	Murphy; Barratt; Michael Ward	8:29
2.	"Kingdom of Ends"		6:10
3.	"Something More"	Amy Douglas; Murphy; Barratt	6:49
4.	"Shellfish Mademoiselle"		4:17
5.	"Incapable"		3:45
6.	"We Got Together"		5:10
7.	"Murphy's Law"	Murphy; Barratt; Dean Honer; Ward	6:21
8.	"Game Changer"		4:14
9.	"Narcissus"		4:55
10.	"Jealousy"		4:13
Total length:			54:27

Deluxe edition bonus tracks
No.	Title	Writer(s)	Length
11.	"Incapable" (Extended Mix)		8:25
12.	"Narcissus" (Extended Mix)		7:40
13.	"Murphy's Law" (Extended Mix)	Murphy; Barratt; Honer; Ward	8:00
14.	"Something More" (Extended Mix)	Douglas; Murphy; Barratt	7:56
15.	"Simulation" (Extended Mix)	Murphy; Barratt; Ward	11:37
16.	"Jealousy" (Extended Mix)		11:39
Total length:			109:47

Notes

- "Narcissus" is a re-recording of a limited edition 2017 10" vinyl release.
- The version of "Jealousy" found here is the "disco mix" from the original 2015 single, and contains uncredited elements of "New York's Movin'", written by Osborne Hunter and Steve Boston, and performed by Ahzz.
- All deluxe edition bonus tracks are the original full-length versions of the songs, with "Narcissus" being the 2019 re-recording also used earlier in the album's sequence.

== Personnel ==
Credits are adapted from the liner notes of Róisín Machine.

Production

- Richard Barratt – producer
- David Lewin – engineer
- Randy Merrill – mastering
- Dean Honer – additional engineering (track 7)
- Eric Kupper – mixdown (tracks 1, 10)
- Bráulio Amado – artwork
- Adrian Samson – photography

Musicians

- Róisín Murphy – lead vocals (all tracks)
- Rhianna Kenny – backing vocals (tracks 2–4, 7–8)
- Michael Ward – backing vocals (track 7)
- Nesreen Shah – backing vocals (track 7)
- Philly Smith – backing vocals (track 7)
- Eddie Steven – string arrangement (track 9)
- Sarah Bowler – violin (track 9)
- Debbie White – violin (track 9)
- Stephanie Benedetti – violin (track 9)
- Henry Salmon – violin (track 9)

== Charts ==
Chart performance for Róisín Machine
Chart (2020)	Peak position
Australian Albums (ARIA)	53
Austrian Albums (Ö3 Austria)	21
Belgian Albums (Ultratop Flanders)	25
Belgian Albums (Ultratop Wallonia)	142
Dutch Albums (Album Top 100)	58
German Albums (Offizielle Top 100)	24
Irish Albums (OCC)	5
Irish Independent Albums (IRMA)	1
Scottish Albums (OCC)	10
Swiss Albums (Schweizer Hitparade)	26
UK Albums (OCC)	14
UK Independent Albums (OCC)	2

== Release history ==
Release dates and formats for Róisín Machine
Region	Date	Format	Editions	Label	Ref.
Various	2 October 2020	Digital download; streaming	Standard; deluxe	Skint Records; BMG	
Various	2 October 2020	CD; LP	Standard	Skint Records; BMG	
