= Sequins 3 =

EP by Róisín Murphy
- Released: 2 May 2005
- Studio: The Dairy (London)
- Genre: Pop, alternative dance, avant-pop, electronica, nu jazz, glitch
- Label: Echo (ECSY #162)
- Producer: Matthew Herbert, Róisín Murphy

Róisín Murphy chronology
Sequins 2 (2005)	Sequins 3 (2005)	Ruby Blue (2005)

Sequins 3 is a limited edition extended play by Irish singer Róisín Murphy. It was released by Echo Records on 12-inch vinyl in April 2005.

== Songs ==
The opening track "If We're in Love" is a downtempo song featuring a boogie swing rhythm and sharp brass parts, opening with phased vocals and closing with a call and response between brass and keyboard parts. Following "Sinking Feeling", which uses a beat constructed from clicking sounds, is "Ramalama (Bang Bang)", which contains a chorus of onomatopoeic lyrics delivered over a tribal rhythm. The extended play closes with "The Closing of the Doors", a cabaret-style ballad driven by the piano.

== Cover artwork ==
The cover of Sequins 3 was painted by Simon Henwood. Murphy met Henwood in a pub, and Henwood, who was known for his simplified paintings of teenagers, thought that she would be a good subject for a painting. Henwood came to Murphy's house the next week and, while they were looking through her wardrobe, decided to have her dressed in sequins. Murphy positioned her body in abstract shapes for Henwood to paint. She developed a character, which Henwood described as a "disco electro pop diva with a 1940s look". His canvases were displayed at The Hospital in Victoria, London, and Murphy purchased them "for [her] kids so they can see what [she] once looked like."

"If We're in Love" (2005)
The song features brass sections and a boogie rhythm.

== Track listing ==
All tracks written and composed by Róisín Murphy and Matthew Herbert.

1. "If We're in Love" – 4:31
2. "Sinking Feeling" – 3:32
3. "Ramalama (Bang Bang)" – 3:35
4. "The Closing of the Doors" – 3:29

== Personnel ==
The following people contributed to Sequins 3:

- Róisín Murphy – vocals, production
- Matthew Herbert – piano, keyboards, production
- Dave O'Higgins – saxophone
- Trevor Mires – trombone
- Pete Wraight – trumpet, flute
- Max De Wardener – bass
- Phil Parnell – piano
- Simon Henwood – art direction
- Steffan Macmillan – design
