= Ruby Blue (album) =

Studio album by Róisín Murphy
- Released: 13 June 2005
- Recorded: 2004–2005
- Studio: The Dairy (London)
- Genres: Pop; alternative dance; avant-pop; electronica; nu jazz; glitch
- Length: 48:14
- Label: Echo
- Producers: Matthew Herbert; Róisín Murphy

Róisín Murphy chronology
Sequins 3 (2005)	Ruby Blue (2005)	Overpowered (2007)

Singles from Ruby Blue
- 1. "If We're in Love" Released: 13 June 2005; 2. "Sow into You" Released: 17 October 2005

Ruby Blue is the debut solo studio album by Irish singer Róisín Murphy. It was released on 13 June 2005 by Echo. After she and Mark Brydon dissolved their electronic music duo Moloko, Murphy began working with producer and musician Matthew Herbert. The songs were first released through three extended plays and were then compiled into a studio album.

The album often samples sounds made by everyday objects and actions, including cosmetics, brass mice, dancing and ornaments. It mixes the electronic music for which Moloko was known with jazz and pop styles. Ruby Blue received positive reviews from music critics and peaked at number 88 on the UK Albums Chart. The album spawned two singles, "If We're in Love" and "Sow into You".

== Background ==
Murphy and Mark Brydon ended their romantic relationship but were still contractually obligated to record another album, which became Moloko's 2003 album Statues. When she finished touring, she found herself alone and had to re-evaluate the friendships she had built. During this time, she got to know Matthew Herbert, whom she had met when he remixed several of Moloko's songs. Murphy had wanted to work with him again, commenting that "it felt very natural [...] because Matthew makes things seem quicker and easier". During the first day of recording with Herbert, he had her bring an unspecified object so that they could hit it against a microphone and record the sound it made. Herbert's approach was that for Murphy to go solo, the album should revolve around her and the sounds that surround her. They wanted to carry out recording and audio mixing in one room, so Herbert invested in a studio. There, Herbert recorded Murphy's voice without accompaniment so that she could better hear how her voice naturally sounded. On occasion, the two added instruments to a track by having her hire an instrumentalist, sometimes to play an unusual instrument such as a hammered dulcimer.

After the pair had recorded a few songs, Murphy found that she enjoyed working with Herbert, and her label let her work freely without any deadline. When she presented them the album, they found it odd and did not hear any songs that would make successful singles. The A&R division suggested that Murphy make some changes to make it more radio-friendly. Murphy refused, stating that she "wanted it to be as pure as possible". The label later came to support her. The songs on Ruby Blue were gradually released on limited-edition 12-inch vinyl EPs titled Sequins 1, Sequins 2 and Sequins 3, in January, February and May 2005 respectively.

The cover art for Ruby Blue was painted by Simon Henwood. Murphy met Henwood in a pub, and Henwood, who was known for his simplified paintings of teenagers, thought that she would be a good subject for a painting. Henwood came to Murphy's house the next week and, while they were looking through her wardrobe, decided to have her dressed in sequins. Murphy positioned her body in abstract shapes for Henwood to paint. She developed a character, which Henwood described as a "disco electro pop diva with a 1940s look". His canvases were displayed at The Hospital in London, and Murphy purchased them "for [her] kids so they can see what [she] once looked like". The three EPs and both singles used Henwood's paintings in the cover, and he later directed the music videos for the singles.

== Composition ==
Ruby Blue is an avant-pop, jazz and glitch album that mixes electronica with early-20th century vocal jazz, an interest of Herbert's. The instruments, primarily brass and woodwinds, are layered over sampled noises such as alarm clocks, a water cooler, hairspray and helmets. Murphy's vocals were described as a combination of "a less-pained Billie Holiday and a less-sheltered Doris Day". She cited OutKast's 2003 double album Speakerboxxx/The Love Below as an influence, stating that "it was experimental, it was soulful and funky". The album's lyrics are based on her romantic relationships with Brydon and then with Henwood.

"If We're in Love" (2005)
The album's lead single, which features brass sections and a boogie rhythm.

"Sow into You" (2005)
The second single, a brassy baroque pop song using a metaphor of rain and harvesting.

The opening track "Leaving the City" slowly builds up during the introduction and uses out of tune instrumentation and a repetitive chorus. Following "Sinking Feeling", which uses a beat constructed from clicking sounds, is "Night of the Dancing Flame", which combines synthesisers with 1920s jazz. It is written in waltz time and was compared to Stevie Wonder's work during his peak. After opening with noises such as rustling and coughing, the longest track "Through Time" proceeds into a ballad that was compared to those by Carole King. The fifth track "Sow into You" was released as the album's second single. The song uses a metaphor of rain and harvests to describe love and sex, atop a baroque pop brass arrangement. "Dear Diary" is a torch song mixing Northern soul with disco music with the sounds of doorbells and telephones ringing.

The seventh track "If We're in Love" was released as the album's lead single. It is a downtempo song featuring a boogie swing rhythm and sharp brass parts, opening with phased vocals and closing with a call and response between brass and keyboard parts. "Ramalama (Bang Bang)", the eighth track, contains a chorus of onomatopoeic lyrics delivered over a tribal rhythm. The title track uses overdriven guitar parts and layers of overdubbed vocals. Its lyrics caution a woman who has become out of control and its title was chosen to contrast feelings of passion and melancholy. "Off on It", a more experimental song with an unsteady rhythm, precedes "Prelude to Love in the Making", an excerpt of less than one minute taken from "Love in the Making" on Sequins 2. The album closes with "The Closing of the Doors", a cabaret-style ballad driven by the piano.

== Critical reception ==
Professional ratings
Review scores
Source	Rating
AllMusic	4/5 stars
Entertainment Weekly	A−
The Guardian	3/5 stars
Pitchfork	8.4/10
PopMatters	9/10
Stylus Magazine	B+

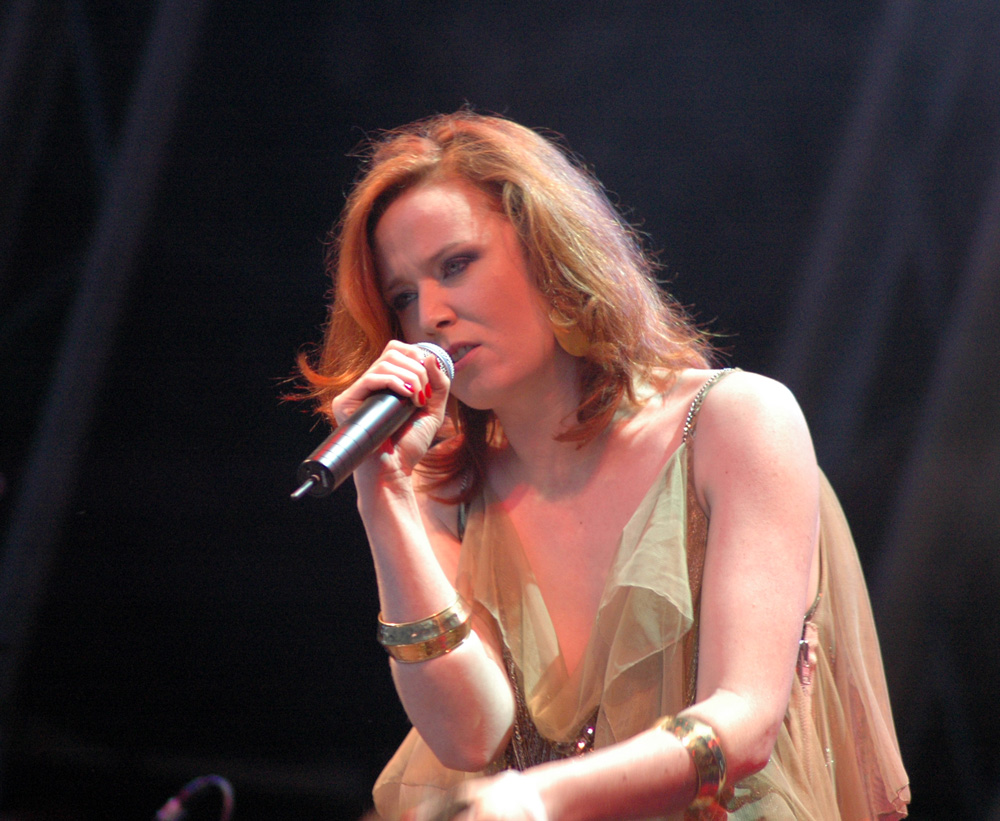
Murphy performing at the 2005 Glastonbury Festival

Ruby Blue received positive reviews from music critics. Garry Mulholland of The Observer called it "the kind of ambitious avant-pop hybrid that gets Björk rapturous acclaim". Heather Phares of AllMusic wrote that "Murphy keeps the alluring sensuality and unpredictable quirks that made Moloko unique, without sounding like she's rehashing where she's already been". Edward Oculicz of Stylus Magazine said the album "happily represents something of a midpoint between the downright oddity of Moloko's early albums [...] and the mix of disco sensibility and wrenching balladry of their swansong". Dan Raper of PopMatters praised the album as "one of the best examples of production shaping but not overwhelming the artist's vision". The Guardian's John Burgess agreed, stating that because of Herbert's production, Murphy sounded "sonically enticing and varied [...] at times sultry, rude, powerful and tender across white noise, waltz time signatures and jazz sass", but was mixed on the album overall, adding that the pair "often let their noodling eclipse the songs, leaving few you'll actually be able to sing back to anyone." Pitchfork's Mark Richardson remarked that "it's hard to imagine anyone not ranking this is [sic] the best thing Murphy has ever done" and that "when the songwriting is on, Ruby Blue seems perfect, the ultimate combination of human warmth and technological know-how." The website placed the album at number 41 on its list of the top 50 albums of 2005. In April 2015, Emily Barker of NME, on her list of "50 Still-Awesome Albums That Made 2005 a Dynamite Year for Music", ranked the album at number 33.

== Commercial performance ==
Ruby Blue peaked at number 88 on the UK Albums Chart, spending a sole week on the chart. The album was particularly successful in the Flanders region of Belgium, where it reached number seven and remained on the albums chart for 12 weeks. Elsewhere in Europe, it charted within the top 30 in Finland and the top 50 in Austria, Germany, the Netherlands and Switzerland. Echo released the album in the United States on 25 April 2006, but it failed to chart on the Billboard 200. The album won a silver award from Independent Music Companies Association which indicates 30,000 sales across Europe.

== Soundtrack appearances ==
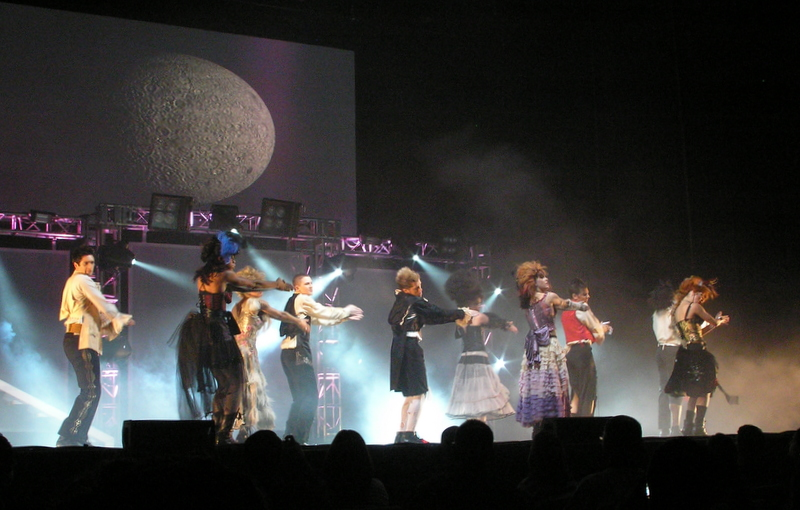
Dancers from So You Think You Can Dance performing the zombie dance

A third of the album's songs were used in the second season of the medical drama television series Grey's Anatomy in 2005. "Ruby Blue", "Ramalama (Bang Bang)", "Love in the Making" and "Night of the Dancing Flame" were used for "Make Me Lose Control", "Deny, Deny, Deny", "Bring the Pain" and "Much Too Much", respectively. The show's music supervisor, Alexandra Patsavas, stated that she had been a fan of Moloko and gave Ruby Blue a positive review. "Ruby Blue" is included on the first volume of the show's soundtrack, released on 27 September 2005.

Three songs have been used for the reality television series So You Think You Can Dance. "Ramalama (Bang Bang)" was used for a group performance on the sixth week of the second season. Contestants wore costumes and make-up to show them as zombies in a performance combining the 1968 horror film Night of the Living Dead with Michael Jackson's 1983 music video for "Thriller". At the 59th Primetime Emmy Awards, the performance was part of a three-way tie for Outstanding Choreography with a So You Think You Can Dance performance of Céline Dion's "Calling You", choreographed by Mia Michaels, and the television special Tony Bennett: An American Classic. "Night of the Dancing Flame" was used for a couple's jazz dance in the fourth week of the following season with contestants Neil Haskell and Lauren Gottlieb. The performances were choreographed by Wade Robson. Robson also did a number to "Ruby Blue" in the fifth season of So You Think You Can Dance.

== Track listing ==
All tracks are written by Róisín Murphy and Matthew Herbert.

No.	Title	Length
1.	"Leaving the City"	4:49
2.	"Sinking Feeling"	3:32
3.	"Night of the Dancing Flame"	3:26
4.	"Through Time"	5:58
5.	"Sow into You"	3:56
6.	"Dear Diary"	5:50
7.	"If We're in Love"	4:31
8.	"Ramalama (Bang Bang)"	3:35
9.	"Ruby Blue"	2:48
10.	"Off on It"	5:22
11.	"Prelude to Love in the Making"	0:53
12.	"The Closing of the Doors"	3:29

== Personnel ==
Credits adapted from liner notes of Ruby Blue.

=== Musicians ===
- Róisín Murphy – vocals, track listing arrangement
- Geoff Smith – dulcimer (track 1); tongue and other drums (track 3)
- Pete Wraight – trumpet (tracks 1–7, 9, 10); flugel (tracks 2, 7, 12); flute (track 2, 5–7, 11)
- Trevor Mires – trombone (tracks 1–7, 9, 10)
- Dave O'Higgins – saxophone (tracks 1, 3, 4, 9, 10); tenor saxophone (track 2, 5–7)
- Phil Parnell – piano (track 2); Rhodes, acoustic guitar, additional Rhodes (track 4)
- Max de Wardener – acoustic bass (tracks 2, 6); bass (track 4)
- Matthew Herbert – keys (tracks 2–8, 10, 11); synths (track 3); electric bass, Rhodes (track 6); guitar (tracks 6, 10, 11); bass (track 10); banjo (track 11); piano (track 12)
- Eddie Stevens – track listing arrangement

=== Technical ===
- Matthew Herbert – production
- Róisín Murphy – production
- Alexis Smith – engineering assistance
- Mandy Parnell – mastering (at The Exchange, London)

=== Artwork ===
- Simon Henwood – original paintings, art direction
- Steffan MacMillan – design

== Charts ==
=== Weekly charts ===
Chart (2005)	Peak position
Australian Albums (ARIA)	105
Austrian Albums (Ö3 Austria)	50
Belgian Albums (Ultratop Flanders)	7
Belgian Albums (Ultratop Wallonia)	63
Dutch Albums (Album Top 100)	49
European Albums (Billboard)	80
Finnish Albums (Suomen virallinen lista)	29
German Albums (Offizielle Top 100)	43
Swiss Albums (Schweizer Hitparade)	43
UK Albums (Official Charts)	88

=== Year-end charts ===
Chart (2005)	Position
Belgian Albums (Ultratop Flanders)	62
