= I Like This Temper =

Studio album by Lavagance
- Released: 2009
- Genre: Alternative rock
- Producer: Eddie Stevens

Lavagance chronology
Divine Darkness (2009)	I Like This Temper (2009)

I Like This Temper is Slovak alternative rock group Lavagance's fourth studio album, with five tracks plus the radio mix of "Blood".

The songs were chosen by Lavagance and completely redone with Eddie Stevens, who produced the album. The mixing was done by Stevens in his London studio. The experimental album was then mastered in Amsterdam, and like their previous albums, was made available for free download from their website.

== Track list ==
1. "Attraction"
2. "Blood"
3. "Temper
4. "It Happened Last Night"
5. "She is the..."
6. "Blood" (radio edit)

== Reception ==
After its release, the single, "Blood", spent several weeks at the top of the Alternative Chart on the Slovak Rádio FM.

== Personnel ==
- Marek Rakovický - vocals, guitar, programming, keyboards
- Vincent Susol - bass guitar, vocals
- Viliam Bujnovský - keyboards, programming
- Marek Gregor - drums, vocals, programming
- Mario Smashing - guitar, vocals, keyboards
- Peter Rakovický - keyboards, programming & sound engineering
