= Murphy's Law (Róisín Murphy song) =

2020 song by Róisín Murphy

Single by Róisín Murphy

from the album Róisín Machine
- Released: March 4, 2020
- Genre: Disco; house
- Length: 3:50 (Edit); 8:00 (Extended Mix); 6:51 (Album version)
- Label: Skint Records
- Songwriters: Róisín Murphy; Richard Barratt; Dean Honer; Michael Ward
- Producer: Richard Barratt

Róisín Murphy singles chronology
"Narcissus" (2019)	"Murphy's Law" (2020)	"Something More" (2020)

"Murphy's Law" is a song recorded by Irish singer Róisín Murphy. It was officially released on 4 March 2020, serving as the fifth single from Murphy's fifth solo studio album, Róisín Machine, released later that year. Written by Murphy, Dean Honer, Michael Ward and Richard Barratt, with song also produced by the latter, "Murphy's Law" lyrically refers to the adage of the same name in a scenario where Murphy unintentionally runs into a former lover.

== Background and recording ==
In an interview with Billboard, Murphy said "Murphy's Law" was the only track from the album they wrote and recorded in the studio together, with the others being more remote. After deciding a song about Murphy's law worked well as a disco track, she and the song's co-writers "tied it up with singing about Sheffield", where Murphy first ventured into music, "and leaving a small town and going and making myself [...] that part of your life where you make yourself, where it comes time to do your own nurturing and decisions."

According to Murphy, the track was probably the most difficult song on the album to finish: "We were there writing it thinking, 'it's cheesy, but it's so strong.' So we kept going with it. The whole track was in a different key, I kept singing it and it never felt right, and then I said, 'well, stick it in another key and transpose it and I'll re-sing it.' So he [Barratt] transposed it and we got this gender-bent vocal sound going and we haven't replaced it because we couldn't live without it. It felt like a perfect foil against the song."

== Live performances ==
Murphy first performed the track live on The Graham Norton Show on 2 October 2020. Industry title Music Week noted her appearance on the chat show amid record labels vying for reduced music performance slots, due to the impact of the coronavirus pandemic on television programming. During her tour in support of the album, Murphy instead performed "We Are the Law" (a remixed mashup with "We Got Together"), taken from her remix album Crooked Machine.

== Track listing ==
Single version

1. "Murphy's Law" (Extended Mix) – 8:00
2. "Murphy's Law" (Edit) – 3:50

Album version

1. "Murphy's Law" – 6:51

Crooked Mixes

1. "Murphy's Law" (Crooked Cowbelly 1) – 8:57
2. "Murphy's Law" (Crooked Cowbelly 2) – 8:01
3. "Murphy's Law" (Murphy's Big Dub) – 11:05
4. "Murphy's Law" (Murphy's Tones) – 9:53

Cosmodelica Remix

1. "Murphy's Law" (Cosmodelica Remix) – 7:43
2. "Murphy's Law" (Cosmodelica Remix) [Edit] – 3:56

== Credits and personnel ==
Credits are adapted from the liner notes of Róisín Machine.

- Róisín Murphy – songwriter, lead vocals
- Richard Barratt – songwriter, producer
- Dean Honer – songwriter, additional engineering
- Michael Ward – songwriter, backing vocals
- David Lewin – engineer
- Randy Merrill – mastering
- Rhianna Kenny – backing vocals
- Nesreen Shah – backing vocals
- Philly Smith – backing vocals

== Charts ==
Chart performance for "Murphy's Law"
Chart (2020)	Peak position
UK Singles Downloads (OCC)	91

== Release history ==
Release dates and formats for "Murphy's Law"
Region	Date	Format(s)	Version	Label(s)	Ref.
Various	4 March 2020	Digital download; streaming	Single	Skint	
Various	17 April 2020	Digital download; streaming	Crooked mixes	Skint	
Various	29 May 2020	Digital download; streaming	Cosmodelica remix	Skint	
Various	2 October 2020	Digital download; streaming; 12-inch vinyl; CD	Album version	Skint	
