= Lavagance =

Slovak indie pop band

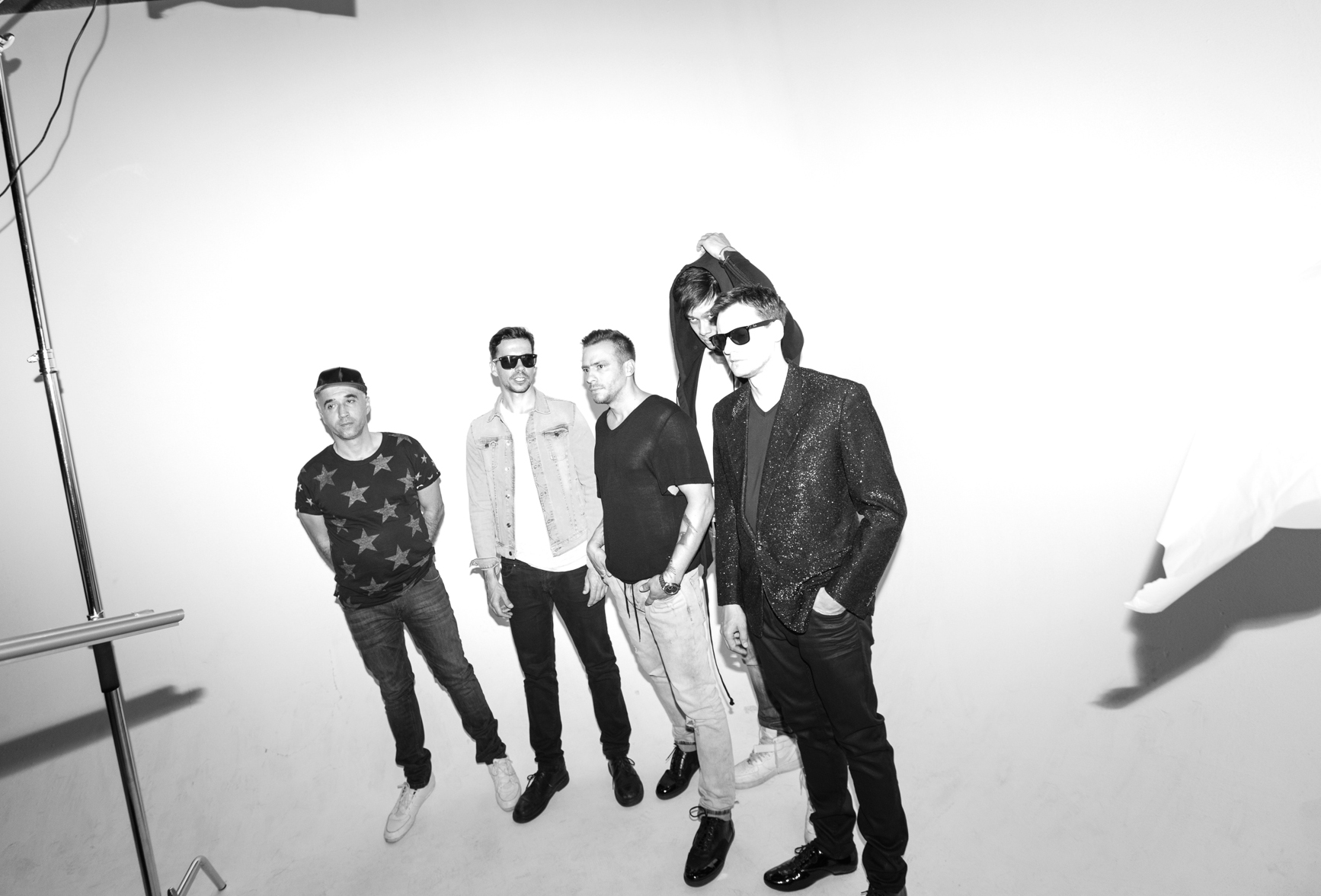

Background information
- Origin: Bratislava, Slovakia
- Genres: Indie pop, alternative pop, new wave
- Years active: 2006–present
- Members: Marek Rakovický; Vincent NY; Viliam Bujnovský; Robert Dando; Mario Vasko
- Website: lavagance.com

Lavagance is a Slovak indie pop band based in Bratislava.

== Members ==
- Marek Rakovický: lead vocal, guitar
- Vincent Susol: bass guitar, vocals
- Viliam Bujnovský: keyboards
- Robert Dando: drums
- Mario Smashing: guitar, backing vocals, keyboards

== History ==
Lavagance's music is frequently a mix of pop elements, indie rock and electronics. Lavagance was founded in 2005 in Bratislava. In 2006, they released their first EP, Back to Attraction, containing six songs. The video for the song "Miles", directed by Brano Spacek, was in rotation on MTV Europe. In 2006, the group received an Aurel Award for best alternative album, best video for the song "Miles" and the award for best new artist. In 2007, the band released its second studio album, Orthodox Experience, which was declared the best Slovak album by Radio FM listeners. In 2008 the band announced its cooperation with British keyboardist, record producer, composer and arranger, Eddie Stevens best known for co-writing, arranging and touring with the UK groups Freakpower (with Norman Cook aka Fat Boy Slim); Moloko (as of 2000); and Zero 7.> The first result of this collaboration was the song "Blood" in 2009, followed by the studio album I Like This Temper. The next album, released in 2009, was a studio recording Divine Darkness, this time produced by the band itself. Their album Halfway to the Grave from 2015, includes the successful singles "Gabriel", the "Princess of the Light", or "Make me Smile". The greatest successes of the group have been guest appearances on concert tours with bands like Duran Duran (Astronaut tour 2006 and All You Need Is Now Tour 2012), Depeche Mode (Tour of the Universe 2009 and Delta Machine Tour 2013) and Mando Diao (Give Me Fire Tour 2009).

The five members of Lavagance represent various musical styles from indie pop, combining energetic guitars and electronica. Their concerts are accompanied by a diverse and varied composition, that includes everything from hard rhythms to the dreamy mood.

== Discography ==
- 2006 Back to Attraction (EP)
- 2007 Orthodox Experience
- 2009 Divine Darkness
- 2009 I Like This Temper
- 2015 Halfway to The Grave
