= Take Her Up to Monto =

Studio album by Róisín Murphy
- Released: 8 July 2016
- Recorded: 2014–2016
- Studio: The Damp Squid and RMS, London; Fish Factory, London (Note: Additional recording)
- Genre: Electronic; art pop; dance-pop
- Length: 46:58
- Label: Play It Again Sam
- Producer: Eddie Stevens

Róisín Murphy chronology
Hairless Toys (2015)	Take Her Up to Monto (2016)	Róisín Machine (2020)

Singles from Take Her Up to Monto
- 1. "Ten Miles High" Released: 17 May 2016; 2. "Whatever" Released: 23 September 2016

Professional ratings
Aggregate scores
Source	Rating
AnyDecentMusic?	7.5/10
Metacritic	77/100
Review scores
Source	Rating
AllMusic	4/5 stars
Clash	9/10
Drowned in Sound	8/10
The Guardian	3/5 stars
Mixmag	8/10
Mojo	4/5 stars
Now	3/5 stars
Pitchfork	7.8/10
The Quietus	Very positive
Uncut	4/5 stars

Take Her Up to Monto is the fourth solo studio album by Irish singer Róisín Murphy. It was released on 8 July 2016 by Play It Again Sam. The album was co-produced with longtime collaborator Eddie Stevens during the same five-week session period that resulted in Murphy's previous album, Hairless Toys (2015).

== Background ==
Take Her Up to Monto was recorded during the same sessions as Murphy's 2015 album Hairless Toys, and included producer and longtime collaborator Eddie Stevens. The title is derived from an Irish folk song of the same name, popularised by The Dubliners in the 1960s, which Murphy's father sang to her as a child. Monto is the nickname of Dublin's old red-light district.

The album's release was preceded by two tracks, "Mastermind" and "Ten Miles High", as well as Murphy's self-directed video for the latter, which was filmed in London. Comparing the album with its predecessor, Murphy stated that "the visual language has changed. Less reference, a more aggressively modern aesthetic. It's about the London that I live in, it's a lot about architecture, it's about building and the future coming, its about here! It's a bit fizzier and more present tense, irreverent, with guerilla filming, montage and crazy shit. I hope it's a realism that makes you feel good about being alive."

== Critical reception ==
Take Her Up to Monto received generally positive reviews from critics. At Metacritic, which assigns a normalised rating out of 100 to reviews from mainstream publications, the album received an average score of 77, based on 21 reviews. Mixmag described the album as "another reminder of why [Murphy] has more charm, chutzpah and ideas than most of her peers put together," calling it "a complex and endlessly enjoyable record." Now described it as "an album of extremes, following its own wandering logic," suggesting "it feels as though she wants to see how much she can reduce her theatrical pop image into something small and seemingly impermanent." In Exclaim!, Anna Alger wrote "Her songs on this record often feel like symphonies, with multiple movements evolving throughout a five-to-seven-minute period."

== Track listing ==
All tracks are written by Róisín Murphy and Eddie Stevens.

No.	Title	Length
1.	"Mastermind"	6:35
2.	"Pretty Gardens"	5:07
3.	"Thoughts Wasted"	5:22
4.	"Lip Service"	4:27
5.	"Ten Miles High"	5:19
6.	"Whatever"	2:53
7.	"Romantic Comedy"	5:36
8.	"Nervous Sleep"	7:41
9.	"Sitting and Counting"	3:57

== Personnel ==
Credits adapted from the liner notes of Take Her Up to Monto.

=== Musicians ===
- Róisín Murphy – lead vocals (all tracks); backing vocals (tracks 2, 6)
- Eddie Stevens – all keyboards, male vocals; programming (all tracks); percussion, flutes, guitar (track 3); violin (tracks 3, 4); floor toms (track 6)
- Rhianna Kenny – backing vocals (tracks 2, 4, 6)
- Jodie Scantlebury – backing vocals (tracks 2, 4, 6)
- Rob Mullarkey – bass (track 2)
- Dave De Rose – drums (tracks 2, 5); floor toms (track 6)
- Jamie McCredie – guitar (tracks 4, 5)
- Ally McNeil – additional programming (track 5)

=== Technical ===
- Eddie Stevens – production
- Mark Allaway – additional recording (at Fish Factory, London)
- Darius van Helfteren – mastering (at Amsterdam Mastering, Amsterdam)

=== Artwork ===
- Róisín Murphy – design, art direction, video concept, video direction
- Ian Anderson – design, art direction
- Ben Wearing – director of photography
- Katie Lambert – video production

== Charts ==
Chart (2016)	Peak position
Australian Albums (ARIA)	73
Austrian Albums (Ö3 Austria)	45
Belgian Albums (Ultratop Flanders)	40
Belgian Albums (Ultratop Wallonia)	153
Croatian International Albums (HDU)	39
Dutch Albums (Album Top 100)	65
German Albums (Offizielle Top 100)	62
Greek Albums (IFPI)	63
Irish Albums (IRMA)	22
Irish Independent Albums (IRMA)	5
Scottish Albums (OCC)	45
Swiss Albums (Schweizer Hitparade)	26
UK Albums (OCC)	41
UK Independent Albums (OCC)	10
US Top Dance Albums (Billboard)	8
