= Divine Darkness =

Studio album by Lavagance
- Released: 2009
- Genre: Alternative rock

Lavagance chronology
Orthodox Experience (2007)	Divine Darkness (2009)	I Like This Temper (2009)

Divine Darkness is the third studio album of the Slovak band Lavagance. The album was recorded at Lavagance studio and released under the Lavagance label on 1 April 2009.

== Track list ==
1. "It Happened That Night"
2. "Blood from God's Side"
3. "I See You in My Dreams"
4. "Divine Sobriety"
5. "Young, Talented and Gone"
6. "That Face is Me"
7. "Redemption"
8. "Days of our Lives"
9. "Leaving"
10. "Wings Spreadin' Wide"
11. "Hellbent"
12. "Time to be Hurt"
13. (Bonus Track)

== Personnel ==
- Marek Rakovický - vocals, guitar, programming, keyboards
- Vincent Susol - bass guitar, vocals
- Viliam Bujnovský - keyboards, programming
- Marek Gregor - drums, vocals, programming
- Mario Smashing - guitar, vocals, keyboards
- Peter Rakovický - keyboards, programming & sound engineering
