= Rihanna (book) =

2010 photo-book by Rihanna and Simon Henwood

- Author: Rihanna; Simon Henwood
- Original title: Rihanna: The Last Girl on Earth
- Language: English
- Publisher: Rizzoli Publications
- Publication date: October 15, 2010
- Publication place: United States; United Kingdom
- Media type: Paperback; hardcover
- Pages: 144
- ISBN: 978-0-8478-3510-2

Rihanna (originally titled and alternatively known as Rihanna: The Last Girl on Earth) is a coffee table photo-book by Barbadian singer Rihanna and British artist Simon Henwood. Henwood envisioned the project as the depiction of a "journey", as it includes professional and candid photos by him, that show the singer's fourth studio album, Rated R's (2009) promotional campaign, alongside pictures from other live appearances. The publication features a preface written by French designer Alexandre Vauthier.

It was first issued in the United States as a hardcover edition including a CD, on October 15, 2010; also being released in paperback formats and a deluxe hardcover edition including a crystal monogrammed clamshell and a signed image print. To promote the book, Rihanna appeared at a Barnes & Noble store where she signed copies of it. Editors commented on the book positively, favoring Rihanna's looks and Henwood's photography.

== Background and concept ==
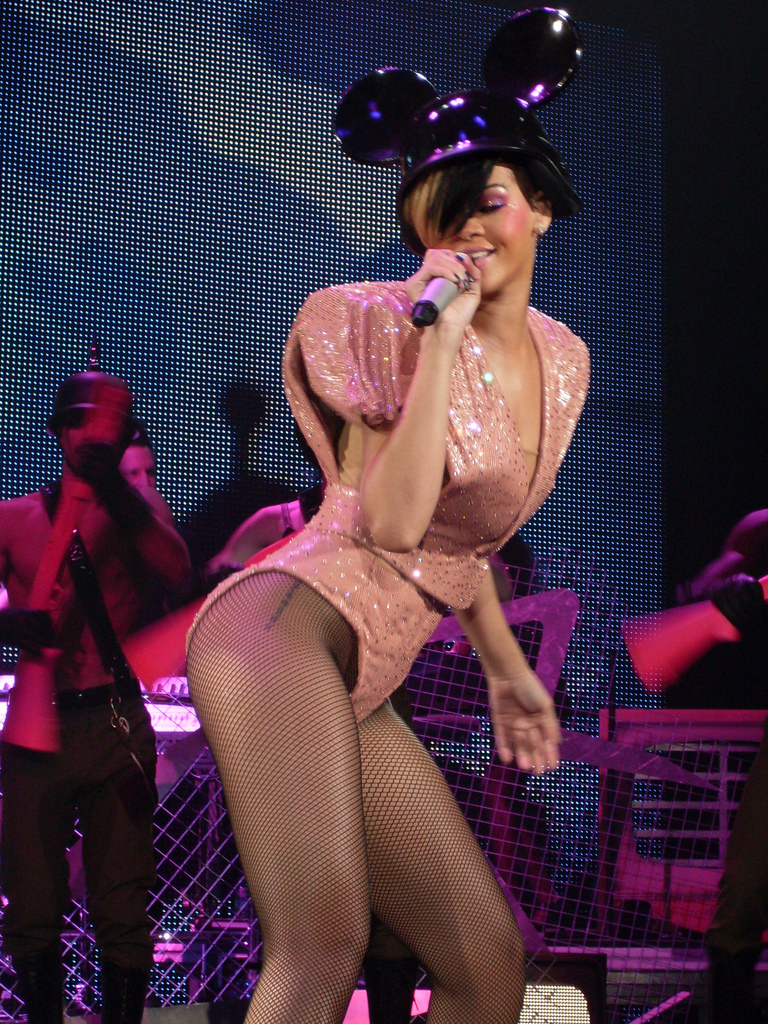
The book includes photographs taken during Rihanna's second world tour, Last Girl on Earth.

In November 2009, Rihanna released her fourth studio album Rated R through Def Jam Recordings, to critical and commercial success. Following was a year-long world tour, titled Last Girl on Earth. In January 2010, details about a Rihanna photo book were revealed, including its initial title—Rihanna: The Last Girl On Earth—and a tentative date, on June 29 of that year.

During an interview with website MuuMuse, the book's photographer and British artist Simon Henwood, who also served as the creative director during the promotional campaign for Rated R, spoke on the concept and purpose of the publication. He revealed that the book was created in order to show the events of that promotional era, and while he did not envision the project as a "diary", he described it as a "picture book of everything that happens when you're building [something] like this, so things people had not seen of her." Having spent a long period of time with Rihanna on diverse locations, such as "fashion shows, on set, hotel rooms" amongst others, Henwood told MuuMuse that it depicted the "journey from the initial design of the logo and concept of the album to the singer embarking on the Last Girl on Earth Tour.

As a result, Rihanna includes photos of the singer taken during the Paris Fashion Week; during the Rated R photoshoot done by Ellen von Unwerth in Berlin; candid pictures and pictures of her American Music Awards live performance. The last photos of the publication were taken by Henwood during the European leg of the Last Girl on Earth Tour in April 2010. Aside from the pictures, the book also includes a preface written by French designer Alexandre Vauthier, in which he praises the singer and describes their encounter.

The date was then rescheduled from June 2010 to September of that year. Rihanna said to MTV:

I think it was really special to have behind-the-scenes photos, you know, pictures that the fans haven't seen before, all together of a very specific moment of my life, an album of my life. They just get to see all the things that they hadn't seen that were going on behind the scenes; really cool stuff, not typical. They're really fun photos. And even for me, when I look at them, they say so much. Photos really tell a thousand words.

== Release and reception ==
A 144-page book, Rihanna was released on October 15, 2010 in the United States under Rizzoli Publications, on hardcover format, including a CD with a song from Rated R; four days later, the paperback format was issued in the United States, Germany, and France. Both editions were released in the United Kingdom on October 20, 2010, under the original title Rihanna: The Last Girl on Earth. Four days later, the paperback format was issued in the United States. On October 26, 2010, a deluxe edition of the photo-book was released, including the hardcover edition "encased in a Swarovski crystal monogrammed clamshell" alongside a print with an image from "Rude Boy"'s music video shoot, signed by Rihanna. Imported versions of the book were sold in Portugal starting February 2012.

Rihanna appeared at the Fifth Avenue store of Barnes & Noble, in which she signed copies of the photo-book, dressed in a "floral-print" dress. Editors who commented on the book were positive about it. At E!, Marc Malkin praised Henwood's professional photography, which he deemed "absolutely gorgeous". At Rap-Up, editors favored Rihanna's looks, writing that in the pictures, she was "at the height of her beauty and ferocity". Rebecca Thomas of MTV had a similar opinion, stating: "The 22-year-old stunner [Rihanna] shines in front of the camera and perhaps never more so than in the images that capture [her]".

== Release history ==
Region	Date	Format	Publisher
United States	October 15, 2010	Hardcover	Rizzoli Publications
United States	October 19, 2010	Paperback	Rizzoli Publications
Germany	October 19, 2010	Paperback	Rizzoli Publications
France	October 19, 2010	Paperback	Rizzoli Publications
United Kingdom	October 20, 2010	Hardcover; paperback	Rizzoli Publications
United States	October 26, 2010	Hardcover	Rizzoli Publications
Portugal	February 2012	Paperback	Rizzoli Publications
