= Orthodox Experience =

Studio album by Lavagance
- Released: 2007
- Genre: Alternative rock
- Label: Lavagance

Lavagance chronology
Back to Attraction (2006)	Orthodox Experience (2007)	Divine Darkness (2009)

Orthodox Experience is a studio album of the Slovak band Lavagance. In November 2007, the album was recorded in the Lavagance studio and released under the Lavagance label.

== Track listing ==
1. "Orthodox Experience"
2. "Like a Butterfly"
3. "Vision"
4. "Cruel Games"
5. "I Like This Temper"
6. "Purification"
7. "Small Town Melody"
8. "Albino Planet"
9. "I Had a Dream"
10. "Wish to Leave"
11. "Pure Pioneer"

== Reception ==
In January 2008, the album Orthodox Experience was voted Best Slovak Album of 2007 by Rádio FM. listeners. In spring 2008, Lavagance toured in support of the album, appearing in 10 Slovak cities.

== Personnel ==
- Marek Rakovický - vocals, guitar, programming, keyboards
- Vincent Susol - bass guitar, vocals
- Viliam Bujnovský - keyboards, programming
- Marek Gregor - drums, vocals, programming
- Mario Smashing - guitar, vocals, keyboards
- Peter Rakovický - keyboards, programming & sound engineering
