= Sequins 2 =

EP by Róisín Murphy
- Released: 14 February 2005
- Studio: The Dairy (London)
- Genres: Pop, alternative dance, avant-pop, electronica, nu jazz, glitch
- Label: Echo (ECSY #161)
- Producers: Matthew Herbert, Róisín Murphy

Róisín Murphy chronology
Sequins 1 (2005)	Sequins 2 (2005)	Sequins 3 (2005)

Sequins 2 is a limited edition extended play by Irish singer Róisín Murphy. It was released by Echo Records on 12-inch vinyl in February 2005.

== Songs ==
The opening track "Sow into You" uses a metaphor of rain and harvests to describe love and sex, atop a baroque pop brass arrangement. The third track "Dear Diary" is a torch song mixing northern soul with disco music with the sounds of doorbells and telephones ringing. The extended play closes with "Leaving the City", which slowly builds up during the introduction and uses out of tune instrumentation and a repetitive chorus.

== Cover artwork ==
The cover of Sequins 2 was painted by Simon Henwood. Murphy met Henwood in a pub, and Henwood, who was known for his simplified paintings of teenagers, thought that she would be a good subject for a painting. Henwood came to Murphy's house the next week and, while they were looking through her wardrobe, decided to have her dressed in sequins. Murphy positioned her body in abstract shapes for Henwood to paint. She developed a character, which Henwood described as a "disco electro pop diva with a 1940s look". His canvases were displayed at The Hospital in Victoria, London, and Murphy purchased them "for [her] kids so they can see what [she] once looked like."

"Sow into You" (2005)
A brassy baroque pop song using a metaphor of rain and harvesting.

== Track listing ==
All tracks written and composed by Róisín Murphy and Matthew Herbert.

1. "Sow into You" – 3:56
2. "Love in the Making" – 5:06
3. "Dear Diary" – 5:50
4. "Leaving the City" – 4:49

== Personnel ==
The following people contributed to Sequins 2:

- Róisín Murphy – vocals, production
- Matthew Herbert – guitar, bass, keyboards, banjo, production
- Dave O'Higgins – saxophone
- Trevor Mires – trombone
- Pete Wraight – trumpet, flute
- Max De Wardener – bass
- Geoff Smith – dulcimer
- Simon Henwood – art direction
- Steffan Macmillan – design
