= Back to Attraction =

EP by Lavagance
- Released: 2006
- Genre: Alternative rock
- Label: Agentúra Pohoda

Lavagance chronology
Back to Attraction (2006)	Orthodox Experience (2007)

Back to Attraction is the first studio album of the Slovak band Lavagance. The EP, recorded at Lavagance studio, was released in 2006 by the label Agentúra Pohoda.

== Track list ==
1. "Miles"
2. "Best Friend's Girl"
3. "Back to Attraction"
4. "Midnight Letter Writing"
5. "Poetry of September"
6. "Everything"

== Bonuses ==
Along with MP3 versions of the six tracks, Back to Attraction includes photos and the music video of "Miles” (directed by Braňo Špaček). The re-release of the album also contained the Osho remix of “Miles”.

== Reception ==
In 2006, the singles "Miles", "Back to Attraction", and "My Best Friend's Girl" were released. Lavagance won three Aurel Awards for Best Alternative Album, Best Video ("Miles") and Best New Group.

== Personnel ==
- Marek Rakovický – electric guitar, vocals, keyboards (1–6)
- Viliam Bujnovský – keyboards
- Vincent Susol – bass guitar (1–6), keyboards
- Laco Kováč – drums (1–3), vocals (1–4, 6)
- Radovan Al Zafari – acoustic guitar (3)
- Peter Raitl – percussion (2, 3)
