= Hit Parade (Róisín Murphy album) =

2023 studio album by Róisín Murphy

Studio album by Róisín Murphy
- Released: 8 September 2023
- Length: 58:23
- Label: Ninja Tune
- Producer: DJ Koze

Róisín Murphy chronology
Crooked Machine (2021)	Hit Parade (2023)

Singles from Hit Parade
- 1. "CooCool" Released: 8 March 2023; 2. "The Universe" Released: 17 May 2023; 3. "Fader" Released: 20 June 2023; 4. "You Knew" Released: 18 July 2023

Hit Parade is the sixth solo studio album by Irish singer Róisín Murphy, released on 8 September 2023 through Ninja Tune. It was produced by DJ Koze and was preceded by the singles "CooCool", "Can't Replicate" (exclusively as a 12-inch single), "The Universe", "Fader" and "You Knew". "CooCool" was released alongside Murphy's announcement she had signed to Ninja Tune. Murphy played select shows in North America following the album's release.

The album received acclaim from critics, with some calling it her best work yet and one of the best records of the year. Several critics acknowledged and felt that Murphy's August 2023 leaked private Facebook comment about puberty blockers and young trans people had negatively affected the preceding "goodwill" toward the album. Hit Parade became Murphy's highest charting album on the UK Albums Chart, peaking in the top five, and debuted in the top ten in Germany as well as the top twenty in Belgium, Ireland and Switzerland.

The remix album Hit Parade Remixes was released on 24 May 2024.

== Background and recording ==
In a statement, Murphy expressed that the music was worked on remotely, with her in London and DJ Koze in Hamburg, over the course of several years, and "both [were] in a personal, private place when working on the songs", which "brought out a more intimate approach to the songwriting" for Murphy and allowed her to tell "this album [her] secrets", and Koze had "total freedom" and was not "distracted by [her] presence". She called the resulting album "joyful" as she has "never been happier", and the music "so vibrant and alive" and "exploding with colour".

"The House" samples dialogue between Murphy and Irish comedian Tommy Tiernan taken from her appearance on his chat show.

Murphy was photographed by Connor Egan, who they collaborated together with AI generative artist Beth Frey on the colourful artwork, with Bráulio Amado serving as graphic designer.

== Critical reception ==
Professional ratings
Aggregate scores
Source	Rating
AnyDecentMusic?	8.3/10
Metacritic	87/100
Review scores
Source	Rating
AllMusic	4/5 stars
Clash	9/10
The Daily Telegraph	4/5 stars
The Guardian	5/5 stars
Mojo	4/5 stars
NME	4/5 stars
Pitchfork	8.2/10
PopMatters	7/10
Slant Magazine	4/5 stars
Uncut	9/10

Hit Parade received a score of 87 out of 100 on review aggregator Metacritic based on 13 critics' reviews, indicating "universal acclaim". Sophia McDonald of Clash called it "as colourful and playful as Róisín Murphy herself. Truly a contender for album of the year, Murphy has created an album of true musical depth that doesn't take itself too seriously", and Uncut stated, "bursting with warmth and character even when nearly tweaked beyond the point of recognition, Murphy's voice has rarely had a more satisfying showcase".

Mojo called the track "Fader" evidence "that [Murphy] could do out-and-out pop if the mood were ever to take her, but there are too many strange and good ideas for anything quite so prosaic". Peter Piatkowski, reviewing the album for PopMatters, wrote that "there are some great moments on the record, but overall, Hit Parade is a bit inconsistent; its title is false advertising. It's a frustratingly uneven album, with just enough genius to make the mediocrity on some tracks stand out".

Reviewing the album for Pitchfork, Harry Tafoya described it as "the kind of highly original pop assemblage that the Irish singer has seemingly always wanted to make, a record of peerless highs whose best and worst quality is how alienating it just so happens to be." Pitchfork also granted the album's first two singles, "CooCool" and "The Universe", Best New Track status. Jordan Bassett of NME summarised it as "a playful record imbued with a sense of mystery and occasional glimpses of autobiography, slowly revealing itself as the cracked mirror image of Róisín Machine's bruised optimism."

Shaad D'Souza of The Saturday Paper wrote that "for Róisín Murphy, becoming the world's most fabulous and daringly experimental living pop star has taken a long time", calling the album "a masterclass in unfussy pop – her best record yet and maybe the album of the year".

== Track listing ==
Hit Parade track listing
No.	Title	Writer(s)	Length
1.	"What Not to Do"	DJ Koze; Mad Professor; Róisín Murphy	5:02
2.	"CooCool"	Koze; Mike James Kirkland; Murphy	4:31
3.	"The Universe"	Dirk Berger; Koze; Murphy	4:05
4.	"Hurtz So Bad"	Koze; Murphy	4:37
5.	"The House"	Koze; Murphy	3:32
6.	"Spacetime"	Koze; Murphy; Tadhg Properzi	0:30
7.	"Fader"	Lawrence Gordon; Wayne Kaliff Gordon; Koze; Murphy; Derek Nievergelt	4:23
8.	"Free Will"	Koze; Murphy	6:22
9.	"You Knew"	Koze; Mad Professor; Murphy	7:16
10.	"Can't Replicate"	Koze; Murphy	7:28
11.	"Crazy Ants Reprise"	Koze; Murphy	1:28
12.	"Two Ways"	Koze; Murphy	4:26
13.	"Eureka"	Koze; Murphy	4:43
Total length:			58:23

Hit Parade Remixes track listing
No.	Title	Length
1.	"The House" (System Olympia remix)	6:42
2.	"The House" (Ruf Dug remix)	5:22
3.	"Can't Replicate" (Baba Ali remix)	5:30
4.	"Can't Replicate" (Hernán Cattáneo & Mercurio remix)	10:27
5.	"CooCool" (club mix)	6:19
6.	"CooCool" (Suricata remix)	6:25
7.	"You Knew" (Payfone remix)	7:26
8.	"You Knew" (Eli Escobar remix)	5:53
9.	"What Not to Do" (Moodymann remix)	5:16
Total length:		59:28

Notes

- "Spacetime" is a separate, unmixed track on the digital edition, whereas it is mixed as an intro to "Fader" on all physical editions. The deluxe vinyl version includes an additional song, "Milf Funk" (5:10) between "The Universe" and "Hurtz So Bad".
- "CooCool" contains a sample of "Together" by Mike James Kirkland.
- "Fader" contains a sample of "Window Shopping" by Sharon Jones and the Dap-Kings.
- The physical CD/LP version available from Rough Trade includes a bonus disc featuring a live performance at the Royal Albert Hall.

== Personnel ==
- Róisín Murphy – vocals, recording, creative direction
- DJ Koze – production engineering, recording (all tracks); mixing (tracks 1, 2, 4–11, 13)
- Deinklang – mastering
- Philipp Hoppen – mixing (tracks 3, 12)
- Tadhg Properzi – guest vocals (track 6)
- Beth Frey – art
- Bráulio Amado – design
- Connor Egan – photography

== Charts ==
Chart performance for Hit Parade
Chart (2023)	Peak position
Australian Albums (ARIA)	95
Austrian Albums (Ö3 Austria)	51
Belgian Albums (Ultratop Flanders)	16
Belgian Albums (Ultratop Wallonia)	68
Dutch Albums (Album Top 100)	54
German Albums (Offizielle Top 100)	6
Irish Albums (OCC)	11
Irish Independent Albums (IRMA)	1
Polish Physical Albums (ZPAV)	47
Scottish Albums (OCC)	4
Spanish Albums (Promusicae)	88
Swiss Albums (Schweizer Hitparade)	12
Swiss Albums (Romandie)	16
UK Albums (OCC)	5
UK Dance Albums (OCC)	1
UK Independent Albums (OCC)	1
US Top Album Sales (Billboard)	40
US Top Dance/Electronic Albums (Billboard)	13

Chart performance for Hit Parade Remixes
Chart (2024)	Peak position
UK Album Downloads (OCC)	60
