= Sequins 1 =

EP by Róisín Murphy
- Released: 10 January 2005
- Studio: The Dairy (London)
- Genre: Pop, alternative dance, avant-pop, nu jazz, glitch
- Label: Echo (ECSY #158)
- Producer: Matthew Herbert, Róisín Murphy

Róisín Murphy chronology
| Sequins 1 (2005) | Sequins 2 (2005) |

Sequins 1 is a limited edition extended play by Irish singer Róisín Murphy. It was released by Echo Records on 12-inch vinyl in January 2005.

== Songs ==
The opening track uses overdriven guitar parts and layers of overdubbed vocals. Its lyrics caution a woman who has become out of control and its title was chosen to contrast feelings of passion and melancholy. "Off on It", a more experimental song with an unsteady rhythm, precedes Night of the Dancing Flame", which combines synthesizers with 1920s jazz. It is written in waltz time and was compared to Stevie Wonder's work during his peak. The extended play closes with "Through Time", which opens with noises such as rustling and coughing, and then proceeds into a ballad that was compared to those by Carole King.

== Cover artwork ==
The cover of Sequins 1 was painted by Simon Henwood. Murphy met Henwood in a pub, and Henwood, who was known for his simplified paintings of teenagers, thought that she would be a good subject for a painting. Henwood came to Murphy's house the next week and, while they were looking through her wardrobe, decided to have her dressed in sequins. Murphy positioned her body in abstract shapes for Henwood to paint. She developed a character, which Henwood described as a "disco electro pop diva with a 1940s look". His canvases were displayed at The Hospital in Victoria, London, and Murphy purchased them "for [her] kids so they can see what [she] once looked like."

== Track listing ==
All tracks written and composed by Róisín Murphy and Matthew Herbert.

1. "Ruby Blue" – 2:48
2. "Off on It" – 5:22
3. "Night of the Dancing Flame" – 3:26
4. "Through Time" – 5:58

== Personnel ==
The following people contributed to Sequins 1:

- Róisín Murphy – vocals, production
- Matthew Herbert – guitar, bass, keyboards, synthesizer, production
- Dave O'Higgins – saxophone
- Trevor Mires – trombone
- Pete Wraight – trumpet
- Max De Wardener – bass
- Phil Parnell – keyboards
- Geoff Smith – percussion
- Simon Henwood – art direction
- Steffan Macmillan – design
