= Crooked Machine =

Remix album by Róisín Murphy
- Released: 30 April 2021
- Genre: House; techno
- Length: 58:45
- Label: Skint; BMG
- Producer: Richard Barratt

Róisín Murphy chronology
Róisín Machine (2020)	Crooked Machine (2021)	Hit Parade (2023)

Singles from Crooked Machine
- 1. "Assimilation" Released: 7 April 2021

Crooked Machine is a remix album by Irish singer Róisín Murphy, released 30 April 2021 by Skint Records. It consists of remixes of songs from her 2020 studio album Róisín Machine.

== Background ==
Crooked Machine features nine remixes of songs from Róisín Machine, created by Murphy's frequent collaborator, Crooked Man (also known as DJ Parrot or Richard Barratt). About their partnership and the remix album, Murphy stated

Parrot doesn't try to be 'cool', I reckon that's the last thing on his mind. He makes music with a real sense of responsibility to the craft. He just cannot make rubbish music, he’d be too ashamed. So everything he is and everything he has learned, is put into everything he does. I think Crooked Machine is one of his greatest achievements so far. I left him and Fat Dave to their own devices on this and they have outdone themselves! I absolutely love it!! I think I prefer it to the original album, slightly less me and all the more 'cool' for it!

The remix album's sound, according to a press release is as "If Róisín Machine was the big night out…this is the afterparty where things get darker and more twisted".

== Release ==
The album was first released digitally on 30 April 2021, with a vinyl release on 12 June for Record Store Day 2021.

== Critical reception ==
Professional ratings
Review scores
Source	Rating
AllMusic	4/5 stars
Albumism	5/5 stars
Pitchfork	7.7/10

Shaad D'Souza of Pitchfork gave Crooked Machine a 7.7 score, commending it for "present[ing] a new embodiment of the Róisín Machine ethos - a testament to the transformative power of the dancefloor, redone in shades of house and techno altogether darker and a touch more modern than its predecessor", also praising Barratt's reworkings for "highlight[ing] the durability and versatility of Murphy's art - placing her in contexts both more modern and more abstract, and still letting her come out on top".

== Track listing ==
All tracks are written by Richard Barratt and Róisín Murphy, except where noted. All tracks are produced by Richard Barratt

Crooked Machine track listing
No.	Title	Writer(s)	Length
1.	"Kingdom of Machines"		6:28
2.	"Echo Returns"		5:55
3.	"Capable Rhythm"		6:06
4.	"Assimilation"	Michael Ward; Barratt; Murphy	6:54
5.	"Crooked Madame"		7:15
6.	"Less Is More"	Amy Douglas; Barratt; Murphy	6:41
7.	"Name Changer"		5:49
8.	"We Are the Law"	Dean Honer; Ward; Barratt; Murphy	6:12
9.	"Hardcore Jealousy"		7:25
Total length:			58:45

== Charts ==
Chart performance for Crooked Machine
Chart (2021)	Peak position
UK Album Downloads (OCC)	21
UK Albums Sales (OCC)	58
UK Vinyl Albums (OCC)	35
UK Independent Albums (OCC)	19
UK Dance Albums (OCC)	2
