= Mi Senti =

EP by Róisín Murphy
- Released: 26 May 2014
- Recorded: 2013–2014; North London and Ibiza
- Genre: Electronica, nu jazz, alternative dance, pop
- Length: 28:05
- Language: Italian
- Label: The Vinyl Factory (ECSY #158)
- Producer: Eddie Stevens, Róisín Murphy, Sebastian Properzi

Róisín Murphy chronology
Live at Ancienne Belgique 19.11.07 (2007)	Mi Senti (2014)	Hairless Toys (2015)

Professional ratings
Review scores
Source	Rating
The Line of Best Fit	6.5/10
NOW Magazine	NNNN

Mi Senti (Italian for "you hear me" or "you feel me") is an EP released by Irish electronic musician Róisín Murphy in May 2014.

== Overview ==
The extended play, the physical edition of which is a limited issue of 1000 copies, was released by The Vinyl Factory. It consists of covers of classic Italian pop songs as well as an original track entitled "In sintesi" produced by long-time musical collaborator Eddie Stevens. Two remix bundles of the album (available as a digital download and 12" vinyl) were released on 25 June and 10 September respectively.

Murphy commented on the official site for the EP that she "does not speak a word of Italian", admitting that although aided by her partner, Italian producer Sebastiano Properzi, "the correct pronunciation of the words along with understanding and conveying the meaning was difficult and tedious". She credited the songs with inspiring her to "exercise" her vocals and make them "bigger". Murphy also felt that her role in music is as a muse for the people she works with and highlighted this dynamic as affecting the recording of the EP, calling it a "natural disposition" for her since her days as part of Moloko.

== Track listing ==
Mi Senti
No.	Title	Writer(s)	Original artist	Length
1.	"Ancora ancora ancora"	Cristiano Malgioglio; Gian Pietro Felisatti	Mina	5:37
2.	"Pensiero stupendo"	Ivano Fossati	Patty Pravo	4:11
3.	"Ancora tu"	Mogol; Lucio Battisti	Lucio Battisti	5:07
4.	"In sintesi"	Eddie Stevens; Róisín Murphy; Sebastiano Properzi		5:04
5.	"Non credere"	Mogol; Luigi Clausetti; Roberto Soffici	Mina	4:37
6.	"La gatta"	Gino Paoli	Gino Paoli	3:29

Mi Senti Remixed
No.	Title	Length
1.	"In sintesi" (Psychemagik Remix)	7:17
2.	"In sintesi" (The All Seeing I Mix)	5:19
3.	"Ancora ancora ancora" (Severino & Nico De Ceglia Remix)	6:24
4.	"Pensiero stupendo" (Leo Mas & Fabrice Dub)	7:29

Mi Senti Remixed II
No.	Title	Length
1.	"In sintesi" (Psychemagik Remix)	7:17
2.	"Ancora tu" (Daniele Baldelli & Marco Dionigi Wired Mix)	5:14
