= Momma's Place =

Single by Róisín Murphy
- Released: 18 January 2010
- Recorded: 2009
- Genre: Dance
- Length: 4:27
- Label: Mickey Murphy's Daughter

Róisín Murphy singles chronology
"Orally Fixated" (2009)	"Momma's Place" (2010)	"Golden Era" (2012)

"Momma's Place" is a song by Irish recording artist Róisín Murphy, released as a digital single on 18 January 2010.

On 5 January 2010, after finding out the song had leaked to the Internet, Murphy commented on it via Facebook, saying: "I hear there has been a leak of Momma's Place. Oh dear, I am all for the freedom of the internet, it's just that the quality control is sometimes a little amiss... and I'm funny about stuff like that. The rip that is available is not up to scratch." She later uploaded a high-quality version of the track onto her own MySpace and Facebook pages, making its official premiere.

On 25 March 2010, it was announced that Perez Hilton would be teaming up with Murphy and Indaba Music for a "Momma's Place" remix contest. For the contest, fans were allowed to download multiple stems of the song in order to create their own version.

== Track listing ==
1. "Momma's Place" – 4:27
2. "Momma's Place" (Bongo Boys Remix) – 6:16
3. "Momma's Place" (Kanji Kinetic Remix) – 4:50
4. "Momma's Place" (Shake Aletti Remix) – 4:06

== Charts ==
Chart performance for "Momma's Place"
Chart (2010)	Peak position
Belgian Tip Chart (Flanders)	25
UK Indie Singles Chart	27
