= Orally Fixated =

Single by Róisín Murphy
- Released: 16 November 2009
- Recorded: 2009
- Genre: Electropop; glitch
- Length: 4:36
- Label: AWAL; Mickey Murphy's Daughter
- Songwriters: Róisín Murphy; Seiji; FunkinEven
- Producers: Seiji; FunkinEven

Róisín Murphy singles chronology
| "Movie Star" / "Slave to Love" (2008) | "Orally Fixated" (2009) | "Momma's Place" (2010) |

"Orally Fixated" is a song by Irish singer Róisín Murphy. Written by Murphy, Seiji (of Bugz in the Attic) and FunkinEven, the track was released as a digital single on 16 November 2009. On 12 November 2009, The Guardian offered a 48-hour free download of the single on its website.

== Background ==
When asked about the inspiration behind "Orally Fixated" in an interview with Entertainment Weekly, Murphy said:

Well, I was orally fixated during my pregnancy. I had to give up smoking and I was just fixated on what I could put into my mouth instead. So the oral fixation was certainly in my mind, though not for sexual reasons. So that's it really. And of course it's a pop song so you more or less always find a slightly sexual slant on the ideas that are in your brain, because you're writing a pop song. They're kind of sexy. I didn't have the sexual double entendre in my mind. I didn't expect it to be perceived quite as sexually as it has been. I'm actually a bit shy about all that. It surprises me that I wrote a song like that, you know?

== Critical reception ==
"Orally Fixated" received mixed reviews from music critics. Entertainment Weekly writer Joseph Brannigan Lynch noted that the song invokes "the vaguely industrial New Order/Depeche Mode vein of dance-pop", while adding that it "isn't as immediately grabbing as 'Let Me Know,' but Murphy is always at her best when straddling the line between moody electronics and dizzy disco choruses, which is exactly what 'Orally Fixated' does." In a review for Pitchfork Media, Eric Harvey wrote that Murphy and Seiji "try to simultaneously go globular and spare, Seiji filling any empty space with synth stabs and bite-size breakbeats. And, for some reason, a wanky guitar solo toward the end. The whole piece, like the ostensible double-entendre within it, feels strangely scattershot and unsatisfying, especially considering the great work they've done in the past." He also compared the song to Sheryl Lee Ralph's 1984 club hit "In the Evening".

Ben Baglin from Fact magazine felt that musically, the song "doesn't quite hang together. The stripped-down, sassy verses sound fantastic, Murphy's vampish delivery spot-on (hearing that voice is always a treat). But then there's a sudden and jarring shift in key for the chorus, which despite being damned catchy sounds likes it's been lifted from a completely different song and hastily pasted on." Luis Tovar of Pretty Much Amazing commented that the track "sounds like typical Roisin Murphy nosh—gritty, nostalgic, and sometimes underwhelming." Karen Mason of Shout4Music.com opined that "Murphy's seductive voice gives a warmth to the cold, electronic backing track but the arrangement makes it sound more like a remix than the proper version of the record. 'Orally Fixated' will be a Marmite record. Some people are going to love it for its originality, but others are going to find it annoying, repetitive and strange."

== Charts ==
Chart performance for "Orally Fixated"
| Chart (2009) | Peak position |
|---|---|
| UK Indie Singles Chart | 18 |
