= Rhianna (English singer) =

British singer (born 1982)

- Born: Rhianna Hannah Louise Kenny; 1983 (age 42–43)
- Origin: Leeds, West Yorkshire, England
- Genres: R&B; soul
- Occupation: Singer
- Years active: 2002–present
- Label: Sony Music

Rhianna Elizabeth Kenny (born 1982) known mononymously as Rhianna, is an English R&B singer.

== Early life ==
Born to David and Linda Kenny, Rhianna started her career as a backing vocalist for her brother LSK's band. She started her solo career in the 2000s.

== Music ==
=== Solo career (2002–2005) ===
She signed a recording contract with Sony Music to record her debut album, Get On. She was initially successful in the UK and Ireland with her debut single "Oh Baby" reaching number 18 on the UK Singles Chart. However, her second single "Word Love" failed to reach the top 40 and the third, "I Love Every Little Thing About You," missed the top 75 altogether. When the album Get On also failed to reach the UK Albums Chart top 75, it effectively ended her solo career.

She has supported Beverley Knight on her 2003–2004 Who I Am UK tour and was the backing vocalist for trip hop act Faithless during their live performances in 2005.

=== Little Fix (2010–2012) ===
Rhianna is part of a duo named Little Fix. She and Bill Laurence, who is the co-founder of the duo, met on stage. They have recorded a number of songs, namely "Human Love", "Into Your Arms" and "No More Than Now". This duo should not be confused with the similarly named tribute band to Little Mix.

=== (2012–present) ===
She has sung backing vocals for artists such as Lianne La Havas, Faithless, Noisettes, Róisín Murphy, Bryan Ferry, Max Jury, John Newman, Years and Years, Liam Gallagher, Ellie Goulding and Robbie Williams.

== Discography ==
=== Albums ===
Title	Album details	Chart positions	
Title	Album details	UK	Japan
Get On	Released: September 16, 2002 (UK); October 31, 2002 (Japan)	91	46

=== Singles ===
Year	Song	Chart peak positions	Album
Year	Song	UK	Album
2002	"Oh Baby"	18	Get On
2002	"Word Love"	41	Get On
2003	"I Love Every Little Thing About You"	88	Get On
