= Hairless Toys =

Studio album by Róisín Murphy
- Released: 8 May 2015
- Recorded: 2014–2015
- Studio: Clams & Clogs, RMS and Fish Factory, London
- Genre: Electronic; experimental pop; deep house
- Length: 50:24
- Label: Play It Again Sam
- Producer: Eddie Stevens

Róisín Murphy chronology
Mi Senti (2014)	Hairless Toys (2015)	Take Her Up to Monto (2016)

Singles from Hairless Toys
- 1. "Exploitation" Released: 13 April 2015; 2. "Evil Eyes" Released: 15 June 2015; 3. "Unputdownable" Released: 11 December 2015; 4. "House of Glass (Maurice Fulton Remix)" Released: 11 December 2015

Hairless Toys is the third solo studio album by Irish singer Róisín Murphy. It was released on 8 May 2015 by Play It Again Sam. It is Murphy's first full-length release since 2007's Overpowered. The album was nominated for Best Irish Album of 2015 at the Choice Music Prize and the 2015 Mercury Music Prize. In 2016, it was awarded a silver certification from the Independent Music Companies Association, indicating sales of at least 20,000 copies throughout Europe.

== Background ==
The announcement of the album was accompanied by a stream of the first track, "Gone Fishing", which Murphy confirmed was inspired by the 1990 documentary film Paris Is Burning. The album title came to be when Murphy sang the line "Careless Talk" in the title track, but her producer Eddie Stevens misheard it as "Hairless Toys".

A four-minute edit of "Exploitation" was later issued as the first single, with a music video directed by Murphy herself released on 13 April 2015. Murphy commented that the song is about "selling out, manipulation and exploitation within creative work and in a relationship." Murphy later explained that the song "came from being a bit wry, a bit ironic. It's got a bit of a twinkle in its eye. It's not to be taken too seriously."

Speaking about the record, Murphy wrote:

"There was a desire to make an unquestionably refined record. It's multi layered, electronic and live instrumentation, musically it goes to places most pop music never does. It’s emotionally bare and laced with irony. I definitely didn't set out to make something unique per-se but [...] it really is like nothing you've ever heard before. So it's impossible to describe except to say..it's heartfelt."

Murphy directed accompanying music videos for the singles "Exploitation", "Evil Eyes", "Unputdownable" and "House of Glass".

== Composition ==
Harriet Gibsone of The Guardian found "Gone Fishing" contains "Italo-disco [,] house mutations and unusual country diversions". Heather Phares of AllMusic stated second track and second single "Evil Eyes" has an "irresistible groove". Christopher Monk of musicOMH pointed out the "scuttling percussion, Nile Rodgers-esque guitar, [and] atonal piano stabs" of "Exploitation", while Jim Carroll called the lead single "a track where the groove is simple and sparse, works with considerable panache." Phares noted the "synth bass and waggish backing vocals on 'Uninvited Guest'", and called "Exile" "a dreamy bit of torch twang". In her review for Pitchfork, Katherine St. Asaph pointed out that "Exile" is "delivered in a wearied whisper". St. Asaph deemed "Unputdownable" to be "a traditional Murphy extended metaphor—lover as page-turning book", continuing on to say that "'House of Glass' delivers grand statements, often set stark against the music". Monk described "Hairless Toys (Gotta Hurt)" as a "lovely ballad" and thought "Unputdownable" to "end the album on a downer, before it transforms into something quite uplifting".

== Critical reception ==
Professional ratings
Aggregate scores
Source	Rating
AnyDecentMusic?	7.5/10
Metacritic	80/100
Review scores
Source	Rating
AllMusic	4.5/5 stars
Drowned in Sound	8/10
The Guardian	4/5 stars
The Irish Times	4/5 stars
Mixmag	8/10
musicOMH	4/5 stars
NOW	4/5 stars
Pitchfork	7.4/10
The Quietus	Very positive
Uncut	4/5 stars

Hairless Toys received generally positive reviews. At Metacritic, which assigns a normalised rating out of 100 to reviews from mainstream publications, the album received an average score of 80, based on 15 reviews. The Quietus called the album "a complete masterwork", praising Murphy as "still some serious way ahead of her peers." Pitchfork called Hairless Toys "the most cerebral work of Murphy's decades-long career" and described it as "all gleaming and immaculate from a distance, sharp and shattered if you get too close." Heather Phares of AllMusic stated that the album "opts for a more personal approach that is so powerful in part because it's so quiet", declaring it "a welcome return and Murphy's most satisfying album yet". Electronic Beats called the album "a decisive step forward and a definitively experimental pop record, delivered with a confidence that defies the brevity expected of chart fodder."

The Guardian wrote that Hairless Toys is "pure, evocative elegance". Reviewing the album for Canadian newspaper Now, Kevin Ritchie named it the album of the week, writing that it "fuses delicate, slow-burning deep-house-type rhythms with pop twang and the odd bit of glittering glam". Mixmag also noted the album's integration of "elegant deep house [...] country-flecked soul, and idiosyncratic downtempo", and called it "a career high". Writing for The Irish Times, Jim Carroll said the eight-year gap between albums for Murphy "has not lessened her knack for beautifully finessed tunes pulled together with sublime electropop belts and braces." Writing for musicOMH, Christopher Monk wrote that the album is "less interested in snagging listeners' ears with catchy hooks or luring them on to the dancefloor, and more interested in building a strange, compelling atmosphere". Drowned in Sound described the album as "a wonderfully dark and seething record" and a work to "absorb alone".

== Track listing ==
All tracks are written by Róisín Murphy and Eddie Stevens.

No.	Title	Length
1.	"Gone Fishing"	5:57
2.	"Evil Eyes"	6:42
3.	"Exploitation"	9:23
4.	"Uninvited Guest"	5:58
5.	"Exile"	4:00
6.	"House of Glass"	6:52
7.	"Hairless Toys (Gotta Hurt)"	6:18
8.	"Unputdownable"	5:14
Total length:		50:24

== Personnel ==
Credits adapted from the liner notes of Hairless Toys.

=== Musicians ===
- Róisín Murphy – lead vocals (all tracks); backing vocals (tracks 2, 6)
- Eddie Stevens – keys (all tracks); bass (track 2); percussion (track 3); bottleneck guitar (track 5); additional guitar (track 6); whistle (track 4)
- Jamie McCredie – guitar
- Dave De Rose – drums (all tracks); ride cymbals (track 6)
- Rob Mullarkey – bass (tracks 1, 4, 5)
- Dan Darriba – percussion (tracks 4, 7, 8)
- Rhianna Kenny – backing vocals (all tracks except 6)
- Jodie Scantlebury – backing vocals (all tracks except 6)

=== Technical personnel ===
- Mark Allaway – engineering (at Fish Factory, London)
- Dilip Harris – engineering (at Sofa Sound, London)
- Billy Halliday – engineering assistance (at Sofa Sound, London)
- Darius van Helfteren – mastering (at Amsterdam Mastering, Amsterdam)
- Hans-Jörg Maucksch – vinyl cut (at Pauler Acoustics, Northeim, Germany)
- Eddie Stevens – production

=== Artwork ===
- Farrow – design, art direction
- John Ross – photography

== Charts ==
Chart (2015)	Peak position
Australian Albums (ARIA)	57
Austrian Albums (Ö3 Austria)	29
Belgian Albums (Ultratop Flanders)	12
Belgian Albums (Ultratop Wallonia)	47
Dutch Albums (Album Top 100)	13
German Albums (Offizielle Top 100)	27
Irish Albums (IRMA)	16
Spanish Albums (PROMUSICAE)	68
Swiss Albums (Schweizer Hitparade)	25
UK Albums (OCC)	19
UK Independent Albums (OCC)	2

== Release history ==
Region	Date	Format	Label	Ref.
Australia	8 May 2015	CD; digital download	Play It Again Sam	
Germany	8 May 2015	CD; digital download	Play It Again Sam	
Ireland	8 May 2015	CD; digital download	Play It Again Sam	
United Kingdom	11 May 2015	CD; digital download	Play It Again Sam	
United States	12 May 2015	CD; digital download	Play It Again Sam	
