= Sow into You =

Single by Róisín Murphy

from the album Ruby Blue
- B-side: "Love in the Making"
- Released: 17 October 2005
- Recorded: 2005
- Genre: Electronica; nu jazz; alternative dance; pop
- Length: 3:32 (radio edit); 3:56 (album version)
- Label: Echo
- Songwriters: Matthew Herbert; Róisín Murphy
- Producers: Matthew Herbert; Róisín Murphy

Róisín Murphy singles chronology
"If We're in Love" (2005)	"Sow into You" (2005)	"Overpowered" (2007)

"Sow into You" is an electronica song written and produced by Róisín Murphy and Matthew Herbert for Murphy's debut solo album, Ruby Blue, released in 2005. The song uses a metaphor of rain and harvesting for love and sex. It was released as the album's second single in October 2005.

== Critical reception ==
The song was well received by music critics. Heather Phares of AllMusic wrote that "crisp layers of vocals and brass are all mini-masterpieces of avant electronic pop", and Edward Oculicz of Stylus Magazine called the song's "bounding, organic disco... the nearest thing on offer to a 'The Time Is Now'-esque crossover". In his review for Observer Music Monthly, Garry Mulholland stated that the track contained "all the elements that make great pop music" but noted that "it's unlikely that our 'pop' radio or TV will let you decide for yourself whether [the song] is magic or madness."

== Music video ==
Murphy as an insect in the video.

The music video for the track was shot in London, and directed by Simon Henwood who also directed the video for Murphy's previous single "If We're in Love". In the video, costumes and special effects are used to make Murphy resemble insects and flowers as she dances in front of a white background. The music video also uses the costumes and special effects to represent Murphy transforming into a butterfly.

== Track listings ==
Digital download

1. "Sow into You" (radio edit)
2. "Sow into You" (Bugs in the Attic Remix)
3. "Sow into You" (Bugs in the Attic Dubstrumental)
4. "Love in the Making"

CD single

1. "Sow into You" (radio edit)
2. "Love in the Making"

EP

1. "Sow into You" (radio edit)
2. "Sow into You" (Bugs in the Attic Remix)
3. "Sow into You" (Bugs in the Attic Dubstrumental)
4. "Love in the Making"
