= If We're in Love =

Single by Róisín Murphy

from the album Ruby Blue
- B-side: "Ripples"
- Released: June 2005
- Recorded: 2005
- Genre: Electronic; nu jazz; pop
- Length: 3:39 (Radio edit); 4:31 (Album version)
- Label: Echo
- Songwriters: Matthew Herbert; Róisín Murphy
- Producers: Herbert; Murphy

Róisín Murphy singles chronology
"If We're in Love" (2005)	"Sow into You" (2005)

"If We're in Love" is the debut single by Róisín Murphy, released in June 2005 from her debut solo album, Ruby Blue (2005). It peaked at 18 on the UK Dance Singles and Albums Charts.

== Music video ==
The music video for "If We're in Love" was directed by Simon Henwood. In the video, costumes and special effects are used to resemble a fairytale. The scenery, special effects, and costumes in the music video often remind viewers of Alice in Wonderland.

== Formats and track listings ==
These are the formats and track listings of major single releases of "If We're in Love".

CD single (released 13 June 2005)

1. "If We're in Love" (Radio edit)
2. "Ripples"

EP
(released 13 June 2005)

1. "If We're in Love" (Radio edit)
2. "If We're in Love" (Matthew Herbert's Lovers remix)
3. "Ripples"
4. "If We're in Love" (Dani Siciliano's What Will Be Will Be mix)

Digital download
(released 18 July 2005)

1. "If We're in Love" (Radio edit)
2. "If We're in Love" (Matthew Herbert's Lovers remix)
3. "Ripples"
4. "If We're in Love" (Dani Siciliano's What Will Be Will Be mix)
