= Simon Henwood =

British artist, author, and director

Simon Henwood (born, 31 March 1965, died 21 January 2024) was a British artist, author, film director, and music video director. Henwood first gained attention as a children's writer and later on for his paintings inspired by adolescence, as well as combining "darkness and hip together". He was best known for directing Kanye West's "Love Lockdown" and being the creative force behind Rihanna's Rated R album campaign. Henwood was in a relationship with Irish singer-songwriter Róisín Murphy.

== Career ==
Henwood was born in Portsmouth, England. In 1986, he received his Bachelor of Arts from Exeter College of Art and Design in Devon. Many of Henwood's paintings focus on the experiences and consequences of youth. His work has been showcased by London's Institute of Contemporary Arts and Asprey Jacques, Manhattan's envoy enterprises, New York's Bronwyn Keenan Gallery, and Santa Monica's Richard Heller Gallery.

Henwood authored and illustrated a series of children's books that were published by Farrar, Straus and Giroux in the late 1980s and early 1990s, including A Piece of Luck (1990) and The Troubled Village (1991). In 1993, Henwood developed an "illustrated periodical" named Purr. That same year, Henwood also founded a record label which issued releases by Iggy Pop and Sonic Youth. He produced and directed Alice, a short film scored by Barry Adamson, and created a second magazine of the same name, which "chronicles how childhood is represented in art and the media". In 2001, Henwood created the animated series Johnny Pumpkin, which was in development with Sky One television in the United Kingdom.

Henwood is also known for directing music videos. He has worked with HSI London (previously known as Exposure Films) since 2004. Henwood has worked with a number of artists, such as Apollo 440, Badly Drawn Boy, Delays, Devendra Banhart, and Imogen Heap. He directed Kanye West's "Love Lockdown" in 2008, which was nominated for Video of the Year, Best Male Video, Best Hip-Hop Video, and Best Special Effects in a Video at the 2009 MTV Video Music Awards.

Pop singer Rihanna enlisted Henwood as the creative director for 2009's Rated R. He designed the logo and conceived the brand and styling of the album, videos and TV spots. He also contributed to Rihanna's forthcoming tour, including the show's stage design, costumes and background visuals. Art publisher Rizzoli released a photo book documenting Henwood's work for the pop star in 2010, entitled Rihanna: The Last Girl on Earth.

Henwood also painted the cover of his then-girlfriend Róisín Murphy's album Ruby Blue and its EPs and singles, in addition to directing the music videos for "If We're in Love", "Sow into You" and "Movie Star."

== Bibliography ==
=== Children's books ===
As author

- The Clock Shop (ISBN 978-0-374-31380-7, 1989), published by Farrar, Straus and Giroux
- A Piece of Luck (ISBN 978-0-374-35925-6, 1990), published by Farrar, Straus and Giroux
- The Troubled Village (ISBN 978-0-935008-10-4, 1991), published by Farrar, Straus and Giroux
- The Hidden Jungle (ISBN 978-0-374-33070-5, 1992), published by Farrar, Straus and Giroux

As illustrator

- The King Who Sneezed by Angela McAllister (ISBN 978-0-688-08327-4, 1988), published by William Morrow and Company
- The View by Harry Yoaker (ISBN 978-0-416-16312-4, 1991), published by Methuen

=== Art books ===
- White Kitten (ISBN 978-1-902053-04-2, 2000), published by Arts & Commerce
- Kido (2005), published by Funny Bones Editions
- Rihanna (ISBN 978-0-8478-3510-2, 2010), published by Rizzoli

== Music video filmography ==
2002

- "You Were Right" – Badly Drawn Boy

2003

- "Dude Descending a Staircase" – Apollo 440

2005

- "If We're in Love" – Róisín Murphy
- "Sow into You" – Róisín Murphy
- "Heard Somebody Say" – Devendra Banhart

2006

- "Kelepçe" – Hande Yener
- "Valentine" – Delays
- "Hideaways" – Delays
- "Headlock" – Imogen Heap

2007

- "Song 4 Mutya (Out of Control)" – Groove Armada featuring Mutya Buena

2008

- "Love Lockdown" – Kanye West
