= Róisín Murphy =

Irish singer (born 1973)

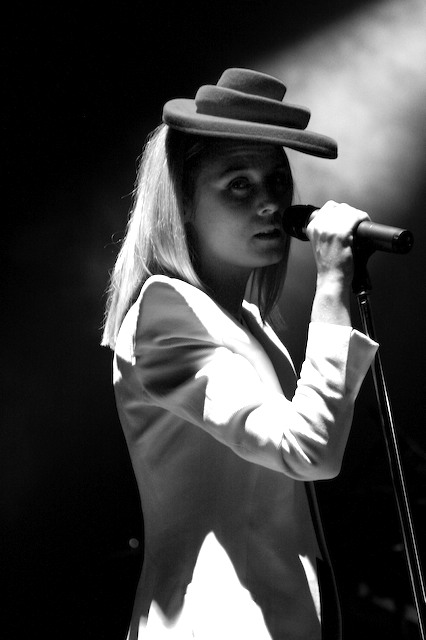
- Murphy performing in Dublin in 2008

Background information
- Born: Róisín Marie Murphy; 5 July 1973 (age 53); Arklow, County Wicklow, Ireland
- Genres: Electropop; dance-pop; art pop; trip hop; nu disco; nu jazz; experimental pop
- Occupations: Singer; songwriter; record producer
- Instruments: Vocals
- Years active: 1994–present
- Labels: Echo; EMI; PIAS; Ninja Tune
- Formerly of: Moloko
- Partner: Sebastiano Properzi

Róisín Marie Murphy (/roʊˈʃiːn/ roh-SHEEN; born 5 July 1973) is an Irish singer, songwriter and record producer who first became known in the 1990s as one half of the pop duo Moloko alongside the English musician Mark Brydon. After the breakup of Moloko, Murphy embarked on a solo career and released her debut solo album Ruby Blue (2005), which she wrote and produced with the experimental musician Matthew Herbert, to critical praise. Her second solo album Overpowered was released in 2007.

In 2015, after an eight-year hiatus that was sporadically interrupted by non-album singles, side projects and guest appearances on other artists' records, Murphy released her third solo album Hairless Toys, which was nominated for the Mercury Music Prize and Ireland's Choice Music Prize. The following year, she released her fourth album Take Her Up to Monto. In 2018, she released four 12-inch singles in collaboration with producer Maurice Fulton. Murphy released her fifth and sixth solo albums Róisín Machine and Hit Parade, which received critical acclaim, in 2020 and 2023, respectively.

== Early life ==
Róisín Marie Murphy was born in Arklow, County Wicklow, in the Republic of Ireland, on 5 July 1973. When she was 12 years old, Murphy and her family moved to Manchester, England. She embraced 1960s fashion, going with her mother, who was an antiques dealer, to car boot sales and charity shops. When she was 15, her parents divorced and her mother moved back to Ireland. Murphy chose to remain in England, not staying with her father but by herself, because she thought her mother did not have the strength to continue taking care of her. She lived with her best friend for a year until she could receive Housing Benefit and move into a nearby flat.

Murphy's school years were difficult; in 2019 she said: "I never felt it was like being bullied; I always felt I intimidated people, and that was why I got in trouble". She befriended a group of "weird boys who wore black" and who listened to The Jesus and Mary Chain. Murphy was inspired to become a performer when she attended a Sonic Youth concert with a friend. She concealed her singing voice, not wanting other people to know she "sounded like Elaine Paige". Murphy later joined a post-punk band that split after a few performances. At the age of 17, Murphy enrolled in a sixth form college and later considered going to art school. At 19, she moved to Sheffield, where she began going to nightclubs and was inspired by the Vivienne Westwood designs she saw at Trash.

== Career ==
=== 1994–2003: Moloko ===
In 1994, Róisín Murphy met Mark Brydon at a party, using the chat-up line: "Do you like my tight sweater? See how it fits my body." Brydon took Murphy to his business Fon Studios, where he auditioned her voice on tape and liked her theatrical delivery. They began dating and formed Moloko, who were signed to Echo Records and released their debut album Do You Like My Tight Sweater? the following year. Heather Phares of AllMusic described the album as combining elements of trip hop and funk with electronic dance music, using a more-humorous approach than some of their contemporaries. The band's follow-up album I Am Not a Doctor covered similar musical ground, and a Boris Dlugosch remix of "Sing It Back" found international success, and was included on more than 110 compilation albums. Instead of paying Dlugosch, Murphy helped write "Never Enough", which reached number sixteen on the UK Singles Chart in June 2001.

Moloko's third album Things to Make and Do was released in October 2000; they used more live instrumentation and arrangements by keyboardist Eddie Stevens. The album reached number three on the UK Albums Chart, and "The Time Is Now" became the band's most-successful British single, reaching number two. Murphy and Brydon broke up but were contractually obligated to deliver further albums. After the 2003 release of Statues, Brydon withdrew from much of the album's promotion so Murphy handled most of it.

No official statement about Moloko's future was issued but Murphy told Q magazine in May 2005:

We left it on good terms after a very successful tour. We shook hands, said "see you later", and haven't spoken since. I don't know what Mark thinks of this record or what he's doing. I don't know if we will or we won't reunite. Myself, I don't not want to.

=== 2004–2005: Ruby Blue ===
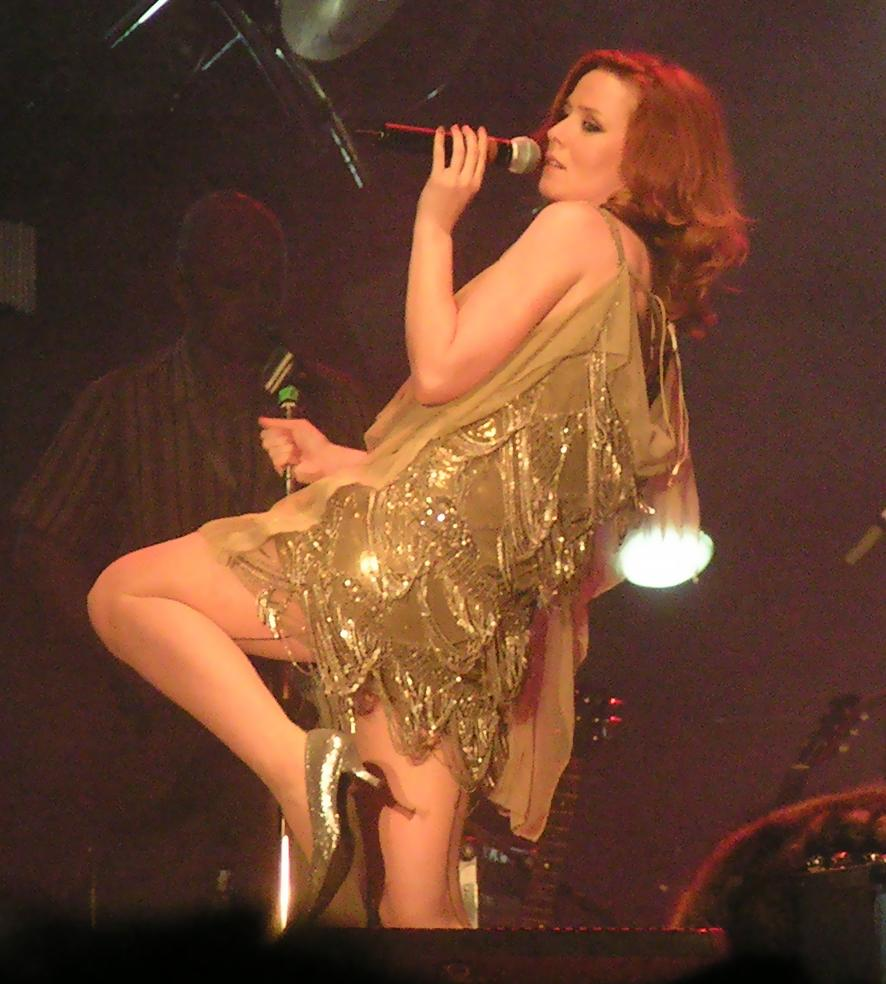
Murphy performing in Haifa in 2005

While still in Moloko, Murphy began doing solo work, which included contributions to the works of other artists, including Handsome Boy Modeling School and the "Never Enough" collaboration with Boris Dlugosch.

In 2004, Murphy recorded her first official solo material with producer Matthew Herbert, who had previously remixed tracks for Moloko. Murphy wanted to work with Herbert again, commenting: "it felt very natural ... because Matthew makes things seem quicker and easier". Murphy and Herbert recorded a few songs and continued working together with support from her label Echo Records. When Murphy presented the label with the album, they found it odd and did not hear any songs that would make successful singles. The A&R division suggested Murphy make some changes to make it more radio-friendly. Murphy refused, stating she "wanted it to be as pure as possible". The label later supported her.

Murphy released her debut solo album Ruby Blue in June 2005. Before the album's release, the tracks Sequins#1, Sequins#2 and Sequins#3 were made available on three limited-edition, vinyl-only releases featuring artwork by Simon Henwood, who also directed two video clips for the album's singles "If We're in Love" and "Sow into You". The album samples sounds made by everyday objects and actions, including cosmetics, brass mice, dancing and ornaments. It mixes the electronic music of Moloko with jazz and pop styles. Although the album was a commercial failure, it drew mainly positive reviews; Pitchfork Media called it "perfect, the ultimate combination of human warmth and technological know-how".

=== 2006–2008: Overpowered ===
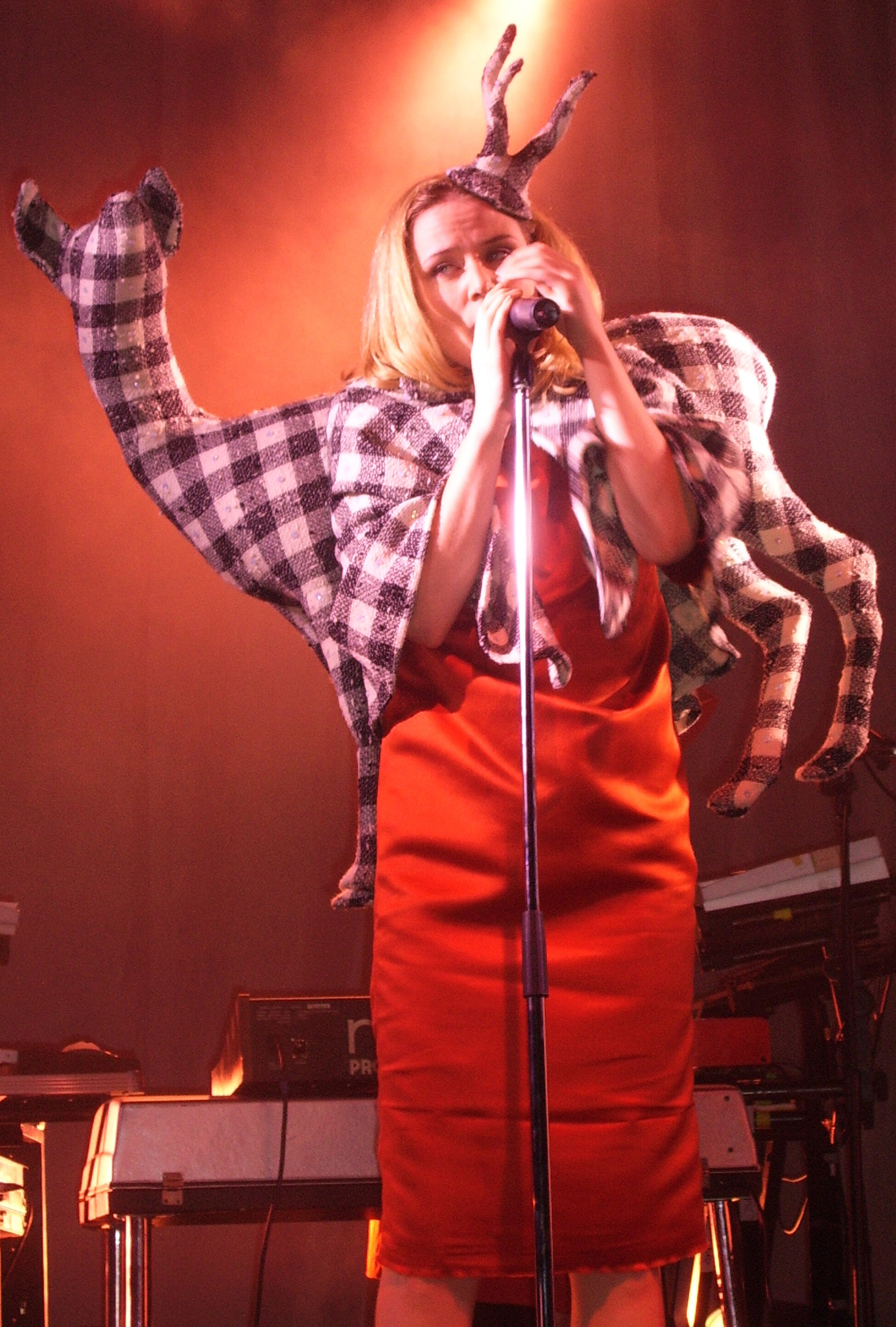
Murphy performing in Sofia in 2008

In May 2006, Murphy signed with EMI Records. "Overpowered", her first single for the label, was released on 2 July 2007. The single was written by Murphy and Paul Dolby (Seiji) of Bugz in the Attic, and mixed by Tom Elmhirst, and was accompanied by a series of remixes from Seamus Haji, Kris Menace, Hervé and Loose Cannons. A second single "Let Me Know", a collaboration with Andy Cato, was released in September and the album, named Overpowered, was released soon after.

In September 2007, Murphy received a pre-nomination for the MTV Europe Music Award for Best Inter Act, but did not make it to the final list. She performed "Let Me Know" on Friday Night with Jonathan Ross on 5 October 2007.

Murphy sustained an eye injury on 27 October 2007, while on tour in Russia to promote Overpowered. She was forced to cancel several subsequent dates on the tour.

=== 2009–2014: Hiatus ===
In mid 2008, Murphy started working with Sejii on a third studio solo album. In the same year, she recorded a cover of Bryan Ferry's song "Slave to Love" that featured in a campaign for Gucci and was released on the promotional single "Movie Star". In 2009, Murphy previewed material at the SeOne club in London, performing "Momma's Place" and "Hold up Your Hands", and in November, she premiered the single "Orally Fixated" on her Myspace page. The song was released later in the month and The Guardian offered a free download of the song for 48 hours.

From 2010 until early 2013, Murphy contributed vocals to Crookers's album Tons of Friends; David Byrne and Fatboy Slim's project Here Lies Love; Mason's '"Boadicea"; Tony Christie's "7 Hills"; The Feeling's "Dance for the Lights"; an anonymous producer's song "Simulation"; "Golden Era" by David Morales; "Flash of Light" and "Invisions" with Luca C & Brigante; "Look Around You" by Boris Dlugosch; "Alternate State" by Hot Natured; Freeform Five's "Leviathan"; and "In My Garden" with Invisible Cities.

The only release under her own name in this period was the single "Simulation", which was released in August 2012 on the label Permanent Vacation.

=== 2014–2017: Mi Senti, Hairless Toys, Take Her Up to Monto ===
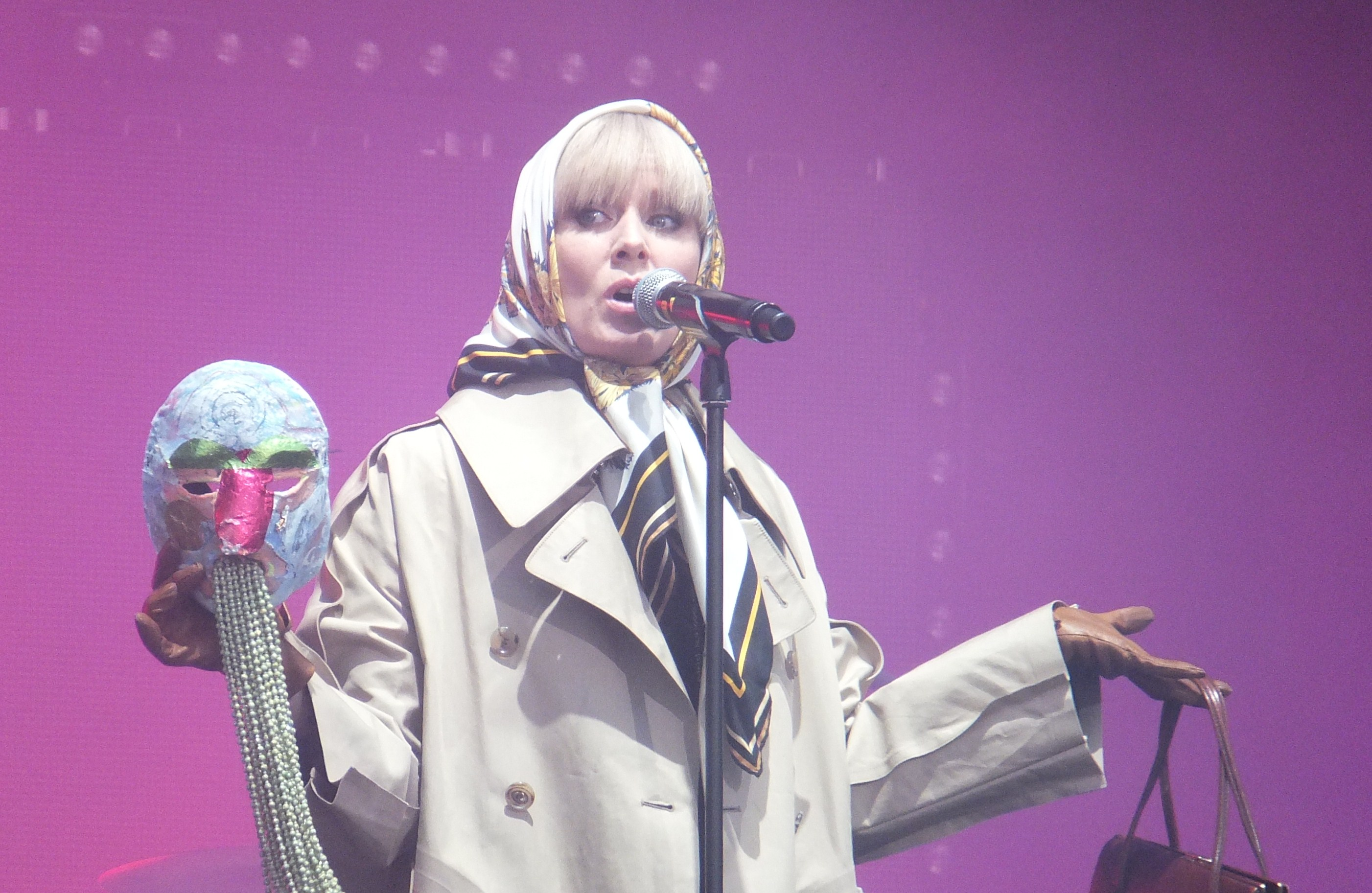
Murphy performing in Helsinki in 2015

In May 2014, Murphy released a six-track Italian language extended play (EP) titled Mi Senti, which includes a new composition and earlier Italian pop hits. Her third studio album Hairless Toys followed a year later and received positive reviews.

There was a desire to make an unquestionably refined record. It's multi layered, electronic and live instrumentation, musically it goes to places most pop music never does. It's emotionally bare and laced with irony. I definitely didn't set out to make something unique per-se but ... it really is like nothing you've ever heard before. So it's impossible to describe except to say ... it's heartfelt.

Her July 2016 album Take Her Up to Monto was recorded during the same sessions as Hairless Toys, and includes contributions from Murphy's long-time collaborator and producer Eddie Stevens. The album's title is derived from an eponymous Irish folk song "Monto (Take Her Up to Monto)", which The Dubliners popularised in the 1960s and Murphy's father sang to her as a child. The release was followed by a number of European festival dates and North American shows.

=== 2018–present: Róisín Machine and Hit Parade ===
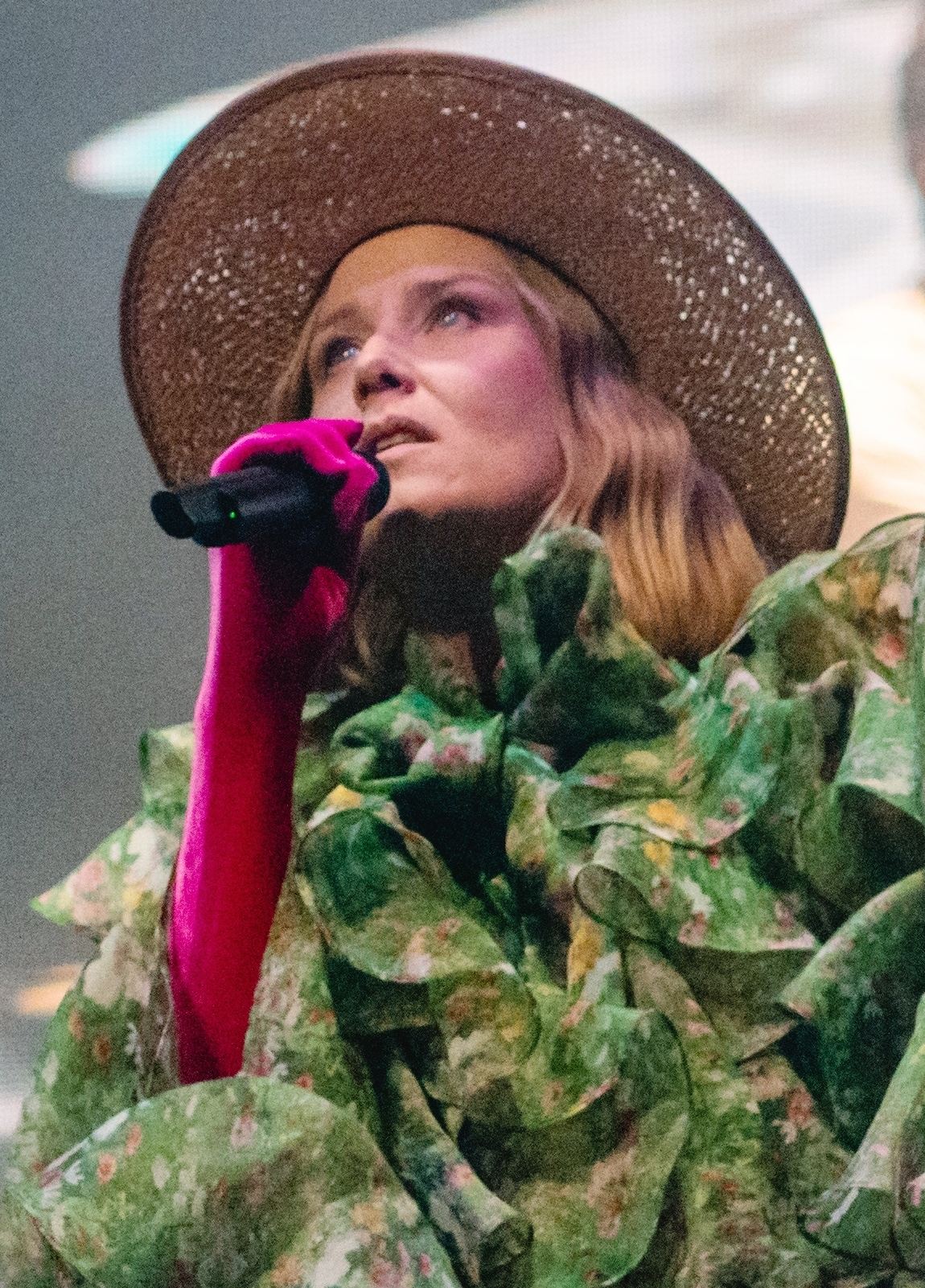
Murphy performing at the BBC6 Roundhouse Festival in 2020

In 2018, The Vinyl Factory released a series of four 12-inch (30 cm) discs that Baltimore house-music pioneer Maurice Fulton produced. Each disc includes two original songs, each of around six minutes, and Murphy directed music videos for the four A-side releases.

The single "Murphy's Law" was released on 4 March 2020. During the COVID-19 pandemic, Murphy gave home performances for a livestream concert that were released as six short films.

Murphy's fifth solo album Róisín Machine was released 2 October 2020. The album has ten tracks, including the singles "Simulation" and "Jealousy" that were released several years prior, and the more-recently produced songs "Incapable", "Narcissus", "Murphy's Law", and "Something More".

Murphy portrayed the blood witch Mercury in the 2022 Netflix series The Bastard Son & The Devil Himself. She also took part in Homobloc's charity T-shirt collection initiative which raised funds for LGBTQ+ focused organisations.

In March 2023, Murphy announced her signing to Ninja Tune with the single "CooCool", which DJ Koze produced. Murphy collaborated with artist Beth Frey and photographer Connor Egan on the single's cover art. On 17 May 2023, Murphy released the single "The Universe" and announced her sixth solo album Hit Parade, which was released on 8 September 2023 to critical acclaim. This was followed in 2024 by the companion Hit Parade Remixed while Murphy continued to tour in support of the release.

== Style ==
Róisín Murphy has drawn considerable attention and praise for her eccentric, imaginative fashion style. Electronic Beats described Murphy as "this adolescent century's true art-pop queen"; and said "her sensuous and ominous output is scattered across various genres and moods" and "her reputation for sporting avant-garde couture into a place among fashion's elite".

AllMusic described Murphy as "a purveyor of adventurous, omnivorous pop that blended influences as far-flung as disco and hot jazz". The Australian publication OutInPerth called her "Ireland's queen of the avant-garde". According to Drowned in Sound's Giuseppe Zevolli, Murphy has "merged pop, house, and disco with an avant-garde sensibility and a stunning, shape-shifting visual output that never ceases to provoke". Critic Mark Fisher, writing in the UK music magazine Fact, located her music in a glam rock lineage that includes Roxy Music, Grace Jones, and the New Romantics, noting Murphy's attention to the cultivation of artifice and persona. Fisher wrote: "Róisín Murphy is pop's exiled princess of glam [rock]. She represents a confection—of disco and art, of sensuousness and intelligence, of sumptuous superficiality and existential anxiety—that once seemed inevitable, but which has now become all but impossible."

The sound of Moloko's early work drew on electronic and trip hop influences before moving to a more organic sound. According to Elizabeth Vincentelli of The New York Times: "it was only after [Moloko's] breakup that Murphy truly refined her trademark fusion of glossy sheen and playful experimentation". Murphy's diverse solo work includes collaborations with experimental jazz composer Matthew Herbert and electronic producer Eddie Stevens, drawing on house music, ballroom culture and avant-garde electronica. Murphy has a contralto vocal range, which has been described as distinctive, smoky and jazzy. Heather Phares said Murphy's voice "combin[es] a wild variety of voices and textures, from impassively chilly to gorgeously lilting to gleefully offbeat". The first performers that left an impression on Murphy were Kim Gordon from Sonic Youth and Kim Deal from Pixies. Iggy Pop also inspired her with his "energy—and he's a giver". Murphy stated her biggest influences were Siouxsie Sioux, Grace Jones and Björk. She was also inspired by Italian female singers such as Mina and Patty Pravo for the way they owned the stage when they moved. Murphy described her performances as "a bit like The Rocky Horror Picture Show"; according to Jad Salfiti of Financial Times, her audiences "dress up to mirror Murphy's own spectacular fashions". Salfiti also said of Murphy: "[her] clothes amplify her personality: exhibitionist, playful, eclectic, larger than life". Fellow artist Jessie Ware has stated: “There is a strength and a command that Róisín generates as a solo artist, particularly as a woman within the dance world. (...) She has been able to create international bangers yet still remains totally original and never follows a trend. She is a pioneer and always has been.”

== Personal life ==
Murphy lives in Ibiza, Spain, having previously split her time between London and Ireland. She previously dated British artist Simon Henwood; they have a daughter together. As of September 2015, Murphy was in a relationship with Italian producer Sebastiano Properzi, with whom she has a son. Murphy is dyslexic.

== Political views ==
=== Views on transgender people ===
In August 2023, Murphy sparked controversy when a X/Twitter user shared a screenshot from Facebook showing Murphy commenting on a post about Irish comedian and anti-transgender activist Graham Linehan, in which she criticised the use of puberty blockers for transgender youth, saying that "Puberty blockers are fucked, absolutely desolate, big pharma laughing all the way to the bank". Her statements were met with backlash on social media, including responses from LGBT+ allies and activists accusing her of transphobia and misinformation. Commentators noted the disappointment of fans, particularly due to her perceived role as a gay icon. In the weeks following the comments, Murphy's material was removed from a scheduled BBC Radio 6 Music line-up, which had been due to broadcast five hours of her songs, interviews, and concert highlights. The BBC later stated that the schedule change was not a reaction to Murphy's comments.

Murphy later issued an apology on social media, stating she was "deeply sorry" for any hurt caused by her words. However, she did not take back her comments on puberty blockers, only writing her "concern was out of love for all of us".

In October 2025, Murphy posted to X/Twitter a graph alleging to show a recent decline in the share of 18- to 22-year-olds who identified as transgender or non-binary. She appended the comment, "It was never real." This drew criticism over her apparent denial of the existence of transgender people. Following the comments, Murphy was removed as a headliner at the 2025 Back In Town Festival in Istanbul.

In June 2026, in response to online backlash, Murphy announced that "trans activists" were no longer welcome at her live events. In August 2026, she criticised Madonna for "supporting the TQ+ bandwagon" and "not calling out its inherent homophobia".

=== Views on cancel culture ===
Murphy has said that she is a victim of cancel culture and has spoken about the "chilling effect" that political correctness and censorship has had on artistic expression.

Following the backlash from her views on trans children, Murphy said that music journalists who had previously told her that Hit Parade was already "album of the year" were now warning her she would receive unfavourable scores if she did not issue an apology. Murphy noted that this "wasn’t just upsetting for me but also very frightening to see how the whole of the music media, in tandem, were able and willing to punish a work of art for the sake of activism". However, she praised The Guardian for continuing to give the album a five-star score. Murphy also said that the record company did not adequately promote Hit Parade due to the ongoing controversy.

On 28 April 2026, Murphy delivered the keynote speech in a House of Lords event for the launch of a report by campaign group Freedom in the Arts. In her speech, Murphy described the backlash to her 2023 comments on puberty blockers for trans youth as "professional exile", alleging that promoters, collaborators and media distanced themselves following the controversy. Murphy suggested that artists are being pressured into self-censorship and that public arts funding favours "ideological conformity". She also described younger critics online as "social media enforcers".

== Discography ==
Solo

- Ruby Blue (2005)
- Overpowered (2007)
- Hairless Toys (2015)
- Take Her Up to Monto (2016)
- Róisín Machine (2020)
- Hit Parade (2023)

With Moloko

- Do You Like My Tight Sweater? (1995)
- I Am Not a Doctor (1998)
- Things to Make and Do (2000)
- Statues (2003)

== Tours ==
- Ruby Blue (2005–2006)
- Overpowered (2007–2008)
- Dj-Set (2009–2014)
- Hairless Toys (2015–2016)
- Take Her Up to Monto (2016–2017)
- Róisín Machine (2021–2022)
- Hit Parade Tour (2023–2024)

== Awards and nominations ==
Award	Year	Nominee(s)	Category	Result	Ref.
AIM Independent Music Awards	2016	Herself	Outstanding Contribution to Music	Won	
ASCAP Pop Music Awards	2000	"Sing It Back"	Club Award	Won	
Antville Music Video Awards	2005	"Sow into You"	Worst Video	Nominated	
Best Art Vinyl	2023	Hit Parade	Best Album Cover Art	Nominated	
Brit Awards	2000	"Sing It Back"	British Single of the Year	Nominated	
Brit Awards	2001	"The Time is Now"	British Single of the Year	Nominated	
Brit Awards	2001	"The Time is Now"	British Video of the Year	Nominated	
Brit Awards	2001	Moloko	British Group	Nominated	
Brit Awards	2001	Moloko	British Dance Act	Nominated	
Choice Music Prize	2007	Overpowered	Album of the Year	Nominated	
Choice Music Prize	2015	Hairless Toys	Album of the Year	Nominated	
Choice Music Prize	2020	Róisín Machine	Album of the Year	Nominated	
DJ Awards	2024	Herself	Best Live Act	Won	
Edison Awards	2004	Statues	Best Dance	Won	
Hungarian Music Awards	2008	Overpowered	Best Foreign Dance Album	Nominated	
International Dance Music Awards	2016	"Evil Eyes"	Best Indie Dance Track	Nominated	
Ivor Novello Awards	1999	"Sing It Back"	The Ivors Dance Award	Nominated	
Ivor Novello Awards	2001	"The Time is Now"	The Ivors Dance Award	Nominated	
Ivor Novello Awards	2004	"Familiar Feeling"	The Ivors Dance Award	Nominated	
MTV Europe Music Awards	2000	Moloko	Best Dance	Nominated	
MVPA Awards	2001	"The Time is Now"	International Video of the Year	Nominated	
Mercury Prize	2015	Hairless Toys	Album of the Year	Nominated	
Meteor Music Awards	2004	Herself	Best Irish Female	Nominated	
Meteor Music Awards	2006	Herself	Best Irish Female	Nominated	
Meteor Music Awards	2008	Herself	Best Irish Female	Nominated	
Meteor Music Awards	2008	Herself	Best Irish Pop Act	Nominated	
Popjustice £20 Music Prize	2007	"Overpowered"	Best British Pop Single	Nominated	
Q Awards	2000	"The Time is Now"	Best Track	Nominated	
Q Awards	2019	"Incapable"	Best Track	Nominated	
Rober Awards Music Prize	2020	Herself	Best Electronic Artist	Nominated	
Rober Awards Music Prize	2020	"Jealousy"	Floorfiller of the Year	Nominated	
TMF Awards	2003	Moloko	Best International Dance	Nominated	
TMF Awards	2003	Moloko	Best International Live	Nominated	
TMF Awards	2003	Statues	Best International Album	Nominated	
UK Music Video Awards	2008	"You Know Me Better"	Best Styling in a Video	Nominated	
UK Music Video Awards	2015	"Evil Eyes"	Best Styling in a Video	Nominated	
Žebřík Music Awards	2003	Moloko	Best International Group	Nominated	
Žebřík Music Awards	2003	Moloko	Best International Surprise	Nominated	
Žebřík Music Awards	2003	Herself	Best International Female	Nominated	
Žebřík Music Awards	2003	Statues	Best International Album	Nominated	
Žebřík Music Awards	2005	Herself	Best International Female	Nominated	
Žebřík Music Awards	2005	Herself	Best International Surprise	Nominated	
Žebřík Music Awards	2007	Overpowered	Best International Album	Nominated	
