= Eddie Stevens =

British keyboardist, record producer, composer and arranger

Eddie Stevens is a British keyboardist, record producer, composer and arranger, best known for co-writing, arranging and touring with the UK groups Freak Power (with Norman Cook aka Fatboy Slim); Moloko (as of 2000); and Zero 7.

He continued to work with the Moloko frontwoman, Róisín Murphy, on her solo projects since 2004. After helping Murphy sequence the songs on Ruby Blue, Stevens became part of her live band throughout the 2005 European 'Ruby Blue' tour. In late 2007 and early 2008 Stevens toured with Murphy on her 'Overpowered' tour throughout Europe.

More recently he worked on the album Some People Have Real Problems with Australian vocalist Sia (which was released in early 2008).

Stevens also forms half of the London-based electronic duo, Post Office; the other half being Daniel Darriba.

In 2014 Stevens embarked on a two album project as producer and co-writer with Róisín Murphy which culminated in the albums Hairless Toys (2015) and Take Her Up to Monto (2016).

Another two album project was the multiple award-winning Moruša: Biela (2013) and Moruša: Čierna (2014) which Stevens produced and co-wrote with his partner Jana Kirschner.

The Post Office album "The Marylebone Greenwave" was released in 2015 by Minority Records.

Stevens has also produced records for Lao Che, Phototaxis, Paristetris, Blubalu, Para, Ofrin and Flip Top Box, among others.

In 2019 produced album Díl první with Czech Republic based folk-rock band Druhá tráva. The album was awarded as the best album in 2020 in Anděl Awards (Czech Grammy Awards). In 2022 Stevens produced another album with Druhá tráva. Díl druhý...

He was also the creator of the band Max Rebo who released the Jazz-Rock fusion album "Living Maxism" in 1996

== Personal life ==
He lives with Slovak singer Jana Kirschner, they met during work on her album Krajina Rovina; they have two daughters; Matilda Janushka Stevens and Yolana Yolanda Stevens.
