= Chillout Sessions =

Compilation album series

Chillout Sessions is a series of compilations released by Ministry of Sound that focus on songs from the chillout genre. Songs on Chillout Sessions compilations vary in style from lounge to electronica and are released by many different artists.

The Chillout genre of compilations started in the UK and since 2003 Ministry of Sound has released them under different tropes such as "Chilled", "After Hours", "The Morning After..." which has shown MOS to have seemingly ended its branding of the genre as Chillout Sessions.

A similar series started in Australia, where the series changed its name from The Chillout Session to The Chillout Sessions and then simply to Chillout Sessions and continued until 2016 with XIX until the record label rebranded to TMRW following the acquisition of MoS by Sony in the UK.

Some Chillout Sessions albums have become known and distinguishable for the symbol of a turntable (with the Ministry of Sound logo on it) frozen in ice, or in one case (The Summer Collection 2003) the turntable itself is made of ice. In the UK this motif is used on the covers of volumes 1, 2, The Winter Collection (2003), The Summer Collection 2003, and The Very Best of album. In Australia, the image is used for volumes 1–6 except on volume 3. The idea of the turntable with the Ministry of Sound logo on had been used on the covers of the Ministry of Sound Clubbers Guide in prior years (and in The Annual IV), the idea of such turntable on the covers was last used on Clubbers Guide albums in early 2001 when The Chillout Session began using the idea.

== History ==
Ministry of Sound, as a label, began in 1993 and its first album was the first volume of a series called Sessions. The series was successful enough for it to generate a spin-off series of The Chillout Session, which began in 2001 with a UK Compilation Chart #1 album. Volume 2 was also very successful. The first and second volumes were released in both the UK and Australia, but the series divided in August 2001, with one series for the UK and the other for Australia.

In the UK, Ibiza Chillout Session was released in August 2001. Although not as successful as the prior releases, it received positive reviews, as did the Ibiza 2002 album. Though the four albums released were part of the Sessions series, the fifth album The Chillout Annual 2002 was part of The Annual series, which was the Ministry of Sound's second series of mix albums, and likewise had Ibiza Annual spin-offs beginning in 1998.

Following the numbered releases (volumes 1 and 2) and both the Ibiza... releases, the albums were themed to seasons, starting with The Winter Collection 2003 (actually released in late 2002, as the sort of style Chillout Annual 2003). The Summer 2003 edition reached #10 in the UK Compilations Chart. A third Ibiza... edition, Ibiza Sunsets, was released shortly afterwards. This series, despite sales success, was suspended in favour of other Ministry of Sound albums in 2003. Its final album The Very Best of the Chillout Sessions was released in late 2003, but did not sell well and until 2011 was the worst-selling album in the series.

Ministry of Sound started the series again in January 2006, with an album titled simply The Chillout Sessions (titled to reflect the fact that it was a reboot for the series). This album had good sales but there were no subsequent releases.

In 2007, Ministry of Sound launched a new series, Anthems, beginning with Anthems 1991–2008. It sold very well and it generated a spin-off album, Chilled 1991–2008. This was followed by a second volume in 2009, a third (suited to acoustic chill-out music) in 2010 and a fourth (Chilled Afterhours, similar to the label's Late Night Sessions albums) in 2011. 2011 was also the year that Ministry of Sound launched its large-scale campaign 20:20, to celebrate 20 years of The Ministry of Sound as a club. One of the associated releases was the box set XX Twenty Years, each disc made up of a different dance genre; the final disc in the box set was Chillout Sessions. Around the same time, Anthems Collection was released, with five discs, each from a different genre, the final one being Anthems Chilled.

Amongst the releases from 2002 to 2004, Ministry of Sound UK also launched spin-off compilations such as Late Night Sessions and Late Night Sessions: Autumn/Winter Collection. With the genre tiring somewhat (the same songs were appearing repeatedly) Ministry of Sound has continued to release Chill Out genre compilations under different guises in the UK. By 2016 these were distinctly split between house-based chillout tracks (Chilled House Sessions 1–7, "Morning After...) to more chart-friendly (compared to the eclectic range of earlier releases) compilations (The Chillout Session (2012), Perfectly Chilled and Just Chillin'). 2016–2017 has notably been a key focus on chillout albums from MoS, much like the early 00s when Dance music had reached its zenith, due to the EDM emergence in America that has moved onto producing slower electronic tracks that combine synths with slower house rhythms or hip-hop beats.

In Australia, the series has been a continued success from Volume 3 in 2002. In a different approach from the UK, the Australian series maintained the numbering system as a suffix in its titles, with only the "Best of..." style album Chillout Classics omitting a number from the title.

In 2016, the Ministry of Sound UK record label was sold to Sony Music. The label is run as an independent and split between A&R and Compilations. The Compilations team were retained when moving to Sony.

Since 2018, Ministry of Sound exclusively moved their Playlists to Apple Music. Many of their well known compilation brands such as Anthems, Fitness, I Love and Chilled have moved to a Playlist format, which accounts for the limited releases of non-streamable Chilled Compilation albums. A notable example is the Chilled House Session series that ran from 2009 to its final release in 2019 (Chilled House Session 9) and is now an exclusive Playlist on Apple Music.

In January 2022, Ministry of Sound released Chillout Sessions (Calm Mixes), an album of three one hour tracks called Ibiza, Energy and Clarity. The album is available to buy from iTunes and streamable (as an album, not a playlist). Each track is a single song and this is not a compilation album.

== List of albums in the Ministry of Sound Chillout Genre ==
=== UK ===
1. The Chillout Session (2001)
2. The Chillout Session 2 (2001)
3. Ibiza Chillout Session (2001)
4. The Chillout Annual 2002 (2001)
5. The Chillout Session: Ibiza 2002 (2002)
6. The Chillout Session 2003: The Winter Collection (2002)
7. The Karma Collection (2002)
8. Late Night Sessions (2003)
9. The Chillout Session: The Summer Collection 2003 (2003)
10. The Chillout Session: Ibiza Sunsets (2003)
11. The Very Best of the Chillout Session (2003)
12. Late Night Sessions Autumn Collection (2003)
13. The Karma Collection Sunrise (2003)
14. The Chillout Session (2006)
15. Chilled 1991–2008 (2008)
16. Chilled II 1991–2009 (2009)
17. The Chilled House Session (2009)
18. Chilled Acoustic (2010)
19. The Winter Sessions (2010)
20. The Chilled House Session 2 (2011)
21. Chilled Afterhours (2011)
22. Chillout Session (CD4 in XX: Twenty Years, 2011)
23. Late Night Sessions (2011)
24. Anthems Chilled (CD5 in Anthems Collection, 2011)
25. The Chilled House Session 3 (2012)
26. Chillout Session (CD4 in XX Volume 2, 2012)
27. The Chillout Session 2012 (2012)
28. The Chilled House Session 4 (2013)
29. Chilled House Classics (2013)
30. Chilled House Ibiza 2013 (2013)
31. The Chilled House Session 5 (2014)
32. Chilled House Ibiza 2014 (2014)
33. The Morning After The Night Before (2014)
34. The Chilled House Session 6 (2015)
35. Chilled House Ibiza 2015 (2015)
36. Chilled (2015)
37. Perfectly Chilled (2015)
38. The Morning After... (2015)
39. The Chilled House Session 7 (2016)
40. Just Chillin' (2016)
41. Chilled Electronic 80s (2016)
42. Chilled House Ibiza 2016 (2016)
43. Recover (2016)
44. Chilled Reggae (2016)
45. Chilled Hip Hop (2016)
46. Chilled House Winter (2016)
47. Chilled House Session 8 (2017)
48. Recover 2017 (2017)
49. Laidback Beats 2017 (2017)
50. Chilled House Ibiza 2017 (2017)
51. Sunset Chilled (2017)
52. Chilled House Session 9 (2018)
53. I Love Acoustic (2018)
54. Chilled 60’s (2018)
55. Throw Back Chillout (2019)

=== Australia ===
1. (The Chillout Session) (2001) Available only in UK import in CD
2. The Chillout Session 2 (2001)
3. The Chillout Annual 2002 (2002)
4. The Chillout Sessions 3 (2002)
5. Chillout Sessions 4 (2003)
6. The Chillout Sessions : Summer Collection 2004
7. Late Night Sessions (2003)
8. Chillout Sessions 5 (2004)
9. Chillout Sessions 6 (2004)
10. Chillout Sessions 7 (2005)
11. Chillout Sessions 8 (2005)
12. Chillout Sessions 9 (2006)
13. Chillout Sessions 10 (2007)
14. Chillout Classics (2007)
15. Chillout Sessions XI (2008)
16. Chillout Sessions XII (2009)
17. Chillout Sessions XIII (2010)
18. Chillout Sessions XIV (2011)
19. Chillout Sessions XV (2012)
20. Chillout Sessions Classics (2013)
21. Chillout Sessions XVI (2013)
22. Chillout Sessions XVII (2014)
23. Chillout Sessions XVIII (2015)
24. Chillout Sessions XIX (2016)
25. Chillout Sessions XX (2018)

=== Other releases ===
1. The Chillout Guide (2001)
2. The Chillout Annual 2002 (2001) – Different track listing to UK album
3. Chilled Sessions (2008) – Download album
4. Anthems Acoustic (2016) – A "chilled" complication but not by name
5. Stripped: Acoustic R&B (2017) – A "chilled" complication but not by name
6. Chillout Sessions (Calm Mixes) (2022) - A three track album of original tracks

== Issues (Australian series) ==
=== The Chillout Session ===
The Chillout Session

Compilation album (mixtape) by Various artists
- Released: 5 February 2001
- Genre: Chillout
- Label: Ministry of Sound

Chillout Sessions chronology
| The Chillout Session (2001) | Chillout Sessions 2 (2001) |

The Chillout Session is the first compilation in the series and was released on 5 February 2001 in the United Kingdom and Australia. Its cover image is used again for The Chillout Guide later in the year. Its cover image was actually first used in 1998 in the booklet of The Annual IV and later as the cover for the Ministry of Sound book The Manual.

The album reached #1 in the UK compilation album chart.

Disc One

1. Badly Drawn Boy – "The Shining"
2. Fatboy Slim feat. Macy Gray – "Demons"
3. Chicane – "No Ordinary Morning"
4. Groove Armada – "Dusk You And Me"
5. Nightmares on Wax – "Les Nuits"
6. Sneaker Pimps – "6 Underground (Nellee Hooper's Edit)"
7. Rob Dougan – "Clubbed To Death"
8. World Party – "Is It Too Late? (Pete Lorimer Remix)"
9. The Beloved – "The Sun Rising (Toms D&B Mix)"
10. LTJ Bukem – "Horizons"
11. Tim 'Love' Lee – "One Night Samba"
12. Thievery Corporation – "So Com Voce"
13. Lemon Jelly – "In The Bath"
14. Kinobe – "Keefe's Quest"
15. Bonobo – "Kota"
16. Moby – "Natural Blues"
17. The Stone Roses – "Shoot You Down (The Soul Hooligan Remix)"
18. Basement Jaxx – "Being With U"

Disc Two

1. Jakatta – "American Dream (Radio Edit) (3:26)
2. York – "The Awakening (Mellow Mix)" (5:15)
3. Sasha & Emerson – "Scorchio (Emerson's Late Night Dub)" (2:34)
4. Medway – "Resurrection" (6:28)
5. Underworld – "Cups (Salt City Orchestra's Vertical Bacon Vocal)" (7:36)
6. Etienne De Crecy – "Prix Choc (Alex Gopher's Free Tax Mix)" (3:56)
7. Afro Medusa – "Pasilda (Afterlife Mix)" (4:07)
8. Wamdue Project – "King of My Castle (Original Radio Edit)" (3:32)
9. Alex Gopher – "The Child" (4:18)
10. Bent – "Swollen (Beloved Café Del Marsh Mix) (4:24)
11. Sumsonic Presents... – "Falling" (6:09)
12. Amber – "Sexual (Afterlife Mix)" (4:26)
13. Bedrock – "Beautiful Strange (Acoustic Mix)" (4:01)
14. Leftfield – "Melt" (3:52)
15. Orion – "Eternity (Acoustic Mix)" (4:20)
16. Watergate – "Merry Christmas Mr. Lawrence (Heart of Asia) (Astro Heavenly Mix)" (3:35)
17. Energy 52 – "Café Del Mar (Michael Woods Remix)" (3:47)
18. William Orbit – "Barber's Adagio For Strings" (1:47)

=== The Chillout Session 2 ===
The Chillout Session 2

Compilation album (mixtape)
- Released: 3 July 2001
- Genre: Chillout
- Label: Ministry of Sound

Chillout Sessions chronology
| The Chillout Session (2001) | The Chillout Session 2 (2001) | The Chillout Sessions 3 (2002) |

The Chillout Session 2 is the second installment in the series and was released on 3 July 2001 in the United Kingdom and Australia. It reached #2 in the UK compilation album chart.

Disc One

1. Dido – "Here With Me" (4:13)
2. The Avalanches – "Since I Left You" (3:58)
3. I Monster – "Daydream in Blue" (3:19)
4. Groove Armada – "At The River" (4:14)
5. Massive Attack – "Weather Storm" (4:54)
6. Chicane – "Offshore" (4:47)
7. Jakatta – "American Dream" (4:13)
8. Zero 7 – "Give It Away" (5:06)
9. Smoke City – "Underwater Love" (3:47)
10. Kinobe – "Slip into Something More Comfortable" (4:30)
11. Rae & Christian featuring Veba – "Spellbound (3:43)
12. Pepe Deluxé – "Before You Leave" (3:49)
13. Bentley Rhythm Ace – "Bentley's Gonna Sort You Out" (3:32)
14. Hairy Diamond – "Givin Up" (2:42)
15. Skinny – "Worth It" (3:21)
16. Lemon Jelly – "Come" (3:57)
17. Mr. Natural – "Playing To Win" (3:57)
18. Bent – "Private Road" (4:10
19. Radiohead – "Street Spirit (Fade Out)" (4:12)

Disc Two

1. Everything But The Girl Vs. Soul Vision – "Tracey in My Room (Original Mix)" (4:11)
2. Dubtribe Sound System – "Do It Now (Original Mix)" (3:48)
3. Underworld – "Jumbo (Future Shock World's Apart Vox)" (5:50)
4. Banda Sonora & G Club – "Guitarra G [Original Chill Out Mix]" (4:34)
5. Faithless – "Drifting Away (Album Mix)" (2:44)
6. Breezin' – "Clouds" (4:20)
7. Deadly Avenger – "Day One" (4:26)
8. Roger Sanchez – "Another Chance (Afterlife Mix)" (5:14)
9. Full Intention & Shena – "I'll Be Waiting (Lux Remix)" (3:39)
10. Ruff Driverz – "Savannah" (4:40)
11. Santos – "Hear My Soul" (2:48)
12. Kristine Blond – "Love Shy (Sandgate Remix)" (4:21)
13. Pilgrims of The Mind – "Nothing Can Pull Us Apart (Full Length) (4:14)
14. Delerium – "Silence" (3:48)
15. BT – "Shame (Bent Instrumental" (3:34)
16. Origin – "Refined Intricacy (Full Vox)" (3:39)
17. Schiller – "Das Glockenspiel (Schill Out Mix)" (5:35)
18. The Aloof – "One Night Stand (7" Edit)" (4:34)

=== The Chillout Sessions 3 ===
Chillout Sessions 3

Compilation album (mixtape)
- Released: 30 September 2002
- Genre: Chillout
- Label: Ministry of Sound

Chillout Sessions chronology
| The Chillout Session 2 (2001) | Chillout Sessions 3 (2002) | Chillout Sessions 4 (2003) |

The Chillout Sessions 3 is the third installment in the series and was released on 30 September 2002. It was the first album to be released in Australia only, and the first to use the name 'Sessions' in the title instead of simply 'Session'

The front cover uses the same image that the UK release The Chillout Session: Ibiza 2002 does.

Disc One

1. 1 Giant Leap – "My Culture"
2. Groove Armada – "My Friend"
3. Air – "All I Need"
4. Basement Jaxx – "Romeo (Acoustic Mix)"
5. Lamb – "What Sound"
6. Roger Sanchez – "Another Chance (Acoustic Version)"
7. Kinobe – "Summer in the Studio"
8. Moby – "We Are All Made of Stars (Downtempo)"
9. Nitin Sawhney – "Sunset"
10. Timo Maas – "Hash Drivien"
11. Fatboy Slim – "The Weekend Starts Here"
12. Sia – "Drink to Get Drunk"
13. Gt – "You Are Here"
14. Etienne De Crecy – "Tempovision"
15. Charles Webster – "Ready"
16. Jazzanova – "Bohemian Sunset"
17. Felix Da Housecat – "Runaway Dreamer"
18. Paul Mac feat. Abby Dobson – "Gonna Miss You (Kinobe Remix)"
19. Nuyorican Soul – "I Am The Black Gold of the Sun (4 Hero Remix)"
20. Kosheen – "Hide You (Acoustic Mix)"
21. Zero 7 – "Destiny"

Disc Two

1. X-Press 2 feat. David Byrne – "Lazy"
2. Matt Darey & Marcella Woods – "Beautiful (Stuart Crichton Radio Mix)"
3. Blue Six – "Music & Wine (Th'attaboy Vocal)"
4. Mambana – "No Reason (DJ Meri Vox Mix)"
5. Jakatta – "So Lonely (Photek Mix)"
6. DB Boulevard – "Point of View (Original Club Mix)"
7. Kings of Tomorrow – "Young Hearts (San's Vibe Mix)"
8. Freddy & Herman – "Aquarius"
9. Hi Fi Mike – "Stereo Flavas – (Lum's Original Flava Remix)"
10. Shakedown – "At Night (Afterlife Mix)"
11. Ad Finem – "If You Fall (Jask's Fall From Heaven Mix)"
12. Layo & Bushwacka! – "Love Story"
13. D*note – "Shed My Skin (Pete Heller's Stylus Mix)"
14. Jam & Spoon – "Stella"
15. Saint Etienne – "Action"
16. Beth Orton – "Central Reservation (Spiritual Life Ibadan Edit)"

=== Chillout Sessions 4 ===
Chillout Sessions 4

Compilation album (mixtape)
- Released: 27 May 2003
- Genre: Chillout
- Label: Ministry of Sound

Chillout Sessions chronology
| The Chillout Sessions 3 (2002) | Chillout Sessions 4 (2003) | Chillout Sessions 5 (2004) |

Chillout Sessions 4 is the fourth installment in the series. It was the first to remove "The" from the title, leaving the series title simply 'Chillout Sessions'.

The front cover uses the same image that the UK release The Chillout Session 2003: Winter Collection does.

Disc One

1. Jakatta feat. Seal – "My Vision (Summer in White Edit)"
2. Morcheeba – "Otherwise"
3. Massive Attack – "Special Cases"
4. Air – "Playground Love"
5. Moby – "In This World"
6. Röyksopp – "Eple (Fatboy Slim Remix)"
7. Ralph Myerz and the Jack Herren Band – "Nikita"
8. Faithless – "Crazy English Summer"
9. Rob Dougan – "Clubbed To Death (Kurayamino Variation)"
10. Björk – "It's in Our Hands"
11. Lamb – "Gabriel"
12. David Bridie – "Hotel Radio"
13. Futureshock feat. Ben Onono – "On My Mind (Electric Lounge Session)"
14. Charles Webster feat. Del St. Joseph – "Sweet Butterfly"
15. SW – "Sweet Lullabies"
16. Floris – "One More Day"
17. St. Germain – "Sure Thing"
18. Underworld – "Sola Sistim"
19. Armin Van Buuren feat. Ray Wilson – "Yet Another Day (Armin's Downtempo Interpretation Edit)"

Disc Two

1. Room 5 feat. Oliver Cheatham – "Make Luv (Extended Mix)"
2. Moloko – "Familiar Feeling (Martin Buttrich remix)"
3. Bent – "Magic Love (Ashley Beedle's Black Magic Vocal Mix)"
4. Jamiroquai – "Corner of the Earth (Milk & Sugar Club Mix)"
5. Sade – "By Your Side (Ben Watt Lazy Dog Mix)"
6. Kaskade – "It's You, It's Me"
7. Sandy Rivera feat. Haze – "Changes (Ben Watt Lazy Dog Remix)"
8. Jakatta – "One Fine Day (Cicada Remix)"
9. Groove Armada – "Healing"
10. Gabin – "Doo Uap, Doo Uap, Doo Uap"
11. Hi Fi Serious – "Because"
12. Stylophonic – "If Everybody in the World Loved Everybody in the World"
13. DJ Cam – "Une Ete A Paris (Summer in Paris)"
14. In-Grid – "You Promised Me (Tu Es Foutu) (Original Extended Version)"
15. Weekend Players – "21st Century"
16. Krystal K – "Let's Get It Right (Firty Trikz Fake Remix)"
17. Manijama feat. Mukupa & L'il T – "No, No, No (Jask Thaisoul Mix)"
18. De Nuit – "All That Mattered (Love You Down) (Coloursound Vlub Mix)"
19. 2 Heads – "Out of the City (Hardkandy Mix)"
20. iiO – "At The End (Sat + Howler Remix)"

=== Chillout Sessions 5 ===
Chillout Sessions 5

Compilation album (mixtape)
- Released: 2004
- Genre: Chillout
- Label: Ministry of Sound

Chillout Sessions chronology
| Chillout Sessions 4 (2003) | Chillout Sessions 5 (2004) | Chillout Sessions 6 (2004) |

Fifth in the series, Chillout Sessions 5 is a two-disc compilation of songs by various artists that was released in 2004. Its front cover uses the same image that the UK release The Very Best of the Chillout Session does. The image is also similar to that used on the front cover of Chillout Classics.

Disc One

1. Zero 7 – "Home"
2. Sia – "Breathe Me (Four Tet Remix)"
3. Lamb – "Wonder"
4. Coldplay – "The Scientist"
5. Jack Johnson – "Taylor"
6. Joss Stone – "Fell in Love with a Boy"
7. Vassy – "Cover You in Kisses (Golden Katalyst Remix)"
8. Nitin Sawhney – "Rainfall"
9. Jamiroquai – "Corner of the Earth"
10. 11cc – "I'm Not in Love"
11. Car Stereo Wars – "Come To Nothing"
12. Water – "No Goodbye"
13. Mylo – "Valley of the Dolls"
14. Plump DJs feat. Louise Rhodes – "Morning Sun"
15. Ikon – "Calling You"
16. Paul Jackson feat. Steve Smith – "The Push (Far From Here)"
17. Motorcycle – "As The Rush Comes (Gabriel & Dresden Chillout Mix)"
18. The Chemical Brothers feat. The Flaming Lips – "The Golden Path"
19. Bang Bang – "Don't Care"
20. Turin Brakes – "Feeling Oblivion"

Disc Two

1. DJ Sneak – "Summer Song"
2. Doctor Rockit – "Café De Flore (Charles Webster's Latin Lovers Mix)"
3. Isolée – "Beau Mot Plage (Freeform Reform Parts I & II)"
4. Malou – "I Wish (Trentemøller Late Night Mix)"
5. DJ T- "Philly"
6. Dino – "Dance Like The Old Days"
7. Röyksopp – "Remind Me"
8. Moloko – "Cannot Contain This"
9. Starsailor – "Four to the Floor (Thin White Duke Mix)"
10. Cut Copy – "Future"
11. Deepest Blue – "Give It Away"
12. Groove Armada – "But I Feel Good"
13. Crazy Penis – "You Started Something"
14. Soundz Fresh – "Human Nature (Club Vox Break Mix)"
15. Taurine – "Growing on Me"
16. Martin Solveig – "Someday"
17. Lisa Shaw – "Always"
18. Mood II Swing – "Can't Get Away (Shine Vocal Mix)"
19. A Hundred Birds – "Jaguar"
20. God Within – "Raincry (Vance Musgrove Remix)"

=== Chillout Sessions 6 ===
Chillout Sessions 6

Compilation album (mixtape)
- Released: 2004
- Genre: Chillout
- Label: Ministry of Sound

Chillout Sessions chronology
| Chillout Sessions 5 (2004) | Chillout Sessions 6 (2004) | Chillout Sessions 7 (2005) |

Chillout Sessions 6 is a two-disc compilation of songs by various artists that was released in December 2004. The red B&B Italia UP series "Big Momma" chair & footstool featured on the album cover was courtesy of the Space Furniture site.

Disc One

1. Missy Higgins – "Nightminds (Dave Higgins Remix)"
2. Zero 7 – "Somersault"
3. Shapeshifters – "Lola's Theme (Lola's Lounging Mix)"
4. Bent – "Sunday 29th"
5. Ben Harper & The Blind Boys of Alabama – "There Will Be A Light"
6. Mark Farina – "Dream Machine"
7. The 411 – "On My Knees"
8. Kaskade – "Steppin' Out (Late Night Alumni Slow Dance Remix)"
9. Taurine – "Dreams of Hope"
10. Dynamoe – "In Your Own Time"
11. Hi Fi Mike – "I'll Carry You"
12. Sia – "Don't Bring Me Down"
13. The Dissociatives – "Forever and a Day"
14. Jet – "Look What You've Done"
15. Gomez – "Sweet Virginia"
16. Coldplay – "Don't Panic"
17. Dave Seaman pres. Group Therapy feat. Nat Leonard – "My Own Worst Enemy (Spector Mix)"
18. Mylo – "Need You Tonight"
19. Cut Copy – "Saturdays"
20. Max Sedgley – "Happy"

Disc Two

1. Hardsoul feat. Ron Carroll – "Back Together (Copyright Reprise Mix)"
2. Soldiers of Twilight – "Believe (Martin Solveig Vocal Dub)"
3. Cajmere feat. Walter Phillips – "Midnight (MG's Funk'd Vocal Mix)"
4. Martin Solveig – "I'm A Good Man"
5. Fred Everything feat. Karl The Voice – "For Your Pleasure"
6. Low – "Tonight (Ben Watt Night Flight Remix)"
7. Ben Watt – "Lone Cat (Holding On)"
8. Sandy Rivera – "Dreams (Rasmus Faber Remix)"
9. DJ Gregory – "The Joburg Theme"
10. Justin Martin – "The Sad Piano (Charles Webster Remix)"
11. Toby Neal – "Feelin' Alright"
12. Shakedown – "Love Game (Original Shakedown Mix)"
13. Mr. Scruff – "Get A Move On"
14. Sweet Coffee – "Don't Need You (Den Hetrix & Cash'mir House Mix)"
15. J:Sonic feat. Jon Fitz & Abigail Bailey – "Release The Pressure (Instrumental)"
16. Dino – "Call Me (In A Club Mix)"
17. Phoenix – "If I Ever Feel Better"
18. Télépopmusik – "Breathe"
19. Soul Central – "Strings of Life (The Funky Lowlives Remix)"

=== Chillout Sessions 7 ===
Chillout Sessions 7

Compilation album (mixtape)
- Released: 2005
- Genre: Chillout
- Label: Ministry of Sound

Chillout Sessions chronology
| Chillout Sessions 6 (2004) | Chillout Sessions 7 (2005) | Chillout Sessions 8 (2005) |

Chillout Sessions 7 is the seventh installment of the Chillout Sessions series of compilations, released by Ministry of Sound.

Disc One

1. Télépopmusik featuring Angela McClusky – "Don't Look Back"
2. Freeform Five – "Easy"
3. Bang Gang – "Inside"
4. Infusion – "Invisible"
5. Snow Patrol – "Run (Jacknife Lee Remix)"
6. Athlete – "Wires"
7. Lior – "This Old Love"
8. Phoenix – "Love for Granted"
9. Hardkandy – "Big Sand"
10. Hi Fi Mike – "Secretly Watching Me"
11. A Man Called Adam – "Estelle"
12. Vassy – "Loverman"
13. Mylo – "Sunworshipper"
14. Husky Rescue – "Summertime Cowboy"
15. Fatboy Slim – "The Joker"
16. Flevans – "Lay It Down"
17. Just Jack – "Snowflakes (Cured by Temple of Jey)"
18. Rune featuring Morten Luco – "Nothing New (Mosquito Remix)"
19. Milosh – "You Make Me Feel"
20. Air – "Alone in Kyoto"

Disc Two

1. Spektrum – "Kinda New"
2. Phonique featuring Erlend Oye – "For The Time Being"
3. Rachael Starr – "Till There Was You (John Creamer & Stephane K Radio Mix)"
4. Alexkid with Lissette Alea – "Don't Hide It"
5. ArtOfDisco by Vince – "Superworld"
6. Turntablerocker – "TT.roy (Dub)"
7. Andre Krami featuring Schad Privat – "Safari"
8. Juliet – Avalon
9. Evil Nine – "Hired Goons"
10. Bang Bang – "Silicone (The Mighty Bop vs Blackjoy Dub)"
11. Bent – "Comin' Back"
12. Unity – "I Love You (Manoo and François A Remix)"
13. Lisa Shaw – "Let It Ride (Jimpster Remix)"
14. Greens Keepers featuring Colette – "Keep It Down"
15. Lemon Jelly – "Stay With You"
16. Black Grass – "Aporia"
17. Lazyboy – "Police, Dogs, Bonfire (Linus Loves Remix)"
18. Mocky featuring Jamie Lidell – "How Will I Know You"
19. Cagedbaby – "Hello There"
20. Candi Staton – "You Got The Love (New Voyager Remix)"

=== Chillout Sessions 8 ===
Chillout Sessions 8

Compilation album (mixtape)
- Released: 11 October 2005
- Genre: Chillout
- Length: Disc 1: 79:42; Disc 2: 79:31
- Label: Ministry of Sound

Chillout Sessions chronology
| Chillout Sessions 7 (2005) | Chillout Sessions 8 (2005) | Chillout Sessions 9 (2006) |

Chillout Sessions 8 is the eighth installment in the Chillout Sessions series, released by Ministry of Sound.

Disc One

1. Emilíana Torrini – "Sunny Road"
2. Lior – "Daniel"
3. Breaks Co-Op – "The Otherside"
4. Alexkid – "Turn It Round Again"
5. Boozoo Bajou feat. Wayne Martin – "Moanin'"
6. Radiohead – "Climbing Up The Walls (Zero 7 Mix)"
7. Husky Rescue – "New Light of Tomorrow (Bonobo Remix)"
8. Kraak & Smaak – "Danse Macabre"
9. Datarock – "The Most Beautiful Girl"
10. Steve Mac vs. Mosquito feat. Steve Smith – "Lovin' You More (That Big Track) (Mosquito Chillout Mix)"
11. Alpinestars – "Burning Up"
12. Tosca – "Rondo Acapricio"
13. Manhead – "Doop"
14. Stereo MCs – "First Love"
15. Dr. Rubberfunk – "Latin Player"
16. Plantlife – "When She Smiles She Lights The Sky (4Hero Mix)"
17. Lemon Jelly – "'95 Aka Make Things Right"
18. Paul Mac feat. Peta Morris – "Sunshine Eyes"
19. Ian Brown – "Time Is My Everything (Album Version)"

Disc Two

1. Scissor Sisters – "Comfortably Numb"
2. Hot Toddy – "Mindtrip"
3. Rithma feat. Ryralio Djs – "The Funk Is Still Alive (Ryralio Djs Mix)"
4. Recloose feat. Joe Dukie – "Dust"
5. Kings of Tomorrow – "Another Day"
6. Schmoov! – "Spirits (Lights Out Mix)"
7. Rise Ashen – "Second Wind"
8. Fred Everything – "Light of Day"
9. Blaze presents UDA feat. Barbara Tucker – "Most Precious Love (Franck Roger Remix)"
10. Bah Samba feat. Isabel Fructuoso – "Calma (Louie Vega Remix)"
11. Chuck Love – "El Divorcee"
12. Jamiroquai – "Seven Days in Sunny June (Steve Mac Classic Mix)"
13. Copyright Present One Track Mind – "Essence of Life (Main Mix)"
14. Julien Jabre – "Swimming Places"
15. Mark Farina – "Cali Spaces (Kaskade Mix)"
16. Grooveyard – "7 Mile"
17. Moreno – "Firebird (Ocean Beach Mix)"
18. Axwell feat. Steve Edwards – "Watch The Sunrise (Original Ha Ha Ha Mix)"
19. Bob Sinclar – "Love Generation (Club Mix)"

=== Chillout Sessions 9 ===
Chillout Sessions 9

Compilation album (mixtape)
- Released: 14 October 2006
- Genre: Chillout
- Length: Disc 1: 79:46; Disc 2: 79:15
- Label: Ministry of Sound

Chillout Sessions chronology
| Chillout Sessions 8 (2005) | Chillout Sessions 9 (2006) | Chillout Sessions 10 (2007) |

Chillout Sessions 9 is the ninth installment in the Chillout Sessions series, released by Ministry of Sound.

Disc One

1. José González – "Heartbeats"
2. Angus and Julia Stone – "Paper Aeroplane"
3. Max Sedgley – "Slowly"
4. Gotye – "Hearts A Mess"
5. Gomez – "Notice"
6. Thom Yorke – "Black Swan"
7. Telemetry Orchestra – "Shine"
8. Sébastien Tellier – "La Ritournelle"
9. Camille – "Ta Douleur"
10. Ben Westbeech – "So Good Today"
11. Peter Bjorn and John- "Young Folks"
12. Jenny Wilson – "Let My Shoes Lead Me Forward"
13. Annie – "Heartbeat"
14. Lily Allen – "Smile"
15. Kisschasy – "The Shake"
16. The Sleepy Jackson – "God Lead Your Soul"
17. Nouvelle Vague – "Blue Monday"
18. Chicken Lips – "Sweet Cow"
19. Gaelle – "Give It Back"
20. The Knife – "Marble House"

Disc Two

1. Djuma Soundsystem – "Les Djinns (Trentemoller Remix)"
2. Mile Caro & Franck Garcia – "Far Away"
3. Hot Chip – "Colours (Remixed by Fred Falke)"
4. Toby Neal – "My Love (Putsch '79 Disco Mix)"
5. Hot Toddy – "Slave To You"
6. Kaskade – "In This Life"
7. Latrice – "Love Is"
8. Ron Hall & The Mothafunkaz feat. Marc Evans – "The Way You Love Me (Dim's T.S.O.P Version)"
9. Soul Central feat. Billie – "In-Ten-City (Vocal Mix)"
10. Liquid People – "Son of Dragon"
11. Roberto De Carlo feat. Joshua – "Magic Star"
12. Soul Creation – "Nia's Journey Back"
13. And If – "Finest Dream (Original Instrumental Mix)"
14. Dab Hands – "DYOT"
15. Tennishiro feat. Chelonis R. Jones – "Alone (Original Vocal Version)"
16. Milke – "She Says (Wahoo Remix)"
17. Mattafix – "To and Fro (Chicken Lips Remix)"
18. WhoMadeWho – "Space For Rent"

=== Chillout Sessions 10 ===
Chillout Sessions 10

Compilation album (mixtape)
- Released: 13 October 2007
- Genre: Chillout
- Length: Disc 1: 78:30; Disc 2: 79:42
- Label: Ministry of Sound

Chillout Sessions chronology
| Chillout Sessions 9 (2006) | Chillout Sessions 10 (2007) | Chillout Sessions XI (2008) |

Chillout Sessions 10 is the tenth installment of the Chillout Sessions series of compilations, released by Ministry of Sound.

Disc One

1. Sébastien Tellier – "La Ballade du Georges"
2. Husky Rescue – "Diamonds in the Sky"
3. Caribou – "Hello Hammerheads"
4. José González – "Down The Line"
5. Angus and Julia Stone – "The Beast"
6. Salmonella Dub – "Love Sunshine And Happiness"
7. Mattafix – "Living Darfur"
8. The Beauty Room – "Holding On"
9. The Bird and the Bee – "Again & Again"
10. Sia – "Pictures"
11. Amy Winehouse – "Back to Black"
12. OutKast – "Idlewild Blue (Don'tchu Worry 'Bout Me)"
13. Emilie Simon – "Fleur De Saison"
14. Au Revoir Simone – "Sad Song"
15. Misha – "Losing"
16. Amp Fiddler feat. Corinne Bailey Rae – "If I Don't (Foreign Beggars Remix)"
17. Robert Gomez – "All We Got"
18. Grizzly Bear – "Knife"
19. Menomena – "Wet And Rusting"
20. Blonde Redhead – "Silently"

Disc Two

1. 1gnition – "Secret Sunday Lover (Original 12" Instrumental)"
2. Tracey Thorn – "It's All True (Escort Extended Remix)"
3. Just Fascination – "The Rain (Original Mix)"
4. Osunlade – "April (Extended Mix)"
5. Mood II Swing feat. Tara J – "Passing Time (Main Vocal Mix)"
6. Office Gossip – "Say It"
7. Mark Grant feat. Russoul – "Guessin Again (Soul Bounce Remix Vocal)"
8. Troydon – "I'm With Ya (Joshua Heath's Play That Bass Mix)"
9. Carl Kennedy vs M.Y.N.C. Project feat. Roachford – "Ride The Storm (Carl Kennedy Remix)"
10. Chris Lake feat. Emma Hewitt – "Carry Me Away (Original Club Mix)"
11. Soul Central feat. Abigail Bailey – "Time After Time (Original)"
12. Trentemøller feat. Ane Trolle – "Moan (Trentemøller Vocal Version)"
13. Ida Engberg – "Disco Volante (Sébastien Léger Remix)"
14. Dusty Kid – "Cowboys"
15. Booka Shade – "Karma Car"
16. Junior Boys – "The Equalizer"
17. Hot Chip – "My Piano"
18. Midnight Juggernauts – "Into The Galaxy"

=== Chillout Classics ===
==== Disc 1 ====
1. Jakatta – "American Dream (Afterlife Remix)"
2. Tall Paul vs INXS – "Precious Heart (Lush Remix)"
3. Hybrid – "Finished Symphony (Hybrid Soundtrack Edit Mix)"
4. Coldcut – "Autumn Leaves (Irresistible Force Remix Trip 2)"
5. Goldfrapp – "Black Cherry"
6. Michael Andrews feat. Gary Jules – "Mad World"
7. Lamb – "Gorecki"
8. The Sabres of Paradise – "Smokebelch II (Beatless Mix)"
9. Sub Sub – "Past"
10. Three Drives – "Greece 2000 (Moonwatcher Mix)"
11. Air – "La Femme D'argent"
12. Zero 7 – "Destiny"
13. Groove Armada – "My Friend"
14. Jamiroquai – "Corner of the Earth"
15. Röyksopp – "Remind Me"
16. Alpinestars – "Burning Up"
17. Coldplay – "The Scientist"
18. Radiohead – "Street Spirit (Fade Out)"

==== Disc 2 ====
1. Nitin Sawhney – "Sunset (Prophesy Album Version)"
2. Massive Attack – "Karmacoma"
3. Bomb the Bass feat. Justin Warfield – "Bug Powder Dust (Kruder & Dorfmeister Session Remix)"
4. Leftfield – "Original"
5. Smoke City – "Underwater Love"
6. Robert Dougan – "Clubbed to Death (Kurayamino Variation)"
7. Charles Webster – "Ready"
8. Morcheeba – "The Sea"
9. Sofa Surfers – "Sofa Rockers (Richard Dorfmeister Remix)"
10. Nightmares on Wax – "Les Nuits"
11. Saint Etienne – "Only Love Can Break Your Heart (Weatherall Mix)"
12. Moby – "Why Does My Heart Feel So Bad?"
13. Depeche Mode – "Useless (The Kruder + Dorfmeister Session)"
14. Mark Farina feat. Sean Hayes – "Dream Machine"
15. Crazy Penis – "Beautiful People"
16. Sia – "Breathe Me (Mylo Remix)"
17. Nuyorican Soul – "I am the Black Gold of the Sun (4 Hero Remix Edit)"

==== Disc 3 ====
1. Ian Pooley – "Whats Your Number (Jazzanova Renumber)"
2. Soldiers of Twilight – "Believe (Martin Solveig Vocal Club)"
3. Gaelle – "Give it Back (Eric's Wollman Dub)"
4. Moloko – "Familiar Feeling (Martin Buttrich Remix)"
5. Blue Six – "Music & Wine (Th'attaboy Vocal)"
6. Everything but the Girl vs Soul Vision – "Tracey in My Room (Lazy Dog Bootleg Vocal)"
7. Télépopmusik – "Breathe"
8. Lisa Shaw – "Always (Lovetronic Vocal)"
9. St. Germain – "Rose Rouge"
10. Mr. Scruff – "Get a Move On"
11. Bent – "Swollen (Francois K Vocal)"
12. Sade – "By Your Side (Ben Watt Lazy Dog Remix)"
13. Dirty Vegas – "Days Go By (Album Version)"
14. Hardsoul feat. Ron Carroll – "Back Together (Classic Mix)"
15. X-Press 2 feat. David Byrne – "Lazy"
16. Beth Orton – "Central Reservation (The Then Again Version)"
17. Doctor Rockit – "Café de Flore (Charles Webster's Latin Lovers Mix)"
18. Herbert – "The Audience"

=== Chillout Sessions XI ===
Chillout Sessions XI

Compilation album (mixtape)
- Released: 4 October 2008
- Genre: Chillout
- Label: Ministry of Sound

Chillout Sessions chronology
| Chillout Sessions 10 (2007) | Chillout Sessions XI (2008) | Chillout Sessions XII (2009) |

Chillout Sessions XI is the eleventh installment of the Chillout Sessions series of compilations, released by Ministry of Sound. It is the first of the Chillout Sessions to use Roman Numerals in the title, instead of standard numbers.

Disc One

1. Kasper Bjorke feat. Allison Pierce – "Doesn't Matter (Trentemøller remix)"
2. Radiohead – "Weird Fishes / Arpeggi"
3. José González – "Teardrop"
4. Feist – "So Sorry"
5. Lisa Mitchell – "Neopolitan Dreams"
6. Bat For Lashes – "What's a Girl To Do?"
7. Ratatat – "Falcon Jab"
8. Hot Chip – "Made in the Dark"
9. The Presets – "If I Know You"
10. Sam Sparro – "Black & Gold"
11. Empire of the Sun – "Walking on a Dream"
12. MGMT – "Electric Feel"
13. Cut Copy – "Feel The Love"
14. Sébastien Tellier – "Divine"
15. Ted & Francis – "Erlend"
16. Metronomy – "Heartbreaker"
17. Ladytron – "Ghosts (Modwheelmood Remix)"
18. The Dø – "On My Shoulders"
19. PNAU – "With You Forever"

Disc Two

1. Aeroplane – "Above the Clouds"
2. Al Usher – "Here Today"
3. Low Motion Disco – "Love Love Love (Soft Rocks Remix)"
4. Mission Control – "Innerspace (Long John Saliva remix)"
5. Kaoru Inoue – "The Secret Field (Todd Terje remix)"
6. Popular Computer feat. Pacific! – "Lost & Found"
7. Shazam – "Luckier"
8. 40 Thieves feat. Qzen – "Don't Turn It Off"
9. Cazals – "Life is Boring (Ali Love/Harder Remix)"
10. Amy Winehouse – "Tears Dry on Their Own (Al Usher Remix)"
11. CSS – "Move (Cut Copy Remix)"
12. Panthers – "Goblin City (Holy Ghost! Remix)"
13. Black Kids – "Hurricane Jane (The Twelves Mix)"
14. Bag Raiders – "Shooting Stars"
15. Fred Falke – "909 PM at the Beach"
16. Pacific! – "Break Your Social System"
17. DiskJokke – "Folk I Farta"
18. Rufus Wainwright – "Tiergarten (Supermayer Remix)"

=== Chillout Sessions XII ===
Chillout Sessions XII

Compilation album (mixtape)
- Released: 28 August 2009
- Genre: Chillout
- Label: Ministry of Sound

Chillout Sessions chronology
| Chillout Sessions XI (2008) | Chillout Sessions XII (2009) | Chillout Sessions XIII (2010) |

Chillout Sessions XII is the twelfth installment of the Chillout Sessions series of compilations, released by Ministry of Sound.

Disc One

1. Duffy – "Stepping Stone" (Original mix)
2. Sarah Blasko – All I Want (Original mix)
3. Lisa Mitchell – See You When You Get Here (Original mix)
4. Tame Impala – Sundown Syndrome (Original mix)
5. Fink – Sort of Revolution (Cinematic Orchestra Radio Edit)
6. Josh Pyke – The Summer (Original mix)
7. Miike Snow – Burial (Original mix)
8. Daniel Merriweather feat. Wale – Change (Original mix)
9. Lykke Li – I'm Good, I'm Gone (Original mix)
10. Jenny Wilson – Anchor Made of Gold (Original mix)
11. Peter Bjorn And John – Nothing To Worry About (Original mix)
12. Two Door Cinema Club – Something Good Can Work (Original mix)
13. Lost Valentinos – Serio (Original mix)
14. Au Revoir Simone – Shadows (Original mix)
15. Bat For Lashes – Daniel (Original mix)
16. Ryskee feat. Leslie Ming – Leave Me Amor (Bloody Beetroots Remix)
17. Empire of the Sun – Standing on the Shore (Original mix)
18. MGMT – Weekend Wars (Album Version)
19. The Temper Trap – Sweet Disposition (Original mix)
20. La Roux – In for the Kill (Skream's Let's Get Ravey Remix)
21. Fever Ray – When I Grow Up (Original mix)

Disc Two

1. Grace Jones – Williams' Blood (Greg Wilson Remix)
2. Phoenix – Lisztomania (Classixx Version)
3. Friendly Fires – Paris (Aeroplane Remix)
4. Paul Dempsey – Ramona Was A Waitress (Faux Pas Remix)
5. James Yuill – This Sweet Love (Prins Thomas Sneaky Re-Edit)
6. Damn Arms – Destination Pt 1. (Original mix)
7. Sia – Buttons (CSS Remix)
8. The Golden Filter – Solid Gold (Extended Version)
9. Metric – Help I'm Alive (Original mix)
10. Bertie Blackman – Thump (Wild Turkeys Remix)
11. Lost Valentinos – Thief (Nile Delta Remix)
12. The Juan Maclean – One Day (Original Version)
13. MSTRKRFT feat. John Legend – Heartbreaker (Original mix)
14. Metronomy – A Thing For Me (Breakbot Remix)
15. Ladyhawke – My Delirium (Chateau Marmont Remix)
16. Sébastien Tellier – Kilometre (Original mix)
17. Simian Mobile Disco – Audacity of Huge (Allez Allez Remix)
18. Vampire Weekend – The Kids Don't Stand A Chance (Chromeo Remix)
19. Beni – My Love Sees You (Classixx Version)
20. Grizzly Bear – Two Weeks (Fred Falke Remix)

=== Chillout Sessions XIII ===
Chillout Sessions XIII

Compilation album (mixtape)
- Released: November 2010
- Genre: Chillout
- Length: Disc 1: 79:32; Disc 2: 75:33
- Label: Ministry of Sound

Chillout Sessions chronology
| Chillout Sessions XII (2009) | Chillout Sessions XIII (2010) | Chillout Sessions XIV (2011) |

Chillout Sessions XIII is the thirteenth installment of the Chillout Sessions series of compilations, released by Ministry of Sound.

Disc One

1. Washington – Lover / Soldier
2. Angus & Julia Stone – Big Jet Plane
3. The XX – Islands
4. Sia – I'm in Here
5. Erykah Badu – Window Seat
6. Smoove & Turrell – Without You
7. Bibio – Lover's Carvings
8. Jonathan Boulet – A Community Service Announcement
9. Neon Indian – Deadbeat Summer
10. The Superimposers – The Beach
11. Space Invadas – Imaginist
12. Big Boi ft. Sleepy Brown & Joi – Turns Me On
13. Dan Black ft. Kid Cudi – Symphonies
14. Miike Snow – Sans Soleil
15. The National – Runaway
16. Kings of Convenience – Misread
17. Sally Seltmann – Harmony to My Heartbeat
18. Ernest Ellis – Heading for the Cold
19. Gypsy & The Cat – Time To Wander

Disc Two

1. Smoove & Turrell – The Difference
2. Crazy P – Never Gonna Reach Me (Hot Toddy Remix)
3. Sarah Blasko – Hold on My Heart (The Presets Remix)
4. The Chemical Brothers – Swoon (Lindstrøm & Prins Thomas Re-Edit)
5. Flight Facilities ft. Giselle – Crave You (C90s Remix)
6. Miike Snow – Animal (Mark Ronson Remix)
7. Aeroplane – We Can't Fly
8. Chilly Gonzales – Knight Moves
9. Breakbot ft. Outlines – Baby I'm Yours
10. Miami Horror ft. Alan Palamo – Holidays
11. Little Red – Rock It (Dublin Aunts Remix)
12. Tensnake – Coma Cat
13. Florence & The Machine – Rabbit Heart (Raise It Up) (Leo Zero Remix)
14. The Temper Trap – Sweet Disposition (Cagedbaby Paradise 45 Remix)
15. Robyn – Dancing on My Own (Fred Falke Remix)
16. Project 808 – Pacific 202 (Mark Moore Passionado Remix)
17. Azari & Ill – Reckless With Your Love (Tensnake Remix)
18. Groove Armada – History

=== Chillout Sessions XIV ===
Chillout Sessions XIV

Compilation album (mixtape)
- Released: 25 November 2011
- Genre: Chillout
- Label: Ministry of Sound

Chillout Sessions chronology
| Chillout Sessions XIII (2010) | Chillout Sessions XIV (2011) | Chillout Sessions XV (2012) |

Chillout Sessions XIV is the fourteenth instalment of the Chillout Sessions series of compilations, released by Ministry of Sound.

Disc One

1. Gotye feat. Kimbra – Somebody That I Used To Know (Bibio Remix)
2. Feist – How Come You Never Go There
3. Seeker Lover Keeper – All My Lights
4. Aloe Blacc – I Need A Dollar
5. Asa – Why Can't We
6. Kimbra – Cameo Lover (Electric Empire Remix)
7. Hypnolove – Holiday Reverie
8. Metronomy – The Look
9. Oh Mercy – Let Me Go
10. Little Dragon – Feather
11. Frank Ocean – Swim Good
12. Cut Copy – Need You Now (Architecture in Helsinki Version)
13. The Temper Trap – Fools
14. The Drums – Money
15. Example – Last Ones Standing (Ed Sheeran Remix)
16. Switch & Andrea Martin – I Still Love You
17. Gil Scott-Heron & Jamie xx – I'll Take Care of U
18. The Good Natured – Wolves (Crystal Fighters Remix)
19. Beach House – Norway

Disc Two

1. Washed Out – Eyes Be Closed
2. Blood Orange – Sutphin Boulevard
3. Simone Fedi – Bitter Devotion
4. Clubfeet – Edge of Extremes
5. Flight Facilities feat. Jess – Foreign Language
6. !!! – Steady As The Sidewalk Cracks
7. SBTRKT feat. Roses Gabor – Pharaohs
8. Bibio – Anything New
9. Gigamesh feat. Amanda Love – Red Light
10. Magnifik – We Really Love This Song (Original Mix)
11. Storm Queen – Look Right Through (Vocal Mix)
12. Midnight Magic – Beam Me Up (Jacques Renault Remix)
13. James Curd feat. JDub – We Just Won't Stop
14. Lykke Li – I Follow Rivers (The Magician Remix)
15. Siriusmo – Nights Off
16. Ray Foxx – The Trumpeter (Guti Remix)
17. Omar – Feeling You (Henrik Schwarz Remix)
18. Lovebirds feat. Stee Downes – Want You in My Soul
19. Paul Kalkbrenner – Sky and Sand
20. Mario & Vidis feat. Jazzu – I'll Be Gone (Extended Original)
21. Azari & III – Into The Night (Nicolas Jaar Remix)
22. Bronnt Industries Kapital – An Index of Corporate Art

=== Chillout Sessions XV ===
Chillout Sessions XV

Compilation album (mixtape)
- Released: 16 November 2012
- Genre: Chillout
- Label: Ministry of Sound

Chillout Sessions chronology
| Chillout Sessions XIV (2011) | Chillout Sessions XV (2012) | Chillout Sessions XVI (2013) |

=== Chillout Sessions XV ===
Chillout Sessions XV is the fifteenth installment of the Chillout Sessions series of compilations, released by Ministry of Sound.

Disc One

1. Missy Higgins – Everyone's Waiting
2. Gotye – Eyes Wide Open (Yeasayer Remix)
3. Jessie Ware – Wildest Moments
4. Major Lazer feat. Amber Coffman – Get Free
5. Frank Ocean -Thinkin' Bout You
6. The Bamboos feat. Aloe Blacc – Where Does The Time Go?
7. The Presets – Ghosts
8. Florence + The Machine – Spectrum
9. The XX – Chained
10. Totally Enormous Extinct Dinosaurs – Garden
11. Angus Stone – Broken Brights
12. Alpine – Gasoline
13. Chet Faker – Terms And Conditions
14. Panama – Magic
15. Saint Lou Lou – Maybe You
16. Paloma Faith – Let Me Down Easy
17. Grimes – Genesis
18. Bobby Womack – Please Forgive My Heart
19. Hermitude – HyperParadise
20. The Temper Trap – Trembling Hands

Disc Two

1. Flight Facilities feat. Christine Hoberg – Clair De Lune
2. Hot Chip – Look at Where We Are
3. Goldroom feat. Chela – Fifteen
4. Lana Del Rey – National Anthem (Afterlife Remix)
5. Flume feat. Jezzabell Doran – Sleepless
6. Disclosure feat. Sinead Harnett – Boiling
7. Van She – Jamaica
8. Dune – Shoestring
9. DCUP – I'm Corrupt
10. Munk & Peaches – You Can't Run From My Love
11. Storm Queen – Look Right Through
12. M83 – Reunion (Mylo Remix)
13. Volta Bureau – Alley Cat
14. James Curd – Guide Me
15. Twinsy – Water Bombs
16. The Other Tribe – Skirts
17. Elton John vs Pnau – Phoenix
18. Favored Nation – Blame Game (Alternate Mix)
19. Bloc Party – Octopus (RAC Remix)
20. Purity Ring – Fineshrine
21. LOL Boys feat. Angelina Lucero – Get Close To Me
22. Elizabeth Rose feat. Sinden – Again

=== Chillout Sessions XVI ===
Chillout Sessions XVI

Compilation album (mixtape)
- Released: 22 November 2013
- Genre: Chillout
- Label: Ministry of Sound

Chillout Sessions chronology
| Chillout Sessions XV (2012) | Chillout Sessions XVI (2013) | Chillout Sessions XVII (2014) |

Chillout Sessions XVI is the sixteenth installment of the Chillout Sessions series of compilations, released by Ministry of Sound.

Disc One

1. London Grammar – Strong
2. Chet Faker Feat. Kilo Kish – Melt
3. Lana Del Rey – Summertime Sadness (Radio Mix)
4. Naughty Boy Feat. Sam Smith – La La La (Pále Remix)
5. HAIM – Falling
6. Ben Pearce – What I Might Do (Kilter Remix)
7. Bibio – À Tout À L'Heure
8. Vance Joy – Riptide
9. Jagwar Ma – Come Save Me
10. Big Scary – Luck Now
11. Disclosure Feat. Eliza Doolittle – You & Me (Flume Remix)
12. George Maple – Fixed (Maribou State Remix)
13. Kilter Feat. YOUTH – Hold Me
14. AlunaGeorge – Your Drums, Your Love
15. The Kite String Tangle – Given A Chance
16. Snakadaktal – Fall Underneath
17. MS MR – Hurricane (CHVRCHES Remix)
18. Andy Bull – Baby I Am Nobody Now
19. Ngaiire – Around

Disc Two

1. Hayden James – Permission To Love
2. The Preatures – Is This How You Feel? (Classixx Remix)
3. Phoenix – Trying To Be Cool (Breakbot Remix)
4. Rudimental Feat. Foxes – Right Here (Krystal Klear Remix)
5. Classixx – Holding On
6. Flight Facilities Feat. Elizabeth Rose – I Didn't Believe
7. FCL – It's You (James Curd Remix)
8. Miami Horror – Real Slow
9. RÜFÜS* – Sundream
10. Klangkarussell – Sonnentanz (Radio Version)
11. Storm Queen – Look Right Through (MK Dub III Edit)
12. Favored Nations – The Strain (Nora En Pure Remix)
13. Hot Natured Feat. The Egyptian Lover* – Isis (Magic Carpet Ride)
14. Acaddamy – Gave Up
15. Empire of the Sun – Alive (Gold Fields Remix)
16. Duke Dumont Feat. A*M*E – Need U 100% (Skreamix)
17. Dillon Francis Feat. Totally Enormous Extinct Dinosaurs – Without You
18. Touch Sensitive – Pizza Guy
19. Yolanda Be Cool Feat. Gurrumul* – A Baru in New York (Flume Remix)

=== Chillout Sessions XVII ===
Chillout Sessions XVII

Compilation album (mixtape)
- Released: 21 November 2014
- Genre: Chillout
- Label: Ministry of Sound

Chillout Sessions chronology
| Chillout Sessions XVI (2013) | Chillout Sessions XVII (2014) | Chillout Sessions XVIII (2015) |

Chillout Sessions XVII is the seventeenth installment of the Chillout Sessions series of compilations, released by Ministry of Sound.

Disc One

1. Mr Probz – Waves
2. Angus & Julia Stone – Heart Beats Slow
3. Milky Chance – Stolen Dance
4. Chet Faker – Gold
5. The Preatures – Two Tone Melody
6. Lana Del Rey – West Coast
7. Alt-J – Arrival in Narra
8. Sam Smith – Stay With Me
9. George Maple – Talk Talk
10. London Grammar – If You Wait
11. Gorgon City Feat. Laura Welsh – Here For You (Bearcubs Remix)
12. ZHU – Paradise Awaits
13. The Kite String Tangle – Arcadia
14. ODESZA Feat. Madelyn Grant – Memories That You Call
15. Kilter Feat. Ev Jones – All You Want
16. Vance Joy – Mess Is Mine
17. Jungle – Time
18. Peking Duk Feat. Nicole Millar – High (Yahtzel Remix)
19. Arkon Fly – Back Seat
20. BROODS – Mother & Father
21. Japanese Wallpaper Feat. Wafia – Breathe In
22. BANKS – Beggin' For Thread

Disc Two

1. RÜFÜS – Sarah (Touch Sensitive Remix)
2. Flight Facilities Feat. Emma Louise – Two Bodies
3. Luke Million – Light & Sound
4. Filous Feat. Kitty Georgi – Summer
5. Wankelmut & Emma Louise – My Head Is A Jungle (MK Remix)
6. Flight Facilities Feat. Elizabeth Rose – I Didn't Believe
7. TCTS Feat. K Stewart – Games
8. Oliver $ & Jimi Jules – Pushing On
9. Klingande – Jubel
10. Watermät – Bullit
11. The Magician Feat. Years & Years – Sunlight
12. Favored Nations – The Strain (Nora En Pure Remix)
13. Parra for Cuva Feat. Anna Naklab – Wicked Games
14. Acaddamy – Gave Up
15. Motez – Own Up
16. Bondax – All I See
17. Faul, Wad Ad & Pnau – Changes
18. Caribou – Can't Do Without You
19. Octave Minds – Anthem
20. Shift K3y Feat. Todd Oliver – Touch (Oxford Remix)
21. Tensnake Feat. Nile Rodgers & Fiora – Love Sublime
22. Tkay Maidza – U-Huh (Luke Million Remix)
23. Attaque – Change Your Mind

=== Chillout Sessions XVIII ===
Chillout Sessions XVIII

Compilation album (mixtape)
- Released: 19 November 2015
- Genre: Chillout
- Label: Ministry of Sound

Chillout Sessions chronology
| Chillout Sessions XVII (2014) | Chillout Sessions XVIII (2015) | Chillout Sessions XIX (2016) |

Chillout Sessions XVIII is the eighteenth installment of the Chillout Sessions series of compilations, released by Ministry of Sound.

Disc One

1. Sufjan Stevens – Should Have Known Better
2. Tame Impala – 'Cause I'm A Man
3. Flight Facilities Feat. Owl Eyes – Heart Attack (Julian Hamilton Rework)
4. Daniel Johns – Aerial Love
5. Airling – Stallin'
6. Tuka – My Star
7. Alt-J – Arrival in Narra
8. Sarah Blasko – Only One
9. Favored Nations – I Can See You
10. José González – Let It Carry You
11. Gorgon City Feat. Laura Welsh – Here For You (Bearcubs Remix)
12. Mac DeMarco – The Way You'd Love Her
13. Alabama Shakes – Don't Wanna Fight
14. ODESZA Feat. Madelyn Grant – Memories That You Call
15. Hiatus Kaiyote – By Fire
16. Chet Faker – Bend
17. SG Lewis Feat. Louis Mattrs* – No Less
18. Arkon Fly – Back Seat
19. Flume Feat. Andrew Wyatt – Some Minds
20. Troye Sivan Feat. Broods – EASE
21. A$AP Rocky – L$D
22. SAFIA – Embracing Me
23. Kygo Feat. Will Heard – Nothing Left
24. Paces Feat. Reija Lee – Hold It Down (StéLouse Remix)

Disc Two

1. Basenji Feat. Scenic – Petals
2. Jamie xx Feat. Romy – Loud Places
3. Cosmo's Midnight Feat. KUČKA – Walk With Me
4. Miami Horror Feat. Queen Magic – Sober
5. Wankelmut & Emma Louise – My Head Is A Jungle (MK Remix)
6. Duke Dumont – Ocean Drive
7. Escort – Body Talk
8. Oliver $ & Jimi Jules – Pushing On
9. Set Mo Feat. ALPHAMAMA – Chasing Forever
10. Chez Moune – Away
11. Rudimental Feat. Foy Vance – Never Let You Go (Feder Remix)
12. Favored Nations – The Strain (Nora En Pure Remix)
13. Sigala – Easy Love (Miguel Campbell Remix)
14. POOLCLVB Feat. Natalie Conway – Move Me
15. RÜFÜS – You Were Right
16. Porsches – Karate
17. Faul, Wad Ad & Pnau – Changes
18. Claptone Feat. Peter, Bjorn And John – Puppet Theatre
19. Octave Minds – Anthem
20. Andras & Oscar – (I Know) What You Want
21. Lost Frequencies – Are You With Me
22. LANY – ILYSB (I Love You So Bad)
23. Monkey Safari – Cranes
24. Kölsch Feat. Gregor Schwellenbach – Talbot
25. Gilligan Moss – Choreograph

=== Chillout Sessions XIX ===
Chillout Sessions XIX

Compilation album (mixtape)
- Released: 19 November 2016
- Genre: Chillout
- Label: Ministry of Sound

Chillout Sessions chronology
| Chillout Sessions XVIII (2015) | Chillout Sessions XIX (2016) | Chillout Sessions XX (2018) |

Chillout Sessions XIX is the nineteenth installment of the Chillout Sessions series of compilations, released by Ministry of Sound.

Disc One

1. Vera Blue – Hold
2. Shura – Touch
3. Jack Garratt – Worry
4. Michael Kiwanuka – Love & Hate
5. Sampha – Timmy's Prayer
6. Matt Corby – Knife Edge
7. Låpsley – Cliff
8. Kllo – Walls To Build
9. Kaytranada – Lite Spots
10. Of Empress – Woman Is A Word
11. James Vincent McMorrow – Rising Waters
12. Polographia Feat. Winston Surfshirt – Sly
13. Big Scary – The Opposite of Us
14. Future Islands – Haunted By You
15. Emma Louise – Talk Baby Talk
16. Klue – My Friend
17. Tony Allen Feat. Damon Albarn – Go Back
18. The Avalanches – Subways
19. JNTHN STEIN – CMPRSSN
20. Flume Feat. Tove Lo – Say It

Disc Two

1. Paces Feat. Guy Sebastian – Desert
2. Kings – Don't Worry 'Bout It
3. GoldLink – Dark Skin Women (Cosmo's Midnight & Swindail Remix)
4. The Meeting Tree – Life Is Long: Slow Down!
5. ZHU – Generationwhy
6. Honne & Izzy Bizu – Someone That Loves You
7. Kraak & Smaak Feat. Cleopold – Alone With You
8. D.D Dumbo – Satan
9. Gold Panda – Chiba Nights
10. Zayn – Like I Would (Oliver Nelson Remix)
11. Fatherdude – No Complaints (Dr. Packer Remix)
12. RÜFÜS – Say A Prayer For Me
13. Set Mo – See Right Through Me
14. Rudimental Feat. Joseph Angel – Healing
15. Duke Dumont – Be Here
16. Hayden James – Just A Lover
17. Justin Martin Feat. Femme – Hello Clouds
18. Aurora – I Went Too Far (MK Remix Radio Edit)
19. Dro Carey Feat. Kučka – Queensberry Rules

=== Chillout Sessions XX ===
Chillout Sessions XX

Compilation album (mixtape)
- Released: 27 April 2018
- Genre: Chillout
- Label: Ministry of Sound

Chillout Sessions chronology
| Chillout Sessions XIX (2017) | Chillout Sessions XX (2018) |

Chillout Sessions XX is the twentieth installment of the Chillout Sessions series of compilations, released by Ministry of Sound and was released in April 2018.

Disc One

1. Kygo (featuring Justin Jesso & Bergen Philharmonic Orch) – Stargazing (Orchestral Version)
2. Rhye – Song for you
3. Camelphat & Elderbrook – Cola (Simon Mills Full Sugar Mix)
4. Motez, Antony & Cleopatra – The Future
5. Calvin Harris (featuring Frank Ocean & Migos) – Slide
6. Cosmo's Midnight (featuring Winston Surfshirt) – Get to know
7. Sam Gouthro – Down for this
8. A Tribe Called Quest – Bonita applebum (Pharrell Williams Remix)
9. Kwabs – Wrong or right
10. Leisure – Money
11. Cloud Control – Summer rave
12. Tender – Outside
13. Potbelleez – Here on earth (Winter Fjord Orchestral Mix)
14. Mama Ghost – I ran
15. Sohn – Red lines
16. Lo Moon – Loveless
17. Pilotpriest – Archive Seven
18. Elbow – Mirrorball
19. MGMT – Hand it over
20. Red Box – Everybody's gotta learn sometime.

Disc Two

1. Bonobo – Kerala
2. Icarus – No sleep
3. Braille Face – Faraway
4. POOLCLVB (featuring Doolie) – Freefall
5. Freischwimmer – California dreaming
6. Sneaky Sound System – I love it 2018 (superlover remix)
7. Cali Satellites (featuring TIAAN) – In the sunshine (AG remix)
8. Anabel Englund – London headache
9. Flight Facilities (featuring Broods, Reggie Watts & Saro) – Stranded (LNTG Remix)
10. Luke Million (featuring Fluir) – Alive
11. Home – Warmth
12. Flamingo – Hypnotized
13. Mansionair – Astronaut (something about your love)
14. Elk Road (featuring Julia Stone) – Solid Gold
15. MØ – Turn my heart to stone
16. L D R U (featuring Boi) – Me (Akouo remix)
17. Moby – Porcelain (arty remix)
18. Danny Barwick – Flickering
19. Willow Beats – Be kind to yourself
20. Morgan Saint – You
21. Chicane – Gorecki
22. Wafia (featuring Finneas) – The ending.

== The Chillout Guide ==
The Guide

Compilation album mixtape
- Released: 2001
- Genre: Chillout
- Label: Ministry of Sound

Disc one

1. Fortunato & Montresor – Imagine
2. Yonderboi – Papadam
3. I Monster – Daydream in Blue
4. Groove Armada – At the River
5. Chicane – Offshore (Album Mix)
6. Jakatta – American Dream (Afterlife Mix)
7. Zero 7 – Give It Away
8. Pepe Deluxe Leave (Radio Edit) – Before You Leave
9. Hairy Diamond – Givin Up
10. Brooke Russell – So Sweet (Rae & Christian Remix)
11. Nightmares on Wax – Les Nuits
12. Trio Electrico – Return of the Coconut Groove
13. Trüby Trio – A Go Go (Boozoo Bajou Mix)
14. Boozoo Bajou – Night Over Manaus
15. Serge Gainsbourg – Je T'aime (Dzihan & Kamien Remix)
16. Mo Horizons – Foto Viva
17. Ultra Naté – Twisted (4 Hero Mix)
18. Nils Petter Molvaer – Vilderness (Chilluminati Remix)
19. Beanfield – The Season (Video Edit)
20. Waldeck – This Isn't Maybe

Disc two

1. Seelenluft – Wasser-Kür 1
2. Paul Van Dyk – Vega
3. Chicane – No Ordinary Morning
4. Matthias Schaffhäuser – Hey Little Girl
5. Moby – Natural Blues
6. Orion – Eternity (Acoustic Mix)
7. Afro Medusa – Pasilda (Afterlife Mix)
8. Wamdue Project – King of My Castle (Original Radio Edit)
9. Alex Gopher – The Child
10. Nalin & Kane – Beachball
11. Energy 52 – Café Del Mar (Michael Woods Remix)
12. Underworld – Cups (Salt City Orchestra's Vertical Bacon Vocal)
13. Aural Float – At The Crossroads
14. The Beloved – The Sunrising (Album Mix)
15. Schiller – Das Glockenspiel (Schill Out Mix)
16. The Aloof – One Night Stand (7" Edit)
17. Leftfield – Melt
18. Gregory Isaacs – Night Nurse (Kruder & Dorfmeister Remix)
19. Dusted – Always Remember To Respect And Honour Your Mother
20. Fischerspooner – The 15th

== Chilled 1991–2008 ==
=== Disc 1 ===
1. Little Fluffy Clouds – The Orb
2. Clubbed to Death (Kurayamino Variation) – Rob Dougan
3. Sweet Harmony – The Beloved
4. Smokebelch II (Beatless Mix) – The Sabres of Paradise
5. Offshore – Chicane
6. Fireside Favourite – Groove Armada
7. Fanfare of Life – Leftfield
8. Fun For Me – Moloko
9. Demons – Fatboy Slim featuring Macy Gray
10. Underwater Love – Smoke City
11. Yachts – A Man Called Adam Vs. Coco Steel & Lovebomb
12. Waltz For Koop – Koop
13. One Night Samba – Tim "Love" Lee
14. Exploration – The Karminsky Experience Inc.
15. Past – Sub Sub
16. Ocean Beach (Cybophonia Cinematic Remix) – The Black Mighty Orchestra
17. Autumn Leaves (Irresistible Force Mix Trip 1) – Coldcut
18. Second Hand – Underworld
19. Les Nuits – Nightmares on Wax
20. Moments in Love – Art of Noise

=== Disc 2 ===
1. Barber's Adagio for Strings (Ferry Corsten Remix) – William Orbit
2. His Majesty King Raam – Lemon Jelly
3. Daydream in Blue – I Monster
4. La Ritournelle – Sébastien Tellier
5. Romeo (Acoustic Version) – Basement Jaxx
6. Heaven (Yanou's Candlelight Mix) – DJ Sammy
7. I Love My Man – Bent
8. Since I Left You – The Avalanches
9. Corner of the Earth – Jamiroquai
10. Lebanese Blonde – Thievery Corporation
11. Once Around The Block (Andy Votel Remix) – Badly Drawn Boy
12. Can't Be Doin' With Love – Cicada
13. Kota – Bonobo
14. Sleepy Meadows of Buxton – Fenomenon
15. The Sensual Woman – The Herbaliser
16. Heartbeats – José González
17. Dice – Finley Quaye
18. Young Folks (OrtzRoka Remix) – Peter Bjorn & John
19. Hayling – FC Kahuna
20. Nude – Radiohead

=== Disc 3 ===
1. American Dream – Jakatta
2. Missing (Todd Terry Club Remix) – Everything But The Girl
3. 2 Lazy – X-Press 2
4. Do It Now – Dubtribe Sound System
5. Prix Choc – Etienne De Crecy
6. Swimming Places (Sebastian Ingrosso Re-Edit) – Julien Jabre
7. In My Arms – Mylo
8. Bumcop – Crazy P
9. I Feel Space – Lindstrøm
10. Eple – Röyksopp
11. I Believe – Simian Mobile Disco
12. Café De Flore – dr. rockit
13. Divebomb – The Whip
14. Deepest Blue (Jon Hopkins Mix) – Deepest Blue
15. Another Chance (Afterlife Remix) – Roger Sanchez
16. Rapture (Soulside Remix) – iiO
17. Sun (Kössin Mix) – Slusnik Luna
18. Greece 2000 (Moowatcher Mix) – Three Drives
19. Silence (Michael Woods Remix) – Delerium
20. Finished Symphony (Soundtrack Edit) – Hybrid

== Chilled II 1991–2009 ==
Chilled II 1991–2009

Compilation album (mixtape)
- Released: 2009
- Genres: Chillout, Electronic
- Label: Ministry of Sound

The first sequel, Chilled II 1991–2009, was released on 17 May 2009.

The cover art for the album used on the slipcase depicts the Ministry of Sound logo uprising out of water.

Although well received, some criticism has been made for CD 3 of the album, with many describing it as dance music rather than chill out.

=== Disc 1 ===
1. 808 State – Pacific State
2. The Beloved – Sun Rising
3. Leftfield – Original
4. Primal Scream & Denise Johnson – Don't Fight It, Feel It
5. Sneaker Pimps – Underground
6. Groove Armada – At The River
7. St. Germain – Dub Experience II
8. A Man Called Adam – Barefoot in the Head
9. Moloko – Sing It Back
10. Kinobe – Slip into Something More Comfortable
11. Rae & Christian feat. Veba – Spellbound
12. Aim – Cold Water Music
13. Ballistic Brothers – Blacker
14. Mr. Scruff – Get A Move On
15. Cut La Roc – New York Pimp
16. Kruder & Dorfmeister – Black Baby
17. World Party – Is It Too Late (Peter Lorimer Mix)
18. The Prodigy – 3 Kilos
19. Olive – You're Not Alone (Nightmares on Wax Mix)
20. Deadly Avenger – We Took Pelham

=== Disc 2 ===
1. Coldplay – Trouble
2. Air – All I Need
3. Faithless – Drifting Away
4. Zero 7 – Destiny
5. Lemon Jelly – In The Bath
6. Roots Manuva – Witness (1 Hope)
7. Max Sedgley – Happy
8. Daft Punk – Digital Love
9. Mylo – Valley of the Dolls
10. Jakatta – The Other World
11. Cicada – Elle Et Moi
12. Fatboy Slim – North West Three
13. Space Raiders – Beautiful Crazy
14. Thievery Corporation – The Cosmic Game
15. Pilote – Turtle (Bonobo Remix)
16. Flunk – Blue Monday
17. Maxence Cyrin – Unfinished Sympathy
18. Nouvelle Vague – Teenage Kicks
19. Nightmares on Wax – Calling
20. Tom Middleton – Serendipity
21. Unkle – Tired of Sleeping

=== Disc 3 ===
1. Jakatta – American Dream (Intro)
2. Eric Prydz – Pjanoo (Dana Berquist & Peter G Remix)
3. Kid Cudi vs. Crookers – Day 'n' Nite (D.O.N.S. Remix)
4. Deep Dish – The Future of the Future
5. Jean Jaques Smoothie – 2 People
6. Underworld – Cups (Salt City Orchestra Mix)
7. Jam & Spoon – Stella
8. Kings of Tomorrow – Finally
9. Röyksopp – Poor Leno
10. Bent – Magic Love
11. Étienne de Crécy – Le Patron Est Devenu Fou! ("The Boss Has Gone Mad")
12. Marshall Jefferson vs. Noosa Heads – Mushrooms (Salt City Orchestra Mix)
13. Moby – Go (Subliminal Mix)
14. Djuma Soundsystem – Les Djinns
15. Alan Braxe & Fred Falke – Chrystal City
16. Sébastien Tellier – Kilometer (A-Trak Remix)
17. Friendly Fires – Paris (Aeroplane Remix)
18. Williams – Love on a Real Train (Williams Odyssey Remix)
19. Lindstrøm & Prins Thomas – En Dag I Mai
20. StoneBridge feat. Therese – Put 'Em High (Claes Rosen Lounge Mix)
21. Chicane – Salt Water

== Chilled Acoustic ==
The second sequel, Chilled Acoustic, was released on 17 May 2010. It is themed to chillout songs which use acoustic guitars, following the themed Anthems Electronic 80s release in November 2009.

A printing error was made on every copy of the album. The top half of the Ministry of Sound logo, which appears on the reverse side of the digipack, is accidentally printed upside down. This error, however, has never been corrected for future releases.

== Chillout Afterhours ==
The fourth installment album in the series was released in May 2011, Chilled Afterhours. It is an album designed for "after hours" playing.

== Chilled Sessions ==
Released on the same day as Chilled 1991–2008, a specific download release, titled Chilled Sessions, was released. It can be purchased as an MP3 download on Amazon.co.uk.

The album itself is a download replacement for Chilled 1991–2008, which was never released as a download. It contains twenty-three of the sixty tracks on the album. Its art work is slightly similar, but there is a light blue background rather than a white one, the image is zoomed-in, and the words "Chilled Sessions" appear obviously instead of "Chilled 1991–2008".
