= Mr. Gorgeous (and Miss Curvaceous) =

1997 single by Smoke City

Single by Smoke City

from the album Flying Away
- B-side: "Numbers"
- Released: 1997
- Length: 4:20
- Label: Virgin; Jive
- Songwriters: Marc Brown; Chris Franck; Nina Miranda
- Producers: Smoke City; Mike Nielsen

Smoke City singles chronology
"Underwater Love" (1997)	"Mr. Gorgeous (and Miss Curvaceous)" (1997)	"Águas de Março" (1998)

"Mr. Gorgeous (and Miss Curvaceous)" is a 1997 hit by English electronic group Smoke City. Written by the three group members and produced by the group with Mike Nielsen, the song did not experience worldwide success like their debut single, "Underwater Love", but did become a number-one hit in Italy in September 1997.

== Critical reception ==
British magazine Music Week rated "Mr. Gorgeous (and Miss Curvaceous)" three out of five, describing it as "a dreamy, jazzy acoustic guitar-based tune. Its naggingly insistent "aye-aye-aye" chorus plus Mood II Swing and Hyperspace mixes make it a strong contender." Daisy & Havoc from RM gave it five out of five. They added, "Smoke City cope with the difficult follow-up to a hit single very well here by choosing this cheeky irresistible little summer number as the next move after 'Underwater Love'. Guitars are astrumming and the vocal is excellent–watch out for the singlalong "ay ay ay" chorus..."

== Track listings ==
- UK cassette single
1. "Mr. Gorgeous (and Miss Curvaceous)" (radio edit) – 4:05
2. "Mr. Gorgeous (and Miss Curvaceous)" (Mood II Swing vocal mix) – 9:20
- UK and Italian maxi-CD single
1. "Mr. Gorgeous (and Miss Curvaceous)" (radio edit) – 4:05
2. "Mr. Gorgeous (and Miss Curvaceous)" (Hyperspace dub) – 5:35
3. "Mr. Gorgeous (and Miss Curvaceous)" (Mood II Swing vocal mix) – 9:20
4. "Numbers" – 4:21
- Italian 12-inch vinyl

A1. "Mr. Gorgeous (and Miss Curvaceous)" (LP version) – 4:20
A2. "Numbers" – 4:21
B1. "Mr. Gorgeous (and Miss Curvaceous)" (Mood II Swing vocal mix) – 9:20
B2. "Mr. Gorgeous (and Miss Curvaceous)" (Hyperspace dub) – 5:35

== Personnel ==
Personnel are adapted from the UK maxi-CD single liner notes.

- Smoke City – production
  - Marc Brown – writing
  - Chris Franck – writing
  - Nina Miranda – writing, artwork design
- Phil Hartley – bassoon
- Mike Nielsen – extra backing vocals, production, recording engineer
- Toni Economides – extra backing vocals, programming
- Paul Mouzouros – extra backing vocals
- Ben Hillier – mixing
- Zombart (UK) AK – artwork design
- Dave Hindley – photography

== Charts ==
Chart (1997)	Peak position
Australia (ARIA)	168
Italy (Musica e dischi)	1
Italy Airplay (Music & Media)	2
