= Batu (group) =

British music group

Batu were a British dance music group influenced by Brazilian music.

Formed in early 1992, in Brighton, England, and disbanded in late 1994, this group featured Bebeto De Souza, a native of São Paulo, Brazil, as well as the vocals of Sharon Scott.

Full members included Chris Franck, Carl Smith, Kevin Alexander, Sharon Scott, Franc O'Shea, Tristan Banks, Bebeto De Souza, Oli Savill, and Patrick Forge. Some of the artists went on to form another Brazilian outfit called Da Lata, spearheaded by Forge and Franck and featuring the vocals of Lilliana Chachian and Nina Miranda. However, before this, many of them contributed to and were a part of several other projects throughout the 1990s.
