= All God's Creatures =

- Directed by: Ryan Charles; Frank Licata
- Written by: Josh Folan; Billy Fox
- Produced by: Josh Folan; Matt Jared
- Starring: Josh Folan; Jessica Kaye; Tiffany Lee; Adam Barnett; Ginger Kroll; Carson Grant
- Cinematography: Frank Licata
- Edited by: Ryan Charles
- Release date: June 4, 2011
- Running time: 83 minutes
- Country: United States
- Language: English

All God's Creatures is an American romantic thriller feature-length film distributed by Osiris Entertainment that premiered at the 2011 Hoboken International Film Festival on June 4, 2011. The film was directed by Ryan Charles and Frank Licata (Nitty Gritty Studios), produced by Matt Jared (Sid and Nancy Productions), and written and produced by Josh Folan (NYEH Entertainment).

== Plot ==
Jon, a man who hates women, brings a woman back to his apartment after a night out. He pours wine for them, but drugs Jeanie's and she passes out. He wraps her in a plastic tarp and places duct tape over her mouth and proceeds to stab her to death with a screw driver. He dismembers her body, keeping her hand in a jar as a memento.

Jon is working as a barista when Delia comes in, flirts with him, and he imagines attacking her and quickly decides to make her his next victim. Jon goes out that evening and a prostitute offers him a "date", which he accepts and then strangles her. Delia works as an escort, and has taken out an ad online on Craigslist.

Delia comes back into the coffee shop and they flirt more. She asks him to take her out, and they go to a bar. Delia tells him she just moved to town and her parents are dead. She is trying to save money so that she can bring her little sister, Lydia, to live with her. He tells her he is a neat freak. At the end of the night, they are in front of the building Jon lives in. She wants to come up to his place, but he makes lame excuses why he cannot. Delia gets his phone number and leaves. Jon calls an escort to come over, and he hits her with a hammer, killing her.

Back at the coffee shop, Jon anxiously watches for Delia to come in and is disappointed when she does not and goes to her apartment. He invites her to go to the movies with him. At the coffee shop again, Jon asks Delia to come behind the counter and they make prank calls. She remembers she has an appointment with a client at a hotel. Jon is visibly upset that she left, goes home and clears out the jars of body parts and paints the walls.

Delia goes to an appointment with a career counselor who offers her a job as an elevator operator. She walks by the coffee shop and sees that Jon is not there. She calls Lydia and leaves a voicemail telling her to get some things together and that she is going to go get her. Jon calls and says he wanted to surprise her by cooking her dinner since he feels bad about standing her up the night before. She is about to tell him she cannot go, but changes her mind.

At Jon's place, Delia excitedly tells him about her new job, and she accidentally spills wine onto the carpet. He looks at her enraged, but laughs about it and they begin to make out and then go to his bedroom to have sex. While she is waiting for Delia to pick her up, Lydia's stepfather has figured out her plan to run away and tells her he won't let her go and he rapes her. The next morning, Jon makes Delia breakfast in bed, but she says she has to leave. Jon is insulted when he tells her what they did was special to him, and it was not to her.

After she leaves, Jon continues to call her on the phone, but she doesn't answer. Delia arrives at the house to get Lydia, and finds her body in the bathtub and sees that she has committed suicide. Jon goes out to a bar that evening and gets drunk. A girl hits on him, thinking he is a professional baseball player for The Mets and he takes her home with him. He strangles her to death as they have sex on the couch.

Delia walks in and not being sure what she saw, Jon grabs her and covers her mouth. He lets her go and she asks why he has not killed her yet. She helps him clean up the mess and they throw the body into a river. They make a plan to kill Delia's stepfather. They wait for his train to come in and they strangle him, but they see he his still alive and stab him to death with a broken bottle.

== Cast ==
- Josh Folan as Jon
- Jessica Kaye as Delia
- Tiffany Lee as Lydia
- Adam Barnett as The Stepfather

== Soundtrack ==
The film's soundtrack was released by Warlock Records on July 17, 2012. Track listing:

- When In Rome - written and performed by Des Roar
- How Much Is Too Much - written and performed by Des Roar
- Morning Shower - written and performed by The Dangerous Maybes
- Smooth - written and performed by Car Stereo Wars
- Not Over For Me - written and performed by Des Roar
- Confessions Of A White, Widowed Male - written and performed by Des Roar
- Ted Bundy Was A Lady's Man - written and performed by Des Roar
- Across The Ocean - written and performed by The Dangerous Maybes
- Dearheart - written and performed by Car Stereo Wars
- Breath Before Water - written and performed by Molotov Elysian
- Cerequil Caracell - written and performed by Ajar
- Let It Slide - written and performed by Ajar
- Mirages - written and performed by Molotov Elysian

== Awards and honors ==
- Best Screenplay Nomination (Josh Folan and Billy Fox): 2011 Hoboken International Film Festival
- Best Actress Nomination (Jessica Kaye): 2011 Hoboken International Film Festival
- Best Screenplay Nomination (Josh Folan): 2009 Queens International Film Festival
