= School for Seduction =

- School for Seduction film poster
- Directed by: Sue Heel
- Written by: Sue Heel; Martin Herron
- Produced by: Christine Alderson; Steve Bowden
- Starring: Kelly Brook; Dervla Kirwan; Margi Clarke; Jessica Johnson
- Distributed by: Redbus Film Distribution
- Release date: 14 May 2004
- Running time: 104 minutes
- Country: United Kingdom
- Language: English

School for Seduction is a 2004 British film directed by Sue Heel. The plot involves an Italian temptress (played by Kelly Brook) who arrives at a school in Newcastle to teach a group of Geordies about the art of romance.

== Incidental music ==
Music in the film included:

- Slip Into Something More Comfortable - Kinobe

== Cast ==
- Kelly Brook – Sophia Rosselini
- Emily Woof – Kelly
- Dervla Kirwan – Clare Hughes
- Margi Clarke – Irene
- Jessica Johnson – Donna
- Neil Stuke – Craig Hughes
- Tim Healy – Derek
- Jake Canuso – Giovanni
- Jody Baldwin – Gail
- Sharon Percy – Karen
- Sophie Dix – Receptionist
- Donald McBride – Jimmy
- Duncan Bannatyne – Derek's friend
