= Shrift =

Shrift may refer to:

- Confession
- Absolution
- Shrift (band), a band with vocalist Nina Miranda
