= Alternative dance =

Music genre fusing alternative rock and dance

- Other names: Indie dance; underground dance
- Stylistic origins: Post-disco; alternative rock; indie rock; post-punk; new wave; synth-pop; house
- Cultural origins: Early 1980s, United Kingdom
- Typical instruments: Synthesizers
- Derivative forms: Electroclash; new rave; grebo

Subgenres
- Baggy

Regional scenes
- Madchester

Other topics
- Electronic rock; indietronica; industrial rock; big beat; chillwave

Alternative dance (also known as indie dance or underground dance in the United States) is a musical genre that mixes alternative rock with electronic dance music. Although largely confined to the British Isles, it has gained worldwide exposure through acts such as New Order in the 1980s and the Prodigy in the 1990s.

== Characteristics ==
AllMusic states that alternative dance mixes the "melodic song structure of alternative and indie rock with electronic beats, synths and/or samples, and club orientation of post-disco dance music". The Sacramento Bee calls it "postmodern–Eurosynth–technopop–New Wave in a blender".

The genre draws heavily on club culture for inspiration while incorporating other styles of music such as electropop, house, and EBM. The performers of alternative dance are closely identified with their music through a signature style, texture, or fusion of specific musical elements. They are usually signed to small record labels.

== History ==
=== 1980s–90s ===
Many of the alternative dance artists are British, "owing to the greater prominence of the UK's club and rave scenes in underground musical culture". New Order are cited by AllMusic as the genre's first group because of their 1982–83 recordings, which merged post-punk with electro/synth pop in the style of German group Kraftwerk. Alternative dance had a major impact on Britain's late-1980s Madchester scene (adapted from Manchester, New Order's home city) and 1990s trip hop and rave scenes. The Haçienda club in Manchester, founded by New Order and Factory Records, became the hub of the genre in 1980s Britain. Meanwhile, indie-orientated acts such as Saint Etienne, Dubstar, Space and White Town also explored dance beats and rhythms in their music.

The Prodigy, Fatboy Slim and the Chemical Brothers are prominent examples of British artists in the post-Madchester-era, who crossed over from the dance music world to alternative, with most of their releases falling under the big beat music genre in the mid 1990s. Of the three acts, the Prodigy had the first international alternative dance hit when their third studio album The Fat of the Land debuted at number one in 25 countries, including the US, in 1997. Also finding international success in the 1990s was Icelandic musician Björk, a former member of indie band the Sugarcubes, whose solo albums Debut (1993) and Post (1995), incorporated alternative dance elements and featured production from artists like Tricky, Howie B and 808 State's Graham Massey.

In the US, Chicago's Liquid Soul to San Francisco's Dubtribe expanded dance music "beyond its old identity as a singles-driven genre with no identifiable, long-term artists". The American scene rarely received radio airplay and most of the innovative work continued underground or was imported.

=== 2000s–present ===
As computer technology and music software became more accessible and advanced at the start of the 21st century, bands tended to forgo traditional studio production practices. High quality music was often conceived using little more than a single laptop computer. Such advances led to an increase in the amount of home-produced electronic music, including alternative dance, available via the Internet. According to BBC Radio 1 DJ Annie Mac, part of the strength of the scene in the new millennium was "the sense of community"; she noted, "Websites, blogs and Myspace pages all get people talking about records and checking out each other's recommendations. It's not like the old club scene, where these established DJs dictated what would be big. Word-of-mouth is so important now."

In the early 2000s, the term "electroclash" was used to denote artists such as Fischerspooner and Ladytron who mixed new wave with electronic music. The Electroclash festival was held in New York in 2001 and 2002, with subsequent tours across the US and Europe in 2003 and 2004. In the mid-2000s, the British music magazine NME popularised the term "new rave" ("new wave" and "rave") to describe the music of bands such as Klaxons, whose rock aesthetic includes paraphernalia from the 1990s rave scene such as glowsticks and neon lights.

== See also ==
- Electronic dance music
- Computational musicology
- Gospel music
- Rock music
- Soul music
