= Chilled =

Chilled may refer to:

- Chilled food
- Chilled, 2nd album of Ministry of Sound Anthems 2008
- Chilled (EP)
