= Slip Into Something More Comfortable =

Single by Kinobe

from the album Soundphiles (US, 2000)
- A-side: "Slip Into Something More Comfortable (9230260)"
- B-side: "Hombré"
- Released: 3 July 2000
- Recorded: 2000
- Genre: Downtempo
- Length: 3:45
- Label: Zomba Records
- Producer: Kinobe

Kinobe singles chronology
"Good Migrations" (2000)	"Slip Into Something More Comfortable" (2000)	"Grass Roots Horizon" (2001)

"Slip Into Something More Comfortable" is a single released in July 2000 by the British electronic group Kinobe. It features sampling from the work of Engelbert Humperdinck, primarily from the intro to Humperdinck's "From Here to Eternity" recorded in 1968.

It appeared on the album Soundphiles, released on 17 July 2000, as track 6. The music was published by Zomba Music Publishers Ltd.

The Times described the record as 'fragrant with half-remembered allusions to paradisiacal Far Eastern locations in Sixties movies, undercut with an implied melancholic realisation that all this concocted splendour is impossible, a mere musical mirage'. Kinobe would play The Big Chill (music festival) in 2001, at Lulworth Castle in south Dorset.

== Composer ==
The main sample was written by Frederick Maxwell Karger (February 1916 - August 5 1979), who married actress Jane Wyman on November 1 1952 and March 11 1961. He was the son of Maxwell Karger. Jane Wyman was the first wife of Ronald Reagan, having daughter Maureen Reagan. Karger had a daughter to his first wife Patti Sacks, who he married on August 4 1940. When a vocal coach on March 10 1948, at Columbia Pictures, a 21-year-old Marilyn Monroe fell deeply in love with him, becoming his girlfriend for around a year. Marilyn lived with her drama coach Natasha Lytess, opposite Karger and his daughter. Karger did not view Marilyn Monroe as a reliable enough stepmother for his new daughter, after she had lied to him. The other writer of the sample also wrote The Christmas Song (Chestnuts Roasting) with Mel Tormé, in 1945.

The main sample appeared on A Man Without Love (album), from a 1953 film.

== Production ==
It was produced with Ben & Jason. It features harps and glissandi violins.

The backing vocals were Zoe Wheeler and Ellisha West, it was mixed by Jim Brumby with the string arrangement by Chris Elliott, being produced at Battery Studios, and mixed at Strongroom.

The 12" version was released in 2001, with artwork designed by Christopher Thomas Allen, and photography by Harriet Fuller

== Recordings ==
- List of Café del Mar compilations, Vol 21
- Chillout Sessions Chilled II 1991–2009, disc 1, track 10
- Chilled Ibiza, disc 1, track 1
- Ultra.Chilled 02, released by Ultra Records, produced by David Waxman, track 2 on CD 2, released April 2002
- Now That's What I Call Chilled, CD 3 Track 9, released August 18 2014

== Film music ==
The music has appeared in films:

- Disco Pigs (2001)
- School for Seduction (2004)

== Other ==
- Burn the Floor musical
- Television advert for Kronenbourg 1664, entitled Femme Fatale (2001)
- Television advert for SKYY vodka
- Television advert for Fox's Fabulous Cookies

== Similar music ==
- 6 Underground (song) (1996)
- LeRoy Holmes 1968 album Los Violines del Amor, from the intro of Inolvidable
- Underwater Love (Smoke City song) (1997)

== Charts ==
2000 weekly chart performance for "Slip Into Something More Comfortable"
Chart (2000)	Peak position
UK Singles (OCC)	192

2001 weekly chart performance for "Slip Into Something More Comfortable" (re-release)
Chart (2001)	Peak position
UK Indie (Official Charts)	11
UK Singles (Official Charts)	78
