= Joe Caffrey =

English actor

- Born: 1966 (age 59–60); Wallsend, Northumberland, England
- Education: London Academy of Music and Dramatic Art
- Occupation: Actor
- Years active: 1989–present

Joe Caffrey (born 1966) is an English actor of theatre, television, and film.

== Biography ==
Caffrey was born in the shipbuilding town of Wallsend, Northumberland. His father had worked at Swan Hunter's Shipyards and both of his grandfathers were miners. Joe's grandfather, Ned Murray, was an active trade unionist and Labour Party politician as well as a district councilor. His mother, Lynne, is a councillor in Gateshead.

Caffrey chose to become an actor and was trained for three years at the London Academy of Music and Dramatic Art. In 1984-85 he was also a member of the a cappella band, The Workey Tickets, who did several fund raising gigs, including a gig at the Albert Hall in London, for the striking miners and their families.

Caffrey first began performing theatre in London. He achieved West End stardom in Lee Hall's farce Cooking with Elvis. He had also several TV appearances in ITV and BBC productions and appeared in the Bridget Jones film, The Edge of Reason (2004).

He played Billy's older brother Tony in the original London cast of Billy Elliot the Musical and then returned to the show in December 2008, this time in the role of Jackie Elliot, Billy's father.

According to his own words, Caffrey is a huge fan of playwright Alan Plater. He says: "When you get a writer of Alan's calibre saying 'I'm going to write you a part in this' you think 'Christ almighty, most actors would bite your hand off for that kind of chance.'"

Caffrey is associated with Live Theatre which is a small theatre on Newcastle's Quayside, which has nurtured actors that now perform in The Pitmen Painters who have progressed to London's West End and Broadway.

== Career ==
Joe Caffrey's career began at the age of 22 after leaving the London Academy of Music and Dramatic Art (LAMDA).

=== Joe's TV and film credits include ===
- Clay (2008) BBC .... Dennis Hagen
- Doctors BBC D.I. Matthew Squires (14 episodes, 2007)
  - Shreds (2007) TV episode .... D.I. Matthew Squires
  - Blind Drunk (2007) TV episode .... D.I. Matthew Squires
  - Lonely Hearts (2007) TV episode .... D.I. Matthew Squires
  - Invisible Touch (2007) TV episode .... D.I. Matthew Squires
  - Second Helpings (2007) TV episode .... D.I. Matthew Squires
- Heartbeat ITV Seth Mottram (1 episode, 2006)
  - This Happy Breed
- The Bill ITV Ben Perkins (14 episodes, 2004-2005)
  - 375 (2005) TV episode .... Ben Perkins
  - 374 (2005) TV episode .... Ben Perkins
  - 371 (2005) TV episode .... Ben Perkins
  - 352 (2005) TV episode .... Ben Perkins
  - 326 (2005) TV episode .... Ben Perkins
- Distant Shores ITV Maurice (1 episode, 2005)
- Byker Grove BBC Paul / ... (10 episodes, 1990-1993 & 2004)
  - Episode No. 16.15 (2004) TV episode .... Alan Best
  - Episode No. 16.13 (2004) TV episode .... Alan Best
  - Episode No. 16.12 (2004) TV episode .... Alan Best
  - Episode No. 16.9 (2004) TV episode .... Alan Best
  - Episode No. 4.18 (1992) TV episode .... Paul
- Attachments .... Matt (1 episode, 2000)
  - Money Shot
- The Last Musketeer (2000) ITV .... Joe Salter
- Holby City .... Les (1 episode, 1999)
  - Search for the Hero (1999) TV episode .... Les
- Badger .... Chef (1 episode, 1999)
  - It's a Jungle Out There (1999) TV episode .... Chef
- Colour Blind (1998) TV mini-series .... Tony (unknown episodes)

... a.k.a. Catherine Cookson's Colour Blind (UK: complete title)

- Ain't Misbehavin' (1997) TV mini-series .... Corporal Jennings (3 episodes)
- Hetty Wainthropp Investigates .... Jake Vincent (1 episode, 1997)
  - Daughter of the Regiment (1997) TV episode .... Jake Vincent
- Soldier Soldier ITV.... Fus Peter Shortland (1 episode, 1996)
  - Beast
- Fighting for Gemma ITV (1993) .... Russell
- Spender .... Gene Hackett (1 episode, 1991)
  - Double Jeopardy

=== Film work includes ===
- In Fading Light Amber Films/Film 4 (1989) .... Yopper
- Women in Tropical Places Film 4 (1989) .... Jerry

Joe has also been involved in writing and performing in some sketches for the charity event, Sunday for Sammy in 2006, 2008 and 2010.

== Theatre ==
- Cooking With Elvis (1998-2001) by Lee Hall - Live Theatre - Dad/Elvis
- We the People (2007) by Eric Schlosser - Shakespeare's Globe - Gerry
- Love's Labour's Lost (2007) - Shakespeare's Globe - Costard
- Much Ado About Nothing (2011) - Shakespeare's Globe - Borachio / Friar

In December 2008, Joe Caffrey rejoined the cast of Billy Elliot as Jackie Elliot, Billy's dad.
