= Patrick Forge =

Patrick Forge (born Ipswich, Suffolk) is a British jazz, jazz-dance and soul music DJ who spent much of the late 1980s and early 1990s DJing alongside Gilles Peterson at Dingwalls club in Camden, North London.

In the 1980s, Forge worked for Reckless Records in London, and joined the pirate radio station Kiss FM, which obtained a legal license in September 1990. He was also a contributor to the cult black music magazine Soul Underground between 1988 and 1990. He is credited with Trevor Wyatt with the compilation of tracks on the Rebirth of Cool Six CD, released in August 1996 by 4th & Broadway (Island Records).

His show on Kiss 100, "The Cosmic Jam" from 0100 to 0300 on Sunday nights, used to dovetail with his old colleague Gilles Peterson, who was on BBC Radio 1 from 2300 to 0100. However, Peterson's show has since moved back to its original slot on a Wednesday night, but at a later time, from 0200 to 0400. "The Cosmic Jam" was a two-hour show broadcast on Sunday nights on Mi-Soul. As of 2019, Forge has a monthly show on NTS radio which is of a similar format to "The Cosmic Jam".

The two DJs play similar styles of music, have played at numerous clubs and also music weekenders. If anything Forge strays more into Latin Jazz styles more than Gilles, but has also been known to include tracks from Crosby Stills and Nash, Pentangle, America and Ellen McIlwaine.

He is also a member of Brazilian influenced group Da Lata. He has worked with or in collaboration with numerous other groups, including Batu, a group from the early to mid 1990s that also featured Da Lata members Christian Franck, Lillian Chachian and contributors such as Oli Savill, among others. One of Forge's most well known spots is "Brazilian Love Affair" as well as "Sunday Afternoon at Dingwalls", in which Forge on his own, or in collaboration with other DJs perform live sets.
