= Shrift (band) =

Shrift was a collaboration between former Smoke City vocalist Nina Miranda and producer Dennis Wheatley. Their debut release, Lost In A Moment, brought together acoustic and electronic soundscapes with Miranda's vocals, drawing comparisons with Portishead. "It's all swirling atmosphere, with fingerpicked guitars, glimmering string sections, Brazilian and synthetic percussion and gusty echoes around Ms. Miranda's limpid voice," wrote Jon Pareles in The New York Times.

Wheatley is best known for his work with the British electronic band Atlas.

== Discography ==
- Lost in a Moment (2006), Six Degrees
- Shrift Remixed EP (2007), Six Degrees
