= Sharon Percy =

British actress (born 1971)

- Sharon Percy - Portfolio
- Born: 28 September 1971 (age 55); Newcastle upon Tyne, England
- Website: http://www.sharonpercy.com

Sharon Percy (born 28 September 1971) is a British actress.

== Biography ==
Percy was born 28 September 1971 in Newcastle upon Tyne, England. Percy started her acting career at the age of eight. She joined the youth theatre at the New Tyne Theatre, and stayed as a member until she was eighteen. After a performing arts course at Newcastle College, Percy was spotted by Live Theatre Company's Artistic Director Max Roberts, and was cast in the play Your Home In The West alongside Geordie favourites like Robson Green and Charlie Hardwick.

Since then, Percy has worked in theatre, television and radio productions, including a production of Cooking with Elvis in London’s West End with comedian Frank Skinner, Granada’s Cracker with Robbie Coltrane and Ricky Tomlinson, and is featured in the feature film School for Seduction starring Kelly Brook and Tim Healy.

== Filmography ==
- I, Daniel Blake (2016)
- Henry (2011)
- The Ball (2010)
- Because I Love You (2009) .... Angie
- Kaz (2006)
- Wicked (2005) .... Rita
- Time for Bed (2004) .... Andrea
- School for Seduction (2003) .... Karen
- Billy Elliot (1999) .... Jenny Poulson
- The Student Prince (1997) .... Karen

== Television ==
- Joe Maddison's War
- Grumpy Old Holiday
- Steel River Blues
- 55 Degrees North
- The Welsh in Shakespeare
- Byker Grove
- Cracker
- Finney
- Harry
- Mean Streets
- Sex In The Dark
- The Audition
- The Venchie
- Funny Man
- Walter Wall Commercial
- Winns Insurance Commercial
- Vera

== Theatre ==
- Chalet Lines
- The Magical Mess Up
- You'll Never Hook A Haddock
- The Last Post
- Cooking with Elvis
- Sleeping Beauty
- Twelve Tales of Tyneside
- Blow Your House Down
- And A Nightingale Sang
- The Swinging Sisters
- Jack and the Beanstalk
- Dick Whittington
- Christmas Cat and The Pudding Pirates
- Your Home In The West
- There Was An Old Woman
- Up and Running

== Radio ==
- Can't See For Looking (The Recall Man - Series Two) - BBC Radio 4
- The Bottle Factory Outing - BBC Radio 4
- The Painter and the Fisher Girl - BBC Radio 4
- Mr Bellings Diner (Football Stories for Girls) - BBC Radio 4
- Hook - BBC Radio 4
- Frozen Images - BBC Radio 3
- Eraser - BBC Radio 4
- Selling Horses - BBC Radio 4
- Deep Down - BBC Radio 4
- My Uncle Freddie - BBC Radio 4
- The Tyneside Mysteries - BBC Radio 4
- Blood Sugar - BBC Radio 4
- Gristle - BBC Radio 3
