= Underwater Love (Smoke City song) =

1995 single by Smoke City

- One of Jive Records UK editions

Single by Smoke City

from the album Flying Away
- Released: 1995; 31 March 1997
- Recorded: 1994
- Genre: Trip hop; acid jazz; bossa nova
- Label: Ritas; Jive
- Songwriters: Nina Miranda; Marc Brown
- Producers: Marc Brown; Nina Miranda; Mike Peden; Chris Franck

Smoke City singles chronology
"Underwater Love" (1995)	"Mr. Gorgeous (and Miss Curvaceous)" (1997)

Music video
- "Underwater Love" on YouTube

"Underwater Love" is a song by the English band Smoke City. First released in 1995 on Rita Records, the song did not receive recognition until its appearance in a Levi's commercial in 1997, upon which it was positively received critically. It was then re-released as a single by Jive Records and charted in 10 countries, peaking at number four on the UK Singles Chart. It later became the first track on their debut album Flying Away. Tim Macmillan and John Lynch directed the music video for "Underwater Love".

== Background ==
The Brazilian-inspired track is built upon a gentle, constant guitar strum, drums and samples, some of which are rainforest noises, others are from "Bahia Soul" by Luiz Bonfá and "Mother Popcorn" by James Brown. It was written by the band's singer Nina Miranda and programmer Marc Brown, two former school friends who were admirers of 1970s funk, Santana, and Gilberto Gil. Miranda and Brown were also credited as producers together with Mike Peden and band member Chris Franck.

Underwater Love was first recorded in 1994, and released in 1995 via Ritas Records, the song became a hit after being used in a commercial for Levi's jeans. Prior to this, it had been featured on the Fourth & Broadway/Island compilation "The Rebirth Of Cool Six". Lead singer Nina Miranda, who was living in Brazil at the time, was asked to return to London to discuss signing the project. Miranda and Smoke City were later based in London, but their interests were in Brazil. Miranda was proud that they had success in Portugal as that country was "in the middle of what we're about". Upon its re-release, on 31 March 1997, the song made the charts in 10 countries. Underwater Love was included on the band's debut album which was titled "Flying Away".

== Critical reception ==
Neil Kulkarni from Melody Maker named "Underwater Love" Single of the Week. Pan-European magazine Music & Media wrote, "This well-constructed alloy of dub, hip hop and jazz is sufficiently catchy in its own right, however, and would probably have become a hit even without the support of the TV ad." A reviewer from Music Week rated it five out of five, adding that "this hauntingly-sensuous melange of latin percussion, film noir vibes and bewitching vocals is begging to be the next Bond theme." New Musical Express commended its mixture of "dub and Brazilian touches and healthy helpings of sleaze", whilst The Pitch Online called the song "a perfect reprieve from the steel bars of winter into a humid rainforest of resonating vocals and music" and praised the vocals of Nina Miranda, noting that "even better than her exotic purring of the English hook would be when she transitions to a string of spoken Portuguese without using her full singing voice". Also Andy Beevers from the Record Mirror Dance Update gave it five out of five, describing it as a "sublime slice of sub-aqua sultriness". David Sinclair from The Times viewed it as an "exotic, hypnotic blend of Brazilian and hip hop beats". In addition, Tom Bromley, author of We Could Have Been the Wombles, described the song as having "a fantastic feel: the hypnotically plucked guitar, the funky drum loop, a judicious mix of Brazilian beats and sonar bleeps, wafts of organ and hints of Herbie Hancock [are] all topped off by Nina's mesmeric vocals".

== Chart performance ==
The song charted internationally, with its highest peak being in the UK at number four – becoming the 14th song to enter the UK Singles Chart on the back of being featured in a Levi's advertisement and the third debut act to chart this way – followed by number 18 in Norway. Further top forty placements came in Austria, with number 23, Switzerland and number 33 in the Wallonia region of Belgium. Other placings came in Australia, at number 41, the Flanders region of Belgium at number 42, number 55 in Germany, number 58 in Sweden and number 97 in the Netherlands.

== Music video ==
The accompanying music video for the song includes all three members of the band, and was directed by Tim Macmillan and John Lynch, with final production by Red Post in London.

== Track listings ==
- UK, European and Australian CD single
1. "Underwater Love" (radio edit) – 4:00
2. "Underwater Love" (Morales Underwater club mix) – 9:30
3. "Underwater Love" (Voyager remix) – 5:58
4. "Underwater Love" (album version) – 6:46
5. "Underwater Love" (Morales Salsoul mix) – 8:18
6. "Underwater Love" (Morales reprise) – 5:10
- UK cassette and French CD single
1. "Underwater Love" (radio edit) – 4:00
2. "Underwater Love" (Morales Underwater club mix) – 9:30
- US maxi-CD single
1. "Underwater Love" (radio edit) – 4:00
2. "Underwater Love" (Aphrodite mix) – 6:28
3. "Underwater Love" (Lionrock mix) – 5:40
4. "Underwater Love" (Morales Underwater club mix) – 9:30
5. "Underwater Love" (Voyager remix) – 5:58
6. "Underwater Love" (Morales Salsoul mix) – 8:18
7. "Underwater Love" (Morales reprise) – 5:10
8. "Underwater Love" (Lionrock instrumental) – 5:40

== Charts ==
=== Weekly charts ===
Chart (1997)	Peak position
Australia (ARIA)	41
Austria (Ö3 Austria Top 40)	23
Belgium (Ultratop 50 Flanders)	42
Belgium (Ultratop 50 Wallonia)	33
Europe (Eurochart Hot 100)	33
Germany (GfK)	55
Ireland (IRMA)	17
Israel (Israeli Singles Chart)	7
Netherlands (Single Top 100)	97
Norway (VG-lista)	18
Scottish Singles Sales (Official Charts)	4
Sweden (Sverigetopplistan)	58
Switzerland (Schweizer Hitparade)	32
UK Singles (Official Charts)	4
UK Dance (Official Charts)	17

=== Year-end charts ===
Chart (1997)	Position
UK Singles (OCC)	129

== Certifications ==
Region	Certification	Certified units/sales
United Kingdom (BPI)	Silver	60,000^{‡}
^{‡} Sales+streaming figures based on certification alone.
