= Da Lata =

British music group

Da Lata (meaning "from the tin" in Portuguese) are a British group formed in 1994 by Chris Franck and Patrick Forge. They combine Afro-Brazilian influences with other strands from the melting pot of their native London. Franck and Forge previously worked together with the Brighton-based group Batu before setting up Da Lata as a more studio based project. Franck is the main creative force as songwriter, producer and multi-instrumentalist, whereas Forge, better known as a DJ and broadcaster, is credited as co-producer. They made three albums for Palm Pictures: Songs from the Tin (2000), Serious (2003) and a collection of their remix work for other artists, Remixes, which featured their interpretations of songs by Femi Kuti, Luciano, Bebel Gilberto and Sly and Robbie, among others. After a hiatus of several years, the pair started work on a new album in 2011. It was scheduled for release in early 2013.

== Early work ==
Da Lata's first release was as Trio Da Lata for Brownswood Records in Japan. The song "Deep Water" featured former Batu vocalist Sharon Scott. However, it was their next release, a version of Edu Lobo's classic "Ponteio" that garnered attention, crossing over between house and jazz-dance audiences. "Ponteio" was supported particularly strongly in Japan and in New York by the Body&Soul DJs. Despite the success of this single, Da Lata was put on hold for a few years whilst Chris Franck wrote, produced and toured with Smoke City. In 1998, they recorded a song that had been initially demoed four years earlier; it was on the strength of the song "Pra Manha" that they were signed to Chris Blackwell's Palm Pictures.

== Albums ==
=== Songs from the Tin ===
Released in 2000, Da Lata's first album enlisted help from London-based Brazilian vocalist Liliana Chachian, who previously featured on "Ponteio", and percussionist Oli Savill. Strongly influenced by classic MPB from the late sixties and seventies, Songs from the Tin also bears the influence of dance music, comparing Da Lata with Nuyorican Soul. Barnes & Noble's online guide said:

"Impeccably produced, weighty tracks that unroll like an evening at a great dance club, where the segue is just as important as the track itself, and the transportive aspects of the music -- swelling strings, whistling synths, cool solos, and incessant percussion". -- Aim for Ecstasy

=== Serious ===
Parting company from Liliana Chachian and Oli Savill, Da Lata's second album took on other world music influences, particularly Afrobeat, to present a more diverse sound, though the Brazilian influence remained strong. Featuring guest performances from Baaba Maal, Jhelisa, Bembé Segué, and Brazilian accordionist Marcelo Jeneci, Serious "proves that Da Lata are one of the few capable of an intriguing, along-lasting dance/world fusion".

=== Fabiola ===
After leaving Palm Pictures, Da Lata released tracks in Japan ("Ronco da Cuíca") and in the UK ("This Is Not Your Job"), both of which were updated for release on their follow-up album Fabiola. A cover version of The Jam's "Going Underground", with vocals by Floetic Lara, was released as a single in December 2012. The album Fabiola was released in October 2013 on Agogo Records.
