= Cooking with Elvis =

Play by Lee Hall

Cooking with Elvis is a dark comedy by playwright Lee Hall which was performed in 1999 in Edinburgh.

The farce was adapted from a play written for the award-winning BBC Radio God's Country series and premiered in 1999 in Edinburgh. It was also performed at the Edinburgh Festival in 2000, where it was highly acclaimed. Shortly afterwards it transferred to the Whitehall Theatre in London's West End in a production starring the comedian Frank Skinner, Sharon Percy, Charlie Hardwick and Joe Caffrey.

According to Richard Paul Knowles, one of the most popular shows in Edinburgh in 1999 was "Lee Hall's anarchic Cooking with Elvis, performed beneath one or three crystal chandeliers which hung next to a disco ball at one end of the Ballroom, a lush old gilded space in some decay at the heart of the Assembly Rooms. The show was by turns camp, comic horrific, and in-your-face, a tragic farce about child abuse, wife abuse, sex, loss and cooking."

The comedy centres on Dad (Joe Caffrey), a famous impersonator of rock 'n' roll star Elvis Presley, who was paralyzed in a car crash and is now forced to spend the rest of his life in a wheelchair. Other characters include his anorexic, alcoholic wife Mam (Charlie Hardwick), their fourteen-year-old daughter Jill (Sharon Percy), and their young lover Stuart (Frank Skinner).

Climaxes of the play are surreal fantasy scenes in which Dad's hallucinatory Elvis dreams are bursting into popular Presley songs as a reminiscence of his one-time persona of an Elvis impersonator. At one time, Dad, already dressed in his Elvis costume, leaps from his wheelchair and launches into an Elvis ballad. At other times a wardrobe door will be opened for Elvis to leap out and into another song with Mam and Jill as backup singers. In another scene, Singing Elvis becomes Reverend Elvis who starts making bizarre speeches about philosophy, drugs and sodomites - references to Presley's consumption of drugs and, according to reviewer Rich See, the gay rumors that continue to swirl around Presley, namely, his "obsession with James Dean and his alleged affair with actor Nick Adams." The glittering costumes in the play remind the viewer of the costumes worn by the Las Vegas Elvis in the 1970s. For example, there are ornate belts with gold padlocks and many spangles.

Mam has an insatiable appetite for sex which can no longer be satisfied by her husband. Jill is primarily interested in cookery books. Mam is locked in a battle with her daughter, who disapproves of the fact that her mother has a very indiscreet sexual liaison with Stuart, a handsome young baker, in the marital home. Mam's sexual need is echoed in Jill’s appetite for food which leads to her being overweight. Brought home by Mam, Stuart soon figures in everyone's sex life, including the brain-damaged "Elvis" who seems to have at least one part of his anatomy functioning. After some trouble, the play has a deadly ending

Cooking with Elvis has been compared to the early black farces of Joe Orton.
