= Ministry of Sound Anthems =

2007 compilation album by various artists

Anthems 1991–2008

Compilation album by Various artists (mixed by Kev and Cass)
- Released: 19 November 2007
- Recorded: 1991–2007
- Genre: House, Eurodance, Electronica, Trance, Big beat
- Label: Ministry of Sound

Various artists (mixed by Kev and Cass) chronology
Anthems 1991–2008 (2007)	Chilled 1991–2008 (2008)

Anthems 1991–2008 is a compilation album released by Ministry of Sound in Australia and the UK and the first in a series. The three CD set features dance singles from the period of 1991–2007 (despite the "2008" in the title). A music tour for the album was conducted in February 2009.

== UK Series ==
Anthems 1991–2008 is the first in a series of albums released by the Ministry of Sound. The series is split into three mini-series, these are "Anthems", "Chilled" and "Ibiza". There is not an official name for the series, but is often called 'Anthems' after four albums in the series and the first mini-series.

Currently, there are eight different albums in the series. The artwork scheme follows the Fifteen Years release of 2006, which is sometimes seen as the pre-runner to Anthems 1991–2008. The Ibiza 1991–2009 album notably comes in a 3-CD digipack, rather than the larger fold-away digipacks (which are contained in slipcases) used for the other seven albums. The same album is overlooked when the series is being listed in the booklet for Anthems R&B. All copies of Chilled Acoustic feature a mistake in the artwork, where the top half of the Ministry of Sound logo used on the reverse side of the digipack; is upside-down.

2011 saw the year with the most releases in the series, with seven being released, four of these featuring 'Anthems' in the name. The last two Anthems albums of 2010, Anthems Disco and Anthems Electronic 80s, were released only a week between each other (8 November and 15 November respectively).

=== List of albums in the series ===
- Anthems 1991–2008 (2007)
- Chilled 1991–2008 (2008)
- Anthems II 1991–2009 (2008)
- Chilled II 1991–2009 (2009)
- Ibiza 1991–2009 (2009)
- One (2009)
- Anthems Electronic 80s (2009)
- Chilled Acoustic (2010)
- Anthems R&B (2010)
- Anthems Disco (2010)
- Anthems Electronic 80s 2 (2010)
- Anthems Hip-Hop (2011)
- Anthems Indie (2011)
- Chilled Afterhours (2011)
- 20 Years (2011)
- Anthems R&B II (2011)
- Anthems Alternative 80s (2011)
- Anthems Collection (2011)
- Anthems Hip-Hop 2 (2012)
- Big Beat Anthems (2012)
- Anthems 90s (2012)
- Anthems Electronic 80s 3 (2012)
- Anthems Hip-Hop 3 (2013)
- Anthems Trance (2013)
- Anthems Hip-Hop 4 (2014)
- Anthems 90s 2 (2014)
- Anthems House (2014)
- Anthems Drum & Bass (2015)
- Anthems Soul Classics (2016)
- Anthems Acoustic (2016)
- Anthems Electronic 90s (2019)

==== List of download exclusives in the series ====
- Chilled Sessions (2008)
- iDrum Minsistry of Sound Anthems (2008)—iPod game
- iDrum Trance Anthems (2008)—iPod game

== Australian Series ==
Like in the UK, Ministry of Sound Australia's Anthems series started with Anthems 1991–2008, but the series in Australia is considerably smaller and less popular compared to MoSA's Sessions and Annual series. Anthems 1991–2008 and Anthems Electronic 80's being the same version as what was released in the UK, however Anthems II in Australia did not include the 1991–2009 subtitle and focused more on Australian dance and dance tracks that were on the ARIA charts for overall and club songs. Rave Anthems 1990–1996 was released exclusively in Australia and focused on Rave, House and Hi-NRG dance subgenres.

=== List of albums in Australian Anthems series ===
- Anthems: 1991–2008 (2008)
- Rave Anthems: 1990-1996 (2009)
- Anthems II (2009)
- Anthems: Electronic 80's (2010)
- Anthems: 30 Years of Hip Hop (2011)

== Track listing ==
Disc 1

1. Show Me Love – Robin S
2. Passion – Gat Decor
3. Make The World Go Round – Sandy B
4. Nakasaki (I Need A Lover Tonight) – Ken Doh
5. Break Of Dawn – Rhythm On The Loose
6. Alex Party (Saturday Night Party) – Alex Party
7. Two Can Play That Game – Brown, Bobby (1)
8. Push The Feeling On – Nightcrawlers (1)
9. Where Love Lives – Limerick, Alison
10. Hideaway – De'Lacy
11. One Night In Heaven – M People
12. U Sure Do – Strike (3)
13. Keep Warm – Jinny
14. I Believe – Happy Clappers
15. I Luv U Baby – The Original
16. Key The Secret – Urban Cookie Collective
17. Don't You Want Me – Felix
18. Plastic Dreams – Jaydee (1)
19. Higher State Of Consciousness – Wink, Josh
20. Ebeneezer Goode – Shamen (1)
21. Everybody In The Place – Prodigy (1)

Disc 2

1. You Don't Know Me – Van Helden, Armand & Duane Harden
2. Trouble With Me – Black Legend
3. So In Love With You – Duke (3)
4. Bomb – Gonzalez, Kenny 'Dope' & The Bucketheads
5. Everybody Be Somebody – Ruffneck & Yavahn
6. Who Keeps Changing Your Mind – South Street Player
7. Spin Spin Sugar – Sneaker Pimps
8. RipGroove – Double 99
9. Dreaming – Ruff Driverz & Arrola
10. It's Not Over Yet – Grace (2)
11. Greece 2000 – Three Drives
12. Salt Water – Chicane (2)
13. God Is A DJ – Faithless
14. Born Slippy – Underworld (1)
15. Kernkraft 400 – Zombie Nation
16. Time to Burn – Storm (4)
17. Sandstorm -Darude
18. Castles In The Sky – Ian Van Dahl
19. Silence – Delerium & Sarah McLachlan
20. Out Of The Blue – System F
21. 9pm (Til I Come) – ATB

Disc 3

1. One More Time – Daft Punk
2. Needin' You - David Morales Presents: The Face
3. Get Get Down – Johnson, Paul (3)
4. Sing It Back – Moloko
5. Another Chance – Sanchez, Roger
6. Praise You – Fatboy Slim
7. Red Alert – Basement Jaxx
8. Intro – Braxe, Alan & Fred Falke
9. Touch Me – Da Silva, Rui & Cassandra
10. Lovestory – Layo & Bushwacka
11. Lazy – X-Press 2 & David Byrne
12. At Night – Shakedown
13. Love Generation – Bob Sinclar & Gary 'Nesta' Pine
14. It Just Won't Do – Tim Deluxe
15. American Dream – Jakatta
16. Rapture – iiO (1)
17. Put 'Em High – Stonebridge & Therese
18. Call On Me – Eric Prydz
19. Loneliness – Tomcraft
20. Satisfaction – Benassi, Benny & The Biz
21. Put Your Hands Up For Detroit – Fedde Le Grand
