= Car Stereo Wars =

Pop band from Melbourne, Australia

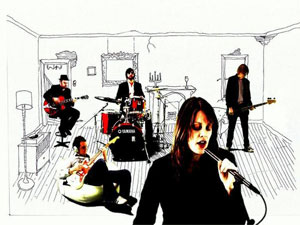

Background information
- Origin: Melbourne, Australia
- Genres: Pop, electronica, trip hop
- Years active: 2000 - present
- Labels: Independent (2004-Present); Ministry of Sound (Australia, 2003–2006)
- Members: Alyssa Doe; Jason White; Matt Gillman; Sean Ashbrooke; Graeme Luther
- Website: carstereowars.com

Car Stereo Wars are a pop band formed in Melbourne, Australia in 2000.

== History ==
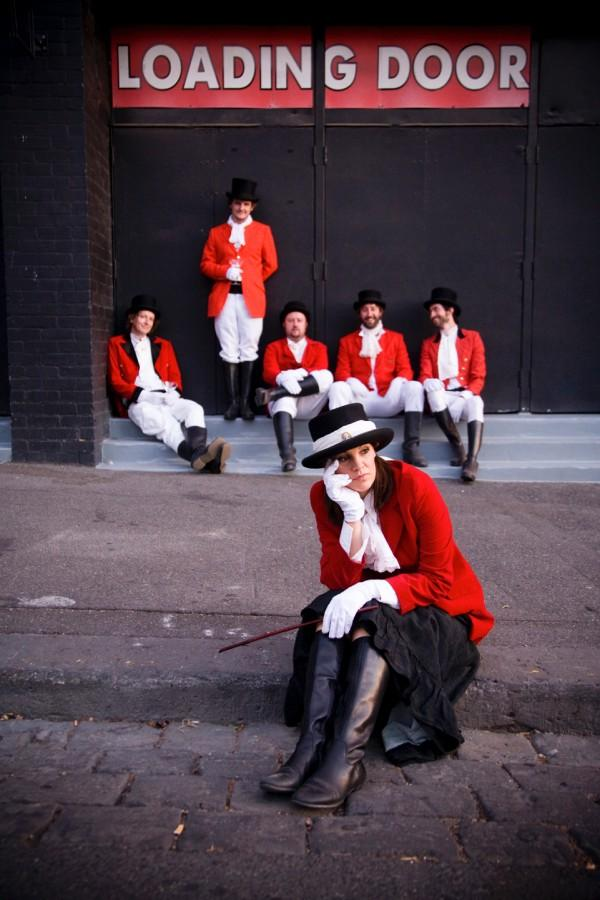
Car Stereo Wars - from foxhunt photo set

Car Stereo Wars were formed in Melbourne in 2000 by Jason White and Matt Gillman after meeting at a computer animation course. They were joined soon after by Alyssa Doe on vocals and went on to release their first EP "Project A." The song "Broken" was then picked up for Ministry of Sounds Chillout Sessions and subsequently signed to Ministry of Sound Australia and released "They Asked me to be in a Movie" EP in 2003. The single "Come to Nothing" was then added to the playlist of a subsequent Ministry of Sound chillout compilation.

The band released their debut album in 2008 "For Your Comfort and Safety" and has enjoyed recent commercial success with the track "Come to Nothing" being used in a Tic Tac television commercial in the United States and available as a free download from the Tic Tac USA website. The track has also been used in an advertisement for DELL Computers.

== Live Shows ==
It is rare to see the band play live however they have made several trips to the United States for music festivals. In 2001 Car Stereo Wars travelled to Austin, Texas to play at the annual SXSW festival, then in 2003 traveled again to the U.S to play at legendary CBGB's in New York as part of the CMJ Music Marathon The band has also played some shows in their hometown Melbourne, usually only to support an album or E.P launch.

== Members ==
The current members are:

- Alyssa Doe: 2002–present (vocals, keyboards, tuba)
- Jason White: 2000–present (bass, guitar, and vocals)
- Matt Gillman: 2000–present (guitar, bass, keyboards)
- Sean Ashbrooke: 2003–present (guitar)
- Graeme Luther: 2003–present (drums)
- David Meagher 2007–2011 (guitar/keyboards)

== Discography ==
=== Albums ===
- For your Comfort and Safety (2008)

=== Compilations ===
- Ministry of Sound - Chillout Sessions - Summer (2003)
- Ministry of Sound - Chillout Sessions - Volume 5 (2004)
- Brave New Day - Oxfam Tsunami Aid Compilation (2005)

=== EPs ===
- Project A (2000)
- They Asked Me to Be in a Movie (2003)
