= Chris Franck =

British musician

Chris Franck is a German-born English musician, songwriter, record producer, and remixer, best known for his involvement with the bands Batu, Da Lata, Smoke City, and Zeep. He is described as a "multi-instrumentalist".

== Biography ==
Franck was born in Germany, and has lived in the UK since the age of six. His father is German, his mother is Dutch.

== Career ==
Franck gained initial success in 1992 in the group Batu, featuring Oli Savill, Franc O'Shea and Tristan Banks, among others.

In 1997, the Smoke City single "Underwater Love" debuted on the UK Singles Chart after appearing as part of a Levi's ad campaign in the United Kingdom.

The band Zeep is a project created with Nina Miranda, a bandmate from Smoke City.

Franck's musical influences include samba, Bossa nova, the music of Africa, folk music, funk, and rock music.

Franck co-wrote and produced two albums for Chris Blackwell's "Palm Pictures" label with the band Da Lata. The first album was called Songs From the Tin, and the second was called Serious. He also released an album of remixes under the Da Lata name for Palm Pictures. He co-wrote and produced two albums with the band Smoke City for Jive Records: Flying Away and Heroes of Nature.

Franck collaborated on Ernest Ranglin's album Modern Answers to Old Problems alongside Tony Allen, Courtney Pine, and Denys Baptiste. The album was engineered by Jerry Boys and produced by Mark van den Berg and Trevor Wyatt.
