= Nina Miranda =

Brazilian singer and songwriter (born 1970)

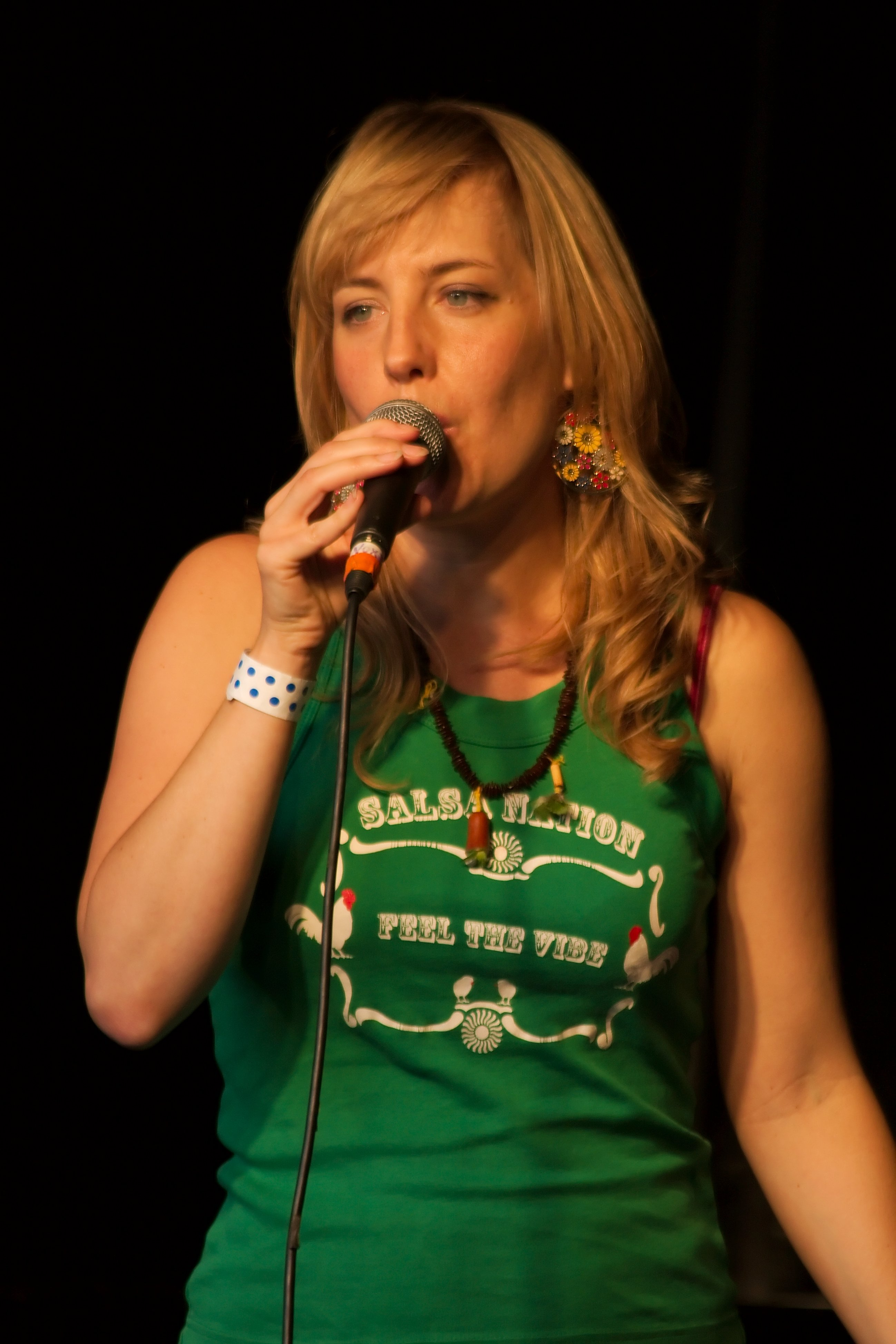
- Miranda performing at the Bossa Nova Festival in Bernie Spain Gardens at London's South Bank in July 2008
- Born: Brasília, DF, Brazil
- Occupations: Singer; songwriter
- Years active: 1994–present
- Children: 2
- Website: www.ninamiranda.com

Nina Miranda is a Brazilian singer and songwriter who was a member of English bands Smoke City, Shrift and Zeep.

== Life and career ==
Miranda was born in Brasília, Distrito Federal. Her mother is the English Liz Thompson-Miranda; Her father is the Brazilian artist Luiz Aquila, who is also a visual artist. The family subsequently lived in both England and France. Miranda said that she wanted to be an opera singer when she was younger, but later studied art instead.

Smoke City played major venues and festivals in the UK and Europe. Their first album, Flying Away, was released in 1997, followed in 2001 by Heroes of Nature. Some of Smoke City's songs, and other writing collaborations Miranda has been involved with, have appeared in films and advertising. In a podcast on the Myspace website of Zeep, the duo that she later formed with fellow Smoke City member, Chris Franck, it was revealed that Smoke City had decided to fold because of pressure exerted on the band by their record label. Zeep released an album in July 2007, eponymously named Zeep. In 2009, Zeep released a second album, People & Things.

Miranda has also worked with a variety of artists, performing on tracks for Da Lata, Nitin Sawhney, Basement Jaxx, Cirque du Soleil, Bebel Gilberto, Daniel Jobim, Antonio Chainho, Spiller, Faze Action, Jah Wobble, Les Gammas, Troubleman, Arkestra 1, Hajime Yoshizawa, Robert Miles and DAXUVA. Miranda joined musical forces with Dennis Wheatley in forming the group Shrift. The principal result of this collaboration was the 2006 release, Lost in a Moment.

Miranda and her partner from Smoke City and Zeep, Chris Franck, had two sons together. They separated in 2000.

In 2017, Nina Miranda released her first solo album "Freedom of Movement" on the label Six Degrees Records. She had learnt to record and mix at home and relished immortalising the sound of high-calibre musicians and free-spirited souls that gathered in her home studio and in studios in London, Rio and beyond.

In 2018, Miranda released an album, Le Jardin, with Portuguese producer Daxuva. "Hummingbird" was its first single.
