= Kinobe =

British music act

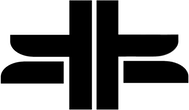

Background information
- Origin: Hammersmith, West London, England
- Genres: Electronica, trip hop, nu jazz, Chill-out, downtempo, ambient
- Labels: Sony Music Entertainment UK, Zomba, Jive, Something Good, New State Music, SGKL.
- Members: Julius Waters

Kinobe is a British electronic music group, founded in west London in 1998 by childhood friends Mark Blackburn and Julius Waters. Subsequent members have included Dave Pemberton and Chuck Norman.

Kinobe first came to prominence with their single "Slip Into Something More Comfortable" (sampling Engelbert Humperdinck's "From Here to Eternity") during the late 1990s/early 2000s boom for chilled electronic music, alongside Kruder & Dorfmeister, Zero 7, Groove Armada and The Thievery Corporation. The track featured on numerous TV, film and compilation soundtracks and was reissued in 2016 with new remixes featuring Psychemagik, Stephen Hague, Shibumi and Enginearz.

Kinobe followed up the success of "Slip Into Something More Comfortable" with a series of albums that featured continued use of sampling and live instruments, while also introducing guest vocalists and musicians.

In 2026, Kinobe release the hypnotic "Nothing Else Exists" as a teaser single to their new nine-track album "Open Your Mind" – a collection of introspective, brooding dreamscapes.

== Discography ==
=== Studio albums ===
Title	Album details
Soundphiles	Released: 2000; Label: Zomba
Versebridgechorus?	Released: 2001; Label: Jive/Pepper
Wide Open	Released: 2004; Label: Jive
Choose Your Own Adventure	Released: 2009
Firebird (EP)	May 12, 2017; Label: Something Good
Thought It Was You (EP)	July 14, 2017; Label: Something Good
Golden Age	August 31, 2018; Label: New State Music
Golden Dubs	October 18, 2019; Label: New State Music
Follow the Sun	September 17, 2020; Label: Kinobe
Full Circle	May 14, 2022; Label: Kinobe
Over the Horizon	August 4, 2023; Label: SGKL
Out of the Blue	August 9, 2024; Label: SGKL
Open Your Mind	June 5, 2026; Label: SGKL
