= Franc O'Shea =

Franc O'Shea is a bassist born in Swaziland. He has worked with artists including Steve Howe (Yes), Lisa Moorish, Mike Lindup (Level 42), Bah Samba, members of Jamiroquai and Beverley Martyn. His playing covers a variety of styles including jazz, Latin, rock, world music and flamenco. He released a solo album entitled Esprit, in 1999 and, for a 2006 album, Alkimia, hired players including Jorge Pardo, Rubem Dantas, and Juan Manuel Canizares, as well as Benjamin Sarfas, Philippe Barnes, Nan Mercader, Chema Vilchez, Serguei Sapricheff, etc. He currently teaches at the British and Irish Modern Music Institute and lives in the UK.
