= Dubtribe Sound System =

Electronic musical group from California

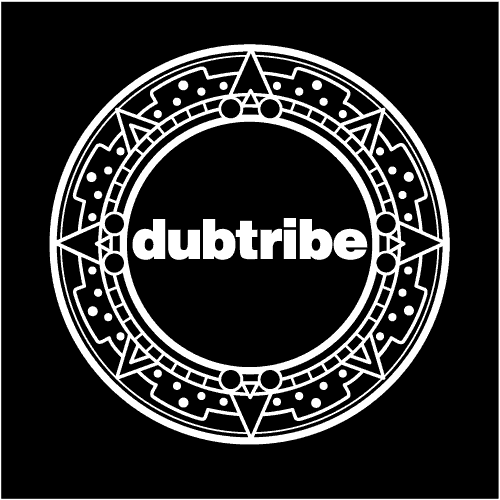
Dubtribe Sound System Logo

Dubtribe Sound System is a San Francisco-based electronic musical group that produced and performed live worldwide between 1991 and 2005.

Dubtribe consisted of singers Sunshine Jones and Moonbeam Jones but also included many sit-in and on-tour musicians over the years. Born in a rent party, Dubtribe Sound System distinguished itself as performers by performing live for many hours, rather than replaying their recordings from DAT tapes or portable computers, and touring without stopping, often bringing their own sound, lights, and traveling family with them. But unlike its few counterparts in North America, Dubtribe would depart from the warehouse movement and establish itself in the mid-1990s as a grass-roots tour de force, refusing help, press, or money from any outside interests.

== Origins ==
Sunshine Jones, an ex-punk rocker and Bay Area native, was taking in the still-emerging sounds of hip-hop. At club Townsend, DJ Doc Martin broke out some house music. "One night he just started playing Marshall Jefferson and Ten City, and it was a real shock," Sunshine says. "I left angry with Martin because he sold out on hip-hop".

After Sunshine spent a summer on the Spanish party isle of Ibiza in 1989, "it started to make sense. All shapes and sizes getting together to dance", he says. "I wanted to share that. It changed me forever."

Back in San Francisco, Sunshine had been leading an acid jazz band. When it needed a vocalist, he took on Moonbeam in 1990 ("I didn't want to meet anybody named Moonbeam," Sunshine says. "I had the shit beaten out of me for my name"). Inspired by Ibiza, he tried to transform his group into a live house-music act. Many of the band members bailed, leaving just Sunshine and Moonbeam to go it alone as Dubtribe. At first, it was a grind trying to get booked in a DJ-centric world, but the duo's DIY Come Unity events at the Bryant Street pad (the first event was a rent party) were a hit, and soon Dubtribe was making records.

== Break-up and reunion ==
Dubtribe Sound System performed what appeared to be its final show at Cielo in New York City on December 1, 2005.

The group reunited on September 5, 2009, to play at the Buzz Reunion 101 event at Ibiza Nightclub in Washington, DC.

Dubtribe has had several performances across the U.S. from 2010 to 2013. As of 2014, Dubtribe still performs a few times per year.

== Notable recordings ==
- After a few years of cassette tape, and bootleg notoriety Dubtribe released 1993's 12" single "Mother Earth." the single was frequently quoted as being a major influence in the origins of the Chemical Brothers, DJ Icey, and many other breakbeat producers of the 1990s. Reaching the bottom of the UK Dance charts, included on hundreds of dance compilations, and remains a commonly sampled record.
- Its 1996 EP Momentito, Por Favor was instrumental in broadening the latin house and deep house sound of the underground dance scene in the United States.
- In 1999, Dubtribe released its fifth album, Bryant Street, and while it undersold the expectations of Jive executives, the track “Equitoreal” was included on hundreds of dance compilations, and DJ mixes. The song rose up the UK Dance charts, while Dubtribe was struggling to be released from its six-album agreement with Jive parent BMG. After refusing to allow Wrigley's Gum to license the song for a UK television commercial, the band was summarily dropped.
- 2001's Do it Now', intended as the final Dubtribe Sound System recording, found itself in the hands of the UK Dance Music Guru Simon Dunmore of Defected Records Ltd. Dunmore and his staff created a worldwide phenomenon from the song, and gave it a five-year lifespan in turntable and charts all over the world. It remains by far Dubtribe's most popular and best-known recording.

== Notable events ==
- World Electronic Music Festival, Barrie, ON, Canada
- Family Affair, Akron, OH, USA
- The Big Chill, UK
- Sunrise Festival, Baltimore, MD, USA
- Alachua County Music Harvest
- Illegal Beach Party adjacent to the Winter Music Conference (Voted best of conference by MixMag)
- 1999 U.S. and Canada tour for the release of their new album Bryant Street. The tour featured a high-end audio and lighting system created by Lighting Designer Randy Grosclaude and Sound Designer Steve Tanruther to meet the needs of Dubtribe's beautiful and unique performances.
