= Smoke City =

English trip hop group

- Origin: London, England
- Genres: Electronic, trip hop
- Years active: 1994–2002
- Label: Jive Records
- Members: Nina Miranda; Marc Brown; Chris Franck

Smoke City was an English band that blended acid jazz and trip hop, borrowing from Brazilian styles such as samba and bossa nova and some lyrics have excerpts in Portuguese. They are best known for their single "Underwater Love", which was a major hit in 1997, after being used in a Levi's television advertisement, "Mermaids" (directed by Michel Gondry). In 1997, the band released their first album, Flying Away, which included several hits such as "Underwater Love", "Mr. Gorgeous (and Miss Curvaceous)" and "Águas de março (Joga Bossa Mix)". Smoke City's next album, Heroes of Nature, was released in 2001. An extended version of Heroes of Nature had three more tracks than the original, one of them being a cover version of John Lennon's "Imagine".

"Underwater Love" is also a track on the soundtrack for Thicker Than Water, a surf video.

In 1998, the band contributed "O Cara Lindo (Mr. Gorgeous)" to the AIDS benefit compilation album Onda Sonora: Red Hot + Lisbon, which was produced by the Red Hot Organization.

The group disbanded in 2002.

Slant listed their album Flying Away at No. 20 on their list of greatest trip-hop albums of all time.

== Members ==
- Nina Miranda (vocals, fx)
- Marc Brown (programming, turntables, keyboards, percussion, vocals, fx)
- Chris Franck (guitar, keyboards, percussion, bass, vocals)

== Discography ==
=== Studio albums ===
List of albums, with selected chart positions
Title	Album details	Peak chart positions
Title	Album details	AUS
Flying Away	Released: 1997; Label: Jive	123
Heroes of Nature	Released: 2001; Label: Cutting Edge	–

=== Singles ===
List of singles, with selected chart positions
Title	Year	Chart positions									
Title	Year	UK	AUS	AUT	BEL (FL)	BEL (WA)	GER	ITA	NOR	SWE	SWI
"Underwater Love"	1997	4	41	23	42	33	55	—	18	58	32
"Mr. Gorgeous (and Miss Curvaceous)"	1997	—	168	—	—	—	—	1	—	—	—
