= Groove Armada discography =

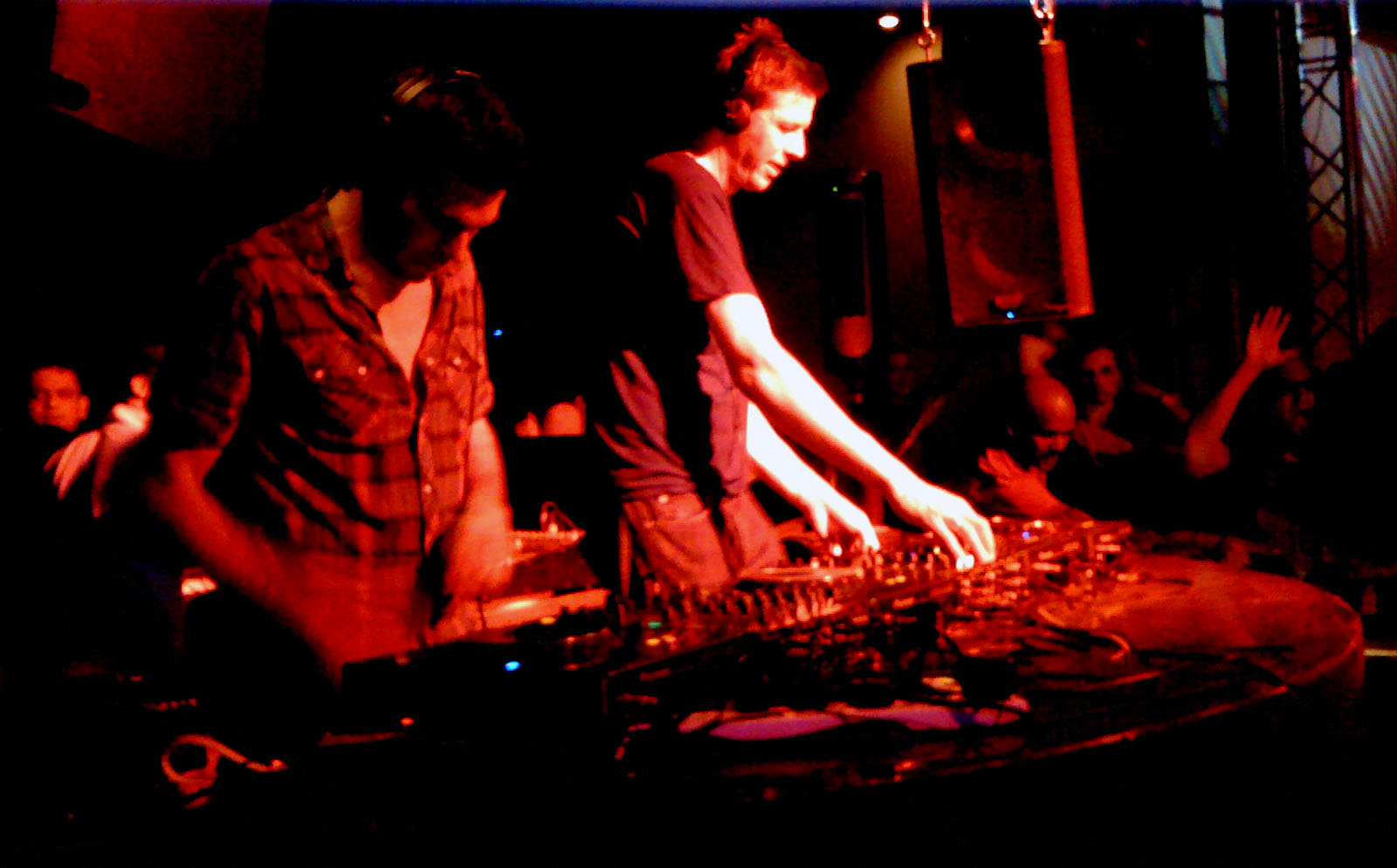
- Studio albums: 8
- Compilation albums: 13
- Singles: 24

The discography of Groove Armada, a British electronic music duo, consists of eight studio albums, thirteen compilation albums, and twenty-four singles.

== Albums ==
=== Studio albums ===
List of studio albums, with selected chart positions and certifications
| Title | Album details | Peak chart positions | | | | | | | | | | Certifications |
| Title | Album details | UK | AUS | AUT | BEL | FRA | IRE | NLD | NZ | SWI | US Dance | Certifications |
|---|---|---|---|---|---|---|---|---|---|---|---|---|
| Northern Star | Released: 9 March 1998; Label: Tummy Touch; Formats: CD, LP, digital download | 120 | — | — | — | — | — | — | — | — | — | |
| Vertigo | Released: 24 May 1999 (UK); Label: Jive Electro; Formats: CD, LP, MiniDisc, digital download | 23 | 39 | — | — | — | — | — | 38 | — | — | BPI: Platinum |
| Goodbye Country (Hello Nightclub) | Released: 10 September 2001; Label: Jive Electro; Formats: CD, LP, MiniDisc, digital download | 5 | 8 | 47 | 45 | 116 | 18 | 83 | 1 | — | 7 | BPI: Gold; ARIA: Platinum |
| Lovebox | Released: 18 November 2002; Label: Jive Electro; Formats: CD, LP, digital download | 41 | 15 | 69 | 46 | 123 | 65 | 100 | 21 | 70 | 3 | BPI: Silver; ARIA: Gold |
| Soundboy Rock | Released: 7 May 2007 (UK); Label: Columbia; Formats: CD, digital download | 10 | 30 | — | 63 | — | 28 | 77 | 19 | 66 | 10 | BPI: Silver |
| Black Light | Released: 29 January 2010; Label: Cooking Vinyl; Formats: CD, LP, digital download | 26 | 17 | — | 71 | — | 47 | — | 23 | — | 10 | |
| White Light | Released: 18 October 2010 (UK); Label: Cooking Vinyl; Formats: CD, digital download | 111 | — | — | — | — | — | — | — | — | — | |
| Little Black Book | Released: 10 July 2015 (UK digital); Label: Moda Black; Formats: CD, digital download | 43 | — | — | 66 | — | — | — | — | — | — | |
| Edge of the Horizon | Released: 2 October 2020; Label: BMG; Formats: CD, LP, digital download | 105 | — | — | — | — | — | — | — | — | — | |
"—" denotes a recording that did not chart or was not released in that territory.

=== Compilation albums ===
- Back to Mine (2000), BPI: Silver
- The Remixes (2000)
- AnotherLateNight: Groove Armada (2002)
- The Dirty House Session (2002)
- The Best of Groove Armada (2004), UK #6 Gold (UK), BPI: Gold
- Doin' It After Dark Vol 1 (2004)
- Doin' It After Dark Vol 2 (2004)
- Essential Summer Groove (2004)
- Groove Armada Presents... (2004)
- Greatest Hits (2007), BPI: Silver
- GA10: 10 Year Story (2007)
- LateNightTales (2008)
- Groove Armada Presents Lovebox Festivals & Fiestas (2008)
- Twenty One (2019)
- GA25 (2022)

== Extended plays ==
- Four Tune Cookie (1997)
- Lovebox EP (2002)
- Fireside Favourites (2003)
- EP (2009)
- Red Light Trax_EP.1 (2011)
- No Knock EP (2012)
- No Ejector Seat EP (2012)
- Pork Soda EP (2014)

== Singles ==
incomplete list

List of singles as lead artist, with selected chart positions and certifications, showing year released and album name
| Title | Year | Peak chart positions | | | | | | | | | | Certifications | Album |
| Title | Year | UK | AUS | BEL | CAN Dance | FIN | IRE | ITA | NLD | NZ | US Dance | Certifications | Album |
|---|---|---|---|---|---|---|---|---|---|---|---|---|---|
| "At the River" | 1997 | — | — | — | — | — | — | — | — | — | — | BPI: Gold; RMNZ: Gold | Non-album single |
| "Captain Sensual" | 1997 | — | — | — | — | — | — | — | — | — | — | | Northern Star |
| "M2 Many" | 1997 | — | — | — | — | — | — | — | — | — | — | | Northern Star |
| "Innocence Is Lost" (featuring Boy George) | 1999 | — | — | — | — | — | — | — | — | — | — | | Non-album single |
| "If Everybody Looked the Same" | 1999 | 25 | 89 | — | 11 | — | — | — | 94 | — | — | | Vertigo |
| "At the River" (Re-issue) | 1999 | 19 | — | — | — | — | — | — | 95 | — | — | | Vertigo |
| "I See You Baby" (featuring Gram'ma Funk) | 1999 | 17 | 11 | 53 | — | — | — | — | — | 20 | 12 | BPI: Silver; ARIA: Gold; RMNZ: Gold | Vertigo |
| "Superstylin'" | 2001 | 12 | 49 | 48 | — | — | 41 | 37 | 82 | 43 | 40 | BPI: Silver; RMNZ: 2× Platinum | Goodbye Country (Hello Nightclub) |
| "My Friend" | 2001 | 36 | 59 | 52 | — | — | — | 10 | 20 | 21 | — | BPI: Silver; RMNZ: Platinum | Goodbye Country (Hello Nightclub) |
| "Purple Haze" | 2002 | 36 | — | — | — | — | — | 38 | — | — | — | | Lovebox |
| "Final Shakedown" | 2002 | — | — | — | — | — | — | — | — | — | — | | Lovebox |
| "Easy" | 2003 | 31 | 68 | 62 | — | — | — | 44 | 76 | — | 5 | | Lovebox |
| "But I Feel Good" | 2003 | 50 | — | — | — | — | — | — | — | — | — | | Lovebox |
| "I See You Baby" (Re-issue) | 2004 | 11 | — | — | — | — | 16 | — | 92 | — | — | | The Best of Groove Armada |
| "Get Down" | 2007 | 9 | 33 | — | — | — | 48 | 22 | 89 | — | — | | Soundboy Rock |
| "Song 4 Mutya (Out of Control)" (featuring Mutya Buena) | 2007 | 8 | 24 | — | — | 12 | 26 | 49 | 96 | — | — | | Soundboy Rock |
| "Love Sweet Sound" | 2008 | — | — | — | — | — | — | — | — | — | 21 | | Soundboy Rock |
| "Feel the Same" (featuring Angie Stone) | 2008 | — | — | — | — | — | — | — | — | — | — | | Soundboy Rock |
| "I Won't Kneel" (featuring SaintSaviour) | 2010 | 190 | — | — | — | — | — | — | — | — | — | | Black Light |
| "Paper Romance" (featuring SaintSaviour and Fenech-Soler) | 2010 | 196 | — | — | — | — | — | — | — | — | — | | Black Light |
| "Look Me in the Eye Sister/Just for Tonight" (featuring Jess Larrabee) | 2010 | — | — | — | — | — | — | — | — | — | — | | Black Light |
| "History" (featuring Will Young) | 2010 | 117 | — | — | — | — | — | — | — | — | — | | Black Light |
| "Pull Up" | 2012 | — | — | — | — | — | — | — | — | — | — | | Non-album single |
| "Alright" | 2015 | — | — | — | — | — | — | — | — | — | — | | Little Black Book |
| "Get Out on the Dancefloor" (featuring Nick Littlemore) | 2020 | — | — | — | — | — | — | — | — | — | — | | Edge of the Horizon |
| "Lover 4 Now" (featuring Todd Edwards) | 2020 | — | — | — | — | — | — | — | — | — | — | | Edge of the Horizon |
