= Goodbye Country (Hello Nightclub) =

Studio album by Groove Armada
- Released: 10 September 2001
- Recorded: 2000–2001
- Genre: Electronica; trip hop; post-disco; house
- Length: 73:53
- Label: Jive Electro
- Producer: Andy Cato; Tom Findlay

Groove Armada chronology
The Remixes (2000)	Goodbye Country (Hello Nightclub) (2001)	Lovebox (2002)

Singles from Goodbye Country (Hello Nightclub)
- 1. "Superstylin'" Released: 13 August 2001; 2. "My Friend" Released: 5 November 2001

Professional ratings
Aggregate scores
Source	Rating
Metacritic	71/100
Review scores
Source	Rating
AllMusic	4/5 stars
Alternative Press	4/5 stars
BBC Music	favourable
Blender	2/5 stars
Dotmusic	4.5/5 stars
LA Weekly	3/5 stars
Mojo	4/5 stars
Q	2/5 stars
Spin	4/5 stars
URB	2.5/5 stars

Goodbye Country (Hello Nightclub) is the third studio album by the English electronica duo Groove Armada. It was released on 10 September 2001 on the Jive Electro record label. The title of the album was meant to differentiate it from the band's previous album, Vertigo, as being more upbeat and less chill-out.

The album features several guest vocalists, including Jeru the Damaja in "Suntoucher", MC M.A.D. in "Superstylin'", Tim Hutton in "Drifted", "Tuning In" and "Join Hands", Richie Havens in "Little by Little" and "Healing", Celetia Martin in "My Friend", and Kriminul in "Raisin' the Stakes". The Urban Soul Orchestra appears in "Edge Hill". The chorus from "Bam Bam" by Sister Nancy is sampled in "Fogma".

The track "Likwid" is a bonus track available only in the enhanced edition. A limited edition of the album was released with a bonus CD titled Socks, Cigarettes and Shipwrecks.

== Track listing ==
Goodbye Country (Hello Nightclub) track listing
No.	Title	Writer(s)	Length
1.	"Suntoucher"	Andy Cato, Tom Findlay, Jeru the Damaja, Jonathan White, Keeling Lee, Kenneth Gamble, Roland Chambers, Thom Bell	6:31
2.	"Superstylin'"	Cato, Findlay, White, Lee, Mike Daniels	6:00
3.	"Drifted"	Cato, Findlay, Andy Treacey, Patrick Dawes, Tim Hutton	4:54
4.	"Little by Little"	Cato, Findlay, White, Lee, Richie Havens	5:30
5.	"Fogma"	Cato, Findlay, Lee, Winston Riley	6:53
6.	"My Friend"	Cato, Findlay, Bill Curtis, Glen McKinney, Keith Crouch, Richard Cornwell	5:00
7.	"Lazy Moon"	Cato, Findlay, White, Lee, Dawes	6:33
8.	"Raisin' the Stakes"	Cato, Findlay, White, Delano Ogbourne	5:33
9.	"Healing"	Cato, Findlay, Havens	5:52
10.	"Edge Hill"	Cato, Findlay, White, Lee, Dan Hewson	7:00
11.	"Tuning In" (Dub Mix)	Cato, Findlay, Hutton	4:41
12.	"Join Hands"	Cato, Findlay, White, Treacey, Hutton	4:00
13.	"Likwid"	Cato, Findlay	5:21

Socks, Cigarettes and Shipwrecks

No.	Title	Length
1.	"Superstylin'" (G.A. Discotek Mix)	5:45
2.	"Moira's Theme"	3:52
3.	"Mali"	6:30
4.	"Lazy Moon" (live version)	6:38
5.	"Rap" (G.A. Alternative Mix)	4:12
6.	"Your Song" (Tim 'Love' Lee's Semi-Bearded Remix)	7:36
7.	"A Private Interlude" (Kinobe Remix)	5:40
8.	"Old Father Rhyme"	4:17
9.	"My Friend" (Dorfmeister vs. Madrid De Los Austrias Dub)	6:26

== Charts ==
=== Weekly charts ===
Weekly chart performance for Goodbye Country (Hello Nightclub)
Chart (2001–2002)	Peak position
Australian Albums (ARIA)	8
Austrian Albums (Ö3 Austria)	47
Belgian Albums (Ultratop Flanders)	45
Dutch Albums (Album Top 100)	83
French Albums (SNEP)	116
German Albums (Offizielle Top 100)	89
New Zealand Albums (RMNZ)	1
Norwegian Albums (VG-lista)	40
Scottish Albums (Official Charts)	6
UK Albums (Official Charts)	5
UK Dance Albums (Official Charts)	35
UK Independent Albums (Official Charts)	1
US Top Dance Albums (Billboard)	7

=== Year-end charts ===
Year-end chart performance for Goodbye Country (Hello Nightclub)
Chart (2001)	Position
UK Albums (OCC)	143
Chart (2002)	Position
Australian Albums (ARIA)	49

== Certifications ==
Certifications for Goodbye Country (Hello Nightclub)
Region	Certification	Certified units/sales
Australia (ARIA)	Platinum	70,000^{^}
New Zealand (RMNZ)	Platinum	15,000^{^}
United Kingdom (BPI)	Gold	100,000^{^}
^{^} Shipments figures based on certification alone.
