= The Best of Groove Armada =

The Best Of

Greatest hits album by Groove Armada
- Released: 8 November 2004
- Genre: Electronic; house; trip hop; big beat

Groove Armada chronology
Lovebox (2002)	The Best Of (2004)	Soundboy Rock (2007)

Professional ratings
Review scores
Source	Rating
AllMusic	4/5 stars

The Best Of is the first greatest hits album by English electronic music duo Groove Armada. It was released on 8 November 2004.

== Track listing ==
No.	Title	Length
1.	"Superstylin'"	6:02
2.	"If Everybody Looked the Same"	3:39
3.	"I See You Baby" (Fatboy Slim Mix)	4:05
4.	"At the River"	6:33
5.	"My Friend"	5:01
6.	"Take Me Home" (not on all editions)	3:45
7.	"Purple Haze"	4:03
8.	"Madder" (not on all editions)	5:21
9.	"Chicago"	7:22
10.	"Easy"	5:52
11.	"Think Twice"	6:00
12.	"Inside My Mind (Blue Skies)"	7:58
13.	"Little by Little"	5:30
14.	"But I Feel Good"	5:19

== Charts ==
=== Weekly charts ===
Chart (2004)	Peak position
Australian Albums (ARIA)	26
Belgian Albums (Ultratop Flanders)	45
New Zealand Albums (RMNZ)	17
Scottish Albums (OCC)	7
UK Albums (OCC)	6

=== Year-end charts ===
Chart (2004)	Position
UK Albums (OCC)	116

== Certifications ==
Region	Certification	Certified units/sales
United Kingdom (BPI)	Gold	100,000^{^}
^{^} Shipments figures based on certification alone.
