= Brixton Academy =

Music venue in London, England

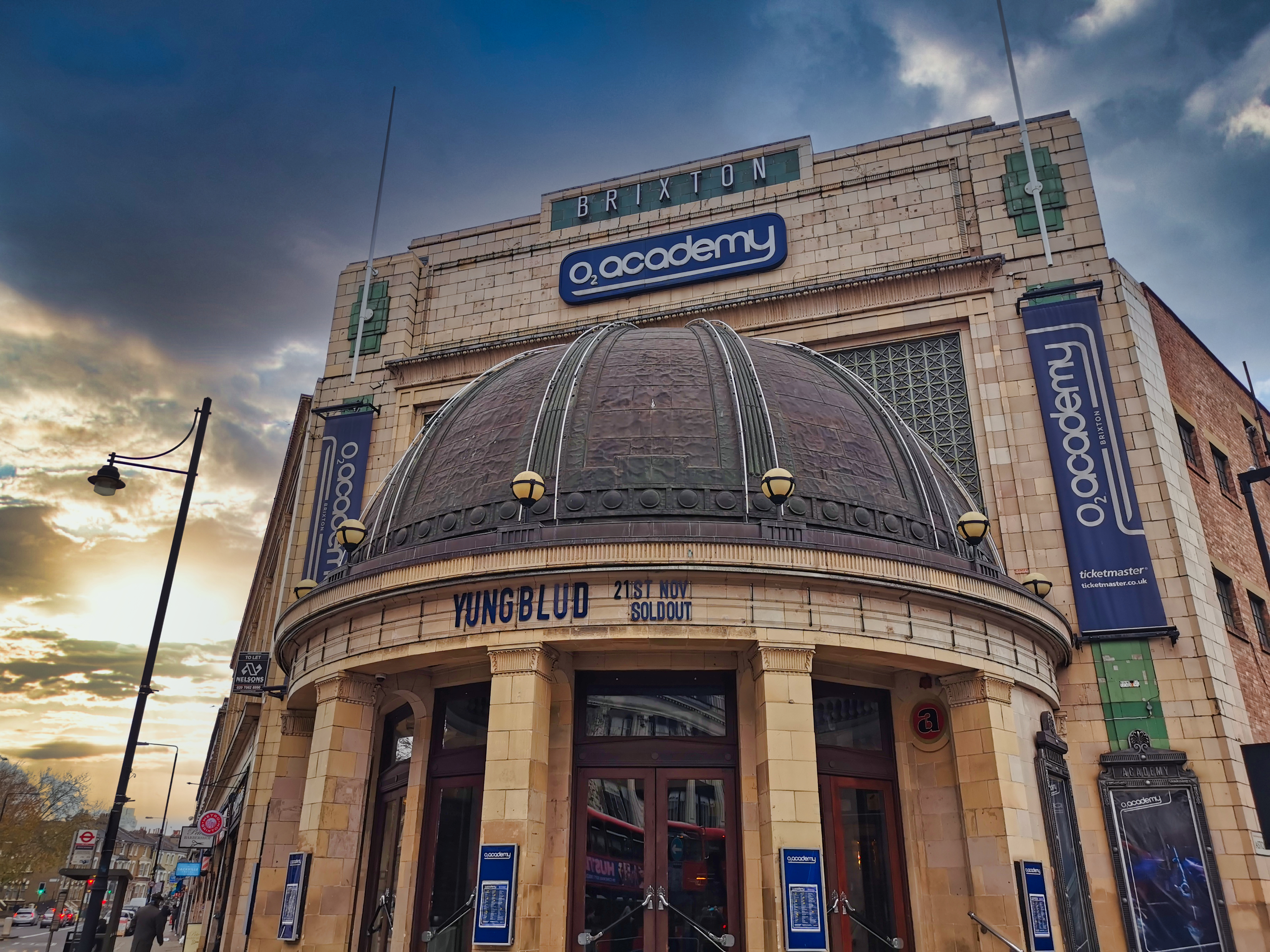
- Exterior of venue (in 2019)
- Interactive map of Brixton Academy
- Former names: Astoria Variety Cinema (1929–39); Odeon Astoria (1939–72); Sundown Centre (1972); Fair Deal (1982); Brixton Academy (1983–2004); Carling Academy (2004–09)
- Address: 211 Stockwell Road; London, UK
- Coordinates: 51.465107°N 0.114922°W
- Owner: Academy Music Group
- Capacity: 4,921 Detailed capacity: General admission: 4,300; Reserved: 3,820; Theatre: 2,315
- Public transit: Brixton; Brixton

Construction
- Opened: 19 August 1929
- Renovated: 1983; 2006
- Closed: 29 July 1972; January 1973; April 1982; December 2022
- Reopened: September 1972; 12 March 1982; 7 October 1983; 19 April 2024
- Cost: £250,000 (£18.5 million in 2024 pounds)
- Architects: Thomas Somerford; Edward Albert Stone

Website
- Official website

O2 Academy Brixton (originally known as the Astoria Variety Cinema, previously known as Carling Academy Brixton, or Brixton Academy, is a mid-sized concert venue located in South London, in the Lambeth district of Brixton.

Opening in 1929 as a cinema, the venue was converted into a discotheque in 1972, then reborn as a concert hall in 1983. It is owned by the Academy Music Group (AMG), and has become one of London's leading music venues, hosting over 50 live albums, and winning the NME Best Venue 12 times since 1994. It has been home to several notable performances, including The Smiths' last gig (December 1986), Leftfield's June 1996 concert which set a decibel record for a live gig at 137db, and Madonna's gig in 2000, which was watched by an online audience of 9 million.

In December 2022, two people died and others were seriously injured following a crowd crush at the door. As a result the venue was closed, with reopening subject to meeting council licensing conditions. It reopened on 19 April 2024.

== History ==
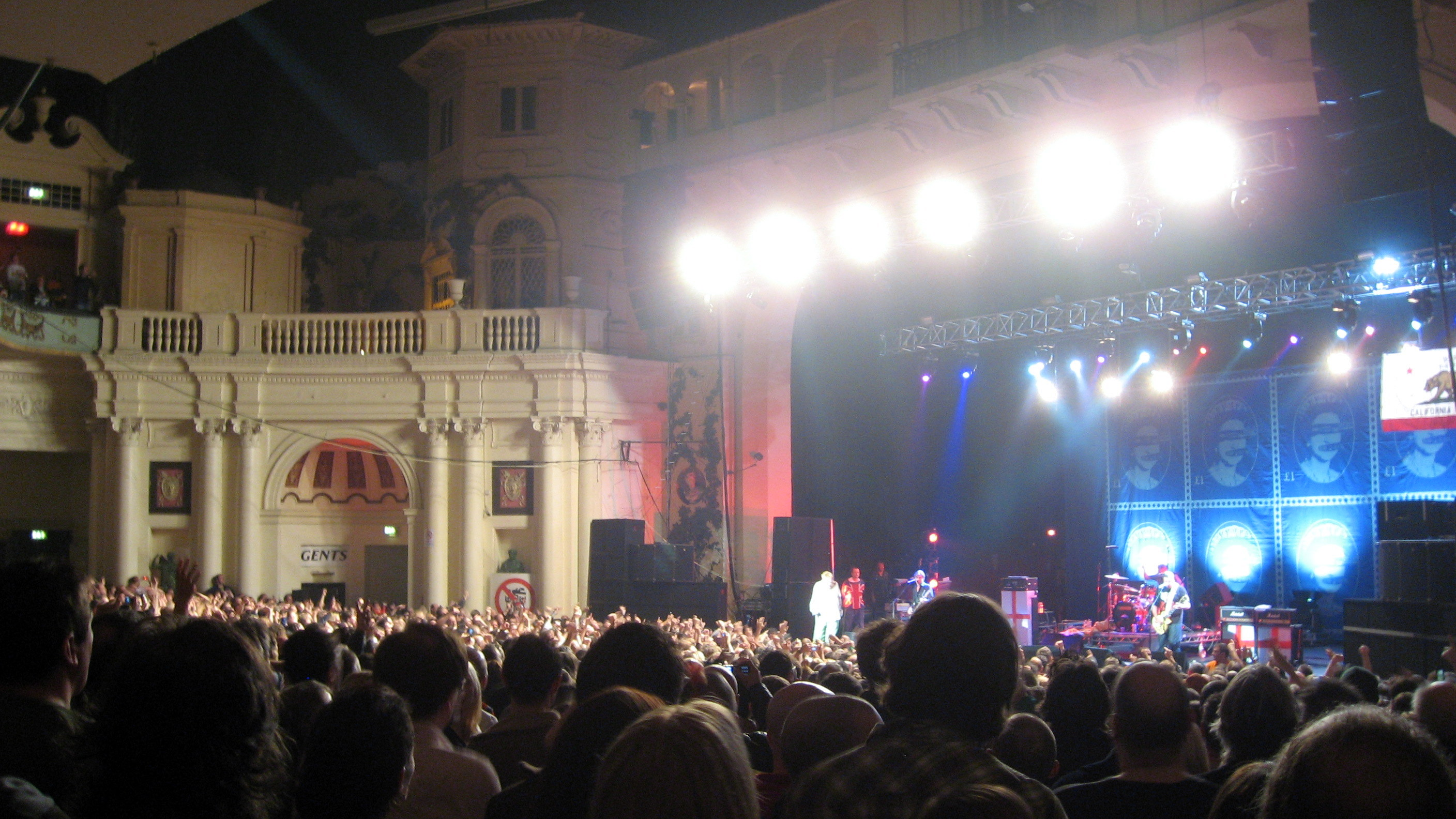
Part of the Italian Renaissance interior of the auditorium

The venue started as a cinema and theatre in 1929 on the site of a private garden in Stockwell Road. Designed by the architects Thomas Somerford and E. A. Stone, it was built at a cost of £250,000 as an "Astoria" theatre. The opening show was the Al Jolson film The Singing Fool, followed by a variety act, including Heddle Nash and Derek Oldham which was broadcast by the BBC. It had nearly 3000 seats, although the publicity for the theatre reported this as 4500. The theatre eventually closed its doors as a cinema on 29 July 1972. It was then converted into a discotheque in September 1972, known as the "Sundown Centre". The club was not a success and closed down some four months later. In May 1974 planning permission was sought to demolish the Grade II listed building and replace it with a motor showroom and petrol station. However, the redevelopment scheme was scrapped. The building was kept heated after it closed, and was used as an equipment store by the Rank Organisation.

In 1981, the venue was remodelled by Sean Treacy, who later ran the entire site services, was re-opened as a rock venue called "Fair Deal" with a concert by UB40 and an interior restoration. The Clash played the venue in 1982 on their Casbah Club tour (30 July) but the venue closed later that year due to debt. In 1983, Simon Parkes bought the venue for £1, and re-opened it as the Brixton Academy. The academy's success steadily grew throughout the 1980s with numerous reggae productions and it was hired out to major rock and pop acts such as The Rolling Stones, Eric Clapton, Dire Straits and the Police for rehearsal. The venue was also used for video shoots for Wham! (Wake Me Up Before You Go-Go) and Culture Club. Parkes would go on to write a book about his experience of running the venue, Live At The Brixton Academy: A Riotous Life in the Music Business, which was published in 2014.

In 1995, Parkes sold the theatre to Break for the Border. Under its new ownership (McKenzie Group), reinvestment started immediately, with a complete £500,000 refurbishment of the Art Deco building frontage to its original grandeur, additional facilities both front of house and backstage and a capacity increase to just under 5,000. The venue is currently run by the Academy Music Group after a rebranding in August 2004 and hosts a range of live acts and club nights. With the sale, the venue's title was changed to Carling Academy Brixton. In 2008, naming rights were purchased for £25.5 million by the O2 brand, owned by the Spanish telecommunications company Telefónica.

Being one of the biggest non-arena music venues in London, the academy has been used by many successful acts, such as Madonna, Wham!, and David Bowie. It has also been voted venue of the year 12 times since 1994 in the annual NME Awards. In addition the venue has won the Music Week Award for Venue of the Year several times including 2009.

=== 2022 Asake concert crush ===
A crowd crush outside a performance by Asake on 15 December 2022 seriously injured four people, two of whom died in the following days. The Guardian cast doubt on early reports that people were trying to force their way in without a ticket. The newspaper also questioned the management of the building and its entrances. As a result of the crowd crush, Lambeth councillors met in the early hours of 22 December 2022 and decided to suspend the academy's operating licence following the "severity of events" and "risks to public safety" from "a lack of crowd control at the front doors". The licence was suspended until a full hearing on 16 January 2023, when it was suspended for a further three months.

The BBC reported that security staff were said to accept bribes to allow people in without a ticket. In April 2023 the Metropolitan Police stated that they had no confidence in the holder of the venue's licence and that they were applying for the licence to be revoked. In September 2023, the police stated that they were not opposed to the venue reopening, but simply opposed to AMG operating it.

On 15 September 2023 Lambeth Council announced that the venue was permitted to re-open after the incident, providing they meet new licensing conditions including strengthened doors, a new security contractor and additional safety procedures. A full list of the conditions is published online by Lambeth Council.

The venue reopened on 19 April 2024.

=== 2026 Incident at Sombr concert ===
The venue came under renewed scrutiny in March 2026, when Sombr interrupted a live show to alert security staff of a concert attendee who had fainted, stating: "This is the most poorly managed venue I've ever performed at in my life", adding "You guys need to pay attention - it's insane. Safety comes first." The BBC reported that, according to eyewitness accounts, the concert had already been interrupted once earlier when another attendee had passed out. Witnesses also told the BBC that the venue appeared "unprepared", and was subject to high temperatures and a lack of air conditioning.

== Notable performances ==
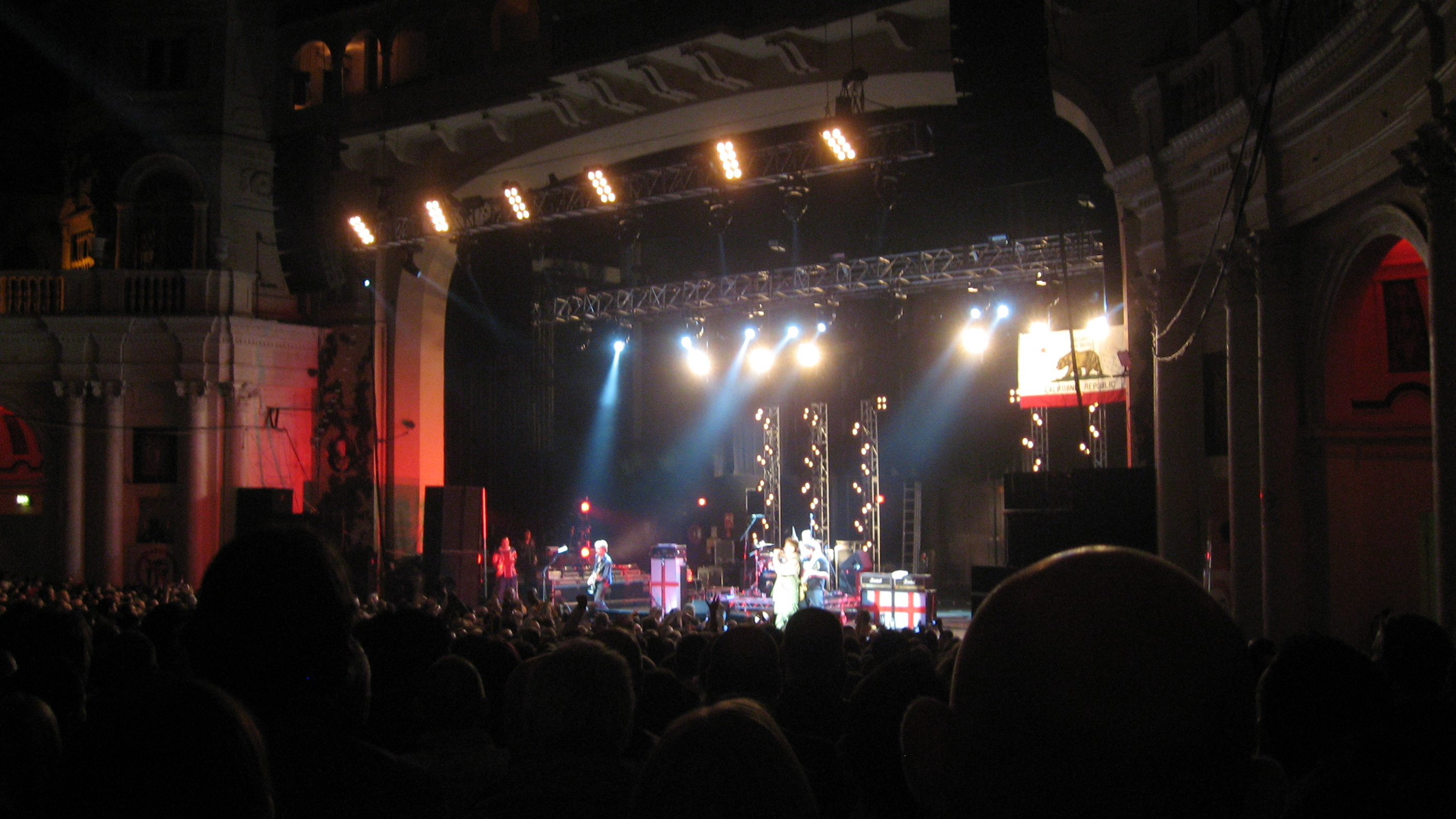
The decorative proscenium arch, framing the stage, with a concert in progress (Sex Pistols, 2007)

The Smiths played their last gig here in December 1986 which was an Anti-Apartheid benefit scheduled for the Royal Albert Hall but rearranged to the Brixton Academy due to Johnny Marr being involved in a car accident.

The Ramones played their final European show at the venue on February 3, 1996, before touring for the last time in South and North America.

Leftfield set the world's decibel record for a live concert in 1996 when they reached 137db. They were summarily banned from using the same sound system at the venue after the high bass levels started disintegrating the ceiling, resulting in showers of dust and plaster. They returned in 2000 using a different sound system.

Madonna played a special concert at the venue in 2000, to promote the release of her album, Music. The concert was broadcast live online and was watched by a record-breaking audience of 9 million.

Queen + Paul Rodgers played their first UK show at the venue on 28 March 2005.

Artists such as The Clash, Debbie Harry, The Prodigy, Arcade Fire, Nine Inch Nails and Bob Dylan have all played five consecutive nights at the venue. In 2002, Iron Maiden played three consecutive nights as a part of charity event "Clive Aid 2002". The band set the record for merchandise and ticket sales. The Mighty Boosh broke this record in 2008, with their second live show Boosh Live, playing seven consecutive nights. The xx equalled their record in March 2017, playing seven consecutive nights in support of third record I See You, becoming the first music act to reach that number. LCD Soundsystem also did eight shows in Brixton Academy over two four-day periods in June 2025 between June 12–15 and June 19-22.

On 23 November 2012, Feeder, played what would turn out to be their last show for four years, with initial speculation in the weeks leading up to the tour that it would be their last ever as a band. It would however be the last appearance drummer Damon Wilson would make with the band before his retirement from the industry in 2016.

== Albums recorded at Brixton ==
- Space Ritual, a 1972 live album by Hawkwind, recorded in 1972 at Brixton Sundown and Liverpool Stadium.
- Live at the Academy, Brixton, an album by Gregory Isaacs, recorded in May 1984.
- Pete Townshend recorded Deep End Live! at Brixton Academy on 1/2 November 1985.
- Academy, a 1989 VHS video by New Order was recorded live at the Brixton Academy on 4 April 1987 as part of the International AIDS Day fund-raising season
- See You Up There, a 1989 live album by Stiff Little Fingers, recorded 17 March 1988.
- A New Decade: Live From Brixton Academy, a 1990 live album by Soul II Soul, was recorded in the summer of 1990.
- You Fat Bastards: Live at the Brixton Academy, a 1991 live album by Faith No More, recorded in 1990.
- Weird's Bar & Grill, a 1993 live album from the band Pop Will Eat Itself, recorded in 1992.
- Live at the Brixton Academy, a 1994 live album by The Brian May Band.
- Hole recorded their 1995 MTV Unplugged sessions there.
- Live at Brixton Academy, a 1999 live album by Atari Teenage Riot.
- Live at the Brixton Academy, a live album released by Sizzla on 29 August 2000
- David Gray recorded his concert on 16 December 2000 as the album Live at Brixton Academy December 2000.
- Motörhead recorded their 25th Anniversary concert on 20 October 2000 at Brixton Academy entitled 25 & Alive Boneshaker, released as DVD music video in 2001 and as an audio album later in 2003 under the Live at Brixton Academy title, the latter featuring the façade of Carling Academy Brixton on the cover.
- Conflict Turning Rebellion into Money. Recorded 18 April 1987 during The Gathering of the 5000.
- Under a Pale Grey Sky, live album by Sepultura released in 2002, but recorded in 1996. Last concert featuring founding member and vocalist Max Cavalera, that left the band shortly after the show, following an argument in the backstage.
- Machine Head recorded their live CD Hellalive at the Brixton Academy on 8 December 2001. This CD was released on 11 March 2003.
- Scarred: Live at Brixton Academy, a 2003 live album by Gary Numan, recorded in 2001.
- Live at Brixton Academy, a 2003 live DVD by the Inspiral Carpets.
- Live in London, a 2003 live album by Judas Priest, recorded in 2001.
- A live album was released immediately after all four Pixies 2004 concerts.
- Franz Ferdinand recorded part of their self-titled live DVD at Brixton Academy in 2004.
- The Death in Vegas album Satan's Circus was released as a limited edition double pack including a live CD recorded at Brixton Academy.
- Rumble in Brixton, a 2004 live album and DVD by Stray Cats.
- Live at Brixton Academy, a 2004 live album and DVD by Dido.
- Good Charlotte Live at Brixton Academy, a 2004 DVD by Good Charlotte
- Live at Brixton Academy, a Limited Edition DVD recorded in 2004 for Groove Armada's album Lovebox, released for their Best Of album.
- Part of Rammstein's DVD Völkerball was recorded at the venue between 3 and 5 February 2005.
- Moby recorded his concert on 19 May 2005 and a double CD of the recording was available to buy at the venue after the show.
- Over the Years and Through the Woods, a live CD and DVD by the Queens of the Stone Age on 22 August 2005
- The Poison: Live At Brixton, a 2006 live DVD by Bullet For My Valentine
- Damian Marley recorded the album Damian Marley, Live at the Brixton Academy in 2006
- Live at Brixton Academy London, UK 11/13/07, a Limited Edition CD recorded by Concert Live for Alexisonfire, and distributed after the show
- Live in the UK 2008 at Brixton Academy 1 February 2008, a Limited Edition CD recorded by Concert Live for Paramore, and distributed immediately after the show
- Edgy In Brixton, a 2007 live DVD by The Fratellis
- Live in the UK at Brixton Academy 3 May 2008, a Limited Edition CD recorded by Concert Live for The Wombats, and distributed after the show
- Live from Brixton Academy, a live recording from the band Kasabian, available only from some digital download services and encumbered with DRM. It was recorded at Brixton Academy on 15 December 2004. This was the band's final show of their momentous breakthrough year, and band member Sergio Pizzorno's birthday.
- There'll Always Be an England, a live DVD and documentary recorded in 2007 for Sex Pistols.
- Jimmy Eat World recorded their concert on 18 February 2008 and a double CD of the recording was available to buy at the venue after the show and also online. The show was a sell-out despite not having a major hit in the UK.
- Pendulum recorded their live DVD in Brixton on 4 December 2008.
- Dave Matthews Band released a DVD of a 26 June 2009 concert entitled Across the Pond as a part of a box-set Europe 2009 on 22 December 2009.
- Jamie T recorded his concert on 5 February 2010, which was sold at the venue the next day.
- Chase and Status recorded live album Live at Brixton Academy in 2012
- Faithless recorded their "Passing The Baton" album live at Brixton Academy in 2012.
- Two Door Cinema Club recorded a live album as part of a two-disc deluxe set for the 2012 album Beacon.
- Asking Alexandria recorded their show at Brixton Academy in January 2013, it was released in December 2014 in DVD format on Live From Brixton And Beyond.
- Carter USM recorded their show at Brixton Academy on 14 November 2009. This recording was released as part of the two disc ' The Drum Machine Years' release which also included a recording of the previous night's gig at London (HMV) Forum.
- Carter USM "The Final Comedown" Live CD & DVD was recorded in November 2014. Said to be as the best live film & audio recording of the band that has ever been made & a fitting end to the band's live career.
- Babymetal recorded their 8 November 2014 performance at the Brixton Academy, releasing the performance in 2015 under the title Live in London: Babymetal World Tour 2014.
- Of Mice & Men recorded their show at Brixton Academy in March 2015. Made a live DVD called, Live at Brixton Released on 27 May 2016.
- New Order recorded their show at Brixton Academy in November 2015. Made a live album called, 'NOMC15' Released on 26 May 2017.
- 5 Seconds of Summer recorded their show at Brixton Academy on 29 October 2018. They made a live album called, Meet You There Tour Live which was released 21 December 2018.
- Public Service Broadcasting recorded their album: "Live at Brixton" at Brixton in 2015.
- Mastodon recorded their Brixton show on 11 February 2012, releasing the Live at Brixton album of the recording in 2014.
- Gojira recorded their show at Brixton Academy on 24 March 2013, later releasing it on 11 March 2014 as Les Enfants Sauvages.
- Deaf Havana recorded their show at Brixton Academy on 7 December 2018. They made a live album called, Deaf Havana Live at Brixton Academy'which was released in 2019.
- Bombay Bicycle Club recorded their show at Brixton Academy in 2019, playing their debut album in full. They released the recording in January 2021.

== Videos recorded at Brixton ==
- The Alarm - Blaze of Glory. Around half of the show was released on VHS in 1991. This was the concert that Mike Peters announced his departure at, therefore this was the last full show with the original lineup.
- The ITV Panto Cinderella, which was not actually released on DVD or VHS.
- Tenacious D has most of their performance from 3 November 2002 at the Brixton Academy on the second disc of their DVD, The Complete Master Works.
- Iron Maiden recorded three videos here: "Women in Uniform", "Run to the Hills" and "The Trooper"
- Faith No More had their performance filmed at The Brixton Academy in 1990. The performance was released on VHS and subsequently to DVD and is titled You Fat Bastards: Live at the Brixton Academy.
- In Bed With Carter was filmed at Brixton Academy. It features a live gig of Carter The Unstoppable Sex Machine (Carter USM).
- The film 9 Songs features numerous performances (e.g., Franz Ferdinand) all shot at Brixton Academy.
- Suede's VHS/DVD Love and Poison, originally released in 1993, was filmed at Brixton Academy.
- In 1990, AC/DC filmed the music video for their song "Thunderstruck" at the academy.
- In 1987, the Pet Shop Boys and Dusty Springfield recorded the music video for What Have I Done to Deserve This? at the venue.
- In 1989, Marillion filmed the music video for their song "Hooks In You" at the venue.
- Boy George and Culture Club filmed the video for their 1986 top-ten hit "Move Away" at the Brixton Academy. The video has extensive footage of the venue, including the entrance hall, the staircase and the circle. The band is also seen as silent film-stars racing cars across the venues former film-screen.
- Video shoots for Wham! were held at the venue.
- Billy Ocean's video for "When The Going Gets Tough, The Tough Get Going" on the soundtrack for The Jewel of the Nile was shot in Brixton Academy.
- Elegies, the 2005 DVD from Machine Head featured material recorded at the Brixton Academy while on tour the previous year.
- The Mighty Boosh Live DVD was recorded at the Brixton Academy in 2006.
- The video for Who's Got A Match? by Biffy Clyro was recorded at Brixton Academy in October 2007.
- Moloko recorded a live DVD: 11,000 Clicks at The Brixton Academy on 22 November 2003. It was the last show of a long tour for Moloko and was likely their final performance as a band.
- N.E.R.D. recorded their second single "Spaz" from third album Seeing Sounds at The Brixton Academy on 14 June 2008.
- Bullet For My Valentine recorded their gig for the DVD The Poison: Live at Brixton at Brixton on 28 January 2006.
- Alanis Morissette Flavor of Entanglement tour was televised in the UK.
- On 26 June 2009, Dave Matthews Band filmed the music video for their second single, "Why I Am".
- Placebo filmed the video for their 1999 single "Every You Every Me" during a gig at the academy.
- A concert in 1992 by Ride at Brixton Academy was recorded for the VHS Going Blank Again – Live at Brixton Academy (also known as Brixton).
- You Me At Six, filmed the music video for their song "Underdog" and "Reckless" at Brixton Academy.
- Gabriella Cilmi filmed the video for her 2010 single Hearts Don't Lie at the venue.
- Queens of the Stone Age's Over the Years and Through the Woods DVD was partly recorded at Brixton Academy. It also features a live CD.
- Deadmau5 recorded 5 videos off 2010 album 4×4=12
- DJ Shadow, In Tune and On Time.
- Meat Loaf's 23 February 1985 show was recorded and released as the video Bad Attitude Live!
- Placebo – We Come In Pieces.
- Groove Armada – Brixton Academy (13–14 December 2002) – available with The Best of Groove Armada: Limited Edition CD+DVD set
- Steel Panther recorded their live DVD British Invasion at the Brixton Academy in 2010, and was released in late 2012.
- The Smashing Pumpkins recorded their performance in 1996, selective songs from the performance appears on DVD which is on their recent reissue of Mellon Collie and the Infinite Sadness.
- The music video for the song "Run Free" by Asking Alexandria was filmed at Brixton.
- Asking Alexandria's performance at Brixton in January 2013 was recorded and is set to be released as a live DVD with bonus extras on 15 December 2014.
- Babymetal – Live in London – Includes performance recorded 8 November 2014. Released 20 May 2015.
- Pulp – F.E.E.L.I.N.G.C.A.L.L.E.D.L.I.V.E. recorded 21 December 1995. Reissued on ultimate live DVD
- Rammstein recorded 4 songs performed at Brixton in February 2005 (Sonne, Ohne dich, Rein Raus and Feuer Frei) and released on Völkerball.
- Sea Girls launched a short documentary titled "Brixton at Night", that featured fan interviews and live performance clips from the band's sold-out headline show at Brixton Academy in 2021.
- The Prodigy recorded a concert on 20 December 1997 which is featured on the DVD edition of Their Law: The Singles 1990–2005.
