= My Friend (Groove Armada song) =

2001 single by Groove Armada

Single by Groove Armada

from the album Goodbye Country (Hello Nightclub)
- Released: 5 November 2001
- Length: 5:00
- Label: Pepper; Jive Electro
- Songwriters: Keith Crouch; Glen McKinney; Bill Curtis; Richard Cornwell
- Producer: Groove Armada

Groove Armada singles chronology
"Superstylin'" (2001)	"My Friend" (2001)	"Purple Haze" (2002)

"My Friend" is a song by English electronic music duo Groove Armada, released as the second single from their third studio album, Goodbye Country (Hello Nightclub) (2001), on 5 November 2001.

== Content ==
The song features uncredited vocals by Celetia Martin and contains a sample from "Got to Learn How to Dance" by Fatback Band and samples a drum break from Skull Snaps' "It's a New Day". The lyrics are an interpolation from Brandy's 1995 hit "Best Friend".

== Release ==
The song was featured in a Dutch television commercial for Royal Club soft drinks in 2002, which resulted in a re-release of the single in the Netherlands and a higher charting in the Dutch singles charts than the year before.

== Music video ==
The music video features a woman (played by model Sarah Wietzel) going through a typical day at work, interspersed with scenes from a holiday with her friends.

== Track listings ==
CD

1. "My Friend"
2. "My Friend (Dorfmeister vs. Madrid de los Austrias Dub)"
3. "My Friend (Swag's Good Buddy Remix)"

12-inch vinyl

A1. "My Friend (Rabbit in the Moon's Old Soul Mix)" – 8:56
A2. "My Friend (Album Version)" – 4:53
B1. "My Friend (Dorfmeister vs. Madrid De Los Austrias Dub)" – 6:20
B2. "My Friend (Kinnder "Oneness" Mix)" – 6:20
C1. "My Friend (DJ Icey Around The Way Mix)" – 5:51
C2. "My Friend (Rabbit in the Moon Dub)" – 9:08
D1. "My Friend (Swag's Good Buddy Remix)" – 7:36
D2. "My Friend (Swag's Version Dub)" – 7:12

== Charts ==
Weekly chart performance for "My Friend"
Chart (2001–2003)	Peak position
Australia (ARIA)	59
Belgium (Ultratip Bubbling Under Flanders)	2
Italy (FIMI)	10
Netherlands (Dutch Top 40)	13
Netherlands (Single Top 100)	20
New Zealand (Recorded Music NZ)	21
Scottish Singles Sales (Official Charts)	47
UK Singles (Official Charts)	36
UK Dance (Official Charts)	9
UK Indie (Official Charts)	4

== Certifications ==
Certifications and sales for "My Friend"
Region	Certification	Certified units/sales
New Zealand (RMNZ)	Platinum	30,000^{‡}
United Kingdom (BPI) Sales since 2004	Silver	200,000^{‡}
^{‡} Sales+streaming figures based on certification alone.

== Release history ==
Release dates and formats for "My Friend"
Region	Date	Format(s)	Label(s)	Ref.
United Kingdom	5 November 2001	12-inch vinyl; CD; cassette	Pepper	
Australia	12 November 2001	CD	Jive Electro	
