= Fenech-Soler =

English electropop band

- Fenech-Soler in 2011. L–R: Andrew Lindsay, Ross Duffy, Ben Duffy and Daniel Soler

Background information
- Origin: King's Cliffe, Northamptonshire, England
- Genres: Synthpop; indie pop; indietronica
- Years active: 2006–2018
- Labels: So; B-Unique; Warner Bros.
- Past members: Daniel Fenech-Soler; Andrew Lindsay; Ross Duffy; Ben Duffy
- Website: www.fenechsoler.co.uk

Fenech-Soler were an English electropop band from King's Cliffe, Northamptonshire, England, that formed in 2006. They were originally a four-member band and consisting of brothers Ross and Ben Duffy, Daniel Fenech-Soler and Andrew Lindsay. The latter two left the band in 2016. The name Fenech-Soler is taken from Daniel Soler's full surname, which is Maltese. The band's sound has been compared to Friendly Fires and Delphic for their "hybrid of summery indie and big dance-inflected melodies". Fenech-Soler are signed to So Recordings.

== Career ==
Fenech-Soler's self-titled debut studio album was released in 2010 and included three singles. The single "Stop and Stare" was named by BBC Radio 1 DJ Greg James as 'Record of the Week' and 'Weekend Anthem' and Dutch public broadcaster NOS used "Demons" as an anthem for their 2010–11 UEFA Champions League broadcasts. Both "Lies" and "Demons" were playlisted by Radio 1. The band recorded a Radio 1 Live Lounge session for Jo Whiley in February 2011.

Ben Duffy sang on the Groove Armada single "Paper Romance" for their Black Light (2010).

On 13 March 2011, it was announced that Ben Duffy had been diagnosed with testicular cancer and would have to undergo a course of chemotherapy. This caused the cancellation of the nine-date UK tour. The cancer was diagnosed in its early stages and two months later it was announced that the treatment was '100% successful' and Duffy was 'now in complete remission'. The band returned to a busy summer schedule of 23 festivals including Glastonbury and V Festival. Fenech-Soler donated all proceeds from their 18 April 2011 single "Stop and Stare" to the Teenage Cancer Trust. That same year, the band was a supporting act for the White Lies, Kelis, Robyn and Example.

The band released their second album, Rituals, on 30 September 2013. The release of the album was announced following the announcement of a UK tour, which coincided with the release of the single "Magnetic" in March. The album's second single, "Last Forever", was released early in September prior to the album.

In 2014, Fenech-Soler performed at a medal awards ceremony at the 2014 Winter Olympics in Sochi. In addition to their own work, they are also known for their remix work, including a remix of "Self Control" by Sunday Girl, "Kickstarts" by Example,"MY KZ, YR BF" by Everything Everything and "Hollywood" by Marina and the Diamonds.

Fenech-Soler co-wrote and featured on the Groove Armada track "Paper Romance", taken from their album Black Light (2010). Fenech-Soler have appeared on Channel 4's EVO Rooms, NME Takeover and BBC Switch.

Since leaving Fenech-Soler, Andrew Lindsay has worked as a live touring member of both Ry X's band and Two Door Cinema Club.

== Awards and nominations ==
- 2010: Q Award nomination
- 2011: Nomination for the 10th Annual Independent Music Awards under the "Dance/Electronica" category for "Lies".

== Discography ==
=== Studio albums ===
Year	Album details	Peak chart positions
Year	Album details	UK
2010	Fenech-Soler: Released: 27 September 2010; Label: B-Unique; Formats: CD, download	85
2013	Rituals: Released: 30 September 2013; Label: Warner Bros.; Formats: LP, CD, download	120
2017	Zilla: Released: 3 February 2017; Label: So Recordings; Formats: LP, CD, download	-

=== Extended plays ===
Year	EP details
2009	The Cult of Romance: Released: 10 May 2009; Label: Vulture; Formats: 12" vinyl, download
2011	White Versions: Released: 28 February 2011; Label: (self-released); Formats: Download
2013	iTunes Festival: London 2013: Released: 5 September 2013; Label: B-Unique; Formats: Download
2014	Stop and Stare EP: Released: 25 March 2014 (US); Label: SBMC; Formats: Download
2014	Remix EP: Released: 19 April 2014 (UK); Label: So; Formats: Limited-edition 12" vinyl
2014	Glow EP: Released: 5 June 2014; Label: (self-released); Formats: Download
2016	Kaleidoscope EP: Released: 16 September 2016; Label: So; Formats: Download
2017	Covers EP: Released: 8 March 2017; Label: So; Formats: Download; Cover versions of I Wanna Be Your Lover by Prince, Criminal World by Metro, Show Me Love by Robin S., This Must Be the Place (Naive Melody) by Talking Heads and Control by Janet Jackson

=== Singles ===
==== As lead artist ====
Year	Title	Peak chart positions	Album
Year	Title	UK	Album
2009	"Lies"	—	Non-album singles (Note: Original independently-released Moda Music releases. Both tracks feature on self-titled album and were later re-released with new remixes.)
2010	"Stop and Stare"	106	Non-album singles
2010	"Lies"	126	Fenech-Soler
2011	"Demons"	162	Fenech-Soler
2011	"Stop and Stare"	—	Fenech-Soler
2012	"All I Know"	—	Rituals
2013	"Magnetic"	—	Rituals
2013	"Last Forever"	—	Rituals

==== As featuring artist ====
Year	Title	Peak chart positions	Album
Year	Title	UK	Album
2010	"Paper Romance" (Groove Armada featuring Fenech-Soler and SaintSaviour)	196	Black Light

==== Promotional singles ====
Year	Title	Album
2013	"Maiyu"	Rituals
2013	"In Our Blood"	Rituals
