= White Light =

White Light may refer to:

- White light, a combination of lights of different wavelengths

== Music ==
- White Light (The Corrs album), 2015
- White Light (Gene Clark album) and its title track, 1971
- White Light (Groove Armada album), 2010
- "White Light" (George Michael song), 2012
- "White Light" (Superfly song), 2015
- White Light/White Heat, a 1968 album by The Velvet Underground
  - "White Light/White Heat" (song), the title track
- "White Light/Violet Sauce", a 2005 song by Namie Amuro
- "Wit licht" (or "White Light" in English), a 2008 song by Marco Borsato
- "White Light", a song by Gorillaz from the album Demon Days
- "White Light", a song by Shura from the album Nothing's Real
- "White Light", a song by Two Hours Traffic from their self-titled debut album

== Literature ==
- White Light (novel), a 1980 novel by Rudy Rucker

== Film and television ==
- "White Light" (The 4400)
- White Light, a 1991 film directed by Al Waxman
- The Silent Army, a 2008 Dutch film also known in Dutch as Wit licht or in English as White Light
- "White Light" (Mighty Morphin Power Rangers)

== See also ==
- Whitelighter, a type of character in the Charmed television series
