= Yunioshi =

Electronic rock band from Nottingham, England

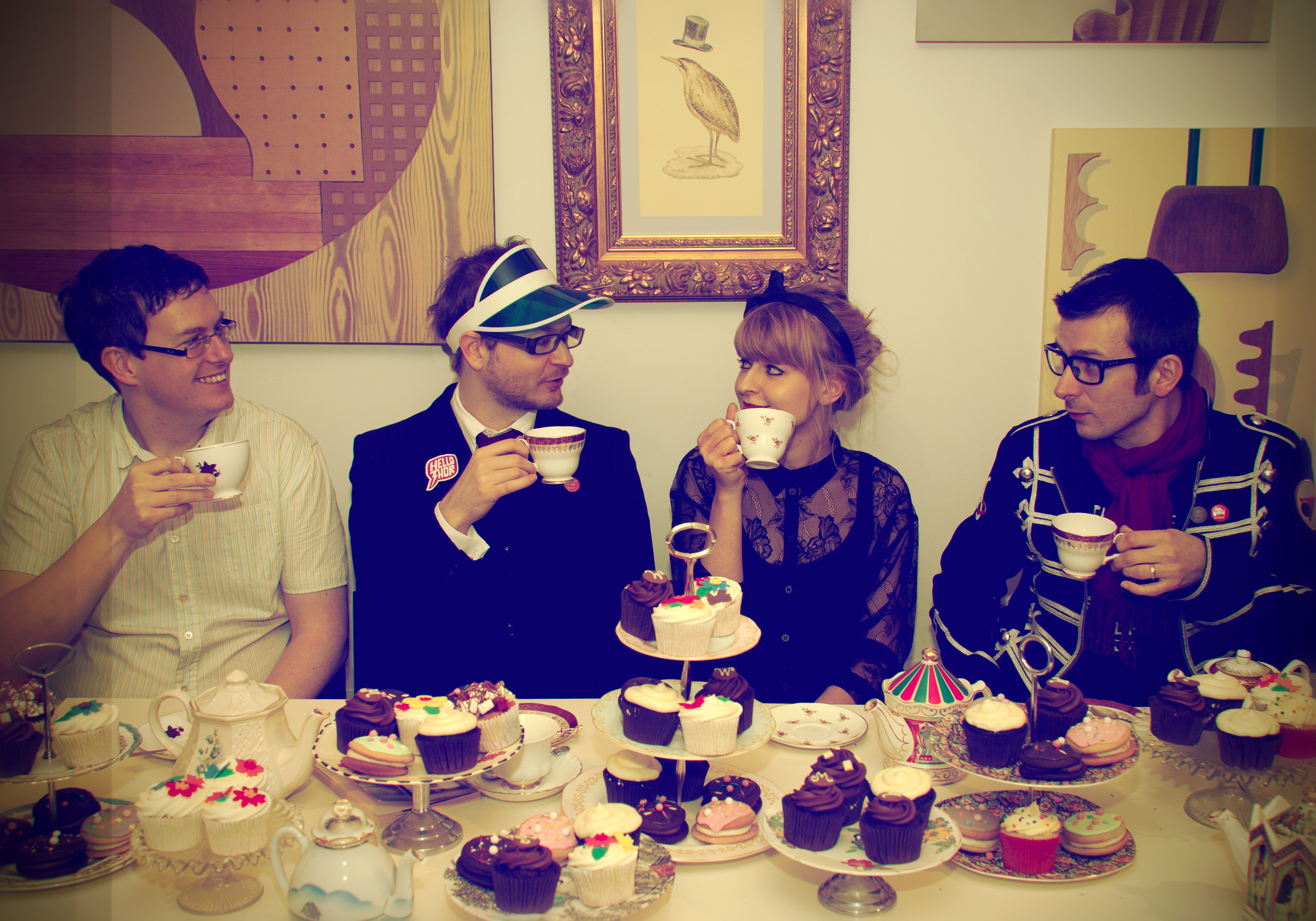
- The band in 2011

Background information
- Origin: Nottingham, England
- Genres: Electronic rock, breakbeat
- Years active: 2006–present
- Labels: Unsigned
- Members: Rob Yunioshi; Anna Yunioshi Suzuki; James Yunioshi; Hakushi Yunioshi

Yunioshi are an electronic rock band from Nottingham, England, formed in October 2006. They describe their sound as "robot funk". The name Yunioshi came from I.Y. Yunioshi, a character in Truman Capote's novella, Breakfast at Tiffany's.

Their sound was described by TuneTribe as 'the exact place where found sounds and breakbeats merge with left of centre indie pop; all lilting Beck-style rhythms and hummable hooks' and by LeftLion as "Beck dry humping the Flaming Lips with the robot from Lost In Space looking on and filming all the action for his own personal collection. The perfect pop band. They're as catchy as hell."

== Members ==
- Rob Yunioshi (vocals, guitar, keyboards)
- Anna Suzuki Yunioshi (vocals, keyboards, Stylophone and additional instrumentation)
- James Yunioshi (bass, Roland TB-303)
- Hakushi Yunioshi (drums, additional percussion).

== History ==
Their single, "Mymo", was used by Kia for the soundtrack to their UK television advertising campaign Cube for the Kia Carens model between December 2006 and February 2007.

Other tracks that have been used in advertising include "Thunderbird", which was used to advertise South Park on Comedy Central as well as being used numerous times by Sky Sports and Setanta Sports. "Leisure Rules" was also used as part of Vauxhall Astra campaign.

Yunioshi were selected by BBC Introducing as a band to look out for. They have recorded sessions at BBC Maida Vale Studios and performed on various BBC Introducing festival stages in the UK. They have appeared live on Tom Robinson's BBC Radio 6 Music show as well as further airplay on Steve Lamacq, Huw Stephens and BBC Local Radio stations. There was a quiz about the band on Stephen Merchant's BBC Radio 6 Music show.

They played the Bloom, Summer Sundae and Splendour in Nottingham festivals, in July and August 2009. In 2010 the band played numerous live events in the UK to a growing fan base. Later in the year they went to Reykjavík to play the Iceland Airwaves festival. Upon their return from Iceland they headlined the Hockley Hustle festival at Nottingham Contemporary.

They provide cake for their audiences at live shows. They refer to the Yunioshi Catering Corporation as the provider of the cake. There is normally a link to the event or venue in some tenuous way.

== Discography ==
EPs	Year of release
EP1	2006
Welcome to the 1950s	2007
EP2	2008
How to survive a robot uprising	2010

Singles	Year of release
Mymo	2007

Compilations	Year of release
Leap-autumn/winter	2006
Leap-winter/spring	2007
Kind Assault	2008

== Television and advertising ==
- Kia Carens Cube UK TV Campaign (2006/2007) - "Mymo"
- Vauxhall Astra campaign (2007/2008) - "Leisure Rules"
- Setanta Sports - Harry Redknapp Montage (December 2008) - "Thunderbird"
- Comedy Central South Park UK TV Campaign (September 2009) - "Thunderbird"
