= Patrick & Eugene =

English musical duo

Patrick and Eugene
- Origin: England
- Years active: 2004–present
- Label: Tummy Touch Records
- Members: Patrick Dawes; Eugene Bezodis

Patrick & Eugene are an English musical duo, made up of Patrick Dawes (who found fame playing percussion for Groove Armada) and Eugene Bezodis (bass player for The Trudy). They are best known for their songs, "The Birds and the Bees", which was featured in two commercials; one for Volkswagen and another for Gordon's Gin, as well as appearing in YouTube classic "The to-do list", and "Don't Stop", which featured in a commercial for The Laughing Cow cheese. The title track to their 2009 album Altogether Now (Birds Bees Flowers Trees) can be heard during the closing credits of two American series, both Showtime's Weeds and ABC's Grey's Anatomy. Their music has also been used for the Coen Brothers' Burn After Reading and the trailer the 2007 film Mr. Bean's Holiday.

== Reception ==
In a review of their 2009 album Altogether Now (Birds Bees Flowers Trees), critic Greg Barbrick compared their music to the comedy style of Monty Python, as comedy that is uniquely British. He also compared them to The Bonzo Dog Doo-Dah Band.

== Discography ==
- Postcard from Summerisle (2004)
- Everything & Everyone (2008)
- Altogether Now (Birds Bees Flowers Trees) (2009)
