= The Birds and the Bees (disambiguation) =

The birds and the bees is an idiom that refers to courtship and sex.

The Birds and the Bees may also refer to:

== Film and television ==
- The Birds and the Bees (film), a 1956 remake of The Lady Eve
- "Birds and Bees", a 1979 episode of Diff'rent Strokes
- "The Birds and the Bees" (Doctors), a 2004 television episode

== Music ==
- The Birds and the Bees (EP), a split EP by Trial Kennedy and Horsell Common
- "The Birds and the Bees" (Jewel Akens song)
- "Birds & the Bees", a song by Baby Keem
- "(The Same Thing Happens with) The Birds and the Bees", a song from the film The Birds and the Bees
- "The Birds and the Bees", a song by Breathe Carolina from Gossip
- "The Birds and the Bees", a song by Patrick & Eugene from Postcard from Summerisle
- "The Birds and the Bees", a song by The Real Tuesday Weld from The Return of the Clerkenwell Kid
- "Birds and Bees", a song by Warm Sounds
- "Birds & Bees", a song by Carly Rose Sonenclar
- "Birds and the Bees", a 2020 single by Indian singer Shakthisree Gopalan

== See also ==
- The Bird and the Bee, an American indie musical duo
  - The Bird and the Bee (album), the eponymous debut album by The Bird and the Bee
- The Birds & the B-Sides, an album by Shonen Knife
- The Bird and the Bee Sides, a double EP by Relient K
- The Birds and the Bees II: Antics, a video game
