= Sugardaddy (duo) =

English electronic music duo

- Origin: London, England
- Genre: Synthpop
- Years active: 2006–present
- Label: Tune Tribe Records
- Members: Tom Findlay; Tim Hutton

Sugardaddy is an English electronic music duo formed in 2006, consisting of Tom Findlay (one half of Groove Armada) and session musician Tim Hutton (Hybrid, Groove Armada, Ian Brown, Junkie XL). The band signed to Tune Tribe Records in 2006. "Treat Me Like A Dog" appears on the soundtrack of I Want Candy.

== Discography ==
=== Singles ===
- "Chasing My Tail" – 26 June 2006
- "State of Play" – 16 October 2006

=== Albums ===
- It's Good To Get High with the Wife – 25 September 2006
