= At the River =

1997 single by Groove Armada

Single by Groove Armada

from the album Northern Star
- Released: 1997; 26 July 1999 (re-release)
- Genre: Downtempo; chill-out
- Length: 6:33
- Label: Tummy Touch; Pepper (1999)
- Songwriters: Cato; Findlay; Allan Jeffrey; Claire Rothrock; Milton Yakus
- Producer: Groove Armada

Groove Armada singles chronology
| "At the River" (1997) | "I See You Baby" (1999) |

1999 re-release
- Cover of the CD single

"At the River" is a song by British duo Groove Armada. It was released as a single in 1997 on 7-inch vinyl, limited to 500 copies. The song appeared on the duo's debut album Northern Star and again on their second album, Vertigo, released in April 1999.

== Production and content ==
The song was written and produced whilst the duo were staying in a cottage in Ambleside in the Lake District, writing material for their first album.

A sample of Patti Page's "Old Cape Cod" forms the basis of the song: the lines/opening lyrics "If you're fond of sand dunes and salty air/Quaint little villages here and there", sung in Page's multi-tracked close-harmony, are repeated throughout the song, with the addition of synthesizer bass and slowed-down drum programming. The band found "Old Cape Cod" when they bought a 1950s compilation album from a bargain bin in a shop in Ambleside for 50p. The sampler they were using could only record ten seconds of audio at a time; Tom Findlay suggested that the use of only one section of the song's lyric left the track open to interpretation, "giving it a slightly eerie, melancholy quality". A blues-style trombone solo inspired by the spiritual song "Shall We Gather at the River?" was performed by Andy Cato. Cato had taken his trombone to the Lake District, because he wanted to practice before an upcoming jazz concert: when he wanted to record the trombone melody, he had to improvise a microphone by swapping around the wires in a speaker from the cottage's Alba hi-fi as the duo did not have a microphone with them and were staying in a remote location. Cato credited this as giving the recording "a real vintage character".

== Release ==
"At the River" was originally released as a single on 7-inch vinyl in 1997 in a limited pressing of 500 copies, and appeared on the duo's debut album Northern Star as well as its follow-up, Vertigo, in 1999. Rob da Bank made it his single of the week in DJ Mag: he subsequently handed a copy to Zoe Ball, who started playing it on The Radio 1 Breakfast Show. Although the BBC Radio 1 playlist committee initially believed the song was too slow for radio, support from radio producers and listeners meant that it forced its way into rotation. On 26 July 1999, the single was re-released on 12-inch and CD. This re-release peaked at number 19 in the UK Singles Chart.

== Use in media ==
It was used in adverts for Marks & Spencer Food in 2006, and in the films About Time and The Low Down. Findlay later admitted that he regretted giving permission for the song's use by M&S. After refusing to perform the track live due to the adverts, the duo returned it to their sets at Glastonbury Festival 2008.

== Track listing ==
All songs were written by Andy Cato, Tom Findlay, Allan Jeffrey, Claire Rothrock, and Milton Yakus, except where noted.

7-inch vinyl

Side A
| No. | Title | Length |
|---|---|---|
| 1. | "At the River" |

Side B
| No. | Title | Writer(s) | Length |
|---|---|---|---|
| 1. | "Disco Insert" | Tim 'Love' Lee |

12-inch vinyl

Side A
| No. | Title | Length |
|---|---|---|
| 1. | "At the River (English Riviera Mix)" | 6:13 |
| 2. | "At the River (Original Version)" | 6:33 |

Side B
| No. | Title | Length |
|---|---|---|
| 1. | "At the River (Presence Mix)" | 5:45 |

CD

Pepper Records release
| No. | Title | Length |
|---|---|---|
| 1. | "At the River (Radio Edit)" | 3:14 |
| 2. | "At the River (English Riviera Mix)" | 6:13 |
| 3. | "At the River (Presence Mix)" | 5:48 |
| 4. | "At the River (English Riviera Edit)" | 3:49 |

Jive Electro release
| No. | Title | Length |
|---|---|---|
| 1. | "At the River (Radio Edit)" | 3:14 |
| 2. | "At the River (English Riviera Mix)" | 6:13 |
| 3. | "At the River (Presence Mix)" | 5:48 |
| 4. | "At the River (English Riviera Edit)" | 3:49 |
| 5. | "At the River (Original Version)" | 6:33 |

== Charts ==
Peaked 19 in Uk

== Certifications ==
| Region | Certification | Certified units/sales |
|---|---|---|
| New Zealand (RMNZ) | Platinum | 30,000^{‡} |
| United Kingdom (BPI) | Gold | 400,000^{‡} |
^{‡} Sales+streaming figures based on certification alone.
