= Fenech-Soler (album) =

Studio album by Fenech-Soler
- Released: 27 September 2010
- Genre: Electropop
- Length: 42:38
- Label: B-Unique

Fenech-Soler chronology
Fenech-Soler (2010)	Rituals (2013)

Singles from Fenech-Soler
- 1. "Lies" Released: 17 September 2010; 2. "Demons" Released: 4 February 2011; 3. "Stop and Stare" Released: 15 April 2011

Fenech-Soler is the eponymous debut studio album by British electropop band Fenech-Soler. It was released on 27 September 2010 by B-Unique Records.

The album includes the singles "Lies", "Demons" and "Stop and Stare". The three single were included in the 2014 special edition of their second studio album, Rituals along with the eighth track "Stonebridge".

== Track listing ==
No.	Title	Length
1.	"Battlefields"	4:02
2.	"Lies"	3:17
3.	"Golden Sun"	4:15
4.	"Stop and Stare"	4:06
5.	"The Great Unknown"	5:35
6.	"Demons"	3:44
7.	"LA Love"	4:19
8.	"Stonebridge"	4:32
9.	"Contender"	4:48
10.	"Walk Alone"	4:00

iTunes bonus track
No.	Title	Length
11.	"Lies" (Totally Enormous Extinct Dinosaurs Remix)	4:50
