= Rituals (Fenech-Soler album) =

Studio album by Fenech-Soler
- Released: 25 September 2013
- Recorded: May–November 2012
- Genre: Alternative rock; electropop
- Length: 49:18
- Label: Warner Bros.; B-Unique
- Producer: Ross Duffy; Ben Duffy; Daniel Soler; Andrew Lindsay; Johan Klereby; Tim Goldsworthy; Linus Eklöw; Fin Dow-Smith; Svidden; Sam Watts

Fenech-Soler chronology
Fenech-Soler (2010)	Rituals (2013)

Rituals is the second studio album by British electropop band Fenech-Soler. It was released on 25 September 2013 by Warner Bros. Records and B-Unique Records. This album marked Fenech-Soler's major label debut. Their previous record was released independently. The album features the band' s follow-up to the band's 2012–13 singles "All I Know", "Magnetic" and "Last Forever".

A special edition of the album with a new track listing was released a year later on 25 August 2014. This edition replaced the band's first full-length US release, (which was subsequently removed from online services). It features four tracks from their previous self-titled debut studio album.

== Packaging ==
The artwork for Rituals features a photograph titled "Star Bows" taken by South African professional photographer Andrew McGibbon. The image depicts a horse named Star, illuminated by Strobe lighting, in a bowing pose. The photograph is part of McGibbon's collection "All the Wild Horses," which was originally released online in April 2012. The artist statement for the work elaborates:

"For thousands of years the horse has been mankind's closest ally. The horse made travel and development possible. We tethered, weighted and reigned them. We captured, stabled and trained them.

Ever willing, the horse was the magnificent tool of man’s ingenuity. The horse is a beast of legend, taking on its own character, personality, emotion and mythology.

However, with the advent of the steam engine the horse was made obsolete, and now they are resigned to the realm of shows and races, a world of equestrian sport, a mere shadow of the beast’s former glory.

All the Wild Horses is a tribute to the beast that has made much of what we call life possible. The images are unique and have a style to them reminiscent of the portraiture of the rich and famous. The artist has attempted, and succeeded, to show a sense of personality and emotion – sadness in some cases and pride in others.

Painstakingly lit, this body of work is about the horse itself to which we all feel a connection, whether it's obvious or deep down in our collective subconscious. There is a sense of awe that this beast inspires in each and everyone of us".

– Ray Lamontagne.

== Track listing ==
All tracks are written by Fenech-Soler, except where noted.

Rituals
No.	Title	Writer(s)	Producer(s)	Length
1.	"Youth"	Ross Duffy; Ben Duffy; Daniel Soler; Andrew Lindsay; Joel Pott	Ross Duffy; Ben Duffy; Daniel Soler; Andrew Lindsay	4:47
2.	"All I Know"	R Duffy; B Duffy; Soler; Lindsay; Thomas Edward Butler	R Duffy; B Duffy; Soler; Lindsay; Johan Klereby; Tim Goldsworthy	3:26
3.	"In Our Blood"	R Duffy; B Duffy; Soler; Lindsay; Jon Green	R Duffy; B Duffy; Soler; Lindsay; Klereby	4:23
4.	"Ritual I"		R Duffy; B Duffy; Soler; Lindsay	1:01
5.	"Last Forever"	R Duffy; B Duffy; Soler; Lindsay; Butler	R Duffy; B Duffy; Soler; Lindsay; Linus Eklöw; Klereby	4:53
6.	"Somebody"	R Duffy; B Duffy; Soler; Lindsay; Fin Dow-Smith	R Duffy; B Duffy; Soler; Lindsay; Dow-Smith	5:29
7.	"Fading"	R Duffy; B Duffy; Soler; Lindsay; Julian Emery; Green	R Duffy; B Duffy; Soler; Lindsay; Svidden	4:10
8.	"Magnetic"	R Duffy; B Duffy; Soler; Lindsay; Emery; Green; Stefan Storm; Daniel Zak Watts	R Duffy; B Duffy; Soler; Lindsay; Svidden	3:51
9.	"Maiyu"		R Duffy; B Duffy; Soler; Lindsay; Sam Watts	5:44
10.	"Two Cities"		R Duffy; B Duffy; Soler; Lindsay	4:58
11.	"Ritual II"		R Duffy; B Duffy; Soler; Lindsay	1:41
12.	"Glow"	R Duffy; B Duffy; Soler; Lindsay; Dow-Smith	R Duffy; B Duffy; Soler; Lindsay; Dow-Smith	4:55
Total length:				49:18

Deluxe Edition
No.	Title	Writer(s)	Length
13.	"All I Know" (Live at Electric Ballroom)	R Duffy; B Duffy; Soler; Lindsay; Butler	4:01
14.	"Last Forever" (Live at Electric Ballroom)	R Duffy; B Duffy; Soler; Lindsay; Butler	4:56
15.	"Somebody" (White Version)	R Duffy; B Duffy; Soler; Lindsay; Dow-Smith	4:46
16.	"Two Cities" (White Version)	R Duffy; B Duffy; Soler; Lindsay	4:13
17.	"Making Rituals" (video)		14:05
Total length:			81:19

US Special Edition
No.	Title	Writer(s)	Producer(s)	Length
1.	"Youth"	Ross Duffy; Ben Duffy; Daniel Soler; Andrew Lindsay; Joel Pott	Ross Duffy; Ben Duffy; Daniel Soler; Andrew Lindsay	4:47
2.	"Last Forever"	R Duffy; B Duffy; Soler; Lindsay; Thomas Edward Butler	R Duffy; B Duffy; Soler; Lindsay; Linus Eklöw; Johan Klereby	4:54
3.	"Stop and Stare"	R Duffy; B Duffy; Soler; Lindsay	R Duffy; B Duffy; Soler; Lindsay	4:07
4.	"In Our Blood"	R Duffy; B Duffy; Soler; Lindsay; Jon Green	R Duffy; B Duffy; Soler; Lindsay; Klereby	4:23
5.	"Somebody"	R Duffy; B Duffy; Soler; Lindsay; Fin Dow-Smith	R Duffy; B Duffy; Soler; Lindsay; Dow-Smith	5:29
6.	"Lies"	R Duffy; B Duffy; Soler; Lindsay	R Duffy; B Duffy; Soler; Lindsay	3:19
7.	"Demons"	R Duffy; B Duffy; Soler; Lindsay	R Duffy; B Duffy; Soler; Lindsay	3:44
8.	"Fading"	R Duffy; B Duffy; Soler; Lindsay; Julian Emery; Green	R Duffy; B Duffy; Soler; Lindsay; Svidden	4:10
9.	"Stonebridge"	R Duffy; B Duffy; Soler; Lindsay	R Duffy; B Duffy; Soler; Lindsay	4:31
10.	"All I Know"	R Duffy; B Duffy; Soler; Lindsay; Butler	R Duffy; B Duffy; Soler; Lindsay; Klereby; Tim Goldsworthy	3:26
11.	"Magnetic"	R Duffy; B Duffy; Soler; Lindsay; Emery; Green; Stefan Storm; Daniel Zak Watts	R Duffy; B Duffy; Soler; Lindsay; Svidden	3:51
12.	"Two Cities"	R Duffy; B Duffy; Soler; Lindsay	R Duffy; B Duffy; Soler; Lindsay	4:59
Total length:				51:40

Digital-exclusive bonus tracks
No.	Title	Producer(s)	Length
13.	"Lies" (Alex Metric Remix)	Alex Metric (add.)	6:04
14.	"The Cult of Romance" (Alan Braxe Remix)	Alan Braxe (add.)	5:10
Total length:			62:54

== Personnel ==
Adapted from Rituals liner notes.

Fenech-Soler

- Ben Duffy – lead vocals
- Ross Duffy – guitar
- Daniel Soler – bass, keyboard
- Andrew Lindsay – percussion

Additional musicians

- Dominic Greensmith – percussion (track 2)
- Linus Eklöw – additional instruments (track 8)
- Svidden – additional instruments (track 8)

Technical production

- Dan Grech-Marguerat – mixing (tracks 1, 3–5, 7, 9–12)
- Duncan Fuller – assistant mixing (tracks 1, 3–5, 7, 9–12)
- Wez Clarke – mixing (track 2, 8)
- Neil Comber – mixing (track 6)
- John Davis – mastering (tracks 1, 3–12)
- Stuart Hawkes – mastering (track 2)
- Bruno Ellingham – engineer (track 2)

Artwork

- Non-Format – art direction, design
- Andrew McGibbon – album artwork, Stars Bow
- Jenna Foxton – photography

== Release history ==
Region	Date	Format	Label	Catalog no.
Japan	25 September 2013	Digital download	Warner Bros.	none
Australia	27 September 2013	Digital download	Warner Bros.	none
Benelux	27 September 2013	Digital download	Warner Benelux	none
France	27 September 2013	Digital download	Warner Bros.	none
New Zealand	27 September 2013	Digital download	Warner Bros.	none
United Kingdom	30 September 2013	Digital download	Warner Bros.; B-Unique	none
Mexico	1 October 2013	Digital download	Warner Bros.	none
United Kingdom	7 October 2013	CD	Warner Bros.; B-Unique	5053105802920
United Kingdom	27 November 2013	LP	Warner Bros.; B-Unique	5053105802913
France	26 February 2014	CD	Warner Bros.	unknown
United States	25 August 2014	CD	So; Silva Screen	unknown
United States	25 August 2014	Digital download	So; Silva Screen	none
