= Vertigo (Groove Armada album) =

Studio album by Groove Armada
- Released: 24 May 1999
- Length: 69:06
- Label: Jive Electro
- Producer: Andy Cato; Tom Findlay

Groove Armada chronology
Northern Star (1998)	Vertigo (1999)	The Remixes (2000)

Singles from Vertigo
- 1. "If Everybody Looked the Same" Released: 26 April 1999; 2. "At the River" Released: 26 July 1999; 3. "I See You Baby" Released: November 1999

Professional ratings
Review scores
Source	Rating
AllMusic	4/5 stars
Entertainment Weekly	B+
NME	8/10
Q	4/5 stars
Rolling Stone	3.5/5 stars

Vertigo is the second studio album by the British electronic music duo Groove Armada, released in 1999 on the Jive Electro record label. It contains the well-known singles "At the River" (which was previously featured on the duo's debut album Northern Star) and "I See You Baby".

== Release ==
"I See You Baby" has been used in advertisements for the Ford Fiesta and the Renault Mégane, the latter of which caused a number of complaints due to the song's lyrical content.

== Track listing ==
All tracks are written by Andy Cato and Tom Findlay, except where noted.

No.	Title	Writer(s)	Length
1.	"Chicago"		7:22
2.	"Whatever, Whenever" (featuring M.A.D.)	Cato, Findlay, Joe Skeete, Lorenzo Mills, Steve Douglas	3:49
3.	"Dusk You & Me"	Cato, Findlay, Buck Rams, Al Nevins, Morty Nevins	5:39
4.	"Pre 63"		6:26
5.	"If Everybody Looked the Same"	Cato, Findlay, Ali Muhammad, Eugene Record, James Yancey, Kamaal Fareed, Malik Taylor	3:39
6.	"Serve Chilled"		5:09
7.	"I See You Baby" (featuring Gram'ma Funk)	Cato, Findlay, Toi Sacchi	4:40
8.	"A Private Interlude"		3:54
9.	"At the River"	Cato, Findlay, Allan Jeffrey, Claire Rothrock, Milton Yakus	6:33
10.	"In My Bones" (featuring Gram'ma Funk)	Cato, Findlay, Maurizio Dami, Toi Sacchi	4:44
11.	"Your Song" (featuring Sophie Barker)		5:07
12.	"Inside My Mind (Blue Skies)" (featuring Sophie Barker)	Cato, Findlay, Irving Berlin	7:59

UK bonus track
No.	Title	Writer(s)	Length
13.	"I See You Baby" (Fatboy Slim remix; featuring Gram'ma Funk)	Cato, Findlay, Toi Sacchi	5:43

Japan bonus tracks
No.	Title	Length
13.	"Mary"	4:24
14.	"Rap"	4:15

== Charts ==
Chart (1999–2000)	Peak position
Australian Albums (ARIA)	39
New Zealand Albums (RMNZ)	38
Scottish Albums (OCC)	46
UK Albums (OCC)	23
UK Independent Albums (OCC)	4
Chart (2005)	Peak position
UK Dance Albums (OCC)	25

== Sales and certifications ==
Region	Certification	Certified units/sales
United Kingdom (BPI)	Platinum	300,000^{^}
United States	—	120,000
Summaries
Worldwide	—	1,000,000
^{^} Shipments figures based on certification alone.
