= Black Light (Groove Armada album) =

Studio album by Groove Armada
- Released: 29 January 2010
- Recorded: 2009
- Genres: Dance-pop; electropop; electronic; dance-rock
- Length: 52:46
- Label: Cooking Vinyl
- Producer: Groove Armada

Groove Armada chronology
Soundboy Rock (2007)	Black Light (2010)	White Light (2010)

Professional ratings
Aggregate scores
Source	Rating
Metacritic	75/100
Review scores
Source	Rating
AllMusic	3/5 stars
Consequence of Sound	C+
musicOMH	3/5 stars
NME	6/10
PopMatters	7/10
Q	4/5 stars
Resident Advisor	4/5 stars
Slant	4/5 stars
URB	4.5/5 stars
Uncut	4/5 stars

Black Light is the sixth studio album by English electronic duo Groove Armada. It combines the more mainstream-oriented sound of its predecessor, Soundboy Rock, with the rock spirit of Lovebox, and the band makes use of 1980s synthesisers for the first time. The album is influenced by David Bowie, Fleetwood Mac, Gary Numan, New Order and Roxy Music.

The vocal collaborations on the album include Bryan Ferry, Fenech-Soler, Jess Larrabee, Nick Littlemore, Saint Saviour and Will Young.

Black Light received a nomination for the 53rd Grammy Awards in the category Best Electronic/Dance Album. The song "Paper Romance" is in the soundtrack for the video game FIFA 11.

== Track listing ==
Black Light track listing
No.	Title	Length
1.	"Look Me in the Eye Sister" (featuring Jess Larrabee)	4:07
2.	"Fall Silent" (featuring Nick Littlemore)	4:35
3.	"Just for Tonight" (featuring Jess Larrabee)	4:05
4.	"Not Forgotten" (featuring Nick Littlemore)	5:34
5.	"I Won't Kneel" (featuring Saint Saviour)	4:36
6.	"Cards to Your Heart" (featuring Nick Littlemore)	5:35
7.	"Paper Romance" (featuring Fenech-Soler and Saint Saviour)	6:19
8.	"Warsaw" (featuring Nick Littlemore)	4:04
9.	"Shameless" (featuring Bryan Ferry)	4:48
10.	"Time & Space" (featuring Saint Saviour and Jess Larrabee)	4:53
11.	"History" (featuring Will Young)	4:10
Total length:		52:46

Japanese bonus tracks
No.	Title	Length
12.	"Not Forgotten" (Loose Joint Mix; featuring Nick Littlemore)	6:21
13.	"Shameless" (alternative mix; featuring Bryan Ferry)	5:51
Total length:		64:49

iTunes bonus track
No.	Title	Length
12.	"Time & Space" (Original Disco Mix; featuring Saint Saviour and Jess Larrabee)	6:02

=== North American edition ===
No.	Title	Length
1.	"Warsaw" (featuring Nick Littlemore)	4:04
2.	"History" (featuring Will Young)	4:10
3.	"Cards to Your Heart" (featuring Nick Littlemore)	5:35
4.	"I Won't Kneel" (featuring Saint Saviour)	4:36
5.	"Shameless" (featuring Bryan Ferry)	4:48
6.	"Look Me in the Eye Sister" (featuring Jess Larrabee)	4:07
7.	"Paper Romance" (featuring Fenech-Soler and Saint Saviour)	6:19
8.	"Time & Space" (featuring SaintSaviour and Jess Larrabee)	4:53
9.	"Not Forgotten" (featuring Nick Littlemore)	5:34
10.	"Fall Silent" (featuring Nick Littlemore)	4:35
11.	"Just for Tonight" (featuring Jess Larrabee)	4:05

iTunes bonus track
No.	Title	Length
12.	"Time & Space" (Original Disco Mix; featuring Saint Saviour and Jess Larrabee)	6:02

iTunes deluxe edition bonus track
No.	Title	Length
13.	"Paper Romance" (Classixx Version; featuring Fenech-Soler & Saint Saviour)	6:02
14.	"I Won't Kneel" (Treasure Fingers Epicwave Mix; featuring Saint Saviour)	6:08
15.	"I Won't Kneel" (Treasure Fingers Epicwave Dub; featuring Saint Saviour)	6:08

== Singles ==
Singles from Black Light
Single	Release date
"I Won't Kneel"	23 November 2009
"Paper Romance"	22 February 2010
"Look Me in the Eye Sister"/"Just for Tonight"	3 May 2010
"History" (featuring Will Young)	30 August 2010

== Charts ==
Chart performance for Black Light
Chart (2010)	Peak position
Australian Albums (ARIA)	17
Belgian Albums (Ultratop Flanders)	97
Belgian Albums (Ultratop Wallonia)	71
Irish Albums (IRMA)	47
New Zealand Albums (RMNZ)	23
Scottish Albums (Official Charts)	34
UK Albums (Official Charts)	26
UK Album Downloads (Official Charts)	8
UK Dance Albums (Official Charts)	1
UK Independent Albums (Official Charts)	2
US Top Dance Albums (Billboard)	10
US Independent Albums (Billboard)	48

== Sales ==
Sales for Black Light
Region	Certification	Certified units/sales
United Kingdom	—	35,000
Worldwide	—	100,000
