= Postcard from Summerisle =

Studio album by Patrick & Eugene
- Released: 2004
- Label: Tummy Touch
- Producer: Patrick Dawes, Nils Johnson

Patrick & Eugene chronology
| Postcard from Summerisle (2004) | Everything & Everyone (2008) |

Professional ratings
Review scores
| Source | Rating |
|---|---|
| Allmusic | 4.5/5 stars |
| Jerk Music Critic | 2/5 stars |

Postcard from Summerisle is the first album by the English musical duo Patrick & Eugene.

== Track listing ==
| No. | Title | Writer(s) | Length |
|---|---|---|---|
| 1. | "The Birds and the Bees" | Patrick Dawes, Eugene Bezodis, Simon Eames | 3:43 |
| 2. | "Can't Get You Out of My Head" (Kylie Minogue cover) | Cathy Dennis, Rob Davis | 3:51 |
| 3. | "Souk" | Dawes, Bezodis | 3:21 |
| 4. | "Old Times" | Dawes, Bezodis | 3:48 |
| 5. | "Circus Train" | Dawes, Bezodis | 3:48 |
| 6. | "Feeling Groovy" (Simon & Garfunkel cover) | Paul Simon | 2:56 |
| 7. | "Tribal" | Dawes, Bezodis | 3:23 |
| 8. | "Crazy in Love" (Beyoncé Knowles cover) | Rich Harrison, Beyoncé Knowles, Shawn Carter | 3:50 |
| 9. | "Desert Saraband" | Dawes, Bezodis | 5:00 |
| 10. | "A Dog's Tail" | Dawes, Bezodis, Eames | 3:28 |
| 11. | "The Birds and the Bees (reprise)" | Dawes, Bezodis, Eames | 2:04 |
| 12. | "Postcard from Summerisle" | Dawes, Bezodis | 2:44 |

== Personnel ==
- Patrick Dawes - vocals, percussion, sound effects
- Eugene Bezodis - vocals, saxophone, clarinet, flute

=== Additional personnel ===
- Simon Eames - bass, banjo, melodica, trombone
- Richard Lamy - banjo (4, 11)
- Clive Jenner - drums
- Matt Kloss - double bass
- Keeling Lee - guitar (2)
- Nils Johnson - handclapping (12)
