= Superstylin' =

2001 single by Groove Armada

Single by Groove Armada

from the album Goodbye Country (Hello Nightclub)
- B-side: "Tuning In" (dub mix)
- Released: 13 August 2001
- Genre: House; speed garage
- Length: 6:02 (album version); 3:43 (edited version)
- Label: Pepper; Jive Electro
- Songwriters: Andy Cato; Tom Findlay; Michael Anthony Daniel; Daniel White; Keeling Lee
- Producer: Groove Armada

Groove Armada singles chronology
"I See You Baby" (1999)	"Superstylin'" (2001)	"My Friend" (2001)

Music video
- "Superstylin'" on YouTube

"Superstylin'" is a song by English electronic duo Groove Armada, released as the band's first single on 13 August 2001, from the album Goodbye Country (Hello Nightclub). Vocals were performed by Groove Armada's long-time vocalist MC M.A.D. (Mike Daniels). Groove Armada credited Daniels for the cross-genre sound of the track, saying it was house music with influences of dancehall, reggae, and dub, with a speed garage bassline.

"Superstylin'" reached number 12 in the United Kingdom, number 37 in Italy, and the top 50 in Australia, Flanders, Ireland, and New Zealand. In the United States, the song reached number 40 on the Billboard Dance Club Play chart and was nominated for a Grammy for Best Dance Recording in 2003.

== Music video ==
The video starts with Groove Armada in their recording studio, and it later cuts to that same scene being viewed on a portable video/communication/tracking-like device (slightly resembling a modern day phone, a good ten to fifteen years before they became reality).

The video is being viewed on the device by two men, who are both individually dressed in different ragged, slightly scruffy, worn out clothing - and the impression given from their mannerisms and behaviour, give the viewer the impression that they are, more than likely, assumed to be aliens - and they are dragging a very large, oversized bass speaker with them, carrying it, pausing for breaks, but continuing onwards until reaching their desired destination.

They enter a building, where the title song is being performed live, by the band. They proceed to set the speaker up to the PA system, increasing the volume, and the bass kicks in, and as they do this it becomes apparent it is also causing other weird, unearthly occurrences to happen around them and in the rest of the building. Including things like the band's logo appearing on an arcade machine at the end of the video.

The two men portraying the 'aliens' in the video are played by British actors James Holmes, as the shorter of the two, and Andrew Powell as the taller one wearing a hat. The band also appear, performing the song.

== Track listings ==
UK CD and cassette single; Australian CD single

1. "Superstylin'" (G.A. 7-inch edit) – 3:43
2. "Superstylin'" (G.A. Disktek mix) – 5:45
3. "Tuning In" (dub mix) – 4:45

UK 12-inch single

A1. "Superstylin'" (original mix) – 6:36
B1. "Superstylin'" (G.A. Disktek mix) – 5:45
B2. "Tuning In" (dub mix) – 4:45

European CD single

1. "Superstylin'" (G.A. 7-inch edit) – 3:43
2. "Superstylin'" (G.A. Disktek mix) – 5:45

US CD single

1. "Superstylin'" (G.A. radio edit)
2. "Superstylin'" (G.A. Disktek mix)
3. "Superstylin'" (Eddie Amador dub mix)
4. "Tuning In" (dub mix)

US 12-inch single

A1. "Superstylin'" (album version) – 6:06
A2. "Superstylin'" (Groove Armada Disktek mix) – 5:45
B1. "Superstylin'" (Eddie Amador's Hollywood Beat dub) – 8:02

== Credits and personnel ==
Credits are taken from the Goodbye Country (Hello Nightclub) album booklet.

Studio

- Edited and mastered at Transfermation (London, England)

Personnel

- Groove Armada – production
  - Andy Cato – writing
  - Tom Findlay – writing
- M.A.D. – writing (as Michael Anthony Daniel), vocals
- Daniel White – writing
- Keeling Lee – writing, guitars
- M.G. – vocals
- Jonathan White – bass
- Patrick Dawes – percussion
- Hornography – horns
- Dominic Glover – trumpet, arrangement
- Matt Colman – trombone
- Mike Smith – saxophone
- Dave Pemberton – mix engineering
- Richard Dowling – editing
- Noel Summerville – mastering

== Charts ==
Chart (2001)	Peak position
Australia (ARIA)	49
Belgium (Ultratop 50 Flanders)	48
Belgium (Ultratip Bubbling Under Wallonia)	18
Europe (Eurochart Hot 100)	52
Ireland (IRMA)	41
Ireland Dance (IRMA)	5
Italy (FIMI)	37
Netherlands (Single Top 100)	82
New Zealand (Recorded Music NZ)	43
Scottish Singles Sales (Official Charts)	18
UK Singles (Official Charts)	12
UK Dance (Official Charts)	1
UK Indie (Official Charts)	1
US Dance Club Songs (Billboard)	40

== Certifications ==
Region	Certification	Certified units/sales
New Zealand (RMNZ)	2× Platinum	60,000^{‡}
^{‡} Sales+streaming figures based on certification alone.

== Release history ==
Region	Date	Format(s)	Label(s)	Ref.
United Kingdom	13 August 2001	12-inch vinyl; CD; cassette	Pepper; Jive Electro	
Australia	20 August 2001	CD	Jive Electro	
Australia	3 September 2001	12-inch vinyl	Jive Electro	
