= I See You Baby =

1999 single by Groove Armada

Single by Groove Armada featuring Gram'ma Funk

from the album Vertigo
- Released: November 1999; 20 September 2004 (remix)
- Genre: Big beat (Fatboy Slim remix)
- Length: 4:40; 4:05 (remix)
- Label: Jive Electro; BMG (remix)
- Songwriters: Tom Findlay; Andy Cato; Toi Sacchi
- Producer: Groove Armada

Groove Armada singles chronology
"At the River" (1997)	"I See You Baby" (1999)	"Superstylin'" (2001)

"I See You Baby" is a song by British duo Groove Armada, featuring Gram'ma Funk on vocals. The song was later remixed by Fatboy Slim, with this latter version appearing in airplay. It was also remixed by Futureshock.

The Fatboy Slim remix featured extensively in a Renault Megane television advertising campaign in the United Kingdom in 2003. The Futureshock dance version is used as the theme for the show MTV Cribs since 2000.

Although the single peaked at number 17 on the UK Singles Chart upon its original release in November 1999, it became very popular due to its inclusion on its parent album Vertigo, and various dance compilations. A reissue of the song on the compilation album The Best of Groove Armada saw it reach a new peak of number 11 on the chart almost five years later on 20 September 2004.

== Critical reception ==
David Stubbs from NME commented, "A fairly Spanish Armada this one, as, though the tide may have gone out on this year's festival of concrete and kit-off, there is a part of the English psyche that is forever Ibiza. A moderately salacious theme is set up by the worrying "I see you baby/Shaking that ass" refrain but the obligatory refusal of the tune to develop would seemingly confine the designated shaking to the gym and the stationary sweat of the travelator rather than anything more 'saucy'. Yes of course there's a Fatboy Slim remix. Are you mad?"

== Music videos ==
=== First version ===
The first version of the music video, in the vein of 20 Minute Workout, features women in an aerobics class in a white room, exercising to the song.

=== Fatboy Slim remix ===
The second version of the music video utilizes the Fatboy Slim remix and features a security guard, played by David Pires, watching women and some men stripping and dancing erotically in restrooms and in a nightclub. Towards the end of the video, the people become wise to the cameras and start angrily ripping them out. Panicked, the guard closes the laptops he is watching the cameras through, packs them away and flees the room, shutting off the lights on the way out.

== Charts ==
=== Weekly charts ===
Chart (1999–2000)	Peak position
Australia (ARIA)	11
Belgium (Ultratip Bubbling Under Flanders)	3
Canada Dance/Urban (RPM)	3
Europe (Eurochart Hot 100)	64
New Zealand (Recorded Music NZ)	20
Scottish Singles Sales (Official Charts)	23
UK Singles (Official Charts)	17
UK Dance (Official Charts)	6
UK Indie (Official Charts)	3
US Dance Club Songs (Billboard)	12
US Dance Singles Sales (Billboard)	6

Chart (2004)	Peak position
Ireland (IRMA)	16
Ireland Dance (IRMA)	2
Netherlands (Single Top 100)	92
Scottish Singles Sales (Official Charts)	8
UK Singles (Official Charts)	11
UK Dance (Official Charts)	3

=== Year-end charts ===
Chart (2000)	Position
Australia (ARIA)	97
US Maxi-Singles Sales (Billboard)	42

== Certifications ==
Region	Certification	Certified units/sales
Australia (ARIA)	Gold	35,000^{^}
New Zealand (RMNZ)	Gold	15,000^{‡}
United Kingdom (BPI)	Gold	400,000^{‡}
^{^} Shipments figures based on certification alone.^{‡} Sales+streaming figures based on certification alone.
