= But I Feel Good =

2003 song by Groove Armada

Single by Groove Armada

from the album Lovebox
- Released: 25 August 2003 (UK)
- Length: 5:18
- Songwriter(s): Andy Cato, Tom Findlay, Anthony Daniel
- Producer(s): Groove Armada

Groove Armada singles chronology
"Easy" (2003)	"But I Feel Good" (2003)	"I See You Baby" (2004)

"But I Feel Good" is a single by the English electronic music group Groove Armada, from their fourth album, Lovebox. Reaching position 50 in the UK Singles Chart, the song found later fame through use as the lead theme in the game Brian Lara International Cricket 2007 (PC, Xbox 360); and through an advertising campaign for Mars and Snickers chocolate bars in Australia and was also used in a promo for Disney Channel in the mid 2000s. The song was also featured in the credits to the 2004 film Wimbledon.

== Charts ==
Chart (2003)	Position
UK Dance (OCC)	1
UK Singles (OCC)	50
