= Northern Star (Groove Armada album) =

Studio album by Groove Armada
- Released: 9 March 1998
- Recorded: 1996–1997
- Genre: Ambient house; funk
- Length: 66:43
- Label: Tummy Touch

Groove Armada chronology
Northern Star (1998)	Vertigo (1999)

Northern Star is the debut album by English electronic music duo Groove Armada. It was released in March 1998 by record label Tummy Touch.

== Reception ==
Professional ratings
Review scores
Source	Rating
AllMusic	2.5/5 stars
The Daily Telegraph	5/5 stars
The Guardian	3/5 stars
NME	6/10

Critical response to the album has been mixed. Stephen Dalton of NME called it "an oddly schizoid mix of trendy beats and old-skool snoozerama".

== Track listing ==
No.	Title	Length
1.	"Dr Eiff"	5:49
2.	"Capt. Sensual (Remix)"	5:21
3.	"Entrance to Zanzibar"	5:59
4.	"At the River" (replaced on the re-issue by "Fireside Favourite" – 4:26)	6:33
5.	"Dirty Listening"	5:24
6.	"M 2 Many"	6:14
7.	"Dan Solo" (album edit)	7:33
8.	"Pressure Breakdown"	6:12
9.	"What Have We Become?"	5:51
10.	"Jeanneret's Groove"	6:59
11.	"Pillar 13"	4:49
12.	"Bonus Stitch 1 & 2" (not on re-issue)	2:08

2007 re-issue iTunes bonus tracks
No.	Title	Length
13.	"Black Sheep"	5:05
14.	"Wholemeal"	5:22
