= Edge of the Horizon =

Studio album by Groove Armada
- Released: October 2, 2020
- Genre: Yacht rock Italodisco
- Length: 47:27
- Label: BMG
- Producer: Andy Cato; Tom Findlay

Groove Armada chronology
Little Black Book (2015)	Edge of the Horizon (2020)

Professional ratings
Review scores
Source	Rating
AllMusic	3.5/5 stars
The Arts Desk	1/5 stars
The Line of Best Fit	7.5/10
MusicOMH	3/5 stars
Spectrum Culture	3/5 stars
Under the Radar	6/10 stars
The Times	4/5 stars
The Upcoming	4/5 stars

Edge of the Horizon is the ninth studio album by British electronic music duo Groove Armada, released on October 2, 2020, on the BMG Rights Management record label.

== Track listing ==
All tracks are written by Tom Findlay and Andy Cato.

No.	Title	Length
1.	"Get Out on the Dancefloor" (featuring Nick Littlemore)	4:43
2.	"Holding Strong" (featuring James Alexander Bright)	4:23
3.	"Tripwire" (featuring Nick Littlemore)	3:53
4.	"Don't Give Up"	3:49
5.	"We're Free" (featuring Roseau)	4:21
6.	"Edge of the Horizon" (featuring She Keeps Bees)	5:05
7.	"Lover 4 Now" (featuring Todd Edwards)	4:29
8.	"I Can Only Miss You" (featuring Paris Brightledge)	4:07
9.	"What Cha Gonna Do with Your Love"	4:20
10.	"Talk Talk" (featuring James Alexander Bright)	4:27
11.	"Dance Our Hurt Away" (featuring Paris Brightledge)	3:46
Total length:		47:27
