= Lovebox (Groove Armada album) =

Studio album by Groove Armada
- Released: 18 November 2002
- Genre: Electronica
- Length: 57:49; 62:55 (UK release)
- Label: Jive Electro

Groove Armada chronology
Goodbye Country (Hello Nightclub) (2001)	Lovebox (2002)	The Best of Groove Armada (2004)

Singles from Lovebox
- 1. "Purple Haze" Released: 21 October 2002; 2. "Final Shakedown" Released: 17 December 2002; 3. "Easy" Released: 5 May 2003; 4. "But I Feel Good" Released: 25 August 2003

Professional ratings
Aggregate scores
Source	Rating
Metacritic	69/100
Review scores
Source	Rating
AllMusic	2.5/5 stars
Alternative Press	4/5 stars
Blender	2/5 stars
E! Online	B
Entertainment Weekly	A−
Mojo	4/5 stars
Q	2/5 stars
Resident Advisor	4.5/5 stars
Rolling Stone	4/5 stars
Uncut	3/5 stars

Lovebox is the fourth studio album by the English electronic dance music duo Groove Armada, released on 18 November 2002 by Jive Electro.

== Track listing ==
1. "Purple Haze" (Andy Cato, Tom Findlay, Bob Young, Brian Scott, Francis Rossi, Melvin Adams, Ronald Wilson, Wallace Wilson, William Hughes) – 4:04
2. "Groove Is On" (Andy Cato, Tom Findlay, Delano Ogbourne) – 4:18
3. "Remember" (Andy Cato, Tom Findlay, Sandy Denny) – 5:31
4. "Madder" (Andy Cato, Tom Findlay, Jonathan White, Keeling Lee, Clive Jenner, Michael Daniel) – 5:22
5. "Think Twice" (Andy Cato, Tom Findlay, Cameron McVey, Neneh Cherry) – 5:59
6. "Final Shakedown" (Andy Cato, Tom Findlay, Wallace Wilson) – 6:10
7. "Be Careful What You Say" (UK bonus track) (Andy Cato, Tom Findlay) – 5:06
8. "Hands of Time" (Andy Cato, Tom Findlay, Richie Havens) – 4:22
9. "Tuning In" (Andy Cato, Tom Findlay, Jonathan White, Keeling Lee, Clive Jenner, Tim Hutton) – 5:12
10. "Easy" (Andy Cato, Tom Findlay, Jean-Marc Cérrone, Don Ray, Sunshine Anderson) – 5:52
11. "Lovebox" (Andy Cato, Tom Findlay) – 5:41
12. "But I Feel Good" (Andy Cato, Tom Findlay, Anthony Daniel) – 5:18
13. "Think Twice" (Tiefschwarz Remix) (Asian bonus track) (Andy Cato, Tom Findlay)

Bonus disc

1. "Chicago" (live at Brixton 2002)
2. "I See You Baby" (Fatboy Slim Remix)
3. "Suntoucher" (Nextmen Submarine Remix)
4. "Easy" (GA's Shake Shake Remix)
5. "Fairport 2"
6. "But I Feel Good" (Audio Bullys Dr. Feelgood Mix)

== Personnel ==
=== Groove Armada ===
- Andy Cato – keyboards, drum programming, trombone, guitars, production
- Tom Findlay – keyboards, production

=== Additional musicians ===
- Keeling Lee – guitar ("Purple Haze", "Madder", "Groove Is On", "Tuning In")
- Jonathan White – bass ("Purple Haze", "Madder", "Tuning In")
- Clive Jenner – drums ("Purple Haze", "Madder", "Tuning In")
- Patrick Dawes – percussion ("Purple Haze", "Madder", "Tuning In")
- Tim Hutton – vocals ("Tuning In")
- Sunshine Anderson – vocals ("Easy")
- Neneh Cherry – vocals ("Think Twice", "Groove Is On")
- Wallace 'Red Rat' Wilson – vocals ("Purple Haze", "The Final Shakedown")
- Richie Havens – vocals ("Hands of Time")
- Nappy Roots – rap ("Purple Haze")
- Michael "M.A.D" Daniel – rap ("Madder", "But I Feel Good")
- Delano Ogbourne – rap ("Groove Is On")

== Charts ==
Chart (2002)	Peak position
Australian Albums (ARIA)	15
Austrian Albums (Ö3 Austria)	69
Belgian Albums (Ultratop Wallonia)	46
Dutch Albums (Album Top 100)	100
French Albums (SNEP)	123
Irish Albums (IRMA)	65
Italian Albums (FIMI)	27
New Zealand Albums (RMNZ)	21
Scottish Albums (OCC)	40
Swiss Albums (Schweizer Hitparade)	70
UK Albums (OCC)	41
UK Independent Albums (OCC)	4
US Top Dance Albums (Billboard)	3
Chart (2018)	Peak position
UK Dance Albums (OCC)	18

== Certifications ==
Region	Certification	Certified units/sales
Australia (ARIA)	Gold	35,000^{^}
New Zealand (RMNZ)	Gold	7,500^{^}
United Kingdom (BPI)	Silver	60,000^{^}
^{^} Shipments figures based on certification alone.
