= Purple Haze (Groove Armada song) =

2002 single by Groove Armada

Single by Groove Armada

from the album Lovebox
- Released: 21 October 2002
- Length: 4:04
- Label: Pepper
- Songwriters: Andy Cato; Tom Findlay; Wallace Wilson; William Hughes; Melvin Adams; Ronald Wilson; Brian Scott; Francis Rossi; Bob Young
- Producer: Groove Armada

Groove Armada singles chronology
"My Friend" (2001)	"Purple Haze" (2002)	"Easy" (2003)

Music video
- "Purple Haze" on YouTube

"Purple Haze" is a song by English electronic music duo Groove Armada, taken from their fourth studio album, Lovebox (2002). The song contains elements from "April, Spring, Summers and Wednesdays", performed by English rock band Status Quo. Released on 21 October 2002, "Purple Haze" reached number 36 on the UK Singles Chart and number 38 in Italy.

== Personnel ==
Groove Armada

- Andy Cato – production, mixing, keyboards, guitar
- Tom Findlay – production, mixing, keyboards

Additional musicians

- Wallace 'Red Rat' Wilson – vocals
- Nappy Roots – raps
- Keeling Lee – guitar
- Jonathan White – bass
- Clive Jenner – drums
- Patrick Dawes – percussion

== Charts ==
Chart (2002)	Peak position
Italy (FIMI)	38
Scotland Singles (OCC)	39
UK Singles (OCC)	36
UK Dance (OCC)	2
UK Indie (OCC)	3
