= Saint Saviour (musician) =

English musician

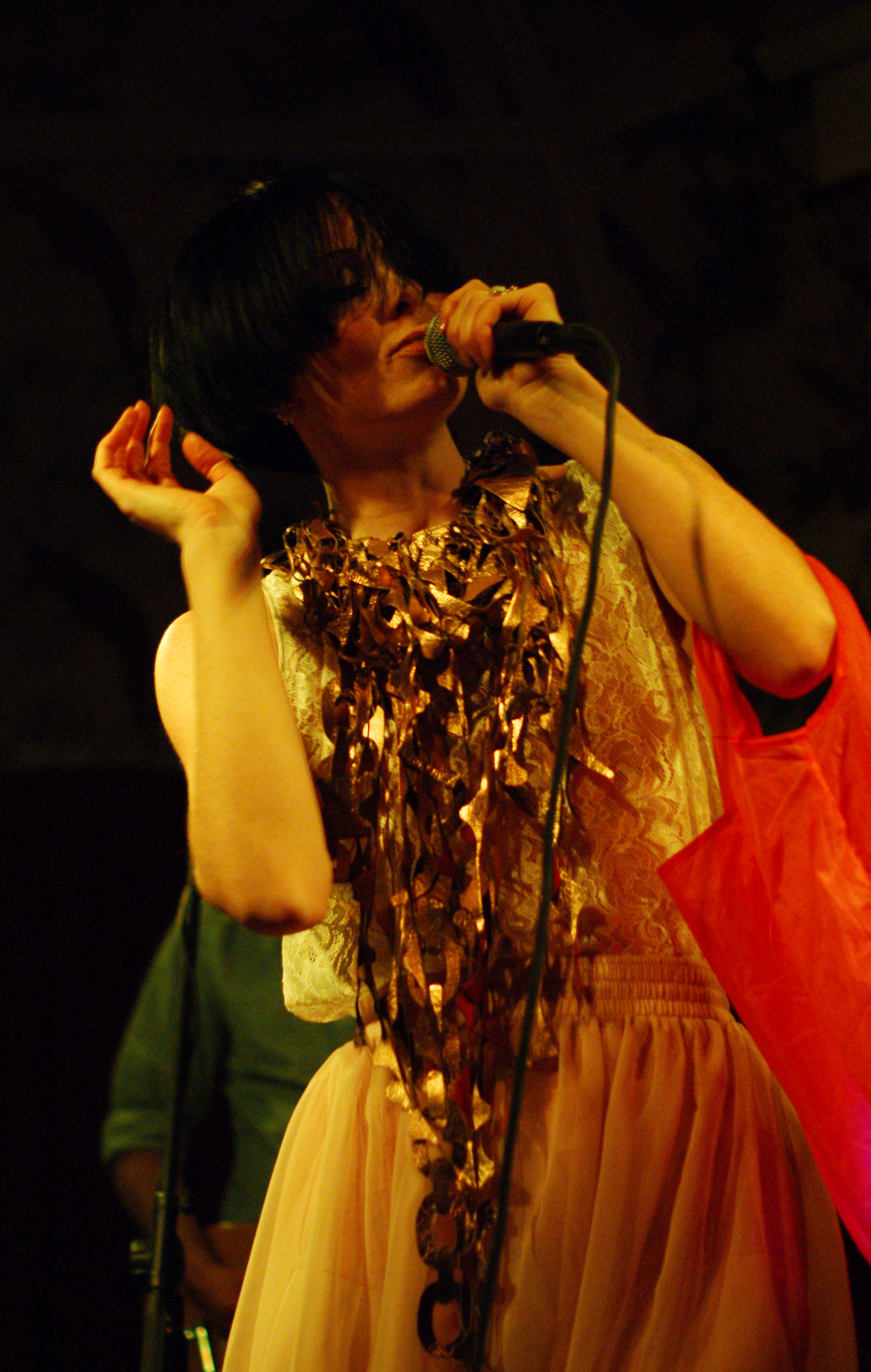
- Saint Saviour performing in 2011

Background information
- Born: Rebecca Jones; 2 April 1983; Stockton-on-Tees, England
- Genre: Alternative rock
- Occupations: Singer, songwriter
- Instrument: Vocals
- Years active: 2007–present
- Labels: Bang The Box, PID, Surface Area
- Website: saintsaviour.co.uk

Becky Jones (born 2 April 1983), better known as Saint Saviour, is an English musician from Stockton-on-Tees. Formerly of the electro band The RGBs, she toured with Groove Armada as their lead singer between 2009 and 2012, while also producing her own solo music as Saint Saviour from 2010. After releasing two EPs, her debut album Union came out in June 2012. Her song "This Ain't No Hymn" then appeared in the 2012 trailer for the film Miss Bala.

Saint Saviour's second solo album In the Seams was released on 3 November 2014. The album was produced by fellow Northern English singer-songwriter Bill Ryder-Jones and features the Manchester Camerata Orchestra.

== History ==
As she writes on her official website, "I've been hanging about the periphery of music for a few years now, mainly collaborating with electronic producers, writing really positive, upbeat pop/dance tunes." Originally from Stockton-on-Tees, she moved to London in 2003. She adopted the name 'Saint Saviour' after seeing it regularly while running in the St Saviour's Dock area of London. She was lead singer in the RGBs, who toured with Groove Armada, before joining the latter. In 2010, Saint Saviour provided a vocal collaboration for Groove Armada's song "Paper Romance" on their album Black Light, and toured as the band's singer.

She subsequently launched her career as a solo artist, supporting Hurts on tour, in 2010 and releasing two EPs (Anatomy and Suukei). She has since released a first album Union; a second album In the Seams in November 2014 which sees Saint Saviour take a more honest and personal approach to songwriting with a stripped back sound and strings played by the Manchester Camerata Orchestra, and her third album, Tomorrow Again, released on 4 September 2020.

She released her fourth album, Sunseeker, on 22 March 2024.

Her voice has drawn comparisons with Kate Bush, Elizabeth Fraser, and Sinéad O'Connor.

She is also the head of songwriting at Tech Music School in London.

== Discography ==
=== Studio albums ===
List of album, showing year released and chart placement
Year	Album details	Peak chart positions										
Year	Album details	UK	AUT	BEL (FLA)	BEL (WAL)	FRA	IRL	NL	SWE	SWI	ITA	GRE
2012	Union: Release date: 24 June 2012; Label: PID; Formats: LP, CD, Digital Download	199	–	–	–	–	–	–	–	–	–	–
2014	In the Seams: Release date: 3 November 2014; Label: Surface Area; Formats: LP, CD, Digital Download	160	–	–	–	–	–	–	–	–	–	–
2020	Tomorrow Again: Release date: 4 September 2020; Label: VLF Records; Format: Digital Download, LP	–	–	–	–	–	–	–	–	–	–	–

=== EPs ===
Year	Title
2011	Anatomy: Released: 28 March 2011
2011	Suukei: Released: 21 November 2011

=== Singles ===
- "Love Will Tear Us Apart" (2008), Bang The Box
- "Woman Scorned" (2010), Euphonios
