= Tim Lee (musician) =

English musician

Tim Lee, also known as Tim 'Love' Lee (born January 1970, Cambridge, England) is an English musician, record producer and DJ. He is the founder of Tummy Touch Records. He is most notable as a pioneer of electronic dance music and trip hop, his debut album having been among Fact magazine's 50 best trip hop albums of all time. Since the mid-1990s Lee has released six artist albums, two compilations, twenty seven singles and three commercially available DJ mix albums. He has produced over seventy remixes for other artists. He currently resides in Brooklyn, New York City.

== Biography ==
In 1989, Lee studied music in Nottingham, having developed his passion for music on the local band scene in Cambridge. After earning his bachelor's degree he joined Katrina and the Waves for two years playing Hammond organ. Lee appeared on their album Pet the Tiger (Virgin, 1991). In August 1994, Lee started his first record label, Peace Feast.

In 1996, Lee started Tummy Touch Records, who have released music by Groove Armada, Little Barrie, Beardyman and Steve Arrington. In 1997, Lee released his first album, Confessions of a Selector.

Tim Lee's DJ skills have seen him host radio shows for Kiss FM, BBC Radio 6 Music, KEXP-FM and NYC's East Village Radio.

Lee has been invited to lecture and sit on panels for events organized by The Red Bull Music Academy (in Florida and Dublin), Diesel (in London and New York), The Musicians' Union (in London), The UK Dept. of Trade & Industry (in Austin, Texas for SXSW), The British Council (in London) and others.

Lee is music co-director of the arts organization The Wassaic Project.

== Discography ==
=== Albums ===
- Tim 'Love' Lee – Confessions of a Selector (TUCH007, 1997)
- Tim 'Love' Lee – Just Call Me Lone Lee (TUCH040, 2000)
- Tim 'Love' Lee – Against Nature (TUCH114, 2005)

=== Mix albums ===
- Various artists – It's All Good (K7, 2003)
- Various artists – Coming Home (Stereo Deluxe, 2007)
- Various artists – The Trip (Universal Import, 2004)
