= White Light (Groove Armada album) =

Studio album by Groove Armada
- Released: 18 October 2010
- Recorded: 2010
- Length: 44:43
- Label: Cooking Vinyl
- Producer: Groove Armada

Groove Armada chronology
| Black Light (2010) | White Light (2010) | Little Black Book (2015) |

Professional ratings
Review scores
| Source | Rating |
|---|---|
| AllMusic | 3/5 stars |

White Light is the seventh studio album by the British electronic music duo Groove Armada, released on 18 October 2010 through Cooking Vinyl. It consists of alternative versions of songs from their previous album, Black Light, along with one new song entitled "1980".

== Background ==
Groove Armada members Andy Cato and Tom Findlay reworked the songs for the Jersey Live music festival. According to Findlay when talking about the album:

"It began as Black Light. Then it was recut, reworked and enlarged for a festival season that began at Glastonbury, crossed Europe, took in Japan, and ended in Moscow. Now these king size live versions have been taken back to the studio and re-recorded. Black Light has become White Light."

== Track listing ==
White Light track listing
| No. | Title | Composers | Length |
|---|---|---|---|
| 1. | "Warsaw" | Cato, Findlay, Littlemore | 5:45 |
| 2. | "Time & Space" | Cato, Findlay, Larrabee | 5:12 |
| 3. | "History" | Cato, Findlay, Young | 5:37 |
| 4. | "Not Forgotten" | Cato, Findlay, Littlemore | 4:53 |
| 5. | "I Won't Kneel" | Cato, Findlay | 4:58 |
| 6. | "Look Me in the Eye Sister" | Cato, Findlay, Larrabee | 5:30 |
| 7. | "Paper Romance" | Cato, Duffy, Findlay | 6:58 |
| 8. | "1980" | Cato, Findlay | 4:08 |
| 9. | "History" (Love Mix) | Cato, Findlay, Young | 3:42 |
| Total length: | | | 44:43 |

== Charts ==
Chart performance for White Light
| Chart (2010) | Peak position |
|---|---|
| UK Albums (OCC) | 111 |
