= Tummy Touch Records =

British record label

- Founded: 1996
- Founder: Tim 'Love' Lee
- Genre: Electronic, trip hop, house, ambient, downtempo, indie pop
- Country of origin: United Kingdom, United States
- Location: London & New York City
- Official website: Official website

Tummy Touch Records is a record label with offices in London, UK and New York City, USA best known for releasing quirky dance and downtempo music. Artists on Tummy Touch include Groove Armada, Patrick & Eugene, Niyi, Tutto Matto, Tom Vek, and label founder Tim Lee.

== Tummy Touch Music Group ==
Tummy Touch Records is a part of the Tummy Touch Music Group (TTMG). TTMG does production, publishing, licensing, and manages a stock music library in association with KPM Musichouse for commercial uses called Tummy Touch Moods.

TTMG oversees the publishing rights to the Katrina and the Waves music catalog which includes the hit "Walking on Sunshine".

Tummy Touch Music Group also works with RAK Records publishing division to put out new and re-released material from the RAK catalog.

== History ==
Tummy Touch was founded 1996 in the UK by Tim Lee aka Tim 'Love' Lee. Their first release was "The Nightlife EP" – by Stop / E.D.O. (MBTT 001). Groove Armada had their first 12" vinyl release on Tummy Touch in 1997 with "Captain Sensual" (MBTT 003) and "At the River" (TUCH011), which hit 19 on the UK singles chart. Groove Armada's first album Northern Star (TUCH 103) also came out on Tummy Touch on 9 March 1998. The label uses Bandcamp extensively to distribute mainly sampler anthologies of its artists.
