= TuneTribe =

Digital music download store

- Launch date: July 2005; 20 years ago
- Discontinued: Yes
- Pricing model: variable
- Website: www.tunetribe.com

TuneTribe was a digital music download store that offers content from major record labels, independents and unsigned artists. It is unknown when the site became defunct.

== Availability ==
The total number of tracks available on TuneTribe exceeded 3 million, all of which were in MP3 format. Also, a boutique physical store existed selling limited edition CDs, books and high-end music related products, complementing their digital offering.

Music and artist recommendations on products and artist pages were provided by Last.FM, with TuneTribe recommending Record Union (https://www.recordunion.com) to unsigned acts that wish to sell their music on the site.

== Digital Platforms ==
TuneTribe's sister company, TuneTribe Digital, was a digital music service provider that builds and hosts digital platforms for a variety of brands across all the industries, utilizing the most important component - music. The company offered services that included digital downloads, streaming, competitions, prerelease promotions and vouchers.

== Founding and Ownership ==
Launched in 2005, TuneTribe was founded by Tom Findlay of Groove Armada and John Strickland of Interesource. It was owned by William Haighton, an entrepreneur and director of BGS Holdings Ltd and GMW Entertainment Ltd in the UK. From 1995 to 2002 Haighton was a director of both SENA and NVPI, the Dutch equivalents respectively of the UK recording industry bodies, the PRS (the Performing Rights Society) and the BPI (the British Phonographic Industry).
