= Pepper Records =

British record label

Pepper Records was a record label and subsidiary of Jive Records. It featured artists like Shanks & Bigfoot and Steps, but has been largely inactive since 2004 after being integrated into major label structures.

== See also ==
- Lists of record labels
