= Jive Electro =

- Parent company: Jive
- Founded: 1984
- Founder: Clive Calder, Ralph Simon
- Status: Inactive
- Distributor: BMG (until 2004)
- Genre: Various
- Country of origin: United States
- Location: New York City

Jive Electro was a sublabel of the Zomba Group's Jive Records noted for releasing albums by Groove Armada, Hardknox, and Tangerine Dream as well as few remixes for the Madchester band the Stone Roses.

The label was largely active between 1984 and 1987. Jive resurrected it in the 1998 to accommodate a boom in electronic music, but it appears to be inactive since Zomba and Jive were integrated into a major label structure in 2004.

== See also ==
- List of record labels
