= Groove Armada =

British electronic music duo

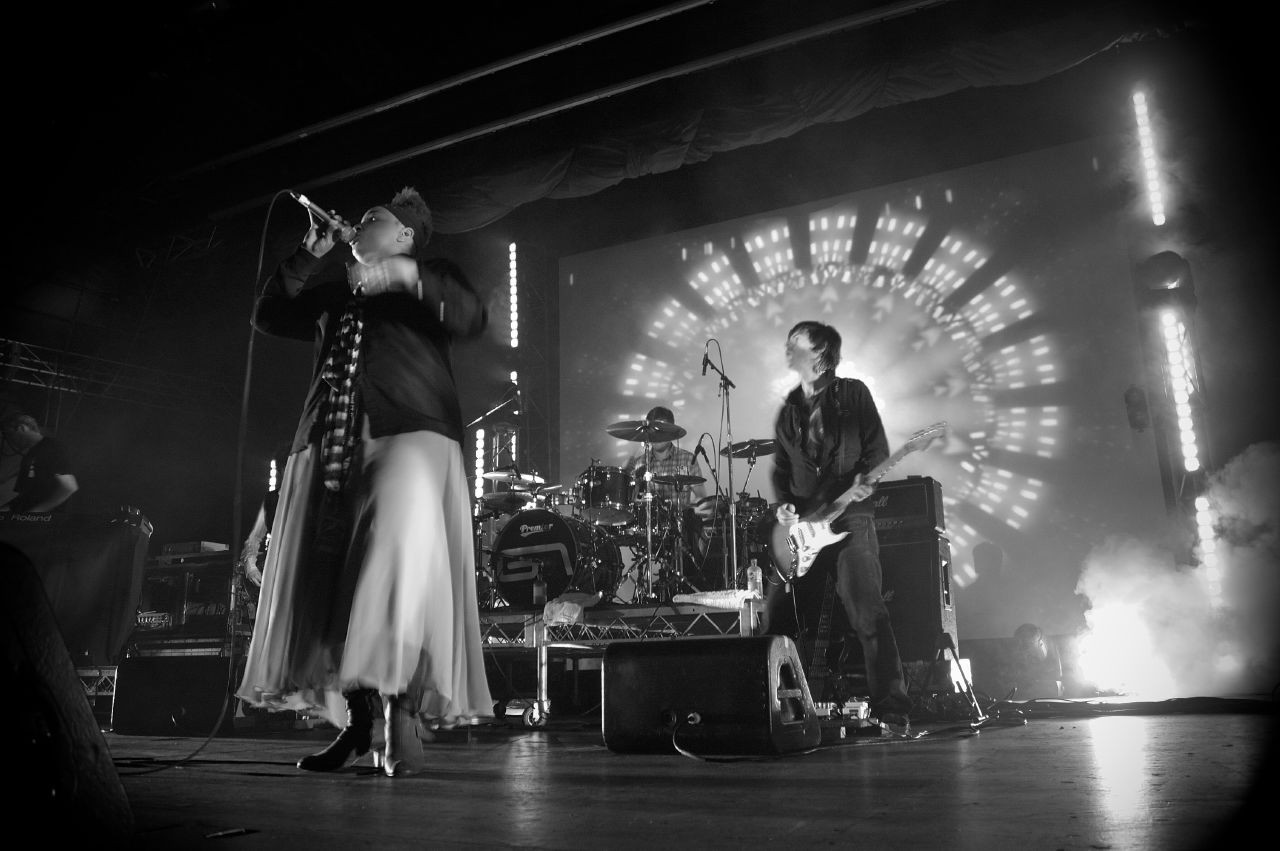
- Groove Armada performing in 2007

Background information
- Origin: London, England
- Genres: Big beat; electronic; nu-funk; trip hop; house; downtempo
- Years active: 1996–present
- Labels: Columbia; Cooking Vinyl; Jive Electro; BMG
- Members: Andy Cato; Tom Findlay
- Website: groovearmada.com

Groove Armada are an English electronic music duo, composed of Andy Cato and Tom Findlay. They achieved chart success with their singles "At the River", "I See You Baby" and "Superstylin'". The duo have released nine studio albums, six of which have charted in the UK Albums Chart top 50.

== History ==
Groove Armada formed after Cato and Findlay had been introduced by a mutual friend and soon started their own club night in London, called Captain Sensual at the Helm of the Groove Armada, after a 1970s discothèque.

By 1997, they had released a few singles, including "4 Tune Cookie" and the song that first brought them minor fame, "At the River", which sampled "Old Cape Cod" by Patti Page. The song went on to be one of Groove Armada's best-known tracks and has been found on multiple chill out compilations.

Their first album, Northern Star, was released in 1998 on Tummy Touch Records, and was followed by a second, Vertigo, in 1999, which had a more mainstream and 'polished' sound, making the UK Album Chart's upper 20 and being certified silver in the UK. It also included “I See You Baby” and "At the River" which was re-released as a full-fledged single. An album of remixed tracks from Vertigo entitled The Remixes followed in 2000, along with their contribution to the Back to Mine mix album series.

The next studio album Goodbye Country (Hello Nightclub) was released in 2001 and marked a departure from their trip-hop roots to more upbeat music – as demonstrated on the Grammy-nominated single "Superstylin'". Another mix album followed, this time for the Another Late Night series, and in 2002, less than a year after Goodbye Country (Hello Nightclub), Groove Armada produced Lovebox, which included a variety of genres including rock, such as "Madder" and "Purple Haze", while others were closer to the band's traditional house and trip hop roots, such as the title track "Lovebox", and "Remember", with the latter containing vocals made up entirely of samples of Sandy Denny's vocals for Fairport Convention. An additional bonus track was later released on their website entitled "Fairport". Lovebox also contained a song called "Hands of Time" which was subsequently used in the 2004 film Collateral.

A greatest hits album, entitled The Best of Groove Armada, released in 2004 – the last of their releases with Pepper Records – before their studio album Soundboy Rock was released in 2007. The album marked a notable departure from the multi-genre-influenced previous album, featuring tracks such as "Get Down" and "Groove Extracts", which followed the contemporary house music trend, tracks with rock elements, and "Song 4 Mutya (Out of Control)" featuring the vocals of ex-Sugababes singer Mutya Buena, hailed by online music guide Popjustice as one of the best songs of 2007.

Following the successful Soundboy Rock singles, an updated best-of set titled Greatest Hits was released in October 2007. This was accompanied by GA10: 10 Year Story, a 2CD rarities collection released in November 2007 to celebrate their tenth anniversary as a band. The band has spoken in-depth about the compilation, and cited it as an "emotional experience", with both members selecting their personal favourite songs and mixes from their history.

Groove Armada also released a collaboration with The Japanese Popstars through Strictly Rhythm, via Beatport, in April 2008.

In the same year, Groove Armada engaged in a deal with Bacardi to distribute their new 4-track EP using a file sharing platform called B-Live Share.

During 2009, Findlay and Cato repeatedly confirmed the existence of a pending new album. While on the Bacardi Express tour in Australia, Findlay said it would be called Black Light and "is going to be the darker side of Groove Armada, which is finally coming out after 12 years." The first single, released on 23 November 2009, was "I Won't Kneel", featuring Groove Armada's new vocalist, Saint Saviour. The album's second single, "Paper Romance", was released on 22 February 2010, and the album was released in Europe on 28 February.

In October 2010, Groove Armada released a remix album, White Light, which contained recent studio re-recordings of alternative live versions of a number of songs from Black Light as well as other classic Groove Armada songs. Groove Armada headlined Uber Cool festival at Jersey Live on 3 September. The duo embarked on a series of secretive "living room" sets, performing intimately across the country for audiences of close friends. Little information was given about these private performances, but the tour kicked off in Brighton in late January, 2011.

The group has collaborated with a diverse array of artists, including Max Taylor, Neneh Cherry, DJ Gramma Funk, Sophie Barker, Nappy Roots, Fudge Dog, Sunshine Anderson, Mutya Buena, Jeru the Damaja, Richie Havens, Will Young, Brodanse and Joel Culpepper.

In February 2014, the EP Pork Soda was released. It included three brand new tracks: "Pork Soda", "Hyde & Freak" and "Jack in Black".

In 2015, Groove Armada released their eighth studio album, Little Black Book. The album has been described as "somewhere between [an] album, mix CD, and compilation". The first disc features their own original music and remixes, while the second disc features remixes of their music by other artists.

Groove Armada released their ninth studio album Edge of the Horizon in 2020 featuring vocal performances from Nick Littlemore, James Alexander Bright, Todd Edwards, She Keeps Bees, Roseau, Paris Brightledge.

The duo played their last ever concerts in Australia and New Zealand in 2022.

In 2025, PinkPantheress and Groove Armada collaborated on a remix of her song, “Stateside.”

== Other work ==
From 1995 to 2000, Andy Cato was part of the progressive house music projects Mother's Pride and Qattara, and produced solo efforts under the aliases Caia and Journeyman DJ. In 2002, Cato collaborated with Rachel Foster, producing the album Pursuit of Happiness under the name Weekend Players. He also co-wrote with Sophie Ellis-Bextor on her album Shoot from the Hip, and released his first solo single under his own name, "La Luna". Cato has also worked with Róisín Murphy on her album Overpowered, producing the singles "Let Me Know" and "You Know Me Better".

Tom Findlay makes up one half of Sugardaddy with Tim Hutton, and has collaborated with Keeling Lee. In 2005, he set up Tunetribe, a music download store. Findlay has described working with Prince as his dream collaboration. In 2007, Findlay released Watch the Ride, a continuous mix album containing tracks by various artists, including his own project, Sugardaddy.

In 2011, Cato became the first musician to compose a ringtone for a charity, WaveLength.

== Awards ==
Award	Year	Nominee(s)	Category	Result	Ref.
BT Digital Music Awards	2002	Themselves	Artist of the Year	Nominated	
BT Digital Music Awards	2002	Themselves	Best Dance/Urban Artist	Nominated	
BT Digital Music Awards	2002	Themselves	People's Choice Award	Nominated	
Brit Awards	2000	Themselves	British Breakthrough Act	Nominated	
Brit Awards	2003	Themselves	British Dance Act	Nominated	
Brit Awards	2004	Themselves	British Dance Act	Nominated	
Grammy Awards	2003	"Superstylin'"	Best Dance Recording	Nominated	
Grammy Awards	2004	"Easy"	Best Dance Recording	Nominated	
Grammy Awards	2011	Black Light	Best Dance/Electronic Album	Nominated	
UK Festival Awards	2006	Themselves	Best Dance Act	Nominated	
UK Festival Awards	2007	Themselves	Best Dance Act	Nominated	
UK Festival Awards	2008	Themselves	Best Dance Act	Nominated	

Year	Awards	Work	Category	Result
2000	Billboard Music Video Awards	"I See You Baby"	Dance Clip of the Year	Nominated
2000	Billboard Music Video Awards	"I See You Baby"	Best New Artist Clip (Dance)	Nominated
2007	Antville Music Video Awards	"Song 4 Mutya (Out of Control)" (with Mutya Buena)	Worst Video	Nominated
2008	UK Music Video Awards	"Get Down"	Best Dance Video	Nominated
2008	Popjustice £20 Music Prize	"Song 4 Mutya (Out of Control)" (with Mutya Buena)	Best British Pop Single	Nominated
2010	Popjustice £20 Music Prize	"I Won't Kneel"	Best British Pop Single	Nominated

== Discography ==
Studio albums

- Northern Star (1998)
- Vertigo (1999)
- Goodbye Country (Hello Nightclub) (2001)
- Lovebox (2002)
- Soundboy Rock (2007)
- Black Light (2010)
- White Light (2010)
- Little Black Book (2015)
- Edge of the Horizon (2020)
