= FabricLive.15 =

Compilation album by Nitin Sawhney
- Released: April 19, 2004
- Genre: Electronic music
- Label: Fabric
- Producer: Nitin Sawhney

Nitin Sawhney chronology
Human (2003)	FabricLive.15 (2004)	All Mixed Up (2004)

FabricLive chronology
FabricLive.14 (2004)	FabricLive.15 (2004)	FabricLive.16 (2004)

FabricLive.15 is a DJ mix compilation album by Nitin Sawhney, as part of the FabricLive Mix Series. It has received positive reviews from critics and achieved modest chart success.

== Reception ==
Editors at AllMusic rated this album 4 out of 5 stars, with critic Joshua Glazer writing "thank goodness for Fabriclive.15" for showcasing "an hour of sensual nu-jazz from the strongest names on the market". In Resident Advisor, Karl Palma characterized Sawhney's compilation as "Niting takes Fabriclive and gives it a distinguishable ethnic flavour while not straying far away from the Fabriclive philosophy - break beats, hip hop, drum'n'bass with elements of eclecticism prevalent throughout", with reference to volume 12 from Bugz in the Attic.

== Track listing ==
1. Koop – Relaxin' At Club F****n (Nitin Sawhney Edit) – Compost
2. Nitin Sawhney – Eastern Eyes (Seiji Remix) – V2
3. Nitin Sawhney – Homelands (Freeform Five Remix) – Outcaste
4. Nitin Sawhney – Homelands (Dzihan & Kamien Mix) – Outcaste
5. Tosca – Suzuki (Burnt Friedman/Nonplace Dub) – !K7
6. Marcos Valle – Valeu (4Hero Remix) – Far Out
7. Kabuki – Tempest (Atjazz Remix) – Irma
8. Nathan Haines – Long (4Hero Mix) – Chillifunk
9. 4Hero – We Who Are Not Others (Jazzanova Mix) – Talkin' Loud
10. Phuturistix – Bad Thoughts – Hospital
11. Darqwan – Three Note Blue – Hospital
12. Visionary Underground – Freedom – Nasha
13. Niraj Chag – The Wheel – Nasha
14. Ges-e & Visionary Underground – Militant24 – Nasha
15. Nitin Sawhney – Beyond Skin – Outcaste
16. Craig Armstrong – Hymn 2 feat. Photek – Virgin

== Chart performance ==
FabricLive.15 appeared on CMJ New Music Report's RPM chart of electronic music for the week ending May 11, 2004.
