= Overpowered (song) =

Single by Róisín Murphy

from the album Overpowered
- B-side: "Foolish"; "Sweet Nothings"
- Released: 9 July 2007
- Recorded: 2007
- Genre: Electropop
- Length: 5:08
- Label: EMI
- Songwriter(s): Róisín Murphy; Paul Dolby; Mike Patto
- Producer(s): Róisín Murphy; Seiji

Róisín Murphy singles chronology
| "Sow into You" (2005) | "Overpowered" (2007) | "Let Me Know" (2007) |

"Overpowered" is a song by Irish singer Róisín Murphy from her second studio album of the same name (2007). It was written by Murphy, Paul "Seiji" Dolby and Mike Patto, and produced by the former two. The song was released on 9 July 2007 as the album's lead single. "Overpowered" reached number 149 on the UK Singles Chart on downloads alone, as its physical formats were ineligible to chart.

== Single cover ==
The art director of the single was British graphic designer Scott King and the photographer was Jonathan de Villiers. Murphy is wearing a design by Viktor & Rolf on the cover.

== Critical reception ==
"Overpowered" was met with positive reviews from critics. Jax Spike of About.com described the song as "a perfect ode to melancholic memories that are sung with a seductive baby doll voice with lyrics like 'When I think that I am over you/I'm overpowered' right before a zigzagging electro beat comes into play." Heather Phares of AllMusic stated, "With its sleek beats, bubbling synths, and nagging chorus, 'Overpowered' closely resembles a state-of-the-art pop single, but the way Murphy sings of science and oxytocin over a heart-fluttering harp is unmistakably her."

BBC Music's Sonja D'Cruze referred to the song as "a heady electronic anthem which tells the tale of getting consumed by the lust for an ex-lover, complete with a squelchy bassline and the minimalism of Casio kickdrums which are all secretly lifted by gentle harp and spacey synths. It's an irresistible match of loved-up disco-pop which has a crafty reworking of TIGA's 'I Wear My Sunglasses At Night', immediately making it a new classic." Mike Barnes from musicOMH called the song "an unrelenting electro-pop gem that penetrates your skull faster than a high-velocity nail gun." Pitchfork placed "Overpowered" at number 69 on its list of the Top 100 Tracks of 2007, further commenting, "Arty and smartly seductive, 'Overpowered' is a sublime reminder of the glory days of New Pop."

== Music video ==
The music video for "Overpowered" was directed by Jamie Thraves and shows Murphy walking home at night after performing a gig. On her way home, she is seen catching a Leyland Titan bus, buying food from a kebab shop and witnessing a police chase. Upon arriving home, she drinks water in the kitchen, removes clothes from the washing machine, brushes her teeth and ultimately goes to bed. Throughout the video, Murphy wears a Gareth Pugh Spring/Summer 2007 black and white-chequered outfit; Kylie Minogue would wear the same piece in her "In My Arms" video the following year.

== Track listings ==
- UK CD single
1. "Overpowered" – 5:09
2. "Foolish" – 3:28
3. "Sweet Nothings" – 3:45
4. "Overpowered" (Seamus Haji Remix) – 8:07
5. "Overpowered" (Kris Menace Remix) – 5:09
6. "Overpowered" (video) – 4:04
- UK 12" single

A1. "Overpowered" – 5:09
A2. "Foolish" – 3:28
A3. "Overpowered" (Kris Menace Remix) – 5:09
B1. "Overpowered" (Seamus Haji Remix) – 8:07
B2. "Overpowered" (Herve Remix)

- Digital single
1. "Overpowered" (Radio Edit) – 3:44
- Digital EP 1
1. "Overpowered" – 5:09
2. "Foolish" – 3:28
3. "Sweet Nothings" – 3:43
- Digital EP 2
1. "Overpowered" – 5:08
2. "Overpowered" (Loose Cannons Mix) – 4:32
3. "Overpowered" (Kris Menace Remix) – 5:11
4. "Overpowered" (Seamus Haji Remix) – 8:08
5. "Overpowered" (Herve and Róisín in the Secret Garden Mix) – 5:27
- Digital EP 3
1. "Overpowered" – 5:09
2. "Overpowered" (Kris Menace Remix) – 5:09
3. "Overpowered" (Seamus Haji Remix) – 8:07
4. "Overpowered" (Herve and Róisín in the Secret Garden Mix) – 5:26

== Credits and personnel ==
Credits adapted from the liner notes of the CD single.

- Róisín Murphy – vocals, production, songwriting
- Tom Elmhirst – mixing
- Scott King – art direction, design
- Dave Okumu – guitar
- Mike Patto – keyboards, songwriting
- Seiji – drums, keyboards, production, songwriting
- Jonathan de Villiers – photography

== Charts ==
| Chart (2007) | Peak position |
|---|---|
| Belgium (Ultratop 50 Flanders) | 28 |
| Belgium (Ultratip Bubbling Under Wallonia) | 13 |
| CIS Airplay (TopHit) | 153 |
| Denmark (Tracklisten) | 34 |
| Finland (Suomen virallinen lista) | 10 |
| Germany (GfK) | 86 |
| Hungary (Dance Top 40) | 39 |
| Hungary (Editors' Choice Top 40) | 37 |
| Hungary (Single Top 40) | 10 |
| Netherlands (Single Top 100) | 44 |
| UK Singles (Official Charts Company) | 149 |
