= Reverse takeover =

Acquisition of a public company by a private company

A reverse takeover (RTO), reverse merger, or reverse IPO is the acquisition of a public company by a private company so that the private company can bypass the lengthy and complex process of going public. Sometimes, conversely, the public company is bought by the private company through an asset swap and share issue. The transaction typically requires reorganization of capitalization of the acquiring company.

== Process ==
In a reverse takeover, shareholders of a private company purchase control of a public shell company or special-purpose acquisition company (SPAC), and then merge it with the private company. The publicly traded corporation is called a "shell," since all that exists of the original company is its organizational structure. The private company shareholders receive a substantial majority of the shares of the public company and control of its board of directors. The transaction can be accomplished within weeks.

The transaction involves the private and shell company exchanging information on each other, negotiating the merger terms, and signing a share exchange agreement. At the closing, the shell company issues a substantial majority of its shares and board control to the shareholders of the private company. The private company's shareholders pay for the shell company by contributing their shares in the private company to the shell company that they now control. This share exchange and change of control completes the reverse takeover, transforming the formerly privately held company into a publicly held company. Depending on the underwriters' agreements and other forward purchase agreements, the size of the company taken public in a reverse merger can exceed the market capitalization of the shell company/SPAC by a considerable amount.

In the United States, if the shell is an Securities and Exchange Commission (SEC)-registered company, the private company does not go through an expensive and time-consuming review with state and federal regulators because this process was completed beforehand with the public company. However, a comprehensive disclosure document containing audited financial statements and significant legal disclosures is required by the SEC for reporting issuers. The disclosure is filed on Form 8-K and is filed immediately upon completion of the reverse merger transaction.

== Benefits ==
=== Flexibility ===
Going public through a reverse takeover allows a privately held company to become publicly held at a lesser cost, and with less stock dilution, when compared with an initial public offering (IPO). While the process of going public and raising capital is combined in an IPO, in a reverse takeover, these two functions are separate. In a reverse takeover, a company can go public without raising additional capital. Separating these two functions greatly simplifies the process.

=== Resilience to market conditions ===
In addition, a reverse takeover is less susceptible to market conditions. Conventional IPOs are subject to risk of poor timing: if the market for a given security is "soft", the underwriter may pull the offering. If a company in registration participates in an industry that's making unfavorable headlines, investors may shy away from the deal. In a reverse takeover, since the deal rests solely between those controlling the public and private companies, market conditions have little bearing on the situation.

=== Expediency ===
The process for a conventional IPO can last for a year or more. When a company transitions from an entrepreneurial venture to a public company fit for outside ownership, how time is spent by strategic managers can be beneficial or detrimental. Time spent in meetings and drafting sessions related to an IPO can have a disastrous effect on the growth upon which the offering is predicated, and may even nullify it. In addition, during the many months it takes to put an IPO together, market conditions can deteriorate, making the completion of an IPO unfavorable. By contrast, a reverse takeover can be completed in as little as thirty days.

A 2013 study by Charles Lee of Stanford University found that: "Chinese reverse mergers performed much better than their reputation" and had performed better than other similar sized publicly traded companies in the same industrial sector.

== Drawbacks ==
=== Baggage ===
Reverse takeovers always come with some history and some shareholders. Sometimes this history can be bad and manifest itself in the form of currently sloppy records, pending lawsuits and other unforeseen liabilities. Additionally, these shell companies could have existing shareholders who could be anxious to sell their stock. One way the acquiring or surviving company can safeguard against the "dump" after the takeover is consummated is by requiring a lockup on the shares owned by the group from which they are purchasing the public shell. Other shareholders that have held stock as investors in the company being acquired pose no threat in a dump scenario because the number of shares they hold is not significant.

=== Fraud risk ===
On 9 June 2011, the United States Securities and Exchange Commission issued an investor bulletin cautioning investors about investing in reverse mergers, stating that they may be prone to fraud and other abuses.

The 2017 documentary film The China Hustle lays out a series of fraudulent reverse mergers between private Chinese companies and U.S. publicly traded firms, with the acquiring companies often operating as a front for non-existent business activity and defrauding US investors in the process. A large part of these scams was played through small US banks willing to ignore clear warning signs when promoting these newly merged companies to the public market.

=== Other ===
Reverse mergers may have other drawbacks. Private-company CEOs may be naïve and inexperienced in the world of publicly traded companies unless they have past experience as an officer or director of a public company. In addition, reverse merger transactions only introduce liquidity to a previously private stock if there is bona fide public interest in the company. A comprehensive investor relations and investor marketing program may be an indirect cost of a reverse merger.

== Examples ==
- The corporate shell of the REO Motor Car Company (whose sole asset was a tax loss carryover), in what amounted to a reverse "hostile" takeover, was forced by dissident shareholders to acquire a small publicly traded company, Nuclear Consultants. Eventually this company became the modern-day Nucor.
- ValuJet Airlines was acquired by AirWays Corp. to form AirTran Holdings, with the goal of shedding the tarnished reputation of the former.
- Aérospatiale was acquired by Matra to form Aérospatiale-Matra, with the goal of taking the former, a state-owned company, public.
- The game company Atari was acquired by JT Storage, as marriage of convenience.
- US Airways was acquired by America West Airlines, with the goal of removing the former from Chapter 11 bankruptcy. This deal was unique because unlike many examples listed in this section, US Airways creditors (not shareholders) were left with control.
- The New York Stock Exchange was acquired by Archipelago Holdings to form NYSE Group, with the goal of taking the former, a mutual company, public.
- ABC Radio was acquired by Citadel Broadcasting Corporation, with the goal of spinning the former off from its parent, Disney.
- CBS Radio was acquired by Entercom, with the goal of spinning the former off from its parent, CBS Corporation.
- Frederick's of Hollywood parent FOH Holdings was acquired by apparel maker Movie Star in order to take the larger lingerie maker public.
- Eddie Stobart in a reverse takeover with Westbury Property Fund allowing transport by ship, road, rail, or boat to and within the UK, using only one company.
- Clearwire acquired Sprint's Xohm division, taking the former company's name and with Sprint holding a controlling stake, leaving the resulting company publicly traded.
- T-Mobile US which was called T-Mobile USA, Inc. at the time acquired MetroPCS and after the merger was completed changed the company name to T-Mobile US and began trading on the New York Stock Exchange as TMUS.
- When the Holland America Line (HAL) was sold to Carnival Corporation & plc in 1989, the former owners (the Van der Vorm family) put the proceeds in an investment company (HAL Investments), using the cruise line's former Dutch listing to go public.
- When VMware was acquired by Dell, a reverse merge was in place so the latter would be back to the stock market as a public company.
- In July 2020, Fisker, Inc announced plans to go public via a merger with Spartan Acquisition Corp (SPAQ), a "blank-check" company backed by Apollo Global Management.
- In March 2025, Canadian media company Blue Ant Media announced that it would go public by performing a reverse merger with Boat Rocker Media. However, Blue Ant will only acquire the corporate entity itself and several of its studio units (including Insight Productions and Jam Filled Entertainment), with the remainder of Boat Rocker to be bought out by its management to continue operating thereafter.

== See also ==
- Capital formation
- Private investment in public equity
- Limited company
- Pac-Man defense
