= Overpowered =

Studio album by Róisín Murphy
- Released: 15 October 2007
- Recorded: 2006–2007
- Studio: Fluidity Busspace (Note: Track 1); Da Spot (Miami, Florida) (Note: Tracks 3, 6 and 10); The Studio (Philadelphia, Pennsylvania) (Note: Strings on tracks 3, 6 and 10); Fluidity (London, England) (Note: Tracks 5, 7 and 8); The Bowling Green (Sheffield, England) (Note: Track 9; additional recording on track 5); Mr Dan's (London, England) (Note: Track 11)
- Genre: Electropop; dance-pop; electro-disco
- Length: 50:47
- Label: EMI
- Producer: Dan Carey; Andy Cato; Jimmy Douglass; Ill Factor; Róisín Murphy; Parrot & Dean; Richard X; Seiji

Róisín Murphy chronology
Ruby Blue (2005)	Overpowered (2007)	Live at Ancienne Belgique 19.11.07 (2007)

Singles from Overpowered
- 1. "Overpowered" Released: 9 July 2007; 2. "Let Me Know" Released: 8 October 2007; 3. "You Know Me Better" Released: 31 March 2008; 4. "Movie Star" Released: 14 October 2008

Overpowered is the second solo studio album by Irish singer and songwriter Róisín Murphy. It was released on 15 October 2007 by EMI Records. Receiving widespread critical acclaim, the album was more commercially successful than its predecessor, Ruby Blue (2005), debuting at number 20 on the UK Albums Chart with 9,656 copies sold in its first week. Overpowered was shortlisted for the 2007 Choice Music Prize in Murphy's native Ireland. As of May 2015, the album had sold 65,532 copies in the United Kingdom.

== Background and recording ==
In 2006, while promoting her band Moloko's greatest hits album, Catalogue, Murphy announced that she was recording a new solo album to be released in 2007. After signing to EMI in May 2006, Murphy set out to produce a pop album with a heavy disco influence. With a bigger budget behind her than with her last record company, the independent Echo Records, Murphy recorded around 30 songs for the album with various producers and writers in Miami, London and Barcelona, commenting that each of the producers aided the pop influence of the album, as they all wanted to write "the single". She later noted, "It's the first time I've worked with multiple writers. I needed to keep in mind a clear idea what kind of record I wanted to make. There was no experiment about it".

Murphy collaborated with Scottish electronic musician Calvin Harris on the songs "Off & On" and "Don't Let It Go to Your Head Boy", which did not make the cut for Overpowered. During an interview with Popjustice, Harris called Murphy "a bit mental" for not including the songs on the album, while accusing her of "cost[ing] me all sorts of money" during recording. Murphy and Harris have since resolved their differences, and the song "Off & On" was ultimately recorded by English pop singer Sophie Ellis-Bextor for her 2011 album Make a Scene.

== Art direction ==
The artwork for Overpowered and its accompanying single releases was conceptualised by Scott King (who also directed the music videos for "Overpowered" and "Let Me Know"), and the cover images were photographed by Jonathan de Villiers. The artwork places Murphy wearing extraordinary outfits in everyday surroundings, presenting her as a "street diva" and a constant performer. Murphy wears outfits by Gareth Pugh, Givenchy and Viktor & Rolf in the artwork.

The design inside the booklet for Overpowered features a cryptic assemblage (resembling a flowchart but lacking directional indications found in such) made up of boxes containing statements and quotes, as well as apparent excerpts from the written treatment for the "Let Me Know" music video and assorted photographs. Among the known quotations are: "Writing about music is like dancing about architecture" (Laurie Anderson) and "I got signed to EMI because I reminded them of Robbie Williams" (Murphy). According to Murphy, the photography for the album and single sleeves cost £125,000.

== Promotion ==
The album was preceded by the title track "Overpowered", released as its lead single on 9 July 2007. As the single was ineligible to chart, it failed to enter the top 100 of the UK Singles Chart, instead reaching number 149. "Let Me Know" was released as the second single from the album on 8 October 2007, reaching number 28 on the UK Singles Chart. "You Know Me Better" was released as the album's third single on 31 March 2008, peaking at number 47 on the UK Singles Chart. The album's fourth and final single, "Movie Star", was released digitally in the United States on 14 October 2008.

In support of the album, Murphy embarked on an extensive tour across Europe. During the tour, she also performed in Australia and a one-night show in New York City. On 27 October 2007, Murphy sustained an eye injury during a concert in a Moscow club and had to cancel several subsequent shows. In total, Murphy performed 94 shows in 29 countries from 17 November 2007 to 2 November 2008.

== Critical reception ==
Professional ratings
Aggregate scores
Source	Rating
Metacritic	82/100
Review scores
Source	Rating
About.com	4.5/5 stars
AllMusic	4.5/5 stars
Drowned in Sound	6/10
musicOMH	4/5 stars
NME	6/10
The Observer	5/5 stars
Pitchfork	8.0/10
Stylus Magazine	B+
The Sunday Times	3/5 stars
Yahoo! Music	8/10 stars

Overpowered received widespread acclaim from music critics. At Metacritic, which assigns a normalised rating out of 100 to reviews from mainstream publications, the album received an average score of 82, based on 12 reviews. The Observer's Garry Mulholland lauded the album as "a sumptuous 11-track, all-killer-no-filler, electro-disco gem", adding that its "bubbling, sensual, and soulful glitterball gems effortlessly tap into the perennial glory of feeling lost and lonely at the disco at the end of the world." Heather Phares of AllMusic wrote that it was fitting "for such a pop-focused album" that "nearly every song on Overpowered sounds like a potential smash hit. Even if this album is a bid for the big time, it's done with such flair that it just underscores what a confident and unique artist Murphy really is." Ben Urdang of musicOMH praised Overpowered as Murphy's "most coherent album yet", noting that her songwriting "appears to be stronger than ever with a consistent style and sound emerging throughout." Emily Mackay of Yahoo! Music expressed that on Overpowered, Murphy "melded the two sides of her history much more seamlessly; four-to-the-floor pop belters mix with touches of electronic and lyrical darkness to make one of the pop albums of the year."

Stephen Trouss of Pitchfork commented, "In a year of low-stakes disappointment for European pop, Overpowered is a triumph." Stylus Magazine's Dan MacRae found that "Overpowered knows how to squeech and squelch in the proper places, while touches of cowbell, beatboxery, and the occasional Prince styled riff all get sprinkled in accordingly." Jax Spike of About.com described the album as "pretty overpowering itself, containing solid electropop music with plenty of funky flavor and some really wild beats, with her smooth voice exuding confidence despite any moments of breathiness." The Sunday Times critic Mark Edwards opined, "The music on Overpowered plays down her quirky (all right, difficult) side in favour of a melange of disco/house styles from 1975 to 1989. It lacks the glam wit of Goldfrapp or the cheekiness of Kylie, but it's brisk and efficient." NME viewed Overpowered as "a thoroughly modern pop album that will best appeal to ageing clubbers." In a mixed review, Cpt H.M. 'Howling Mad' Murdock of Drowned in Sound concluded, "Not once does Overpowered really drag its feet, but it never truly impacts with the might one could possibly expect from an artist with such a fine pedigree. It's a solid pop album, one wonderfully in tune with today's stylistic shifts and trends." Lauren Murphy of entertainment.ie felt that the album "sticks rigidly to a tried-and-tested formula, rarely colouring outside the lines or deviating from the disco/house vibe", but noted that "there are some fantastically uplifting dance-pop tunes here, all launched forth with the effortless vigour that Murphy does so well."

== Track listing ==
Overpowered track listing
No.	Title	Writer(s)	Producer(s)	Length
1.	"Overpowered"	Róisín Murphy; Paul Dolby; Mike Patto	Murphy; Seiji	5:08
2.	"You Know Me Better"	Murphy; Andy Cato	Murphy; Cato; Ill Factor^{[a]}	4:18
3.	"Checkin' on Me"	Murphy; Ivan Corraliza; Jimmy Douglass; Cheri London	Murphy; Douglass; Ill Factor	4:39
4.	"Let Me Know"	Murphy; Cato	Murphy; Cato; Ill Factor^{[a]}	5:10
5.	"Movie Star"	Murphy; Dolby; Patto	Murphy; Parrot & Dean	4:02
6.	"Primitive"	Murphy; Corraliza	Murphy; Douglass; Ill Factor	4:50
7.	"Footprints"	Murphy; Dolby; Mark de Clive-Lowe	Murphy; Seiji	3:37
8.	"Dear Miami"	Murphy; Dolby; Patto	Murphy; Seiji	3:41
9.	"Cry Baby"	Murphy; Richard Barratt; Dean Honer; Mike Ward	Murphy; Parrot & Dean; Seiji^{[a]}	5:55
10.	"Tell Everybody"	Murphy; Corraliza; Douglass; London	Murphy; Douglass; Ill Factor	3:51
11.	"Scarlet Ribbons"	Murphy; Barratt; Honer; Ward	Murphy; Dan Carey	5:36
12.	"Body Language" (bonus track)	Murphy; Cato	Murphy; Cato	4:40
13.	"Parallel Lives" (bonus track)	Murphy; Richard X	Murphy; Richard X	4:22

European iTunes Store bonus track
No.	Title	Writer(s)	Producer(s)	Length
14.	"Pandora"	Murphy; Richard X	Richard X; Murphy	3:56

Notes

- ^{^a} signifies an additional producer

== Personnel ==
=== Musicians ===
- Róisín Murphy – vocals
- Mike Patto – keyboards (tracks 1, 8); guitar (tracks 5, 8)
- Seiji – keyboards (tracks 1, 7); drums (tracks 1, 7, 8)
- Dave Okumu – guitar (tracks 1, 7, 8)
- Andy Cato – instruments (tracks 2, 4, 12)
- Jimmy Douglass – guitar (track 3)
- Ill Factor – instruments (tracks 3, 10)
- Ivan Corraliza – brass arrangements (track 3)
- Stephen Tirpak – brass arrangement, trombone (track 3)
- Matt Cappy – trumpet (track 3)
- Carl Cox – tenor saxophone (track 3)
- Stephan Murphy – bass (track 3)
- Larry Gold – string arrangements (tracks 3, 6, 10)
- Kevin Rudolf – guitar (track 4)
- Parrot & Dean – synths, programming (tracks 5, 9)
- Ross Orton – drums (track 5)
- Mark de Clive-Lowe – keyboards (track 7)
- Philly Smith – backing vocals (track 9)
- Cheri London – backing vocals (track 10)
- Davide de Rose – drums (track 11)
- Eddie Stevens – keyboards (track 11)
- Robin Mullarkey – bass (track 11)
- Jan Ozveren – guitar (track 11)
- Richard X – keyboards (track 13)

=== Technical ===
- Seiji – production (tracks 1, 7, 8); recording engineering (tracks 5, 7, 8); additional production (track 9)
- Tom Elmhirst – mixing (tracks 1, 3, 5, 6, 8, 9, 12, 13)
- Andy Cato – production (tracks 2, 4, 12); engineering (tracks 2, 12); recording engineering (track 4)
- Ill Factor – additional production (tracks 2, 4); production (tracks 3, 6, 10)
- Eric Kupper – mixing (track 2)
- Jimmy Douglass – production (tracks 3, 6, 10); mixing (track 7, 8, 10, 12)
- Joshua Maiden – recording engineering (tracks 3, 6, 10)
- Dan Carey – mixing (track 4, 11); production, recording engineering (track 11)
- Alexis Smith – mix assistance (track 4); engineering assistance (track 11)
- Parrot & Dean – production (tracks 5, 9)
- Dean Honer – additional recording engineering (track 5); recording engineering (track 9)
- Richard X – production (track 13)
- Tom Coyne – mastering engineering (track 13)
- Róisín Murphy – production

=== Artwork ===
- Scott King – art direction, design
- Jonathan de Villiers – photography

== Charts ==
=== Weekly charts ===
Weekly chart performance for Overpowered
Chart (2007)	Peak position
Australian Albums (ARIA)	105
Austrian Albums (Ö3 Austria)	35
Belgian Albums (Ultratop Flanders)	4
Belgian Albums (Ultratop Wallonia)	34
Dutch Albums (Album Top 100)	13
European Albums (Billboard)	30
Finnish Albums (Suomen virallinen lista)	28
French Albums (SNEP)	154
German Albums (Offizielle Top 100)	57
Irish Albums (IRMA)	51
Polish Albums (ZPAV)	16
Scottish Albums (OCC)	46
Swiss Albums (Schweizer Hitparade)	32
UK Albums (OCC)	20

=== Year-end charts ===
Year-end chart performance for Overpowered
Chart (2007)	Position
Belgian Albums (Ultratop Flanders)	48

== Certifications ==
Certifications for Overpowered
Region	Certification	Certified units/sales
Belgium (BRMA)	Gold	15,000^{*}
United Kingdom (BPI)	Silver	65,532
^{*} Sales figures based on certification alone.

== Release history ==
Release history for Overpowered
Region	Date	Label	Ref.
Germany	11 October 2007	EMI	
Netherlands	11 October 2007	EMI	
France	15 October 2007	EMI	
Poland	15 October 2007	EMI	
United Kingdom	15 October 2007	EMI	
Finland	17 October 2007	EMI	
Australia	26 October 2007	EMI	
