= Movie Star =

A movie star is an actor who is famous for their starring, or leading, roles in motion pictures.

Movie Star may also refer to:

== Music ==
- "Moviestar" (Harpo song), a 1975 song
- "Moviestar" (Stereophonics song), a 2004 song
- "Movie Star" (song), a 2007 song performed by Róisín Murphy
- "Movie Star", a song by Prince from the 1998 box set Crystal Ball
- "Movie Star", a song by Cracker from the 1993 album Kerosene Hat
- "Movie Star", a song by Rascalz from the 2002 album Reloaded
- "Movie Star", a song by Lizzy McAlpine from her 2024 album Older
- "I Wanna Be a Movie Star" (also known as "Movie Star"), a 2017 song by Bill Wurtz
- Movie Star (single album), a 2023 album by Mijoo

== Other uses ==
- Movie Star (company), a New York City-based clothing manufacturer
- "The Movie Star", an episode of the American television series Smash
- Movie Stars (TV series), a 1999 American sitcom

== See also ==
- Superstar
- Celebrity
