= Gareth Pugh =

English fashion designer

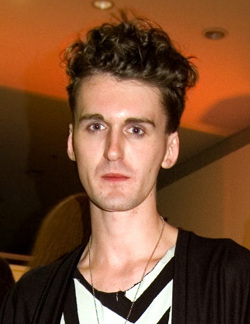
- Pugh in 2007
- Born: 31 August 1981 (age 44); Sunderland, Tyne and Wear, England
- Label: Gareth Pugh

Gareth Pugh (born 31 August 1981) is an English fashion designer based in London. He is known for his unconventional use of volume and form when designing outfits, and his work is described as performance art. He achieved prominence in the Kashpoint's Autumn 2005 Alternative Fashion Week group show, and he made his solo premiere in London's Fall 2006 fashion week. Due to his focus on experimental fashion, Pugh has had limited success selling wearable clothes. Instead, his projects are funded through patronage by Rick Owens and Michèle Lamy. His designs have been sported by notable performers, including Kylie Minogue, Beyoncé, and Lady Gaga.

== Career ==
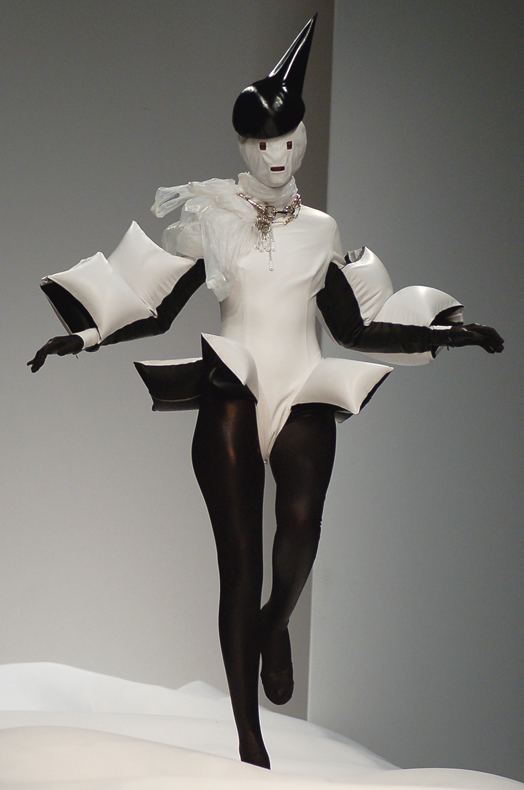
Pugh's trademark inflated clothing

At 14, Pugh began working as a costume designer for the National Youth Theatre. He started his fashion education at City of Sunderland College and finished his degree in Fashion Design at Central Saint Martins in 2003. He interned with Rick Owens in Paris. His final collection at St. Martins, which used balloons to accentuate models' joints and limbs (a technique that would become one of his trademarks), attracted the attention of the senior fashion editor of Dazed & Confused magazine, who placed one of his designs on the magazine's cover shortly thereafter.

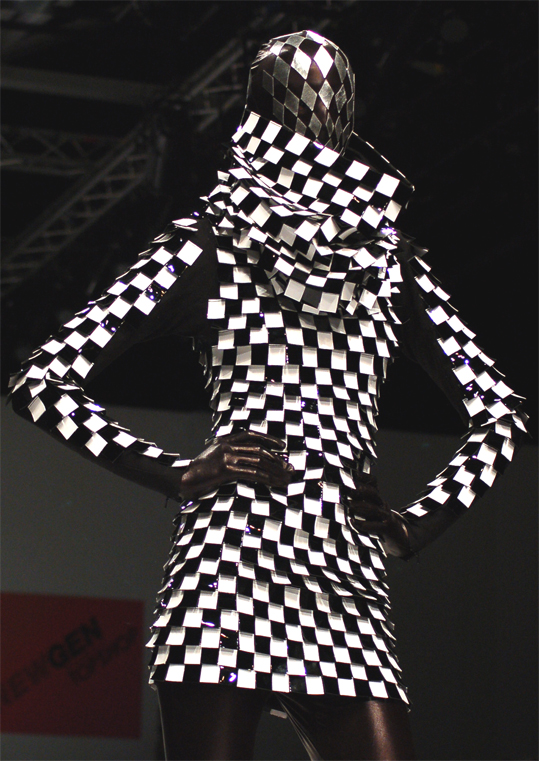
Pugh's Spring 2007 collection also featured somewhat more wearable clothing, like this dress.

Pugh was selected to participate in the British reality show The Fashion House two months after his graduation, which he would later call "horrible" and his "only other option [to being on] the dole." The rise of !WOWOW!, a feature in Dazed & Confused, and a debut show at London club Kashpoint's Alternative Fashion Week brought Pugh to the attention of Fashion East, "London's breeding ground for cutting-edge new talent," leading them to invite Pugh to participate in its Autumn 2005 group show. Pugh had only four weeks, with no studio, no assistants, and little money, to create the collection. His collection ended up a critical success and attracted significant attention to his collections.

Pugh's solo premiere was in London's Fall 2006 fashion week; he has since shown his Spring 2007 and Autumn 2007 collections there. Pugh's shows have continued to draw critical praise. British Vogue, for instance, called his Spring 2007 collection "an incredible, unmissable show" and said that "his genius is undeniable." Anna Wintour is a notable supporter of Pugh's designs.

Kylie Minogue has used many of Pugh's designs over the past few years, most famously in her Showgirl - The Greatest Hits Tour and Showgirl - The Homecoming Tour. Róisín Murphy recently appeared flamboyantly sporting one of Pugh's distinctive outfits in the videoclip promoting her 2007 album Overpowered, and on the cover of her single "Let Me Know", and on other occasions. Minogue has been seen wearing the same dress in her 2008 video for her single "In My Arms". Beyoncé wore Pugh at the MTV Europe Awards in 2008, and for her "Diva" video. Singer Lady Gaga wore a jacket designed by Pugh at the Wango Tango concert in 2009, another piece on X Factor, and most recently to her ARTPOP premiere at ArtRave. Ashlee Simpson wore a leather and clear plastic striped Gareth Pugh dress in her video "Outta My Head." British pop music duo Pet Shop Boys wore Gareth Pugh outfits at their iconic performance at the 2012 Summer Olympics, with a reinterpreted design inspired by their post-modern look during their 1993 Very era.

In 2010, Gareth Pugh opened his first boutique in Hong Kong.

Pugh was mentioned in a song by Kazaky, a Ukrainian dance music group.

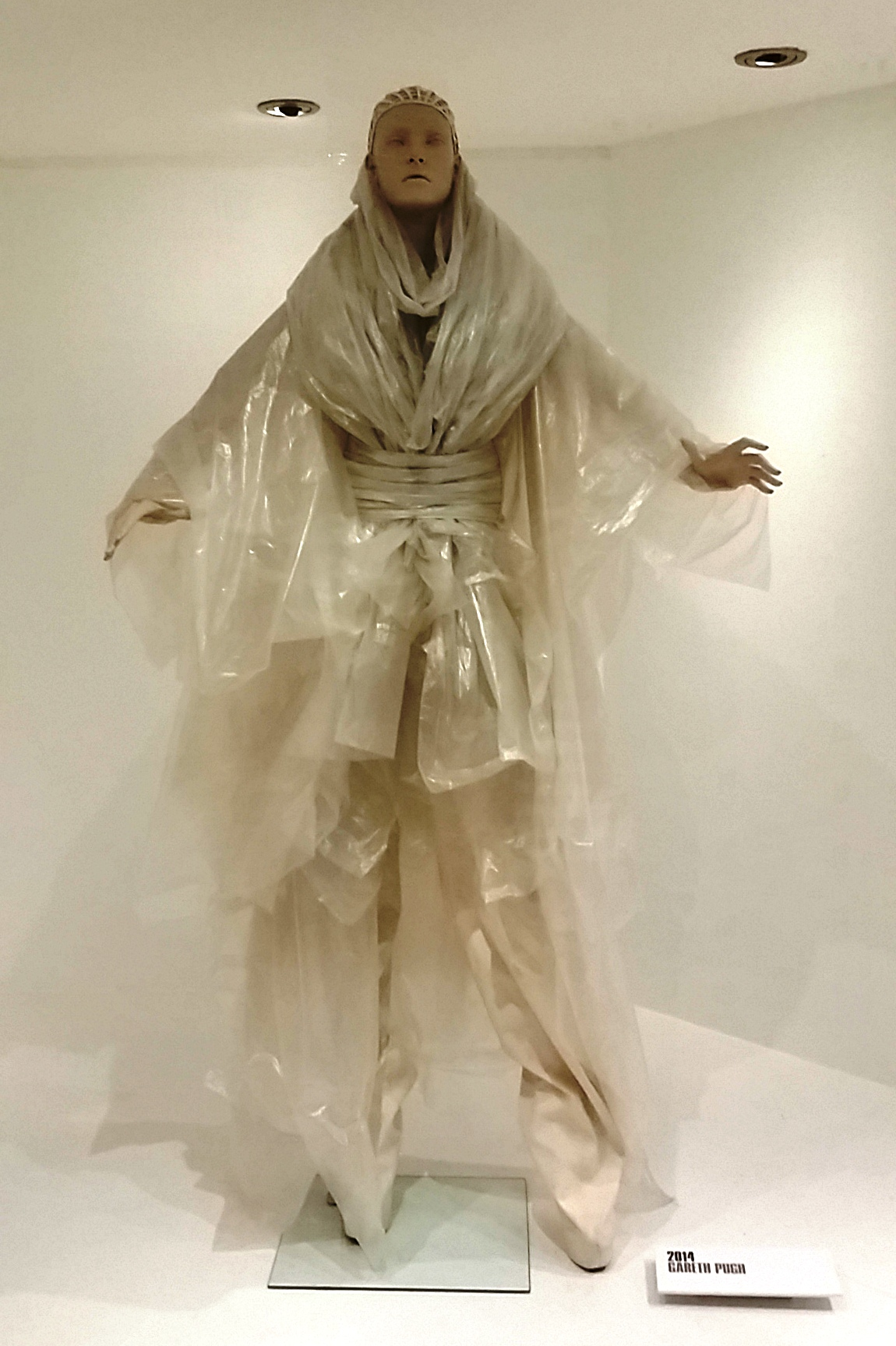
Dress of the Year 2014

In 2014, fashion journalist and stylist Katie Grand was invited by the Fashion Museum, Bath, to select an outfit to represent that year in their Dress of the Year collection. She chose one of Gareth Pugh's ensembles, a wrapped outfit in calico and plastic sheeting. Later in spring-summer LFW of 2019, the Virgin Voyages revealed the collection designed by Pugh for the group.

== Aesthetic ==
Style.com describes Pugh as the "latest addition to a long tradition of fashion-as-performance-art that stretches back through Alexander McQueen, John Galliano, and Vivienne Westwood to the eighties club culture of Leigh Bowery." (Pugh, however, dismisses frequent Bowery comparisons as "lazy journalism.") Klaus Nomi has also been suggested as an influence on Pugh. Pugh's collections are autobiographical rather than referential, and draw inspiration from Britain's extreme club scene. Pugh's trademark is his experimentation with form and volume. He often uses "nonsensically shaped, wearable sculptures" to "distort[] the human body almost beyond recognition." Elements in his designs include PVC inflated into voluminous coats, black and white patchwork squares, Perspex discs linked like chain mail, and shiny latex masks and leggings; he has used materials including mink, parachute silk, foam footballs, afro-weave synthetic and human hair, and electrically charged plastic in his clothing. Pugh describes his designs as being "about the struggle between lightness and darkness."

== Commercial potential ==
Though he has received significant acclaim in contemporary fashion circles, Pugh claimed in March 2007 that he had yet to sell a single dress and that he struggled to make ends meet. (Until his Spring 2007 collection, his clothes were solely catwalk experiments and simply unavailable to purchase.) While constructing his autumn 2005 debut collection, shown in the Fashion East group show, he was squatting in a converted warehouse. (A court order ultimately forced him to leave the building.) He says his current studio is unheated and has only two electrical outlets. It remains to be seen whether Pugh can be a commercial success as well as a critical one, but he is slowly shifting to more wearable clothing in his runway shows and he has partnered with Rick Owens and Michéle Lamy, who hold a 49% interest in Gareth Pugh's firm. The husband and wife team now fund all of Pugh's collection development, production and marketing activities.

== Accolades ==
Pugh was awarded the prestigious ANDAM Fashion Award in 2008. He received an Honorary Doctorate of Arts from the University of Sunderland in 2018.
