= You Know Me Better =

Single by Róisín Murphy

from the album Overpowered
- B-side: "Keep It Loose"; "Pandora"
- Released: 31 March 2008
- Recorded: 2007
- Genre: Electropop; electro-disco
- Length: 4:18
- Label: EMI
- Songwriter(s): Róisín Murphy; Andy Cato
- Producer(s): Andy Cato; Ill Factor

Róisín Murphy singles chronology
"Let Me Know" (2007)	"You Know Me Better" (2008)	"Movie Star" (2008)

"You Know Me Better" is a song by Irish singer Róisín Murphy from her second studio album, Overpowered (2007). It was written by Murphy and Andy Cato and produced by Cato, with additional production by Ill Factor. The song was released on 31 March 2008 as the album's third single.

== Single cover ==
The photoshoot of the single artwork can be viewed on her official website and YouTube channel as of 4 January 2008. The art director of the single was British graphic designer Scott King and the photographer was Jonathan de Villiers. The cover depicts Murphy wearing an outfit by Givenchy.

== Critical reception ==
"You Know Me Better" was well received by music critics. Peter Paphides of The Times described the song as "a rush of colour slowly surging outwards from a hook of pared-back austerity." Alex Fletcher of Digital Spy gave the song four out of five stars, saying producer Andy Cato "lay[s] down a squelching disco groove that veers between early 1990s house and the sound of New Order's 'Blue Monday' being fiddled with by the Human League. A typically sultry Murphy more than rises to the occasion, delivering the crisp, soothing vocals that earned Moloko a flash of chart success at the start of the decade."

Jax Spike of About.com noted that the song "is a more up-tempo track that comes across as pure enchanted bliss with its tough, staccato vocal and conventional, insistent chorus concealing a quite complex emotional position." Ben Hogwood of musicOMH, stated, "In some way that pushes it closer to a Groove Armada guest slot, but Murphy's vocals are strong enough to pull it back, a slice of electro-disco that may be polished within an inch of its life, but comes back for more with its yearning melody." Cpt H.M. 'Howling Mad' Murdock of Drowned in Sound commented that the track "mirrors Robyn's recent chart achievements in icy cool style."

== Music video ==
The music video for "You Know Me Better" was directed by Canadian director Jaron Albertin and shot at a suburban home in Snaresbrook, North East London. The video premiered on 11 March 2008 and features Murphy at different places in the house playing different characters, each one wearing a different outfit and hairstyle, inspired by the women depicted in the Untitled Film Stills series by American photographer Cindy Sherman.

== Track listings ==
- UK CD 1
1. "You Know Me Better" (Radio Edit) – 3:50
2. "Keep It Loose" – 3:26
- UK CD 2
1. "You Know Me Better" (Album Version) – 4:17
2. "Pandora" – 3:56
3. "You Know Me Better" (Guy Williams Vocal) – 7:09
4. "You Know Me Better" (Toddla T Mix) – 3:07
- UK 7" single

A. "You Know Me Better" (Radio Edit) – 3:50
B. "Pandora" – 3:56

- UK double 12" single

A1. "You Know Me Better" (Album Version)
A2. "You Know Me Better" (Trevor Loveys Vocal)
B1. "You Know Me Better" (Guy Williams Vocal)
B2. "You Know Me Better" (Samim Remix)
C1. "You Know Me Better" (Album Instrumental)
C2. "You Know Me Better" (Nightmoves Mix)
D1. "You Know Me Better" (Trevor Loveys Dub)
D2. "You Know Me Better" (Guy Williams Dub)

- Digital single – Live at Koko

(Available exclusively on iTunes and 7digital)

1. "You Know Me Better" (Live at Koko) – 7:30
- Digital single – Samim Remix

(Available exclusively on iTunes, 7digital and Recordstore.co.uk)

1. "You Know Me Better" (Samim Remix) – 6:02
- Digital single – Andy Cato Alternative Mix

(Available exclusively at ConcertLive and 7Digital)

1. "You Know Me Better" (Andy Cato Alternative Mix) - 3:55
- Digital EP 1
1. "You Know Me Better" (Radio Edit) – 3:42
2. "Keep It Loose" – 3:34
3. "Pandora" – 3:56
- Digital EP 2
1. "You Know Me Better" (Album Version) – 4:17
2. "You Know Me Better" (Toddla T Vocal) – 3:07
3. "You Know Me Better" (Guy Williams Dub) – 6:22
4. "You Know Me Better" (Trevor Loveys Dub) – 5:16
- Digital EP 3
1. "You Know Me Better" (Album Version) – 4:17
2. "You Know Me Better" (Guy Williams Vocal) – 7:07
3. "You Know Me Better" (Trevor Loveys Vocal) – 7:02
4. "You Know Me Better" (Nightmoves Mix) – 8:48

== Credits and personnel ==
Credits adapted from the liner notes of the CD single.

- Róisín Murphy – vocals, songwriting
- Dick Beetham – editing
- Andy Cato – engineering, instruments, production, songwriting
- Ill Factor – additional production
- Scott King – art direction, design
- Eric Kupper – mixing
- Jonathan de Villiers – photography

== Charts ==
Chart (2008–2009)	Peak position
Australia (ARIA)	98
Belgium (Ultratip Bubbling Under Flanders)	13
Scotland (OCC)	19
UK Singles (OCC)	47
