= FabricLive.13 =

Compilation album by J Majik
- Released: December 1, 2003
- Genre: Drum and bass
- Label: Fabric
- Producer: J Majik

J Majik chronology
Infrastructure (2001)	FabricLive.13 (2003)	Red Alert (2005)

FabricLive chronology
FabricLive.12 (2003)	FabricLive.13 (2003)	FabricLive.14 (2004)

FabricLive.13 is a DJ mix compilation album by J Majik, as part of the FabricLive Mix Series.

== Track listing ==
1. Infrared – Me Lever – Infrared 4:38
2. Tali – High Hopes – Full Cycle 1:23
3. DJ Hazard – Enuff Iz Enuff – Ganja 4:41
4. J Majik, Future Bound & Wickerman – Pitbull – Infrared 1:25
5. Generation Dub – Deliverance – Formation 2:08
6. Pascal – P Funk 04 (Movin Fusion mix) – True Playaz 2:30
7. Total Science & Baron – Monkey See, Monkey Do – Baron Inc 3:50
8. M.I.S.T. Vs DJ Marky & XRS – Back To Love – Soul:R 2:51
9. Infrared Vs Gil Felix – Capoeira – Infrared 4:17
10. DJ Hype – Original Foundation – Ganja 3:12
11. Wickerman – Hustler – Infrared 1:47
12. Hold Tight – 9 2 5 – Industry 2:19
13. Total Science – Nosher (Baron remix) – CIA 2:19
14. Peshay feat. Studio 12 – Jammin' – Cubik 3:34
15. DJ Clipz – Cuban Links (Fresh mix) – Emcee 2:29
16. Swift – Play Me – Charge 1:46
17. Dillinja – Fast Car – Valve – 3:12
18. John B – Pressure (remix) – Valve 2:35
19. DJ Fresh – Temple Of Doom – Breakbeat Kaos 2:29
20. J Majik & Wickerman – Fleshwound – Infrared 1:54
21. Photek – We Got Heat (Ram Trilogy mix) – 51st State/Photek 3:44
22. Badmarsh & Shri Signs (Calibre remix) – Outcaste 2:18
23. Black Widow – No Trace – Black Widow 2:59
24. Twisted Individual – Bandwagon Blues – Formation 3:12
25. J Majik & Wickerman ft. Kathy Brown – Feel The Music – Infrared 4:39
