= Let Me Know (Róisín Murphy song) =

Single by Róisín Murphy

from the album Overpowered
- B-side: "Sunshine"; "Unlovable"
- Released: 8 October 2007
- Recorded: 2007
- Genre: Nu-disco; dance-pop
- Length: 5:10
- Label: EMI
- Songwriter(s): Róisín Murphy; Andy Cato
- Producer(s): Róisín Murphy; Andy Cato

Róisín Murphy singles chronology
"Overpowered" (2007)	"Let Me Know" (2007)	"You Know Me Better" (2008)

"Let Me Know" is a song by Irish singer Róisín Murphy from her second studio album, Overpowered (2007). The song was written and produced by Murphy and Andy Cato. It was released on 8 October 2007 as the album's second single. "Let Me Know" reached number 28 on the UK Singles Chart, becoming Murphy's highest-peaking solo single to date.

== Single cover ==
The art director of the single was British graphic designer Scott King and the photographer was Jonathan de Villiers. Murphy is depicted wearing a design by English fashion designer Gareth Pugh on the cover.

== Critical reception ==
"Let Me Know" received positive reviews from music critics. While reviewing Overpowered, Mark Edwards of The Sunday Times commented that the song's hook is "strong enough to compensate for the album's duller moments." Nick Levine of Digital Spy gave the song four out of five stars, stating that it "melds propulsive synths, a nineties house piano riff and Murphy's crystalline vocals to create a groove that's harder to resist that a night of passion with Brad or Angelina (or both of them—whatever floats your boat, eh?)." Gemma Hampson wrote for musicOMH that it "retains a bit of that Moloko odd-ness that set the band aside from all the other disco, funk, dance groups around at the same time. Murphy's soft and feminine voice sits well above the '80s bouncy bass and funky electro percussion. It's got a good, retro beat, ruined slightly by the dated fake piano heard all too much in dance in the past 25 years."

== Music video ==
The music video for "Let Me Know" was directed by Daniel Wolfe and filmed at the now-closed Classy Touch Café in Slough. The video opens with Murphy, dressed in an outfit by Maison Margiela, entering a typical English greasy spoon and ordering food at the counter. As she places her coat and bag on her seat, the lights dim and the cafe slowly transforms into a nightclub setting complete with spotlight, multicoloured disco lights and strobe lights. Murphy runs and dances around the cafe while the other patrons appear to be totally oblivious to what is happening. As the song ends, Murphy takes her seat at her table where everything returns to normal and her plate of food is placed in front of her.

== Track listings ==
- UK CD 1
1. "Let Me Know" (Radio Edit) – 3:42
2. "Sunshine" – 3:06
- UK CD 2
1. "Let Me Know" (Album Version) – 5:10
2. "Unlovable" – 3:57
3. "Let Me Know" (Andy Cato Vedra Mix) – 8:16
4. "Let Me Know" (Joey Negro's Destination Boogie Vocal) – 7:12
5. "Let Me Know" (Video) – 4:05
- UK 7" single

A. "Let Me Know" (Radio Edit) – 3:42
B. "Sunshine" – 3:06

- UK 12" single

A1. "Let Me Know" (Album Version) – 5:07
A2. "Let Me Know" (Andy Cato Vedra Mix) – 8:16
B1. "Let Me Know" (Joey Negro's Destination Boogie Vocal) – 7:11
B2. "Cry Baby" (Paul Oakenfold Mix) – 6:32

- Digital single
1. "Let Me Know" (Radio Edit) – 3:41
- Digital EP 1
1. "Let Me Know (Radio Edit) – 3:41
2. "Sunshine" – 3:07
3. "Unlovable" – 3:56
4. "Cry Baby" (Paul Oakenfold Mix) – 6:23
- Digital EP 2
1. "Let Me Know" (Album Version) – 5:09
2. "Let Me Know" (Oscar the Punk Mix) – 6:08
3. "Let Me Know" (Andy Cato Vedra Mix) – 8:16
4. "Let Me Know" (Joey Negro's Original Vibe Mix) – 7:01
5. "Let Me Know" (Joey Negro's Destination Boogie Club) – 7:12
6. "Let Me Know" (Joey Negro's Destination Boogie Dub) – 7:45
- Digital single – Demo Version
1. "Let Me Know" (Demo Version) – 4:10

== Credits and personnel ==
Credits adapted from the liner notes of the CD single.

- Róisín Murphy – vocals, production, songwriting
- Dan Carey – mixing
- Andy Cato – engineering, instruments, production, songwriting
- Ill Factor – additional production
- Scott King – art direction, design
- Kevin Rudolf – guitar
- Alexis Smith – studio assistance
- Jonathan de Villiers – photography

== Charts ==
Chart (2007)	Peak position
Belgium (Ultratop 50 Flanders)	25
Belgium (Ultratip Bubbling Under Wallonia)	10
CIS Airplay (TopHit)	171
Europe (European Hot 100 Singles)	82
Finland (Suomen virallinen lista)	11
Netherlands (Single Top 100)	88
Scotland (OCC)	23
UK Singles (OCC)	28
