= J Majik =

English drum and bass DJ and producer

J Majik (born James Spratling, Northwood, England) is a drum and bass DJ and producer. He has been active since his early teens in the early 1990s.

== Biography ==
He released his first track in 1992 (as DJ Dextrous) on the Planet Earth record label. By 1994, he had changed his stage name to the current moniker (because there was already another DJ Dextrous within the scene with a following) recording with Suburban Base Records, and was releasing tracks on the Metalheadz label. Since then Majik has released tracks on the Mo' Wax label, and now runs his own label, Infrared. He also makes music under the names Innervisions and Infrared.

== Collaborations with ==
- Goldie
- Adam F
- Danny J
- DJ Hype
- Hatiras
- Kathy Brown
- Liquid People
- Sonic & Silver
- Wickaman
- Junglist BassPrey
- DJ Ugallu

== Discography ==
=== Selected albums ===
- FabricLive.13
- Red Alert 2005
- Crazy World 2008

=== Singles ===
- "Your Sound" (1995)
- "Jim Kutta" (1995)
- "Arabian Nights" (1996)
- "Love Is Not a Game" (featuring Kathy Brown) (2000) - UK #34
- "The Lizard" (2000)
- "Solarize" (2001)
- "Metrosound" (with Adam F) (2002) - UK #54
- "24 Hours" (2002)
- "Spaced Invader" (2001) on Defected Records
- "Scooby Doo" / "Spycatcher" (with Wickaman) (2004) - UK #67
- "Crazy World" (with Wickaman) (2008)
- "In Pieces" (with Wickaman featuring Dee Freer) (2011)

=== Remixes ===
- 2003: Adam F - Where's My...?
- 2005: Breakfastaz - Midnight (With Wickaman)
- 2008: Deadmau5 & Kaskade - I Remember (With Wickaman)
- 2008: Goldie - Shining Down (With Goldie)
- 2010: The Qemists featuring Maxsta - Renegade (With Wickaman)
- 2010: Cutline - Die for You (With Wickaman)
