= DJ Spinbad =

American DJ (1974–2020)

- Born: Chris Sullivan; October 23, 1974; New York City, United States
- Origin: New York City
- Died: November 10, 2020 (aged 46) New York City, U.S.
- Genres: Alternative rock, Club, East Coast Rap, Electro, Electronic dance, House, Reggae, Trap, Turntablism
- Occupations: DJ, Producer, Remixer
- Instrument: Turntables
- Years active: 1986–2020
- Labels: MIC Media; Fabric
- Website: www.spinbad.com

Chris Sullivan (October 23, 1974 – November 10, 2020), known professionally as DJ Spinbad, was a DJ, producer, and remixer on New York City's radio station WHTZ.

== Career ==
DJ Spinbad was a guest on the syndicated radio show Live In Tha Den With Big Tigger. Spinbad was also formerly heard on WWPR at 10:00 p.m.–12:00 a.m. on Fridays. He was also heard on WHTZ in twenty-minute sets at 7:00 p.m. and 12:00 a.m. on weekdays, Fridays at 5:00 p.m., and Saturdays and Sundays at 7:00 p.m. He was also heard on WHTZ on Saturdays from 11:00 p.m.–2:00 a.m. live from Webster Hall in New York City. Recent recession cutbacks, according to his MySpace page, forced WHTZ to cut him from their lineup.

In 2011, Spinbad returned to WHTZ as a part of the Saturday Night Online staff, which is also simulcast in other various radio markets around the country through syndication by Premiere Radio Networks.

DJ Spinbad toured with electronic artist Moby, and produced one of the albums in the Fabric Live series, described by Allmusic as "literally a party in a can", while Resident Advisor stated that it was "mixed extremely well". Spinbad also mixed the 2001 collection Underground Airplay Version 1.0. He also is credited with having the most bootlegged mix CD titled Rocks the Casbah (The '80s Megamix).

Spinbad deejayed for Russell Peters' comedy tours.

On November 10, 2020, DJ Spinbad died in New York City.

== Discography ==
=== Albums ===
- 2001: Underground Airplay Version 1.0, MIC Media
- 2004: FabricLive.14, Fabric

=== Mixtapes ===
- 1995: Rock the Cashbah (The '80s Megamix)
- 1997: Clueless? (With DJ Slynkee)
- 1998: Needle to the Groove
- 2000: Cold Cutz Remixes (With DJ JS-1)
- 2000: The '80s Megamix, Vol. 2
- 2001: You Know My Steez: '90s Hip-Hop
- 2001: Break Yo' Neck
- 2002: Spinbad's Alturnatives
- 2003: '90s Hip-Hop Megamix
- 2003: Powermix
- 2003: The Problem Solver (Hosted By: Big Tigger)
- 2004: No More Bullsh*t Blends
- 2004: Powermix, Vol. 2 (Hosted By: Tony Touch)
- 2005: Powermix, Vol. 3 (Hosted By: LL Cool J)
- 2007: Murphy's Law (With DJ Whoo Kid)
- 2007: The Best Of Murda Mixtape (With DJ Whoo Kid)
- 2009: The '90s Megamix
- 2009: Live in Japan
- 2010: Reggae Classics: Lover's Rock, Vol. 1
- 2010: Needle to the Groove 2
- 2011: Live in Japan 2011
- 2012: Live in South Africa
- 2012: End of the World Mix
- 2013: Live in India
