= Galerie Philia =

Coordinates: 40.74510°N 74.00527°W

- Industry: Art gallery
- Founded: 2015
- Number of locations: 4
- Website: galerie-philia.com

Galerie Philia is an international contemporary design and art gallery with locations in Mexico, Geneva, New York, and Singapore.

== History ==
Galerie Philia was founded in 2015 by the Attali brothers. Philia derives from ancient Greek word and means "friendship" or "affection".

== Events ==
The gallery organizes permanent and temporary exhibitions by national and international artists. In 2021, Galerie Philia opened an exhibition at Walker Tower in New York, designed by Pietro Franceschini.

In 2022, Galerie Philia launched "Art Brut", a sculpture workshop for young children in Breil-sur-Roya. In the same year, the gallery opened the exhibition Jean Nouvel: Racines Aériennes, designed by Jean Nouvel. It was the first time that a private residence designed by Jean Nouvel was used for an art and design exhibition. Galerie Philia presented a design exhibition at Cité radieuse de Marseille, featuring works by designers such as Rick Owens.

In 2023, Pilar Zeta and Andrés Monnier present 'Antipodes' rock sculptures at Galerie Philia, during the Mexico City Art Week.

During the Milan Furniture Fair, Galerie Philia will present Desacralized, an exhibition on the theme of 'desacralisation', in the Chiesa di San Vittore e Quaranta martiri, located in the centre of Milan.

In 2024, the gallery presented Future Relics, an exhibition at the 16th‑century Giardino Corsini al Prato in Florence, featuring contemporary works inspired by the cultural heritage and archives of Medici Florence.

In 2025, Galerie Philia organized Then and Now: Brazilian Legacy, a weekend exhibition at Niterói Contemporary Art Museum in Rio de Janeiro combining early Brazilian modernist design with contemporary works that respond to the museum’s architecture. The same year, the gallery celebrated its tenth anniversary with STRATES, an exhibition held at Les Espaces d'Abraxas, a brutalist building near Paris, showcasing contemporary design and sculpture.

In 2026, Galerie Philia presented How High the Moon at the inaugural Salone Raritas during Salone del Mobile in Milan. The exhibition was selected by Dezeen as one of the standout installations of the event.
