= Movie Star (song) =

Single by Róisín Murphy

from the album Overpowered
- A-side: "Slave to Love"
- Released: 14 October 2008
- Recorded: 2007
- Genre: Electroclash; synth-pop
- Length: 4:02
- Label: EMI
- Songwriter(s): Róisín Murphy; Paul Dolby; Mike Patto
- Producer(s): Parrot & Dean

Róisín Murphy singles chronology
| "You Know Me Better" (2008) | "Movie Star" (2008) | "Orally Fixated" (2009) |

"Movie Star" is a song by Irish singer Róisín Murphy from her second studio album, Overpowered (2007). It was written by Murphy, Paul "Seiji" Dolby and Mike Patto, while production was handled by Parrot & Dean. The song was released digitally in the United States on 14 October 2008 as the album's fourth and final single.

== Release ==
The track was set to be released as the album's fourth single on 21 July 2008, but was then pushed back many times for a release in November. It was to be released as a double A-side single with a cover of Bryan Ferry's 1985 song "Slave to Love" to coincide with its use in the Gucci Pour Homme advertising campaign.

On 4 December 2008, it was announced that the European and UK release of the single had been cancelled. Nevertheless, "Movie Star" was released digitally in the United States on 14 October 2008.

== Critical reception ==
Heather Phares of AllMusic referred to "Movie Star" as "Murphy's spin on Goldfrapp's glossy glam pop (and the only time she seems in danger of being overpowered by someone else's sound on the album)." Stephen Trouss of Pitchfork agreed, saying the song "laces itself a little too tightly into Alison Goldfrapp's glam pop corset." Digital Spy music editor Nick Levine, however, wrote that the song is "possibly Murphy's most immediate moment yet, a trancey dance-pop epic with a chorus that reaches for the stars. The lyrics, which tell the tale of an ambitious starlet desperate to 'break into cinema', are sharp and amusing too." Jax Spike from About.com viewed the track as "a departure in conception and more reminiscent of something closer to early 90s eurodance crossed with industrial which generates an urgent, grinding sound."

== Music video ==
The music video for "Movie Star" was directed by Simon Henwood and features Murphy on a night out in London with several drag queens and performers, including Jodie Harsh and Theo Adams. Some scenes are inspired by the work of John Waters, such as the attack by Lobstora from his 1970 film Multiple Maniacs and the appearance of Divine lookalikes.

== Track listings ==
- US digital EP
1. "Movie Star" – 4:01
2. "Movie Star" (radio edit) – 3:46
3. "Movie Star" (Jnrsnchz Cinespace Mix) – 8:28
4. "Movie Star" (Kid Gloves Remix) – 10:19
- UK promotional CD-R maxi single
1. "Movie Star" (radio edit) – 3:45
2. "Movie Star" – 3:59
3. "Movie Star" (instrumental) – 3:59
4. "Movie Star" (Jnrsnchz Lax Mix) – 4:40
5. "Movie Star" (Jnrsnchz Cinespace Mix) – 8:31
6. "Movie Star" (Sam & Di Angelis 'She Is Beautiful' Remix) – 6:15
7. "Movie Star" (Sam & Di Angelis 'For Jodie Harsh' Remix) – 5:28
8. "Movie Star" (Kid Gloves Remix) – 10:22
9. "Movie Star" (Kid Gloves Dub) – 10:22
10. "Slave to Love" – 3:40
11. "Slave to Love" (instrumental) – 3:40
- UK promotional CD single
1. "Movie Star" (radio edit) – 3:46
2. "Movie Star" (instrumental) – 3:59
3. "Slave to Love" – 3:40
4. "Slave to Love" (instrumental) – 3:40
- Danish promotional CD-R maxi single
1. "Slave to Love" (album version) – 3:40
2. "Slave to Love" (instrumental) – 3:41
3. "Movie Star" (Junior Sanchez Space Mix) – 8:31
4. "Movie Star" (Junior Sanchez Laz Mix) – 4:40
5. "Movie Star" (Kid Gloves Dub) – 10:24
6. "Movie Star" (Kid Gloves Vocal Mix) – 10:22
7. "Movie Star" (Sam and Di Angelis 'She Is Beautiful' Remix) – 6:15
8. "Movie Star" (Sam and Di Angelis 'For Jodie Harsh' Remix) – 5:28

== Personnel ==
Credits adapted from the liner notes of Overpowered.

- Róisín Murphy – vocals, songwriting
- Tom Elmhirst – mixing
- Dean Honer – additional recording, production, programming, synthesiser
- Ross Orton – drums
- Parrot – producer, programming, synthesiser
- Mike Patto – guitar, songwriting
- Seiji – engineering, songwriting

== Charts ==
| Chart (2008) | Peak position |
|---|---|
| US Hot Singles Sales (Billboard) | 8 |
| US Hot Dance Singles Sales (Billboard) | 3 |
