= Veja (brand) =

French footwear and accessories brand

Veja Fair Trade SARL
- Industry: Footwear
- Founded: August 23, 2004
- Founder: Sébastien Kopp and François-Ghislain Morillion
- Headquarters: Paris
- Products: Sneakers
- Revenue: € 249 millions (2024) (€ 281 millions (2023))
- Net income: € 31,8 millions (2024) (€ 62,5 millions (2023))
- Number of employees: 500 (2022), 550 (2024)
- Website: www.veja-store.com

VEJA is a French sneaker brand founded in 2004 by Sébastien Kopp and François-Ghislain Morillion. “VEJA” means “to see” in Portuguese. The name was chosen to encourage consumers to look beyond the product itself: from sourcing materials and selecting producers to the working conditions behind the making of every sneaker.

Since its creation, VEJA has been designing sneakers differently, combining social projects, economic justice, and ecological materials. This alternative model in the footwear industry is based on the principles of fair trade: the use of environmentally friendly raw materials, fair wages, and production that respects social rights. Since its beginnings, the brand has sold more than 17 million pairs worldwide and is now distributed in over 100 countries.

== History ==
The VEJA project takes shape in the early 2000s. After conducting an international audit for major companies, Sébastien Kopp and François-Ghislain Morillion were struck by the excesses of globalization. Witnessing the gap between brands’ messaging and their social realities, they decided to create a brand capable of reinventing an everyday, cross-generational product: the sneaker.

Sébastien Kopp and François-Ghislain Morillion chose Brazil to launch production of their first pairs in 2005, both for the richness of its raw materials (wild rubber, organic and agroecological cotton, etc.) and for its labor laws, which offer strong protections for workers.

== Business model and philosophy ==
At the beginning of VEJA, the founders realized that most major sneaker brands relied heavily on marketing and advertising. VEJA chose a radically different approach: no marketing, no advertising, no sponsorship. The savings are reinvested into the production chain, allowing producers and partners to be paid above market rates, without increasing the final price of the sneakers. These principles have remained the same over the years, even in new communication channels: VEJA raises awareness and builds relationships with digital influencers but does not pay them to advertise the sneakers or the Project.

The company embraces a pragmatic approach to environmental and social challenges: it prioritizes transparency and concrete actions.

The group’s consolidated revenue reached €250 million in 2024. The company operates subsidiaries in France, Brazil, the US, Canada, Mexico, the UK, Germany, Belgium, Denmark, Portugal, Spain, South Korea, China, and Australia.

== Raw materials and technical components ==
VEJA develops and uses a range of technical components designed to improve the comfort, durability, and performance of its shoes, while minimizing their environmental impact.

=== Amazonian rubber ===
Amazonian rubber is one of VEJA's main raw materials, present in every pair and making up to 50% of the soles. The Amazon is the only region in the world where rubber trees grow naturally. The rubber used by VEJA comes from Fair for Life–certified supply chains, ensuring fair trade practices and respect for human rights. It is purchased directly from cooperatives of seringueiros, who harvest it using techniques that allow trees to regenerate in the Amazon rainforest. This activity helps preserve the forest by providing an economic alternative to deforestation and intensive cattle farming. In 2025, VEJA purchased Amazonian rubber at approximately 5 times the average market price. Since 2004, more than 5,000 tons have been purchased. VEJA has also used, since 2019, a satellite-based geolocation system to monitor protected forest areas in real time.

=== Recycled rubber ===
After several years of research, VEJA has developed a process to partially recycle its soles in Europe. The soles are collected, ground down, and then incorporated into new soles at a rate of 10%.

=== Organic cotton ===
The cotton used is certified organic (USDA Organic, EU Organic, GOTS, or the Brazilian Participatory Guarantee System). Most of the cotton used by VEJA comes from the northeastern region of Brazil, from family farmers who practice agroecology, a farming method that manages agricultural land in a way that preserves biodiversity, protects natural resources, and minimizes the environmental impact of agriculture, while meeting human needs. It relies on crop diversity and rotation, which naturally enriches the soil, promotes its regeneration, and increases ecosystem resilience to climate variability. The cotton purchased by VEJA in Peru is also organic, certified Regenerative Organic Certified (ROC). In 2025, VEJA purchased cotton at a price approximately 3 times higher than the average market price. Since 2004, more than 2,000 tons of cotton have been purchased.

=== Leather ===
VEJA mainly uses leather from Uruguay, sourced from traceable supply chains. All leathers are processed in tanneries certified Leather Working Group (LWG) Gold or Silver, guaranteeing high standards in environmental management. More than 90% of the leather in the sneakers is O.T. (Organic Traced) leather, which comes from certified organic farms in Uruguay, in the Pampa region, where animals are raised outdoors without chemical fertilizers or pesticides, on land that has not been deforested.

=== PET ===
VEJA uses 100% recycled and certified Polyethylene terephthalate (PET)., sourced from plastic bottles, for the lining of its models. Since 2023, the brand has sourced this raw material from a network of 200 catadores, organized into cooperatives in southern Minas Gerais, Brazil. They collect and sort recyclable waste and are responsible for nearly 90% of recycling in Brazil. VEJA purchases plastic directly from the cooperatives, at a price up to 3 times higher than the prevailing market price.

=== Bio-based EVA ===
Ethylene-vinyl acetate (EVA) is a lightweight and flexible material made from sugarcane and rubber, used primarily to provide cushioning. It is water-resistant and quickly returns to its original shape.

== Performance line ==
After several years of research and development, VEJA launched its first eco-friendly running shoe, the Condor, in 2019. This initiative marked the brand's entry into the sports world, with the goal of combining performance, comfort, and reduced environmental impact.

The Condor 3, the third generation of the model, is designed for road running. It combines bio-based and recycled materials directly integrated into performance, such as recycled polyester and Amazonian rubber. Its cushioning relies on an LFOAM midsole, a sugarcane-based foam reinforced with natural latex, providing continuous shock absorption.

In 2025, VEJA continues this trajectory with the Condor 3 Advanced. This version deepens the work on materials: use of bio-based E.V.A. made from sugarcane, Amazon rubber for the outsole, and Engineered Mesh in recycled polyester for the upper, lining, and laces. The goal is to significantly reduce the carbon footprint compared to running standards, a sector where shoes are predominantly made of plastic.

In 2026, VEJA expands its Running range with the Condor 3 Off Road, designed to move from road to trail, and the Harpie Trail, its first shoe entirely dedicated to trail running.

== The VEJA Cobbler Project ==
VEJA has been developing since 2020 an approach focused on repairing and extending the lifespan of products. A first shoe repair workshop opened at the VEJA x Darwin space in Bordeaux, followed by other locations in VEJA stores in Paris, Berlin, Madrid, London, New York, Los Angeles, and São Paulo.

A shoe repair workshop is set up at Log’ins, a company specializing in professional and social inclusion, to restore pairs with minor defects.

In 2024, VEJA opened the VEJA General Store in Paris, a concept store dedicated to repair, but also to the transmission of know-how around shoe repair and textiles.

VEJA shoe repair shops offer cleaning, repair, and restoration services for sneakers and shoes of all brands. In six years, more than 62,000 pairs have been repaired there.

== Collaborations ==
VEJA has signed many collaborations with creators, brands, associations, and artists, including:

- Rick Owens (2019)
- Lemaire (2019)
- Sea Shepherd (2022)
- Marni (2022)
- Études (2024)
- Sashiko Gals (2025)
- Magliano (2026)
- Baserange (2026)
- Misci (2026)
