= FabricLive.14 =

Compilation album by DJ Spinbad
- Released: February 2, 2004
- Genre: Rap
- Label: Fabric
- Producer: DJ Spinbad

DJ Spinbad chronology
Underground Airplay Version 1.0 (2001)	FabricLive.14 (2004)

FabricLive chronology
FabricLive.13 (2003)	FabricLive.14 (2004)	FabricLive.15 (2004)

Professional ratings
Review scores
Source	Rating
Allmusic	4/5 stars

FabricLive.14 is a DJ mix compilation album by DJ Spinbad, as part of the FabricLive Mix Series.

== Track listing ==
1. DJ Spinbad – Intro
2. Lord Tariq & Peter Gunz – Déjà Vu (Uptown Baby) – Sony
3. Nas – Halftime (Album Version) – Sony
4. Blahzay Blahzay – Danger – Polygram
5. M.O.P. – Ante Up (Robbin Hoodz Theory – Explicit Mix) – Loud
6. QB Finest Ft Nas & Bravehearts – Oochie Wally – Sony
7. Ol' Dirty Bastard – Shimmy Shimmy Ya – WEA
8. Crooklyn Clan – The Franklinz (Dirty Mix) – AV8
9. Crooklyn Clan – Thug Anthem – AV8
10. Mystikal – Shake Ya Ass (LP Version) – Zomba
11. KRS-One – Sound Of Da Police – Zomba
12. Boogie Down Productions – South Bronx – B Boy
13. Eric B & Rakim – Eric B. Is President (Album Version) – UMG
14. Special Ed – I Got It Made – Profile
15. Black Sheep – The Choice Is Yours (Album Version) – UMG
16. Showbiz & A.G. – Party Groove – London
17. The 45 King – The 900 Number – Tuff City
18. A Tribe Called Quest – Scenario – Zomba
19. Run DMC – Peter Piper – Arista
20. Run DMC – Walk This Way – Arista
21. Slick Rick – Mona Lisa – UMG
22. Rob Base & DJ EZ Rock – It Takes Two – Arista
23. Cheryl Lynn – Got To Be Real – Sony
24. Sugarhill Gang – Rapper's Delight – Sanctuary
25. Grandmaster Flash & Melle Mel – White Lines – Castle
26. Pete Rock & C.L. Smooth – The Creator – WEA
27. Chubb Rock – Treat 'Em Right – Select
