= Wickaman =

British drum and bass producer and DJ

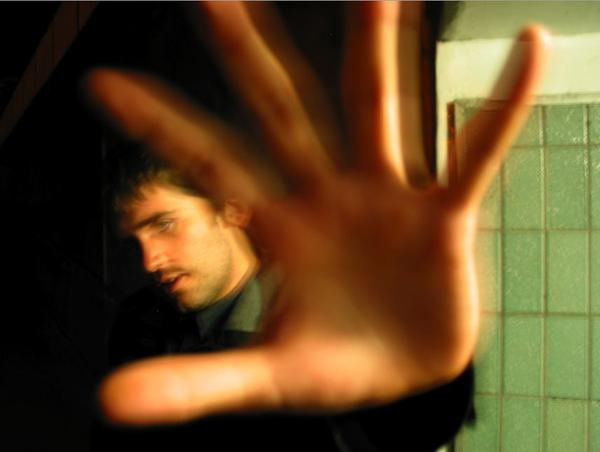

Background information
- Born: Andrew Parsons
- Origin: England
- Genres: Drum and bass
- Occupations: Record producer and DJ
- Labels: Black Widow; Infrared; Red Spider; ProgRAM

Wickaman is a British drum and bass producer and DJ.

He has worked with many other producers including Adam F, Asnide Slide, DJ Hype, Hoodlum, J Majik, Mavrik, Mc Morgan, and RV.

His debut album was Dubplate Killaz (mixed by DJ Hype.)

In September 2008, the track "Crazy World" with J Majik entered the UK Top 40, peaking at number 37. He also made a drum & bass remix of Deadmau5's "I Remember" with J Majik.

In December 2014, he released the album "Bug in the Jungle Vol.1" under the label The Bughouse. The album features Wickaman, Hoodlum, Mc Fun, Golden, Mavrik, and Liption Mc.
