= Michèle Lamy =

French culture and fashion figure (born 1944)

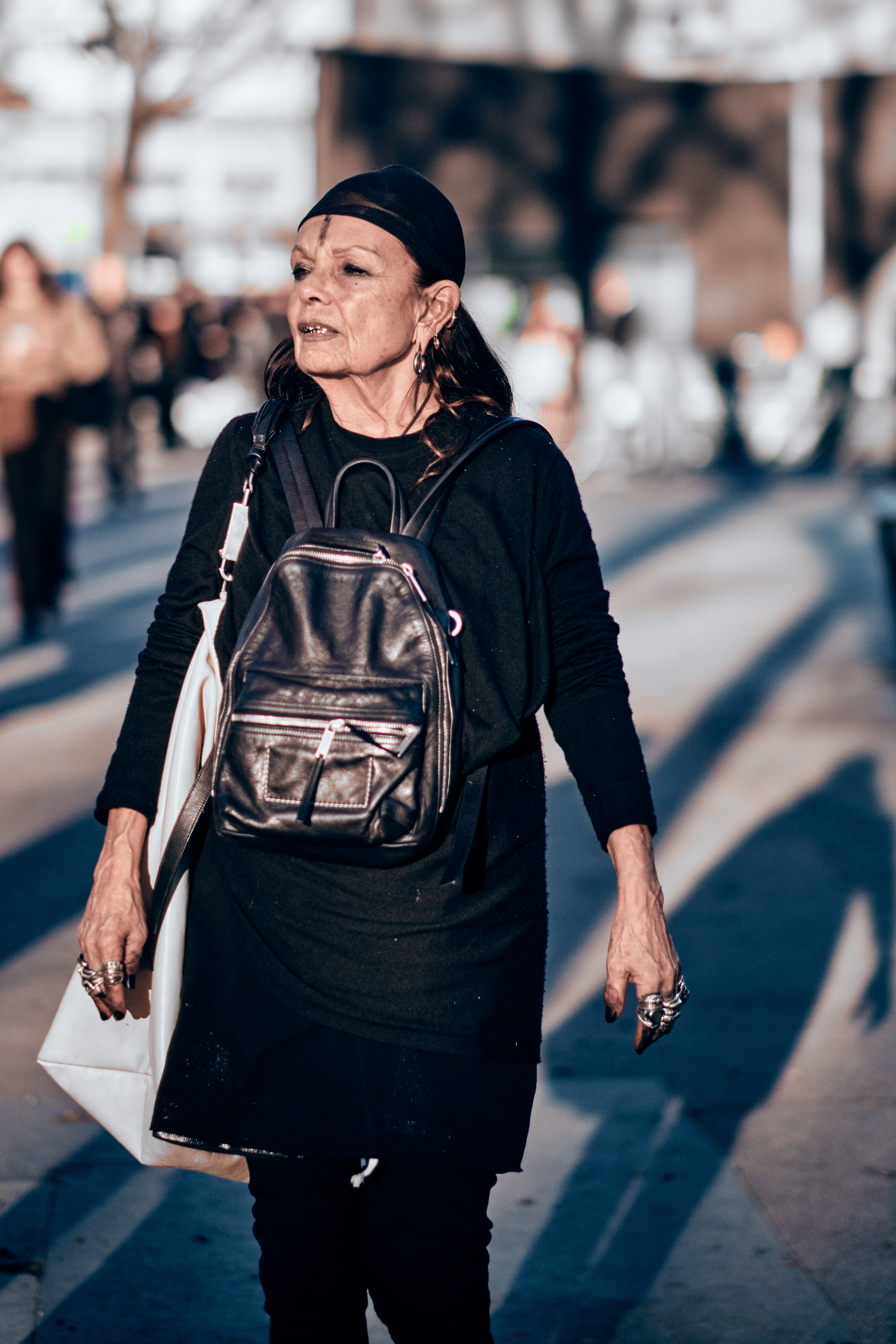
- Lamy at Paris Fashion Week 2019
- Born: 20 April 1944 (age 82); Jura, France
- Occupations: Performer
- Years active: 1990–present
- Spouses: Richard Newton (m. 1990; div. 2003); Rick Owens (m. 2006)
- Children: 1

Michèle Lamy (born 20 April 1944) is a French cultural and fashion figure and an entrepreneur. She has been a clothing designer, performer, restaurateur, lawyer, and film producer. She is the co-founding partner of Owenscorp and functions as the executive manager of Art/Furniture. Lamy has been photographed by Steven Klein, Mario Sorrenti, and other famous fashion photographers.

== Early life and education ==
Lamy was born in 1944 and raised in Jura, France. Her grandfather made accessories for one of France's most famous couturiers, Paul Poiret; her family owns an eyewear company.

As a teen in France, Lamy performed as a stripper at county fairs.

She went to law school, and during the '60s and '70s, worked as a criminal defense lawyer, while studying with the postmodern philosopher Gilles Deleuze. Lamy left the profession when she found herself more interested in her defendants than the lawyers practicing in the French legal system.

== Career ==
In 1979, Lamy moved to New York City. She made plastic jewelry and lived in the Hotel Chelsea during its punk heyday. Looking for something new, upon the urging of her brother, she settled in Los Angeles, where she continued to strip and eventually set up a fashion line and a retail store in the Beverly Center. She ran two cult restaurants/nightclubs, Café des Artistes and Les Deux Cafés, in 1996 with her first husband, experimental filmmaker Richard Newton. Les Deux hosted people like Madonna, Joni Mitchell, and Sharon Stone. Lamy and Newton lived in Hancock Park with their daughter, Scarlett Rouge. Lamy also produced Newton's first film.

In 1984, Lamy created her own clothing line called Lamy that became popular and was carried by luxury stores like I. Magnin. She hired Rick Owens in 1990 as a pattern cutter. When it became clear how much of a talent he was he became her business partner and eventually her companion and husband. In 2001, Lamy and Owens left Los Angeles to settle in Paris and got married in 2006. In 2004, the couple established their own fashion company Owenscorp, describing their business partnership as "asking a gypsy to organise a war with a fascist."

Lamy produces the furniture that bears the Owens brand. She also designs jewelry with American jewelry designer Loree Rodkin, whom she met in Los Angeles when she ran an eyewear store and Rodkin was a Hollywood agent. Lamy has appeared in FKA twigs and Black Asteroid music videos. She formed the band Lavascar with the artist Nico Vascellari and her daughter Scarlett Rouge.

In November 2010, Lamy posed for a shoot for Vogue Paris with the photographer Steven Klein. In 2013, Lamy was featured in Forbes with her daughter, now artist Scarlett Rouge. That year she reopened Café des Artistes in an art complex in Venice.

In 2015, Lamy was featured in a segment of FKA Twigs's short film for her EP M3LL155X after the English singer-songwriter asked to meet with her. Lamy appeared in the first section, Figure 8, in jewelry, wearing a headpiece with a luminous bulb imitating an anglerfish.

At the 2015 Venice Biennale, Lamy transformed an old container ship into a floating saloon. There she recorded songs with British electronica band Unkle and good friend A$AP Rocky, while on topside she, editors, and artists dined within various installations, talking. Rocky said about Lamy, "Hardly anyone knows how important you have been behind the scenes for my career. You did not just design my album covers, you took me to art fairs and showed me the art world."

In 2017, Lamy and Rick Owens were featured in SHOWstudio's editor-at-large and a freelance writer and curator Lou Stoppard's book about fashion's important and iconic duos, Fashion Together: Fashion's Most Extraordinary Duos on the Art of Collaboration. In the book, Owens said that Lamy was more his "mate" than "muse." And, "I don't think anyone would ever think of Michèle as a passive muse. I think that's why she sparks people's interest—because she doesn't fit the typical role of a muse." That year the furniture line she produces for Owens was shown at Museum of Contemporary Art, Los Angeles.

Lamy has practiced contactless boxing for 35 years. In 2018, she set up her own boxing gym, Lamyland, in Selfridges, London. The space previously was home to A$AP Rocky's AWGE Bodega. It is now reinvented every few months. In October 2018, Lamy curated a performance series featuring a tour of "Outsider Art Fair Paris" by British performance artist David Hoyle. In November she was a beauty centerfold for Dazed Digital.

In January 2019, Lamy held an installation piece Genius You in collaboration with Dutch photographer Paul Kooiker, taking place all around Selfridges, London. From May to November 2019, her boxing installation What Are We Fighting For? was shown in Venice Biennale. During November, Lamy participated in Performa 19 where she presented Before We Die created with Argentinian choreographer, dancer, and artist Cecilia Bengolea.

Lamy said about her approach to fashion and design:

"I like to really be with a lot of people and exchange ideas and the best way to be is to do something together, so I'm easily seduced… And when it's the idea or I want to lead a bunch of people somewhere and do something together, I think that's generous."

In 2020, Lamy collaborated with director and boxer Katya Bankowsky for Battle Royale, a series of short films shot in Dubai, the Venice Biennale, Overthrow Boxing Gym in New York, and on the boardwalk at Orchard Beach in the Bronx that feature Bankowsky and Lamy preparing for a fight.

In 2026, Lamy appeared as a guest judge on an episode of the eighth series of the reality competition series RuPaul's Drag Race UK.

== Personal life ==
Lamy has one daughter, artist Scarlett Rouge. Lamy is married to fashion designer Rick Owens, who is bisexual. Lamy is a smoker and is known for her gold teeth and ringed and Berber-inspired tattooed fingers dipped in black paint. She is opposed to having any plastic surgery. Lamy collects the work of Barry X Ball, Arthur Jafa, and Joel-Peter Witkin.

In a joint interview with Forbes in 2013, Scarlett said of her mother,

"There is a reason Michele's not fully an artist. She doesn't wanna go and sit in her pain. She doesn't want to suffer. She doesn't want to be vulnerable.... She's done so many different things. She didn't let anything get her down or stop her from moving on with life. To me, that's really inspiring."

When asked in this interview what she has for breakfast, Lamy answered, "black tea and cigarettes."
