= Rick Owens =

American fashion designer (born 1961)

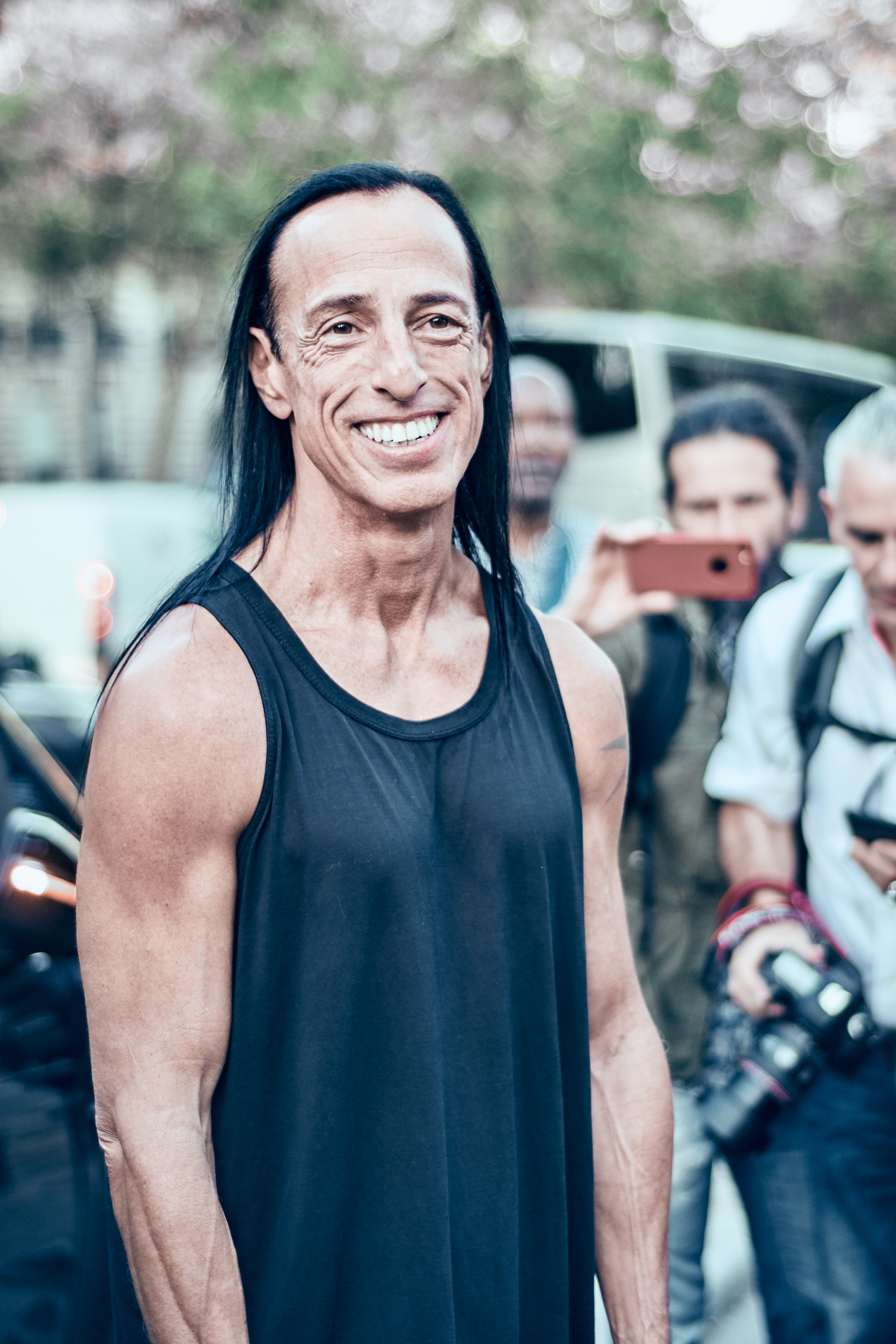
- Owens in 2018
- Born: Richard Saturnino Owens; November 18, 1961 (age 64); Porterville, California, U.S.
- Education: Otis College of Art and Design; Los Angeles Trade-Technical College
- Labels: Rick Owens; DRKSHDW; Rick Owens Lilies; Slab; Rick Owens Hun/HUNRICKOWENS
- Spouse: Michèle Lamy (m. 2006)

Richard Saturnino Owens (born November 18, 1961) is an American fashion designer from Porterville, California. In addition to his main line, Owens has a furniture line and a number of diffusion lines.

== Early life and education ==
Richard Saturnino Owens was raised in San Jose, California. His parents are John (d. 2015) and Concepción "Connie" Owens. His mother is Mexican. Owens was raised in a conservative, Catholic household. After graduating Porterville High School, he moved to Los Angeles, California to study art at Otis College of Art and Design for two years before taking pattern-making and draping courses at Los Angeles Trade-Technical College. This led to work in the garment industry, designing copies of designer clothing. Owens was introduced by his then-boyfriend Rick Castro to Michèle Lamy, who was well known in the Los Angeles social scene and owned the "Lamy" sportswear brand.

== Career ==
Owens launched his fashion line in 1994, operating out of a store in Hollywood Boulevard. One of the first boutiques to carry his clothes was Charles Gallay, who was known for carrying avant-garde designers. He gained notability after Kate Moss was photographed by Corrine Day for Vogue Paris in one of his signature leather jackets. According to Owens, the jacket was picked out by the fashion stylist Panos Yiapanis, likely after reading an article mentioning Owens in Dutch Magazine. This attention led to Vogue America sponsoring his first runway, which he titled "Sparrows FW02". Owens also attributes early support by Anna Wintour, editor-in-chief of Vogue, to a phone call made to him by André Leon Talley who was the editor-at-large of Vogue at the time.

He moved to Paris in 2003 with his partner Michèle Lamy, a decision that was partially motivated by being mugged in Los Angeles. He set up his home and atelier inside a historic five-story building that previously served as offices for former French President François Mitterrand. His runway collections have been mounted in Paris since then. In 2004, Owens and Michèle Lamy established their own fashion company Owenscorp, and described their business partnership as “asking a gypsy to organize a war with a fascist.”

In 2013, Owens exhibited his 'Prehistoric' collection at Carpenters Workshop Gallery in London. Owens' design color palette in this seven piece collection stretches from white to black, stopping nowhere in between. "The show is entitled 'Prehistoric' – a name that reflects its inspiration, the origins of humanity, it recalls a mysterious ancient civilization. Its aura is one of spiritual ritual, archaic ceremony and supreme power".

A recipient of the Council of Fashion Designers of America (CFDA) Perry Ellis Award for Emerging Talent in 2002 and the CFDA Lifetime Achievement Award in 2017, Owens was also awarded the Cooper-Hewitt Design Award for fashion design, as well as the Fashion Group International Rule Breaker Award in 2007. His first museum exhibition and retrospective, chronicling over 20 years of his life's work, entitled, "Subhuman Inhuman Superhuman" opened at the Triennale di Milano on December 15, 2017. In June 2019, Owens won Menswear Designer of the Year Award at the 2019 Council of Fashion Designers of America (CFDA) Fashion Awards.

Owens has authored four books — L'ai-je bien descendu? (2007), Rick Owens (2011), More Rick Owens (2023), and Rick Owens Furniture (2017), along with two books about Larry LeGaspi, which were published in November 2019 by Rizzoli.

He had launched five labels including RICK OWENS, DRKSHDW, RICKOWENSLILIES, SLAB, and HUNRICKOWENS (previously "Palais Royal"). SLAB was a diffusion line that consisted of basic garments with unique finishings such as distressing, oil washing, and waxed coatings. This line was later replaced by his DRKSHDW line in 2005, which would continue the focus on basic garments with cellulose fabrics.

In 2018 and 2019, he has collaborated with Birkenstock and French sneaker brand Veja, respectively. The latter collaboration continued for five seasons, with its conclusion announced in November 2021. Owens added to this series of partnerships in 2020, designing capsule collections in collaboration with Moncler and American activewear brand Champion. In 2021, Owens would collaborate with footwear brands Dr. Martens and Converse. In a 2017 interview with WWD, the brand was reported to have brought in $120 million the previous year. Owens noted in the same interview that his label planned to remain independent from corporate investment.

In 2019, Owens dedicated his autumn/winter collection, "Larry" to Larry LeGaspi, the eminent designer he considers his creative forefather. He discussed the influence of LeGaspi's work on his own in publicly available shownotes; "For me, as a teenager growing up in Porterville, California, what Larry LeGaspi did was a huge thing—the way he infiltrated middle America with this subversive sensibility [...] [h]e connects with soul culture—black soul culture and music [...] [a]ll of this stuff coming together was very important to this kid in Porterville." And, "I do think of Larry’s as a kind of biblical story... about the glory of lust and vice, something I talk about a lot, but also about dissipation and decline—which I also talk about a lot... When I was 15, I wanted to be dissipated. And now I am, a little bit. But there is also responsibility." In November 2019, Owens returned to Los Angeles for the first time in 16 years to introduce the books.

In 2025, Owens entitled his retrospective exhibition at Palais Galliera Paris "Temple of Love" in specific reference to The Sisters of Mercy song "Temple of Love".

== Personal life ==
Owens is bisexual. Owens married the French designer Michèle Lamy in 2006.

== Notable collections ==
Rick Owens typically produces a menswear and womenswear collection each season. These collections often share the same title and theme.

=== MONSTERS SS98 ===
His Spring/Summer 1998 collection marks his first recorded fashion collection. This collection utilized his signature draping and bias cut patterning he was noted for. Owens used materials such as silks, leathers, and furs for his garments. Imagery for the collection featured American drag queen The Goddess Bunny, who also worked for Owens as a fit model in his studio. This collection is notable for including transgender models and sex workers in the documentation of the collection.

=== SPARROWS FW02 ===
His Fall/Winter collection entitled "Sparrows FW02" was his debut runway show at New York Fashion Week. This show was sponsored by Vogue magazine. He was originally slated to show his previous "Vapor SS02" collection, but due to the terrorist attacks of September 11, it had to be delayed. This collection exhibited his draped and tailored designs that he gained popularity for in the Hollywood Boulevard in a muted color palette. It was a minimalistic presentation, contrasting his later shows that would feature extravagant set-pieces and performances.

=== DUSTULATOR FW06 ===
Owens presented his Fall/Winter 2006 collection at Pitti Uomo in Florence with three segments. The first, DUSTULATOR, was a menswear runway collection. The collection was inspired by military and post-apocalyptic aesthetics with exaggerated and oversized treatments. The greyscale color palette was complimented with diluted, cool-toned knitwear. The collection was notable for debuting a fully-realized version of his athletic-inspired sneaker previously seen in his "Moog FW05" collection. The second part of his presentation, DUSTDAM, was an installation space exhibiting thirty garments from his new collection alongside his in-house furniture. The garments were on a wooden display thirty meters in length. The final segment, DUSTPUMP, was a life-sized wax sculpture of Owens urinating onto mirrors and sand. The statue is now installed at his flagship Paris store.

=== VICIOUS SS14 ===
Owens' Spring/Summer 2014 womenswear collection had a team of forty step dancers with members from The Zetas, Washington Divas, Soul Steppers and The Momentums sororities as runway models. Their dance performance, accented with "grit face" expressions, was done in lieu of a typical runway presentation. They had trained for the runway performance for six months. Owens also intended for this collection to be more inclusive with body representation. This fashion show also marked the debut of his collaboration with Adidas that lasted for several seasons. The footwear designs took cues from Adidas' own designs reworked with Owens' design language of exaggerating shapes and proportions. The footwear collaboration was a commercial success and brought Rick Owens further into the mainstream, adding to the success and press of the fashion show itself.

=== BABEL SS19 ===
The Spring/Summer 2019 collection makes references to the Russian constructivist architecture movement and the biblical Tower of Babel. The collection was shown at Palais de Tokyo in Paris with a tower the center of the runway bearing inspiration to Tatlin's Tower. Owens used this collection's influences to incorporate geometric silhouettes and design lines into his garments, and included unconventional materials such as removable tent poles to achieve this. This collection also was the first time Owens collaborated with ECCO Leather by using their translucent leather for footwear and apparel.

=== PORTERVILLE FW24 ===
Owens' Fall/Winter 2024 collection pays homage to his hometown of Porterville, California and was displayed at his house and headquarters in Paris. In the collection's display, models walked around the halls of the house while members of the audience gathered along the walls. Owens experimented with a number of distinctive silhouettes, including stoles, shoulder pads, and boots. Notably, this collection introduced inflatable knee-high rubber boots, distinctive for their large volume and rounded shape.

== Controversies ==
=== Exposed models during the Fall/Winter 2015 menswear show ===
The menswear "Sphinx FW15" runway featured garments that were intentionally draped and patterned to reveal the model's genitalia. Each model was carefully chosen based on his height and proportions so that the fabric would not reveal too much or too little of his groin. Owens stated in an interview he was inspired by the male nudity of classical marble sculptures for this collection.

=== Model scandal during the Spring/Summer 2016 menswear show ===
During the "Cyclops SS16" menswear show in Paris, male fashion muse, artist, and musician Jera Diarc, who worked for Owens as a model, held up a sign that read, "Please Kill Angela Merkel. Not." This action overshadowed the entire week, gained worldwide attention, and went viral. There was a lot of speculation regarding whether this was political activism, an art performance, or a simple stunt on Jera's part, or was deliberately staged as part of the show's theme of "protest and male aggression". Owens distanced himself from it and stressed that he and his company had not known anything about it in advance; he also banned Jera from his shows. Owens went on to call Jera his muse in several statements which he gave afterwards.

When Jera was asked about the incident in an interview with the magazine Highsnobiety, he was vague and did not reveal exactly what he had been aiming for with the stunt. He ended the interview with the statement, "Everything for rckNrll. Everything for art. Everything for the cause. And the cause is above everything."

=== Rick Owens "Dunk" Sneaker ===
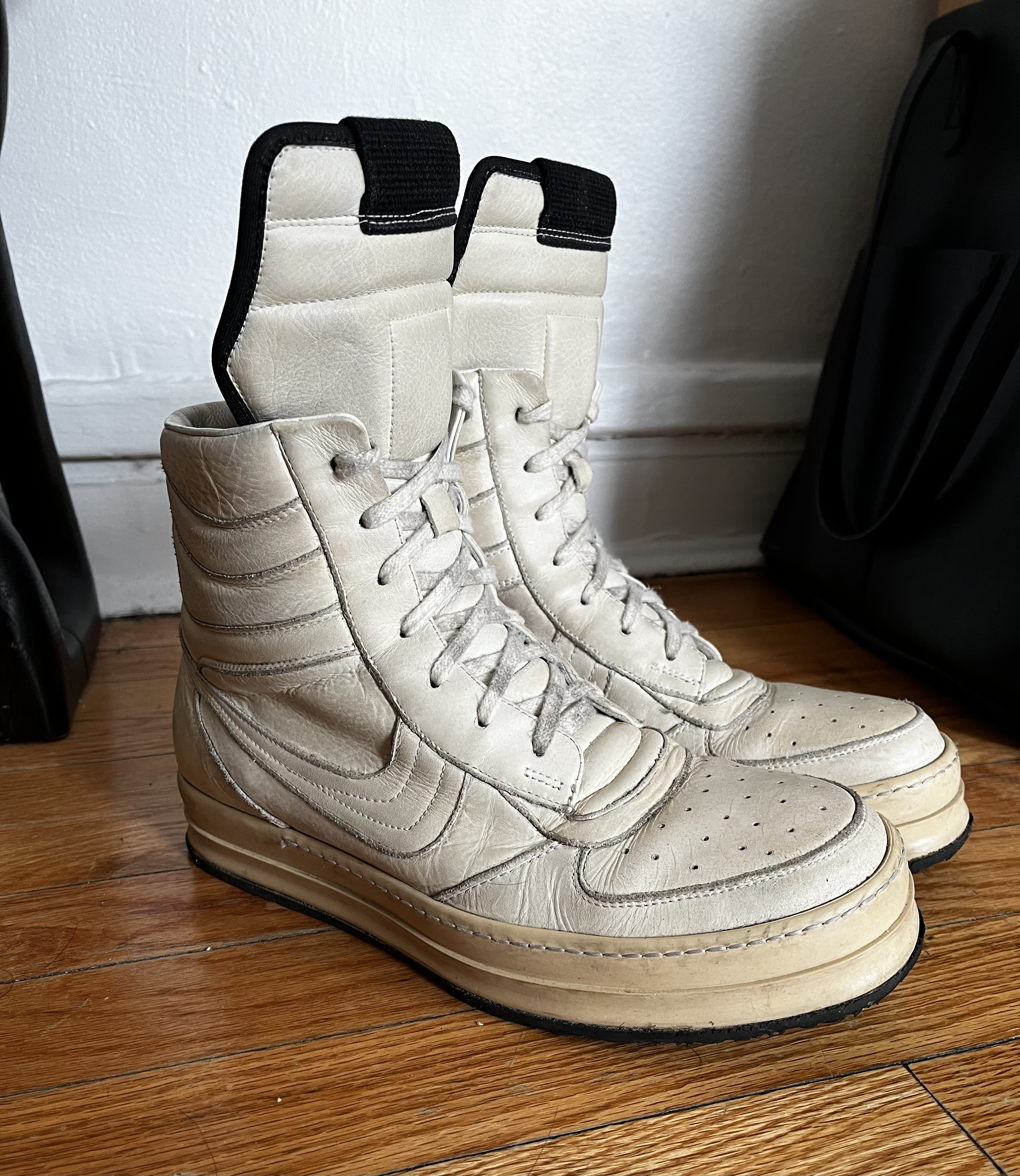
"Dunk" sneaker

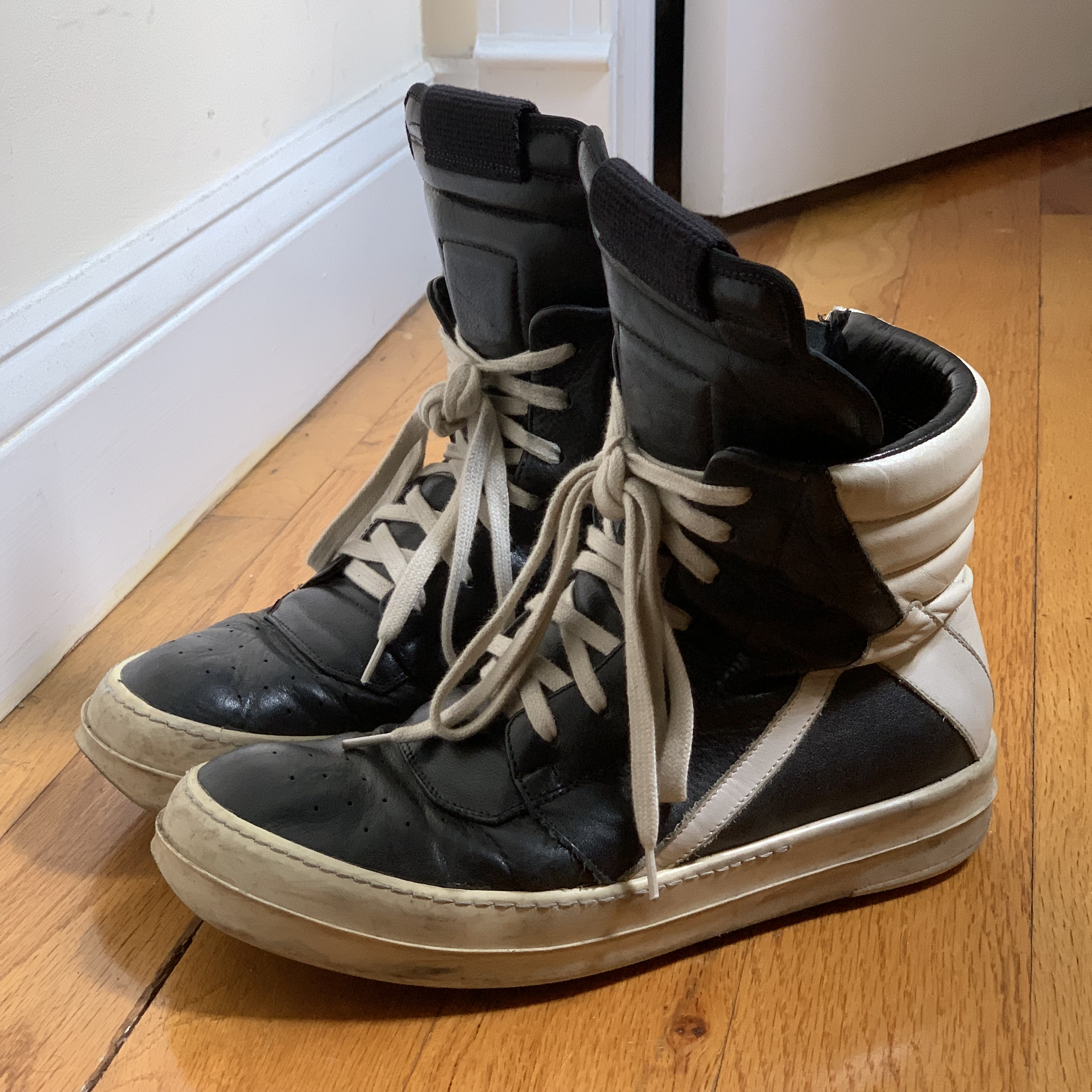
"Geobasket" sneaker

Owens' most notable attempt at producing an in-house sneaker was first unveiled during his "Moog FW05" collection. It featured an exaggerated tongue, a padded collar, a crepe sole with a rubber sidewall stitched and reinforced with staples at the heel, and a medial zipper for ease of access. He stated his intention for this athletic-inspired high-top sneaker was to create "monster trucks" for your feet. The most notable design aspect was an appliqué that resembled a Nike Swoosh and the Puma stripe logo. His following collection, "Dustulator FW06", received critical acclaim and featured the fully-realized version of his new sneaker. A later version of the sneaker was inspired by the Adidas logo for his "Crust FW09" collection. Colloquially known as the "Dunk" due to its resemblance to Nike's sneaker of the same name, Owens stated in an interview that he received a cease and desist letter from Nike regarding his footwear design. Despite the alleged letter sent from Nike, the sneaker was available in its original form for retail sale as late as 2010. The Rick Owens "Dunk" sneaker was then replaced by the Geobasket sneaker which features no potentially infringing design elements, and instead features geometric panels.

=== Use of animal fur ===
In December 2025, Owens and Owenscorp faced protests by the Coalition to Abolish the Fur Trade for continuing to promote items containing real animal fur despite animal cruelty concerns. On December 15, 2025, after five days of protests, Owenscorp removed fur products from its website and stated that it would no longer engage in fur production going forward.

== Furniture line ==
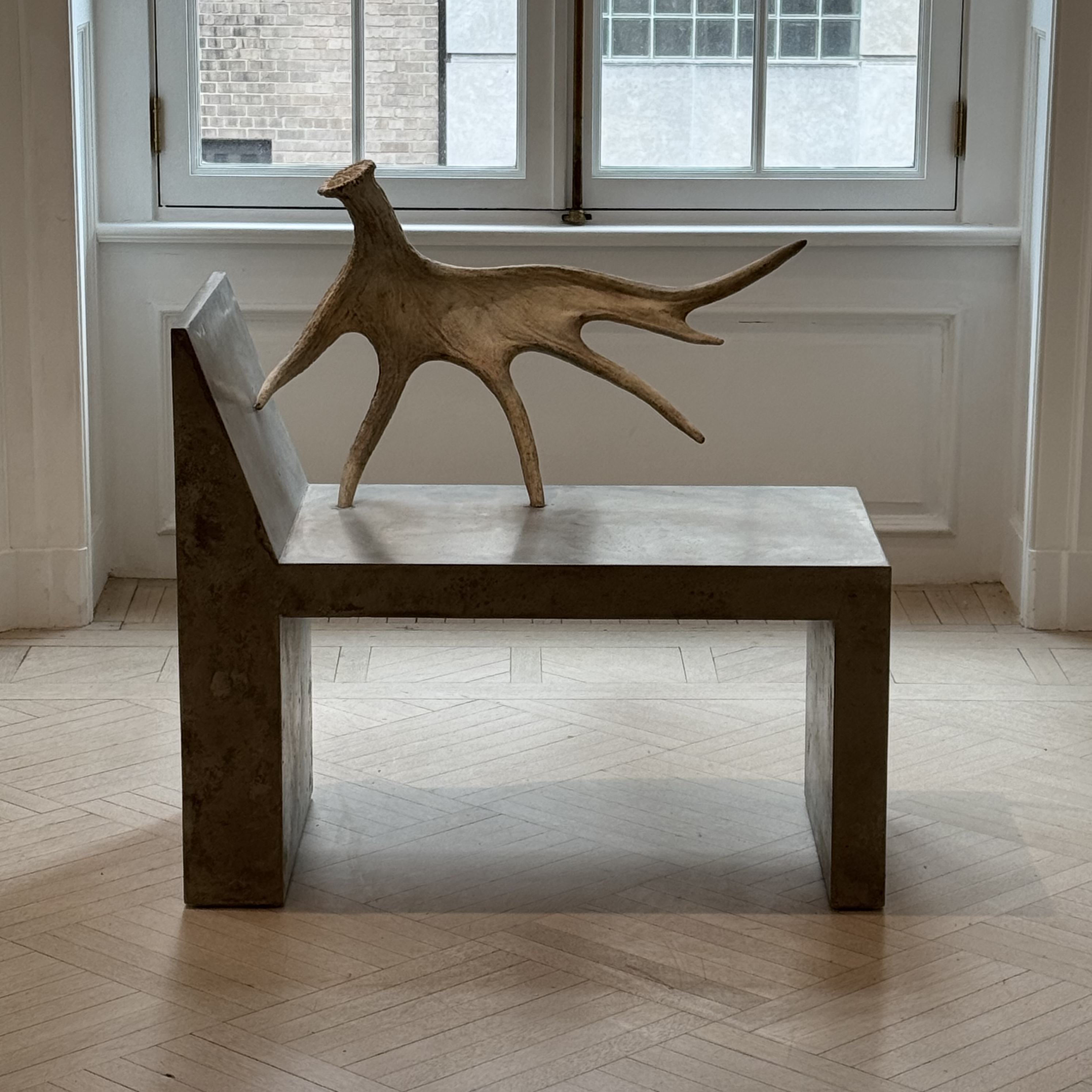
Rick Owens Tomb chair with moose antler

In addition to designing clothes, Owens designs furniture. His furniture was originally custom-designed and tailored for his own use while in Paris. Owens's furniture line is influenced by architectural elements such as Brutalism and German World War II bunkers, characterized by angular movements and sculptural forms. He occasionally incorporates a pair of antlers, mimicking asymmetric wings to a pair of chairs. Galerie Philia has exhibited some of his works.

His first furniture show in Berlin was made possible by the publisher, Angelika Taschen. Taschen has known Owens and his wife since they lived in Los Angeles. Taschen included his Parisian living space in her book, New Paris Interiors. She was taken away by Owens's eye for furniture design and wanted his work to be showcased in her hometown, Berlin. The Berlin Gallery Weekend 2010 took place from April 30 to May 2 in which 40 galleries mounted new exhibitions. Presented by Taschen, Owens's show, ‘To Pop A Boner,’ was on display at the famous Apartment store.

In July 2005, Owens introduced a furniture collection. Using raw plywood, marble, alabaster, bronze, leather, and moose antlers, the collection is inspired by his favorite shapes from Eileen Gray to Brâncuși to California skate parks. The furniture collection has since been shown at the Musée d'Art modern in Paris and the Museum of Contemporary Art, Los Angeles. Owens credits his wife, Michèle Lamy, as the creative force behind his furniture show. The exhibit showcases new works as well as classic pieces, in which some were envisioned for this newest store located in Soho, New York. The couple has worked together throughout the design process for his furniture line. Owens comes up with the drawings in which Lamy then creates the preliminary models for. Before his wife hires artisans to create the final pieces, the two carve, re-proportion, and make any adjustments beforehand. Owens leaves the installation process in Lamy's hands, who writes the summaries for the pieces as well.
