= Frederick's of Hollywood =

Retailer of women's lingerie in the United States

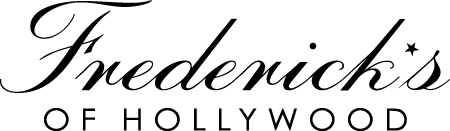

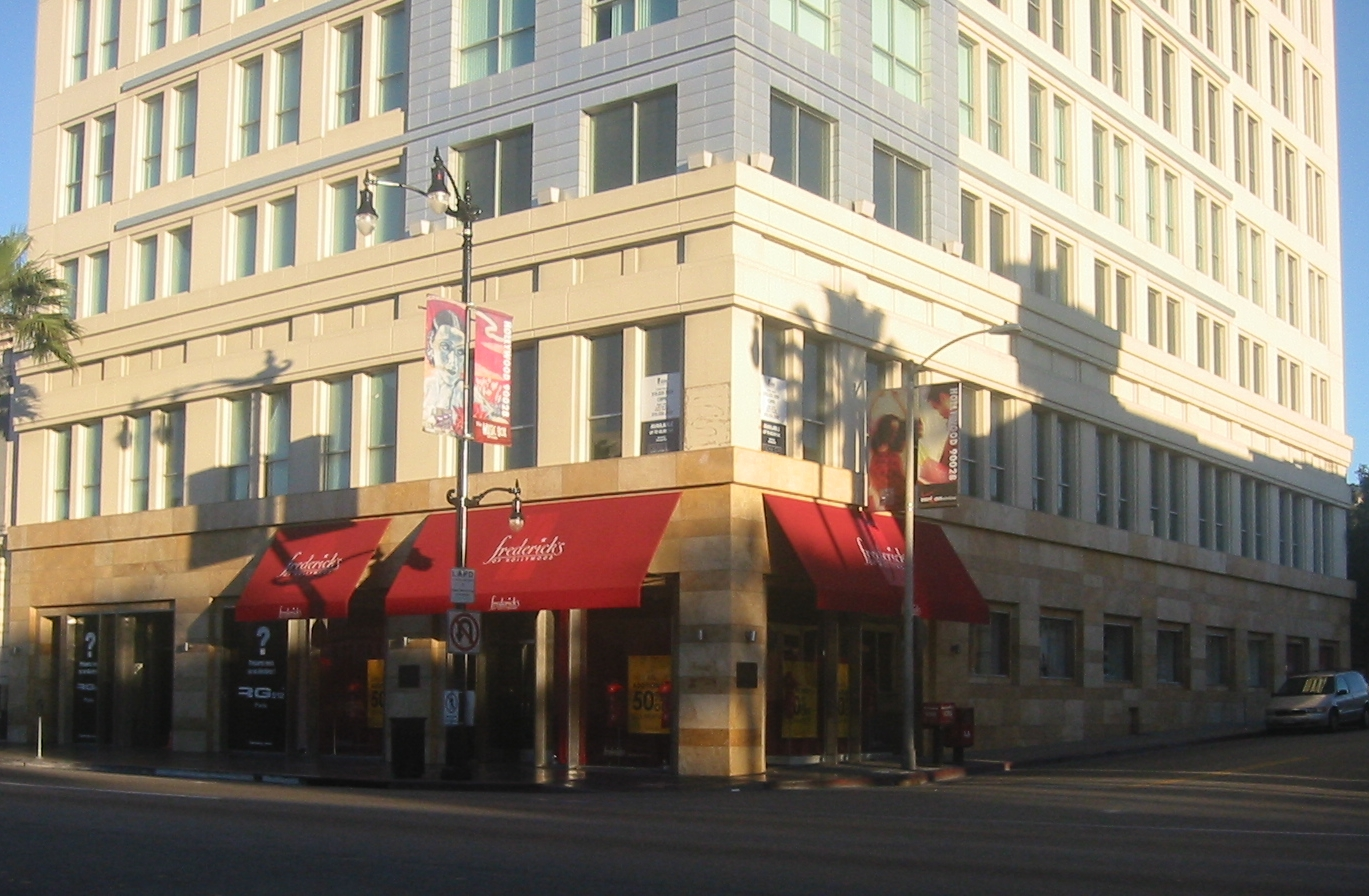
- Former Frederick's of Hollywood store on Hollywood Boulevard
- Type: Subsidiary
- Industry: Clothing
- Founded: 1947; 79 years ago
- Founder: Frederick Mellinger
- Headquarters: United States
- Products: Lingerie
- Parent: Authentic Brands Group
- Website: fredericks.com

Frederick's of Hollywood is an American lingerie brand formerly with stores in shopping malls across the United States. In 2015, all 111 retail stores were closed before a bankruptcy filing. The brand was acquired by Authentic Brands Group and was relaunched as an online-only store, FOH Online Corp. In 2018, Naked Brand Group, Inc. acquired FOH Online Corp.

== History and operations ==
Frederick's of Hollywood was started in 1946 by Frederick Mellinger, inventor of the push-up bra, edible panty, and other garments whose main attributes were that they were see-through and could be removed quickly. Frederick's began in a Fifth Avenue loft in New York City, where it sold bras, panties, corsets, bedroom slippers, hosiery, bridal lingerie, special occasion lingerie, and more.

The business moved to the West Coast in 1947, where their flagship store was a landmark in Hollywood. Some of the lingerie worn by the 1950s pin-up Bettie Page was from Frederick's of Hollywood. The company was the market leader in lingerie until the 1980s when it was overtaken by Victoria's Secret. By 1996, the company had 200 stores across the country.

In 2000, the company filed for Chapter 11 bankruptcy; they emerged from bankruptcy in 2003. In 2005, the flagship store moved to the corner of Hollywood Boulevard and Highland Avenue. In 2006, the company merged with Movie Star and their headquarters was moved back to New York. In 2008, Frederick's of Hollywood changed its name to Frederick's of Hollywood Group Inc.

In 2014, Frederick's of Hollywood was taken private by Harbinger Group and other investors. In 2015, the company closed its stores and filed for Chapter 11 bankruptcy again. Authentic Brands Group then acquired the company's brand and online operations. In 2018, the online operations were acquired by Naked Brand Group Inc.

== Museum ==
Lingerie Museum
- Established: 1986 or 1987
- Dissolved: 2005
- Location: 6608 W. Hollywood Boulevard, Hollywood, California
- Coordinates: 34.101°N 118.334°W
- Founder: Frederick's of Hollywood

Frederick's of Hollywood opened The Lingerie Museum in its flagship store in Hollywood, California in 1986 or 1987. The museum contained the company's brassiere collection, exhibits on the history of lingerie from 1946 to present, and the Celebrity Lingerie Hall of Fame.

The Celebrity Lingerie Hall of Fame featured underwear worn by celebrities, either in media or their private apparel. Items on display included the lace bra and panties worn by Zsa Zsa Gabor in Lili, a petticoat worn by Ava Gardner in Show Boat, a push-up bra worn by Katey Sagal in Married... with Children, pantaloons worn by Ava Gardner, a slip worn by Lana Turner, a nightgown worn by Judy Garland, a peignoir worn by Mae West for Life, a bra worn by Natalie Wood in Bob & Carol & Ted & Alice, the garter belt worn by Susan Sarandon in Bull Durham, the underwear of the entire cast of Beverly Hills 90210, boxer shorts worn by Tom Hanks in Forrest Gump, a dress worn by Milton Berle in Texaco Star Theater, a training bra used by Phyllis Diller, crossdressing items worn by Tony Curtis in Some Like It Hot, and the bustier worn by Madonna in her music video for "Open Your Heart". According to company spokeswoman Ellen Appel, Madonna's bustier was the museum's most popular item.

The museum drew national media attention when it was looted during the 1992 Los Angeles riots. Three items were stolen: Madonna's bustier, Katey Sagal's push-up bra, and Ava Gardner's pantaloons. Gardner's and Sagal's pieces were later returned, but Madonna's was not despite a $1,000 ($2,464 in 2025) reward. Madonna gave the museum a replacement in exchange for a $10,000 donation to charity.

The museum closed in 2005 when Frederick's of Hollywood moved their flagship store. In 2011, CNN listed the Celebrity Lingerie Hall of Fame as one of the world's weirdest museums.
