= FabricLive.12 =

Compilation album by Bugz in the Attic
- Released: October 6, 2003
- Genre: Broken beat
- Label: Fabric
- Producer: Bugz in the Attic

Bugz in the Attic chronology
FabricLive.12 (2003)	Got the Bug: the Bugz in the Attic Remixes Collection (2004)

FabricLive chronology
FabricLive.11 (2003)	FabricLive.12 (2003)	FabricLive.13 (2003)

FabricLive.12 is a DJ mix compilation album by English electronic music group Bugz in the Attic, released as part of the FabricLive mix series.

== Track listing ==
1. Umod – Tromboline – Dominic Stanton
2. Kaidi Tatham & Dego – Got Me Puzzled – 2000 Black
3. Nutmeg – Bicycle Kick – Neroli
4. Focus – Having Your Fun (4 Hero Rework) – Versatile
5. Artwork – Red – Big Apple
6. Seiji ft Lyric L – Loose Lips – Bitasweet
7. Daluq – Oriental Express – Soulja
8. Vikter Duplaix – Looking For Love (Bugz in the Attic Remix) – Hollywood
9. Nu Design – Time To Skyank – Zed Bias
10. dkd – Future Rage – Bitasweet/2000 Black
11. Alison David – Dreams Come True (Afronaught Mix) – Fresh Air
12. Trouble Man – Strike Hard – Far Out Recordings
13. Daft Punk – Harder, Better, Faster, Stronger (The Neptunes Remix) – Virgin
14. N'Dambi – Call Me (Re-Edit) – Cheeky Recordings
