= Movie Star (company) =

Movie Star, Inc. is a New York City-based manufacturer, marketer and seller of lingerie, sleepwear and other types of clothing. Organized in 1935 and formerly known as Sanmark Stardust, Inc., the company became Movie Star, Inc. in 1992. It was acquired by Frederick's of Hollywood in 2006, who sold the company to Dolce Vita Intimates in 2010.

In 1986, on December 11, it was announced in Women's Wear Daily that Sanmark Stardust, Inc., acquired the rights to feature Terrytoon cartoon characters in its sleepwear designs from Viacon Enterprises. The magazine stated that the agreement covered all of Terrytoon's characters to be featured, including Mighty Mouse and Heckle and Jeckle.
