= Andy Cato =

English musician and producer (born 1972)

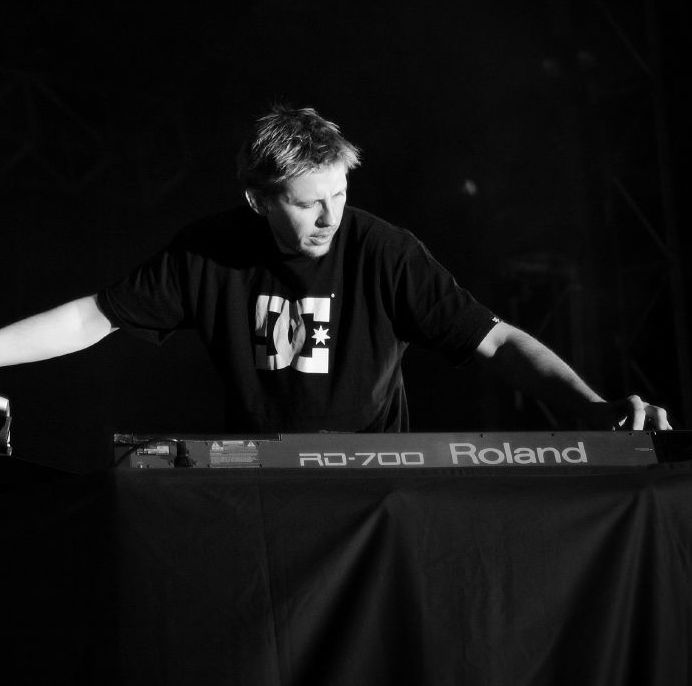
- Cato performing with Groove Armada in 2007

Background information
- Also known as: Caia; Journey Man DJ; Andy Cocup; Big C; The system; Seventh Sense
- Born: Andrew Derek Cocup; 11 December 1972 (age 53); Barnsley, Yorkshire, England
- Origin: London, England
- Genre: Electronic
- Instruments: Keyboards; synthesizers; trombone; bass
- Years active: 1996–present
- Label: Columbia UK

Andrew Derek Cocup (born 11 December 1972), known professionally as Andy Cato, is an English musician, record producer, DJ, and farmer who is currently one half of the electronic music band Groove Armada, the other half being Tom Findlay. He was also involved with Rachel Foster in Weekend Players, another electronic dance group, between 2001 and 2004. His stage name of Cato derives from Cato Road in Clapham, South London, where he lived.

== Early life ==
Cato grew up in Badsworth, near Pontefract, and played the trombone in the Grimethorpe Colliery Band, as well as the Doncaster Youth Jazz Orchestra and won the Young Jazz Musician of the Year Award in 1996. He was educated at Queen Elizabeth Grammar School, a private school for boys in Wakefield, followed by Merton College, Oxford, where he read Modern History. At school, he was a prolific musician, frequently performing and leading school shows such as the Carol concert or as a pianist at school assembly. From an early age, he often wrote his own songs, such as "Christmas means to me - presents round the tree".

== Groove Armada ==
After Oxford, he moved to London, where he began acting as a disc jockey at nightclubs such as Fabric where he started in the upstairs bar, and composing music. He set up the label Skinny Malinky, which produced records under various aliases included Big C, Mother's Pride, Vadis, Beat Foundation, Fatback Boogaloo and Qattara (with Alex Whitcombe).

He formed the band Groove Armada after he met Tom Findlay in 1994 in Cambridge, through a common friend who was Jo, his girlfriend at the time, who later became his wife. In London they had a dance night called Captain Sensual at the Helm of the Groove Armada. In 2003 they started the Lovebox Festival, named after the club night they started in London venue 93 Feet East in 2002.

Groove Armada performed a farewell tour of Australia and New Zealand in 2022.

== Personal life ==
In 2008, Cato moved with his wife and two children, Nina and Theo, to Gascony in France. In 2013, using the proceeds of selling the rights to his Groove Armada songs, they acquired a 100-hectare farm, where they now grow organic no-till crops and raise livestock in pasture. Cato is now a full-time farmer, but he still finds time to DJ, with occasional gigs in the UK and Ibiza and regular DIY releases.

In 2022, Cato took on the 25-year lease of a National Trust farm in Oxfordshire, using the techniques and non-intrusive farming skills used in France. Cato appears alongside his Wildfarmed business partner George Lamb in series 3 of Clarkson's Farm.
