= Bugz in the Attic =

English DJ collective

Bugz in the Attic is a collective of DJs and producers based in West London, who are prominent in broken beat. The collective included Orin Walters (Afronaut), Paul Dolby (Seiji), Kaidi Tatham, Daz-I-Kue, Alex Phountzi (Neon Phusion), Cliff Scott, Mark Force and Matt Lord. The collective founded in late 96' also had a label, BitaSweet Records, and a studio, The BitaSuite. The group also ran its own Co-Op club night at Plastic People in Shoreditch, London. They had released numerous singles as well as remixes and compilations. Their debut album Back in the Doghouse was released in July 2006, on V2 Records.

The group contributed a track titled "Zombie (Part One)" to the Red Hot Organization's tribute album to Fela Kuti, Red Hot and Riot. They also remixed the Zero 7 song "Distractions".

Their single "Booty La La" reached #44 on the UK Singles Chart in January 2005.

2025 – The collective now has two remaining members, Afronaut and Mark Force AKA AfroForce.

== Discography ==
- FabricLive.12 (2003)
- Got the Bug: the Bugz in the Attic Remixes Collection (2004)
- Life: Styles (2005)
- Back in the Doghouse (2006)
- Back to Mine: Bugz in the Attic (2007)
- Got the Bug 2: Bugz in the Attic Remixes Collection Pt ll (2009)
