= Jazz Kitchen =

Jazz club and restaurant in Indianapolis, Indiana, US

Coordinates: 39.8509°N 86.1455°W

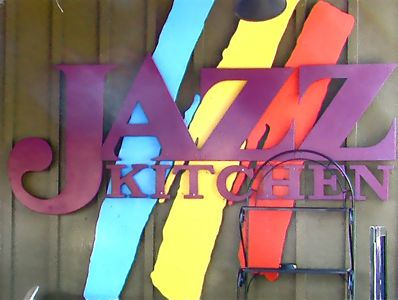
The Jazz Kitchen

The Jazz Kitchen is a prominent jazz club and restaurant in Indianapolis, Indiana. The club showcases local, regional and national jazz acts. The Jazz Kitchen opened in 1994 at the former location of The Place to Start at 54th Street and College Avenue in the Meridian-Kessler/South Broad Ripple neighborhood. Voted one of the top 100 jazz clubs in the world in 2009 by Down Beat magazine, the Jazz Kitchen is owned by David Allee, son of jazz musician and composer Steve Allee.

2009 brought some significant changes to Jazz Kitchen. In 2009, the jazz club adopted a "smoke-free" policy. And in February 2009, the corporate partnership of the Jazz Kitchen, Owl Studios and the Indianapolis Jazz Foundation under the moniker Indy Jazz Fest Corp. took over production of the Indy Jazz Fest, an annual festival held in June. As a foodie destination, the Jazz Kitchen received an OpenTable’s 2012 Diner’s Choice award listing among the Top 100 Late-Night Dining Restaurants in the country

The club features local and touring musicians. Many acclaimed musicians have performed at Jazz Kitchen, including Joshua Redman, Brad Mehldau, Christian McBride, Victor Wooten, Larry Coryell, Lavay Smith, Pharez Whitted, Jon Faddis, Kathy Kosins, Yellowjackets, Frank Glover, Joey DeFrancesco, Terence Blanchard, J. J. Johnson, Simone, Preservation Hall Jazz Band and Ray Brown.

== Notable performances ==
Notable performances have included:

- J. J. Johnson's three nights as leader of his final group in March 1995 before his retirement.
- Harry Connick Jr.'s combo performances in May 2002. Connick's performance prompted the club to hire a security guard for the first time.

== Gallery ==
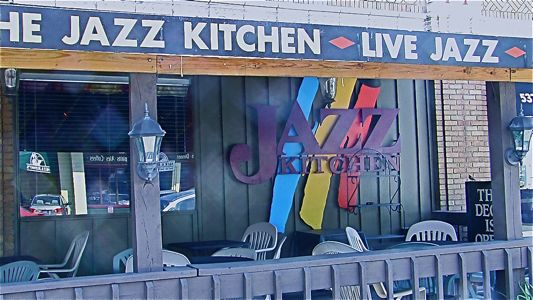
Store front of the Jazz Kitchen

== See also ==
- List of jazz venues in the United States
- List of attractions and events in Indianapolis
