= More Mr. Nice Guy =

Studio album by Garaj Mahal
- Released: 2010
- Recorded: March 2009
- Studio: Owl Studios
- Genre: Jazz fusion, funk
- Length: 64:11
- Label: Owl
- Producer: Garaj Mahal

Garaj Mahal chronology
Mondo Garaj (2003)	More Mr. Nice Guy (2010)	w00t (2008)

Professional ratings
Review scores
Source	Rating
All About Jazz	4/5 stars
AllMusic	3.5/5 stars
The Philadelphia Inquirer	B+

More Mr. Nice Guy is a studio album by United States-based fusion band Garaj Mahal, released in 2010.

== Critical reception ==
AllMusic wrote that "the quartet weaves through various strains of clearly identifiable commercial music while retaining its trailblazing spirit, making for a total listening experience appropriate for many different moods." The Philadelphia Inquirer called the album "robust," writing that "fans of electric jazz-fusion guitar masters like John McLaughlin, Pat Metheny and Larry Coryell should definitely get on board."

== Track listing ==
No.	Title	Length
1.	"Witch Doctor"	5:36
2.	"Faster Than the Speed of Time"	0:46
3.	"Tachyonics"	8:07
4.	"The Long Form"	10:41
5.	"Today"	5:22
6.	"Frankly Frankie Ford"	9:17
7.	"What My Friends Say"	5:17
8.	"Chester the Pester"	10:06
9.	"Alison's Pony"	8:59

== Personnel ==
- Fareed Haque – guitar
- Sean Rickman – drums & vocals
- Eric Levy – keyboards
- Kai Eckhardt – bass
