= Platinum (The Headhunters album) =

Studio album by The Headhunters
- Released: June 14, 2011
- Recorded: Spring 2011
- Studio: The Static Shack, Indianapolis; Baba Bill's Studio, New Orleans; Nolan Smith Studios, Los Angeles
- Genre: Jazz fusion, jazz-funk
- Length: 70:44
- Label: Owl Studios
- Producer: Mike Clark, Bill Summers

The Headhunters chronology
Evolution Revolution (2003)	Platinum (2011)

Platinum is an album by the jazz fusion band The Headhunters that was released in 2011. The album combines jazz and hip hop.

== Track listing ==
1. "Platinum Intro" (:50)
2. "Mission Statement" (4:01)
3. "Reality of It" (:17)
4. "Salamander" (7:09)
5. "I Predict a Good year" (:11)
6. "D-Funk (Funk With Us)" (4:48)
7. "I Feel Really Good About" (:10)
8. "Tracie" (6:01)
9. "Rehearse Everybody" (:13)
10. "Paging Mr. Wesley" (5:31)
11. "M Trane" (8:48)
12. "Apple Tree" (5:18)
13. "Palm Nut" (6:53)
14. "Years of Touring" (:10)
15. "Congo Place" (4:55)
16. "On the Road" (:16)
17. "Head Hunting" (4:48)
18. "Skizness" (3:50)
19. "Soul Glow" (5:29)
20. "Platinum Outro" (:42)

== Personnel ==
- Rob Dixon – soprano, alto, and tenor saxophones, keyboards
- Azar Lawrence – soprano saxophone
- Bennie Maupin – soprano and tenor saxophones
- Donald Harrison – alto saxophone, Moog bass, keyboards
- Derrick Gardner – trumpet
- PJ Yinger – trumpet
- Kyle Roussel – keyboards
- Patrice Rushen – keyboards
- Gary Mielke – keyboards, bass, Moog bass
- Richie Goods – bass
- Jerry Stucker – guitar
- Mike Clark – drums
- Bill Summers – percussion, vocals
- George Clinton – vocals
- Cynthia Layne – vocals
- Alexei Marti – timbales, vocals
- Snoop Dogg – rap
- Jaecyn Bayne – rap
- Private Pile – rap
- Killah Priest – rap
