= Rob Dixon =

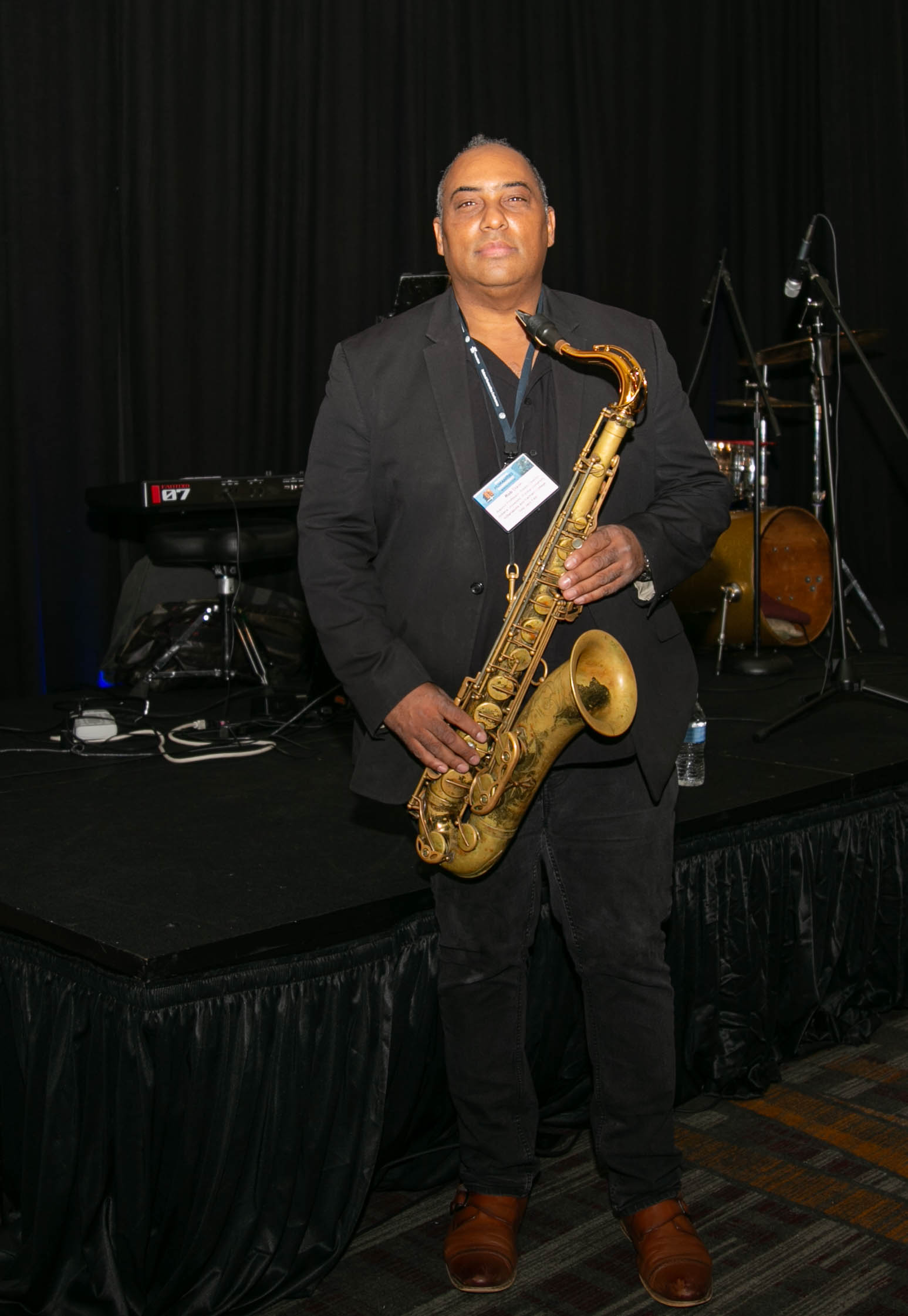
- Dixon at the 2023 National Humanities Conference

Background information
- Born: Atlanta, Georgia, U.S.
- Genres: Jazz, fusion, jazz-funk, jazz rap
- Occupation: Musician
- Instrument: Saxophone
- Years active: 1996–current
- Label: Owl
- Website: www.reverbnation.com/robdixon

Rob Dixon is an American jazz saxophonist based in Indianapolis. Dixon is known for his work as a recording artist and artistic director.

== Career ==
Dixon graduated from Indiana University's Jacobs School of Music. After graduation, Dixon spent several years working in the New York jazz scene. He returned to Indianapolis in 2003, where he worked with a number of organizations, such as the Cleveland Heritage Jazz Orchestra and the Buselli-Wallarab Jazz Orchestra.

He has released two albums on Owl Studios as a bandleader: What Things Could Be (2006) and Reinvention: The Dixon-Rhyne Project (2008).

In addition, Dixon is often featured as a sideman with other Owl Studios recording artists, including Derrick Gardner & the Jazz Prophets, the Buselli-Wallarab Jazz Orchestra, Cynthia Layne, Steve Allee, Mike Clark, and The Headhunters.

Outside of recording, Dixon has served several community initiatives promoting jazz. In 2023, Indiana University Indianapolis' Center for Africana Studies appointed him as its artist in residence through the 2024-2025 academic year. Dixon currently serves as the artistic director for Indy Jazz Fest. Dixon also directs the Indianapolis Chamber Orchestra Youth Jazz Ensemble. In recognition for his career, the Indianapolis Jazz Foundation inducted him into the Indianapolis Jazz Hall of Fame in 2015.

== Discography ==
| Year | Artist | Title | Label |
|---|---|---|---|
| 2006 | Rob Dixon & Trioloy +1 | What Things Could Be | Owl |
| 2007 | Cynthia Layne | Beautiful Soul | Owl |
| 2008 | Derrick Gardner and The Jazz Prophets | A Ride to the Other Side... | Owl |
| 2008 | The Dixon-Rhyne Project | Reinvention: The Dixon-Rhyne Project | Owl |
| 2008 | Buselli–Wallarab Jazz Orchestra | Where or When | Owl |
| 2009 | Derrick Gardner & The Jazz Prophets | Echoes of Ethnicity | Owl |
| 2009 | Mark Buselli | An Old Soul | Owl |
| 2010 | Buselli-Wallarab Jazz Orchestra | Mezzanine | Owl |
| 2010 | Mike Clark | Carnival of Soul | Owl |
| 2011 | The Headhunters | Platinum | Owl |
| 2013 | Tony Adamo (Vocal/Spoken Word) | Miles of Blu | UrbanZone |
| 2018 | Rob Dixon Trio | Coast to Crossroads | Rob Dixon |
