= Vincent Gardner =

American trombonist and composer (born 1972)

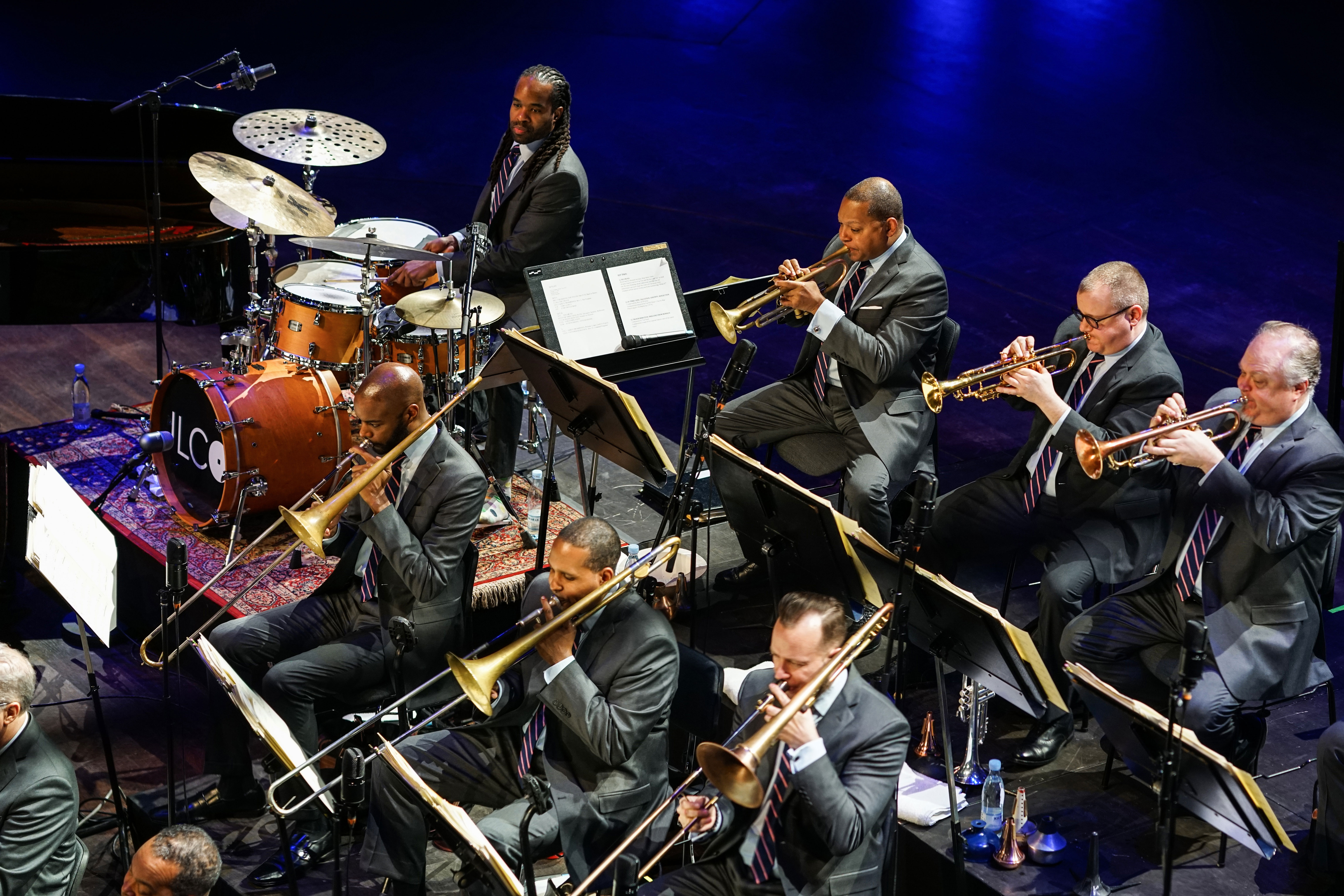
- Gardner with the Jazz at Lincoln Center Orchestra in Aalborg, 2020

Background information
- Born: October 31, 1972 (age 53)
- Genres: Jazz
- Occupations: Musician; composer
- Instrument: Trombone
- Years active: 1997–present
- Label: SteepleChase
- Member of: Jazz at Lincoln Center Orchestra

Vincent Gardner (born October 31, 1972) is an American jazz trombonist and composer.

Gardner has released six albums on SteepleChase Records and also performs and records in a group with his brother, trumpeter Derrick Gardner.

He is the lead trombonist for the Jazz at Lincoln Center Orchestra, a member of the band since 2000.

== Discography ==
=== As leader ===
- 2005: Elbow Room (SteepleChase)
- 2006: The Good Book, Ch. 1 (SteepleChase)
- 2007: The Good Book, Ch. 2 (SteepleChase)
- 2008: Vin-Slidin' (SteepleChase)
- 2009: Three-Five (SteepleChase)
- 2012: The Good Book, Ch. 3 (SteepleChase)

=== As sideman ===
- 1997: Blues for the New Millennium, Marcus Roberts (Columbia)
- 1998: New York in the Fifties, Steve Allee (Alley Oop)
- 1998: Priority Soul, Brad Leali (Jazzworld.com)
- 2000: Dear Louis, Nicholas Payton (Verve)
- 2001: All Rise, Wynton Marsalis (Sony Classical)
- 2002: Reel Time, Wynton Marsalis (Sony Classical)
- 2003: Salt, Lizz Wright (Verve)
- 2003: Slim Goodie, Derrick Gardner and the Jazz Prophets (Impact Music)
- 2003: We Do it Different, Frank Foster's Loud Minority Big Band (Mapleshade)
- 2004: A Love Supreme, Jazz at Lincoln Center Orchestra (Palmetto)
- 2005: Don't Be Afraid: The Music of Charles Mingus, Jazz at Lincoln Center Orchestra (Palmetto)
- 2005: Jam Session Vol. 20, Vincent Gardner, Andre Hayward, and Danny Kirkhum (SteepleChase)
- 2006: Jam Session Vol. 23, Vincent Gardner, Wycliffe Gordon, and Conrad Herwig (SteepleChase)
- 2008: A Ride to the Other Side, Derrick Gardner and the Jazz Prophets (Owl Studios)
- 2009: Echoes of Ethnicity, Derrick Gardner and the Jazz Prophets + 2 (Owl Studios)

== See also ==
- Jazz at Lincoln Center Orchestra
- Derrick Gardner
