= Dave Stryker =

American jazz guitarist (born 1957)

- Born: David Michael Stryker; March 30, 1957 (age 68); Omaha, Nebraska, U.S.
- Genres: Jazz
- Occupation: Musician
- Instrument: Guitar
- Years active: 1988–present
- Labels: SteepleChase; Strikezone Records
- Website: www.davestryker.com

Dave Stryker (born March 30, 1957) is an American jazz guitarist. He has recorded more than 35 albums as a leader and has been a featured sideman with Stanley Turrentine, Jack McDuff, and Kevin Mahogany.

== Career ==
Stryker grew up in Omaha, Nebraska. When he was 10 years old, he was inspired by The Beatles to start playing guitar. His interest was rock and roll until he heard the albums My Favorite Things by John Coltrane and Beyond the Blue Horizon by George Benson. By 17, he was a jazz guitarist in Omaha. In 1978, he moved to Los Angeles, where he took lessons from another Omaha native, Billy Rogers, and met organist Jack McDuff. After moving to New York City, he toured with McDuff in 1984–1985, then spent ten years with saxophonist Stanley Turrentine.

Stryker formed a band with saxophonist Steve Slagle and a trio with organist Jared Gold and drummer Tony Reedus (later McClenty Hunter and Billy Hart). He worked with Kevin Mahogany as sideman, composer, and arranger, appeared with him at Carnegie Hall, and toured with him in Europe and Japan. He has also worked with Eliane Elias, Javon Jackson, and Andy LaVerne.

He has taught jazz guitar at Indiana University and Montclair State University and at the Jamey Aebersold Summer Jazz Workshop, the Litchfield Jazz Camp, and the Veneto/New School Workshop in Italy.

In 2018, Stryker began teaching jazz guitar online through the ArtistWorks music education website.

Stryker is the a member of the jazz faculty at William Paterson University, Rutgers University, and Montclair State University.

== Awards and honors ==
- Top Ten Guitarists, DownBeat magazine Readers and Critics' Poll, 2001–2025
- Rising Star, DownBeat magazine Critics' Poll
- Hot House magazine Jazz Award – Best Guitar Fans' Decision 2017

== Discography ==
=== As leader/co-leader ===
Year recorded	Title	Label	Personnel/Notes
1988	First Strike	Someday of Mugen Music	With Steve Slagle (soprano sax, alto sax) Marc Cohen (piano), Ron McClure (bass), Billy Hart (drums)
1990	Strike Zone	SteepleChase	With Steve Slagle (soprano sax, alto sax, alto clarinet) Marc Cohen (piano), Ron McClure (bass), Ronnie Burrage (drums)
1991	Passage	SteepleChase	With Steve Slagle (soprano sax, alto sax, alto clarinet), Joey Calderazzo (piano), Jay Anderson (bass), Adam Nussbaum (drums)
1991	Guitar On Top	Ken Music	With Mulgrew Miller (piano), Robert Hurst (bass), Victor Lewis (drums)
1992	Blue Degrees	SteepleChase	With Rick Margitza (tenor sax), Larry Goldings (organ), Jeff Hirshfield (drums)
1993	Full Moon	SteepleChase	With Steve Slagle (soprano sax, flute), Jay Anderson (bass), Jeff Hirshfield (drums)
1994	Dave Stryker With The Bill Warfield Big Band	SteepleChase	With Bill Warfield Big Band
1994	Stardust	SteepleChase	With Joey DeFrancesco (organ), Adam Nussbaum (drums)
1995	The Greeting	SteepleChase	With Bruce Barth (piano), Scott Colley (bass), Tony Reedus (drums)
1996	Blue To The Bone	SteepleChase	With Brian Lynch (trumpet), Rich Perry (tenor sax), Bob Parsons (baritone sax), Conrad Herwig (trombone), Bruce Barth (piano, organ), Jay Anderson (bass), Billy Drummond (drums)
1996	Big Room	SteepleChase	With Rich Perry (tenor sax), Ed Howard (bass), Billy Hart (drums)
1996	Six String Santa	Strikezone Records	Solo Guitar
1997	All The Way	SteepleChase	With Scott Colley (bass), Bill Stewart (drums)
1998	Blue To The Bone II	SteepleChase	With Brian Lynch (trumpet), Steve Slagle (alto sax, flute), Bob Parsons (baritone sax), Clack Gayton (trombone, bass trombone) Bruce Barth (piano, organ), Jay Anderson (bass), Adam Nussbaum (drums)
1998	Shades Of Miles	SteepleChase	With Brian Lynch (trumpet), Steve Slagle (soprano sax, alto sax), Billy Drewes (soprano sax, tenor sax, bass clarinet), Larry Goldings (electric piano, organ), Marc Copland (electric piano) Terry Burns (bass), Billy Hart (drums), Manolo Badrena (percussion)
1999	Changing Times	SteepleChase	With Steve Slagle (soprano sax, alto sax), Bill Moring (bass), Tim Horner (drums), Manolo Badrena (percussion)
2001	Blue To The Bone III	SteepleChase	With Brian Lynch(trumpet) Steve Slagle (alto sax), Bob Parsons (baritone sax), Clack Gayton (trombone, bass trombone) James Williams (piano, organ), Jay Anderson (bass), Tim Horner (drums)
2001	Shades Beyond	SteepleChase	With Steve Slagle (soprano sax, alto sax, alto clarinet), David Berkman (electric piano, organ), Terry Burns (bass), Lenny White (drums)
2003	Strike Up The Band	SteepleChase	With Xavier Davis (piano), Andy McKee (bass), Billy Hart (drums)
2004	Big City	Mel Bay	With David Kikoski (piano), Ed Howard (bass), Victor Lewis (drums)
2005	The Chaser	Mel Bay	With Jared Gold (organ), Tony Reedus (drums)
2008	One For Reedus	SteepleChase	With Jared Gold (organ), Steve Williams (drums)
2009	Keystone	SteepleChase	With Stephen Riley (tenor sax), Jared Gold (organ), Quincy Davis (drums)
2010	Blue Strike	SteepleChase	With Freddie Hendrix (trumpet), Stephen Riley (tenor sax), Jared Gold (organ), Billy Hart (drums)
2011	Blue To The Bone IV	SteepleChase	With Freddie Hendrix (trumpet), Steve Slagle (alto sax), Gary Smulyan (baritone sax) Jared Gold (organ), McClenty Hunter (drums)
2013	Eight Track	Strikezone Records	With Stefon Harris (vibraphone), Jared Gold (organ), McClenty Hunter (drums)
2014	Messin With Mister T	Strikezone Records	With Houston Person, Mike Lee, Don Braden, Jimmy Heath, Chris Potter, Bob Mintzer, Eric Alexander Javon Jackson, Steve Slagle, Tivon Pennicott (tenor sax), Jared Gold (organ), McClenty Hunter (drums), Mayra Casales (percussion)
2016	Eight Track II	Strikezone Records	With Stefon Harris (vibraphone), Jared Gold (organ), McClenty Hunter (drums)
2017	Strikin' Ahead	Strikezone Records	With Stefon Harris (vibraphone), Jared Gold (organ), McClenty Hunter (drums)
2019	Eight Track III	Strikezone Records	With Stefon Harris (vibraphone), Jared Gold (organ), McClenty Hunter (drums), Mayra Casales (percussion)
2019	Eight Track Christmas	Strikezone Records	With Stefon Harris (vibraphone), Jared Gold (organ), McClenty Hunter (drums, percussion)
2020	Blue Soul	Strikezone Records	With Bob Mintzer & The WDR Big Band
2021	Baker's Circle	Strikezone Records	With Walter Smith III (tenor sax), Jared Gold (organ), McClenty Hunter (drums), Mayra Casales (percussion)
2022	As We Are	Strikezone Records	With Julian Shore (piano, arranger), John Patitucci (bass), Brian Blade (drums), plus String Quartet
2023	Prime	Strikezone Records	With Jared Gold (organ), McClenty Hunter (drums)
2024	Groove Street	Strikezone Records	With Bob Mintzer (tenor sax), Jared Gold (organ), McClenty Hunter (drums)
2025	Stryker with Strings Goes to the Movies	Strikezone Records	With Brent Wallarab (arranger, conductor), Sarah Caswell (violin soloist, concert master), Xavier Davis (piano, electric piano), Jeremy Allen (bass, electric bass), McClenty Hunter (drums), 17 Piece String Section
2025	Blue Fire: The Van Gelder Session	Strikezone Records	With Jared Gold (organ), McClenty Hunter (drums)

The Stryker/Slagle Band
With Steve Slagle

- The Stryker/Slagle Band (Khaeon, 2003)
- Live at the Jazz Standard (Zoho, 2005)
- Latest Outlook (Zoho, 2007)
- The Scene (Zoho, 2008)
- Keeper (Panorama, 2010)
- Routes (Strikezone, 2016)

With Trio Mundo

- Carnaval (Khaeon, 2002)
- Trio Mundo Rides Again (Zoho, 2004)

With Others

- Exit 13 (Etoile, 2002) with Sylvia Cuenca, Kyle Koehler
- Suit Up! (Bounce-Step, 2013) with Matt Kane, Kyle Koehler

=== As sideman ===
With Allan Botschinsky

- Last Summer (MA Music, 1992)
- I've Got Another Rhythm (MA Music, 1995)

With Jared Gold

- Out of Line (Posi-Tone, 2010)
- Intuition (Posi-Tone, 2012)
- JG3+3 (Posi-Tone, 2014)
- Metropolitan Rhythm (Posi-Tone, 2015)
- Reemergence (Strikezone, 2018)

With Kevin Mahogany

- Another Time Another Place (Warner Bros., 1997)
- Pride & Joy (Telarc, 2002)
- Next Time You See Me (Mahogany Jazz, 2012)

With Jorge Nila

- The Way I Feel (Strikezone, 2003)
- Tenor Time (Ninjazz, 2018)

With Steve Slagle

- Smoke Signals (Panorama, 1991)
- Our Sound! (Double-Time, 1995)
- Steve Slagle Plays Monk (SteepleChase, 1998)
- New New York (OmniTone, 2000)
- Evensong (Panorama, 2013)
- Dedication (Panorama, 2018)

With Matthew Whitaker

- Outta the Box (Jazz Foundation of America, 2017)
- Now Hear This (Resilience Music Alliance, 2019)

With others

- Steve Allee Big Band, Naptown Sound (Jazzville Records, 2025)
- Don Braden, Luminosity (Creative Perspective Music, 2015)
- Kendall "Keyz" Carter, Introducing Kendall Carter (Lladnek Music, 2021)
- Rondi Charleston, Resilience (Resilience Music Alliance, 2017)
- Royce Campbell, Six by Six (Paddle Wheel/King [jp], 1994)
- Mike Freeman & Spellbound, Street Shuffle (Best Recordings, 1991)
- Giacomo Gates, Miles Tones: Giacomo Gates Sings the Music of Miles Davis (Savant, 2013)
- Craig Handy, Reflections in Change (Sirocco Music, 1999)
- Javon Jackson, Pleasant Valley (Blue Note, 1999)
- Matthew Kaminski, Swingin' On the New Hammond (Chicken Coup, 2013)
- Andy LaVerne, Stan Getz in Chappaqua (SteepleChase, 1997)
- Pete Levin, Jump! (Pete Levin Music, 2010)
- Tony Reedus, Minor Thang (Criss Cross, 1996)
- Larry Schneider, Ali Girl (SteepleChase, 1997)
- Stanley Turrentine, T Time (MusicMasters, 1995)
- Charenee Wade, Offering (Membran, 2015)
