= The Joint is Jumpin' =

The Joint is Jumpin' may refer to:

== Music ==
- "The Joint is Jumpin'", a 1937 song by Fats Waller, co-credited with Andy Razaf and J. C. Johnson
- The Joint is Jumpin', a 1981 album by Eight to the Bar
- The Joint is Jumpin', a 1998 album by Jake Hanna
- The Joint is Jumpin', a 1997 album by Ray Kamalay and his Red Hot Peppers
- The Joint is Jumpin', a 1987 album by Stan Mark and his River City StomperZ
- The Joint is Jumpin': the Music of Fats Waller, a 2003 album by Ralph Sutton
- "The Joint is Jumpin'", a song on the 2016 album The Boop-A-Doo by Cherry Poppin' Daddies
- "The Joint is Jumpin'", a song on the 1987 album Ain't Misbehavin' by Clark Terry
- "The Joint is Jumpin'", a song on the 2012 album Dee Does Broadway by Dee Snider
- "The Joint is Jumpin'", a song on the 1985 album They Said It Couldn't Be Done by Grandmaster Flash
- "The Joint is Jumpin'", a song on the 1979 album Ain't Misbehavin' by Hank Jones
- "The Joint is Jumpin'", a song on the 2006 album All Rise: A Joyful Elegy for Fats Waller by Jason Moran
- "The Joint is Jumpin'", a song on the 2001 album Downtown Blues by Steve Allee

== Other uses ==
- The Joint is Jumpin' (film), 1949
