= Bill Moring =

- Born: 1958; Fort Wayne, Indiana, U.S.
- Genres: Jazz
- Occupation: Musician
- Instrument: Piano
- Years active: 1980–present
- Labels: Owl
- Website: www.billmoring.com

Bill Moring is an American jazz bassist.

== Career ==
Bill Moring was born in 1958 in Fort Wayne, Indiana. After attending Indiana State University for a year, he toured with jazz groups in Indianapolis and Cincinnati and worked with Claude Sifferlen and Steve Allee. In 1980, he began playing with John Von Ohlen's big band and recorded a live album with the band that was nominated for a Grammy Award.

In 1984 he moved to New York City, where he developed a partnership with drummer Mel Lewis. During the next few years he toured with Woody Herman's Thundering Herd and the Count Basie Orchestra. With a grant from the National Endowment for the Arts (NEA), he studied with jazz bassist Rufus Reid.

He recorded for the jazz label Owl Studios in Indianapolis, releasing the album Spaces in Time in 2008 under the name Bill Moring & Way Out East with a quintet of Tim Armacost, Steve Allee, Steve Johns, and Jack Walrath. He played double bass in Allee's trio and on the group's albums Colors and Dragonfly, both released by Owl Studios.

Moring has played and recorded with singers Joe Williams, Mel Tormé, Dakota Staton, Maxine Sullivan, and Susannah McCorkle, instrumentalists Frank Foster, Al Cohn, Clark Terry, Mickey Roker, Tommy Flanagan, Junior Cook, Roland Hanna, Vernel Fournier, Mel Lewis, and Ray Barretto and contemporary musicians John Abercrombie, Gary Bartz, Larry Coryell, Dave Kikoski, Billy Hart, Eddie Henderson, Joe Locke, Mulgrew Miller, Chris Potter, Dave Stryker, and James Williams.

He is the faculty at Montclair State University and has taught at Rutgers University, New Jersey City University, Long Island University, and State University of New York at Purchase.
