= The Dixon-Rhyne Project =

American jazz band

- Origin: Indianapolis, Indiana, U.S.
- Genres: Jazz, jazz fusion, jazz-funk
- Years active: 2008–present
- Label: Owl
- Members: Rob Dixon; Melvin Rhyne; Fareed Haque; Kenny Phelps

The Dixon-Rhyne Project is an American jazz group from Indianapolis, Indiana.

The Dixon-Rhyne Project was formed in 2007 when tenor saxophonist Rob Dixon approached organist Melvin Rhyne, of Wes Montgomery Trio fame, about forming a boundary-pushing jazz jam band. Dixon and Rhyne then hired drummer Kenny Phelps and Chicago guitarist Fareed Haque. In 2008 Owl Studios released the debut album Reinvention: The Dixon-Rhyne Project.
