= David Keith =

David Keith may refer to:

- David Keith (novelist) (1906–1994), pen name of American scholar Francis Steegmuller
- David Keith (actor) (born 1954), American film and TV performer and director
- David Keith (physicist), Canadian-born Professor of Public Policy active since 1980s
- David Keith (racing driver) (1973–2020), American NASCAR driver between 2000 and 2004
- David Keith (drummer) (born 1973), American drummer, composer and producer
- David A. Keith, Australian botanist, ecologist and academic active since 1990s

== See also ==
- Keith David (born 1956), American actor and producer
