= Beautiful Soul (Cynthia Layne album) =

Studio album by Cynthia Layne
- Released: 25 September 2007
- Genre: Pop rock
- Length: 1:09:38
- Label: Owl
- Producer: Rob Dixon; Gary Mielke

Cynthia Layne chronology
Reality (2004)	Beautiful Soul (2007)

Professional ratings
Review scores
Source	Rating
AllMusic	4/5 stars

Beautiful Soul is the third and final studio album by Cynthia Layne. The album was recorded and released in 2007, after Layne had taken a three-year hiatus from her career as a solo artist. Beautiful Soul was the last studio solo album released during Layne's lifetime.

== Track listing ==
1. "Be You" - 3:43
2. "Kings & Queens" - 4:47
3. "Letting You Go" - 3:42
4. "Pimp Talk" - 4:41
5. "I Can't Change You" - 4:05
6. "Will U Be There" - 7:05
7. "All I Need" - 3:39
8. "Beautiful Soul" - 4:54
9. "Free Yourself" - 5:13
10. "Funny" - 6:01
11. "Mystery" - 5:42
12. "We" - 5:01
13. "Two and One" - 4:52
14. "Letting You Go (Extended Play)" - 5:27
15. "Nina Shouts" - 0:47

== Personnel ==
Credits are adapted from the album's liner notes.

- Cynthia Layne - lead vocals, backing vocals
- Gary Mielke - bass guitar, keyboards, drum programming
- Kenny Phelps - drums, percussion
- Joe "Coo Coo Bird" Kelsey - acoustic and electric bass guitars
- Rob Dixon - keyboards, alto, soprano, and tenor saxophones
- Richard Dole - trombone
- P.J. Yinger - trombone
