= Starlite Campbell Band =

Portuguese musical group

Starlite & Campbell
- Origin: Isle of Man
- Genres: Rock, Art Rock, Blues, Folk
- Years active: 2016–present
- Label: Supertone Records (London)
- Members: Suzy Starlite; Simon Campbell
- Website: starlite-campbell.com

Starlite & Campbell is a group based in Portugal. Formed in 2016, the band is led by married couple Suzy Starlite and Simon Campbell. Their debut album, Blueberry Pie, was nominated for a European Blues Award in November 2017 and blends British blues, British rock, blues and British folk.

In 2023, following the transition album The Language of Curiosity, they decided to change musical direction and launched the multimedia, art rock project Starlite.One. Simultaneously, the band name was changed from the Starlite Campbell Band to Starlite & Campbell reflecting the new direction.

== History ==
The duo had been recording, playing and touring independently in bands for many years until they met in 2012, when Starlite asked Campbell, who was British Blues Awards Nominee, to join her band as the guitar player. The two were wed in 2014, forming their new joint band, Starlite Campbell, in January 2016.

As singer-songwriters, they started writing together and built up a collection of songs in styles including Americana, folk music, electronic music, progressive rock and British blues. The duo primarily release their work on their independent label Supertone Records.

Their first recorded collaboration was on Campbell's second solo album, The Knife where they jointly wrote and performed Do You Want Me with Campbell on acoustic guitar, Theremin and vocals and Starlite on Mellotron and vocals.

Starlite is a regular contributor to Bass Musician and after several moves within Europe, they live in the Supertone Sonic Laboratory which is located in Foz do Arelho, Portugal.

== Recordings ==
=== Blueberry Pie ===
The couple wrote the material for their debut album Blueberry Pie over two weeks in April 2016 and started recording in July at the Supertone Records Studio in Valencia, Spain, with the album mixed and mastered in October 2016. It was produced and engineered by Campbell, co-produced by Starlite and mastered by Jon Astley who is known for his work with The Who and other rock luminaries. In addition to the band and session musicians Steve Gibson and Jonny Henderson, Valencian native Danny Boy Sanchez was co opted to play harmonica on track No. 5, "Say What You Want".

The album artwork is based on a picture taken by Starlite in the late 70's of her Grandmother Betty Higgs.

Blueberry Pie was released on 1 February 2017.

The band made a festive release It Started Raining on 24 December 2017. The song was recorded live at Supertone Records studio in Valencia, Spain as part of the 'Blueberry Pie' sessions with a single guitar overdub. The cover image was taken by Isle of Man-based photographer Phil Kneen and features an old caravan featured in the song's lyric.

On 12 November 2018, the band simultaneously released their new single Heart of Stone along with a limited edition, gatefold, 180g double phonograph record (vinyl) of their album Blueberry Pie. The lacquers were cut by Miles Showell at Abbey Road Studios and the pressing supported by the Isle of Man Arts Council. Recorded as part of the original Blueberry Pie sessions, the track appears exclusively in physical form on side four of the record. The cover image was taken by Isle of Man-based photographer Phil Kneen featuring actor Rob Smith.

=== The Language of Curiosity ===
In May 2019, Starlite and Campbell relocated their Supertone Records studio into the countryside near Hanover, Germany, where they started recording their second British blues / British rock music album, The Language of Curiosity moving again in October 2020 to Lisbon, Portugal where they continue work on the recordings. Five singles have been released from the album which was made its debut on November 5, 2021 and has been extensively reviewed by publications in the UK, Europe, USA and Australia including Blues Matters!, R2 (Rock'n'Reel), and Classic Rock.

It is produced and engineered by Campbell, co-produced by Starlite and mastered by Astley. In addition to the band, session musicians Steve Gibson (drums), Gabriele De Vecchio (Grand / upright Piano, Wurlitzer and Hammond organ) and Jonny Henderson (Hammond Organ, Wurlitzer Electric piano, Vox Continental, Hohner Clavinet and Bechstein grand piano) were also featured. Some of Henderson's keyboard parts were recorded at Rockfield Studios in Monmouth, Wales.

The cover photograph was taken by photographer Stuart Bebb depicting dancing in the streets of Oxford following the relaxation of the COVID-19 restrictions in the United Kingdom.

=== Starlite Campbell Band Live! ===
During the course of the band's career, several live recordings were made, and in 2022, eight tracks were mixed and released digitally and on Compact Disc. The album features improvised and extended versions of tracks from Campbell's solo album ThirtySix plus the bands Language of Curiosity, Blueberry Pie and Procol Harum's A Whiter Shade Of Pale, which was released as a single in June 2022. The album has attracted excellent reviews.

The band digitally released the accompanying album Starlite Campbell Band Live! 2 in October 2022.

=== Starlite.One album ===
In July 2023, the couple completed recording an art rock album Starlite.One, which fuses electronic elements with traditional instrumentation. Apart from drums and some percussion, they played all instruments and recorded in their studio based in Samora Correia, Portugal. It was produced and engineered by Campbell, co-produced by Starlite and mastered by Astley. Starlite created the collage artwork on the front and centre gatefold cover with graphic design by Tiago Cruz.

The album was released on CD, vinyl and digitally on September 1, 2023 with the first single, Saving Me, released on July 7, 2023. The second single, The Voting Machine was released on November 2, 2023. Both videos were directed and edited by Starlite.

The album has received a number of positive reviews, achieving five stars in Music News and listed #23 in their top 28 albums of 2023.

== Live performances ==
=== Trio/quartet ===
During 2017 and 2018, the band performed throughout Spain and the Isle of Man; in July 2018 the band played at Linton Festival.

Accompanied by drummer Steve Gibson, the band traveled to Australia to headline the blues marquee at Wangaratta Festival of Jazz on Saturday 3 November 2018 to over 3,000 people. Accompanying the band on this show was Australian keyboard player Clayton Doley.

The Starlite Campbell Band went on their debut tour of the United Kingdom in December 2018 with performances in Coulsdon, Pershore, Edinburgh, Eaglescliffe, Saltburn-by-the-Sea and The Met in Campbell's hometown of Bury, Greater Manchester.

They toured Europe in 2019, which included a show at The Half Moon, Putney in London, plus the Forum, Darlington, The Met, Bury, Greater Manchester—which featured Josh Phillips of Procol Harum on keyboards—Flirting With The Blues festival, Amersfoort, Porgy en Bess, Terneuzen and the Greystones, Sheffield.

In 2020, the band performed at The Great British Rock and Blues Festival (main stage), Skegness; Backstage at the Green, Kinross; Redcar R&B Club and the Half Moon, Putney amongst others. Due to the COVID-19 pandemic, much of 2021 was rescheduled to 2022 and 2023.

The band undertook a two week UK tour as a trio in September and October 2023 with new drummer Hugo Danin, documenting the experience through a tour diary on their blog.

=== Duo ===
Starlite & Campbell tour material from the band's first three studio albums plus Campbell's ThirtySix and The Knife were sold in venues throughout the UK and Europe.

Between December 2021 and July 2022, Starlite & Campbell broadcast a weekly live stream on YouTube, Twitter, Twitch and Facebook from the Supertone studio in Portugal.

== Members ==
- Suzy Starlite: Lead and backing vocals, bass guitar, piano, mellotron, stylophone, Mandolin, Fife (instrument), Sequential Prophet-5, Waldorf STVC, percussion, Moog Taurus bass pedals, Philicorda and recorder (2016–present)
- Simon Campbell: Lead and backing vocals, electric guitar, resonator guitar, Moog guitar, acoustic guitar, theremin, Sequential Tempest drum machine, Moog Matriarch and Minitaur, percussion and piano (2016–present)

== Session musicians ==
- Josh Phillips: Hammond organ, Wurlitzer electric piano (2019-2020)
- Govert Van Der Kolm: Hammond organ, Wurlitzer electric piano (2019)
- Jonny Henderson: Hammond organ, Wurlitzer electric piano, Piano (2016–2021)
- Clayton Doley: Hammond organ, Wurlitzer electric piano (2018)
- Christian Madden: Hammond organ, Wurlitzer electric piano (2016–present)
- Gabriele Del Vecchio: Hammond organ, Wurlitzer electric piano, Piano (2017–2022)
- Steve Gibson: Drum kit (2016–present)
- Hugo Danin: Drum kit (2023–present)
- Dave Boyd: Bodhrán, Wurlitzer electric piano, Piano, synthesizers, programming (2025)

== Equipment ==
Both Starlite and Campbell are users of vintage equipment, specifically valve amplifiers for guitar and bass and use multiple brands including vintage Hiwatt, Gartone, Germino, Vox, Matamp, Supertone, Ampeg and Van Weelden with speakers by Electro-Voice, Celestion, Supertone, Weber and Bergantino Audio Systems.

Starlite uses instruments by Mike Lull, Gretsch, Fender Musical Instruments Corporation and Fylde Guitars, some fitted with the Hipshot drop-D tuners. She was featured with a two-page article in Bass Guitar magazine talking about her equipment and playing style.

In June 2022, Starlite was also featured in the Wonder Women feature in No Treble magazine followed by an interview in September 2023.

Campbell's instruments include Gibson, Moog Synthesizer, Moog Guitar E1-M, Mosrite, Fender Musical Instruments Corporation, Collings Guitars, National Reso-Phonic Guitars, Guild Guitar Company, Duesenberg Guitars, Fylde Guitars Fallstaff six, 12 and Classical models all with cutaways, plus signature models by luthier Jim Drake in Colorado, Springer Guitars and Gordon Whittam (Gordy) in Manchester, UK with pickups by Lollar, Sheptone, Lindy Fralin and House of Tone. He is known for his extensive use of the Maestro Echoplex EP2 tape echo.

They use bass/guitar strings principally by Curt Mangan, Thomastik-Infeld and Pyramid with Effects unit's by Lehle, DWJ Pedals, Supertone, Ernie Ball, Hudson Electronics, TC Electronic, Eventide, Echo Fix, Lexicon, Chase Tone, Headway, Sonic Research, LovePedal, Meris, OTO Machines, Skrydstrup R&D, Textone, Digitech, Voodoo Labs, GigRig, Origin Effects, CMAT Mods, Headway Music Audio, Gamechanger Audio, Strymon, B. K. Butler, Stomp Under Foot, Danelectro, T-Rex, Pro Co RAT, Ceriatone and Fulltone.

Synthesisers: Matriarch, Minitaur and Opus 3 by Moog synthesizer, STVC by Waldorf Music, Tempest and Prophet-5 by Sequential.

== Side projects ==
=== Vibrationists ===
Starlite (bass guitar, Fife (instrument), piano, vocals) and Campbell (guitar, synthesiser, drum machine, vocals) along with a selection of collaborators commenced rehearsals in February 2025 for a new live music and multimedia project.

=== Starlite.One ===
In August 2022, Starlite & Campbell announced the development of a multimedia project, Starlite.One. The music binds conceptual, applied and visual art, which is represented physically and digitally.

=== VIBES ===
In January 2023, Starlite and Campbell launched their blog Vibes, where they write regular articles about life, culture, music technology and their art along with occasional podcasts.

=== The Supertone Show ===
From November 2015 to October 2019 and January 2023 to April 2024, Starlite and Campbell broadcast the Supertone Show, a weekly, music-inspired chat show about songs and the people who make them. It featured a mix of music from their vinyl collections, plus special shows focusing on inspirational people who have influenced and changed the sound of modern music. The show was syndicated to 14 internet and FM stations based in the Netherlands, USA, Canada, and the UK. Repeats are still being broadcast and an archive is available on a section of their blog VIBES.

=== Electrolite ===
In May 2014 the couple, with Mark Cleator, recorded a synth-pop / electronic music, extended play record under the name Electrolite. Writing took place on the Isle of Man and later in Duras, Lot-et-Garonne, France and Valencia, Spain. The EP was released electronically and on 180g vinyl and features Starlite on vocals, Campbell on drum & bass synthesiser programming, MOOG E1 guitar, electric guitar, Theremin, backing vocals with Mark Cleator on an array of analog synthesizers by Moog, ARP, Dave Smith plus an original Mellotron. It was recorded at the Chairworks Studio in Castleford with engineer James Mottershead, produced by Campbell and mastered by Kevin Grainger at Wired Masters, London and in 2017 the record was licensed to Ninthwave Records. The sleeve was designed by Barry Kinder and Daren Newman.

== Discography ==
Studio albums

Year	Album	Label	IBBA Chart peak position
2017	Blueberry Pie	Supertone Records	6
2021	The Language of Curiosity	Supertone Records	2
2023	Starlite.One	Supertone Records	

Live albums

Year	Album	Label
2022	Starlite Campbell Band Live!	Supertone Records
2022	Starlite Campbell Band Live! 2	Supertone Records

Singles

Year	Single	Label
2013	Happiness In Halos	Supertone Records
2017	It Started Raining	Supertone Records
2018	Heart of Stone	Supertone Records
2020	Stone Cold Crazy	Supertone Records
2020	Lay It Out On Me	Supertone Records
2020	Can't Find My Way Home	Supertone Records
2021	Gaslight	Supertone Records
2021	Take Time To Grow Old	Supertone Records
2022	Language Of Curiosity	Supertone Records
2022	A Whiter Shade Of Pale	Supertone Records
2023	Our Lips Are Sealed	Supertone Records
2023	If You Could Read My Mind	Supertone Records
2023	Saving Me	Supertone Records
2023	The Voting Machine	Supertone Records
2025	Song to the Siren	Supertone Records
2025	Everything	Supertone Records
2025	Ramblin' on My Mind	Supertone Records

== Awards and nominations ==
Year	Association	Category	Nominated work	Result
2017	European Blues Awards	Best Album / Recorded Session	Blueberry Pie	Nominated
2022	Graham Steel Music Company	Best Original Band	The Language of Curiosity	Won
