= Downtown Blues =

Studio album by Steve Allee
- Released: 2001
- Recorded: 2001
- Genre: Jazz
- Length: 69:00
- Label: Owl Studios
- Producer: Steve Allee, Tom Griswold

Steve Allee chronology
The Magic Hour (1995)	Downtown Blues (2001)	New York in the Fifties (2001)

The Grammy-nominated Downtown Blues is Steve Allee's second album. It contains music from the John Von Ohlen, Chuck Carter and Steve Allee Big Bands.

== Players ==
- Piano: Steve Allee
- Organ: Steve Corn
- Guitar: Royce Campbell
- Bass: John Clayton and Bill Moring
- Drums: John Von Ohlen
- Vibes: Art Reiner or Claude Sifferlin
- Timbales: Art Reiner
- Congas: Michael McFarland
- Voice: Rita Reed, Chuck Carter
- Reeds: Tom Meyer, Mark Radway, Harry Miedema, Chuck Carter, Terry Cook
- Trumpet: Larry Wiseman, David Herndon, Jim Edison, Rick Savage, Steve Robinett, Don Johnson, Larry McWilliams, Al Kiger, Al Hembd
- Trombone: Flip Miller, Bruce Geske, Tim Riggins, Jared Rodin, Ed Cox, David Pavolka, Ken Kugler
- Recording engineer: Jack Gilfoy, Mark Hood, John Lazott
- Mastering: Alan Johnson, TRC Studios

== Tracks ==
1. Showtime
2. A Walk Through Bombay
3. Downtown Blues
4. Friday's Waltz
5. Big George
6. It Could Happen to You
7. Cariba
8. Saturn's Dance
9. The Joint Is Jumpin'
10. Algeria
11. Burma
12. Danse of Siam
