= Matthew Kaminski =

Matthew Kaminski may refer to:

- Matthew Kaminski (journalist)
- Matthew Kaminski (musician)
