= Zarour =

Zarour or Zarou is a surname. Notable people with the surname include:

- Chaher Zarour (born 1983), French footballer
- Jeannette Zarou (born 1942), Palestinian-born Canadian soprano
- Richard Zarou (born 1981), American music composer
- Wanees Zarour (born 1986), American musician
- Younes Zarou (born 1998), German social media influencer
