= Blueberry Cave =

Studio album by Garaj Mahal
- Released: November 1, 2005
- Genre: Funk, Jamband, Jazz, Indian, Rock, Fusion, World Music
- Length: 71:09
- Label: Harmonized

Garaj Mahal chronology
Mondo Garaj (2003)	Blueberry Cave (2005)	w00t (2008)

Blueberry Cave is the fourth album and second studio album by United States–based fusion band Garaj Mahal.

== Reception ==
Blueberry Cave was well received and won the "Best Jam Album" award at the 6th Annual Independent Music Awards in 2007.

== Track listing ==
No.	Title	Writer(s)	Length
1.	"The Shadow"	Kai Eckhardt	9:15
2.	"Alvin"	Alan Hertz	5:08
3.	"Blueberry Cave"	Eric Levy	7:04
4.	"Spect Rap"	Eckhardt	2:20
5.	"No 'Spect"	Fareed Haque, Hertz	5:27
6.	"Massive"	Hertz	8:52
7.	"Cosmic Elevator"	Eckhardt	8:03
8.	"Paladin"	Levy	7:32
9.	"Bicycling in Bombay"	Garaj Mahal	6:13
10.	"Celtic Indian"	Hertz	11:15

== Personnel ==
- Fareed Haque – guitar
- Alan Hertz – drums
- Eric Levy – keyboards
- Kai Eckhardt – bass
