= Leo Rising (disambiguation) =

Leo Rising is a 2016 indie pop album by Karmin.

Leo Rising may also refer to:

- Leo Rising (Frank Foster album), a 1996 jazz album
- Leo Rising , a 2025 album by Canadian hard rock music ensemble Danko Jones
