= David Keith (drummer) =

American drummer

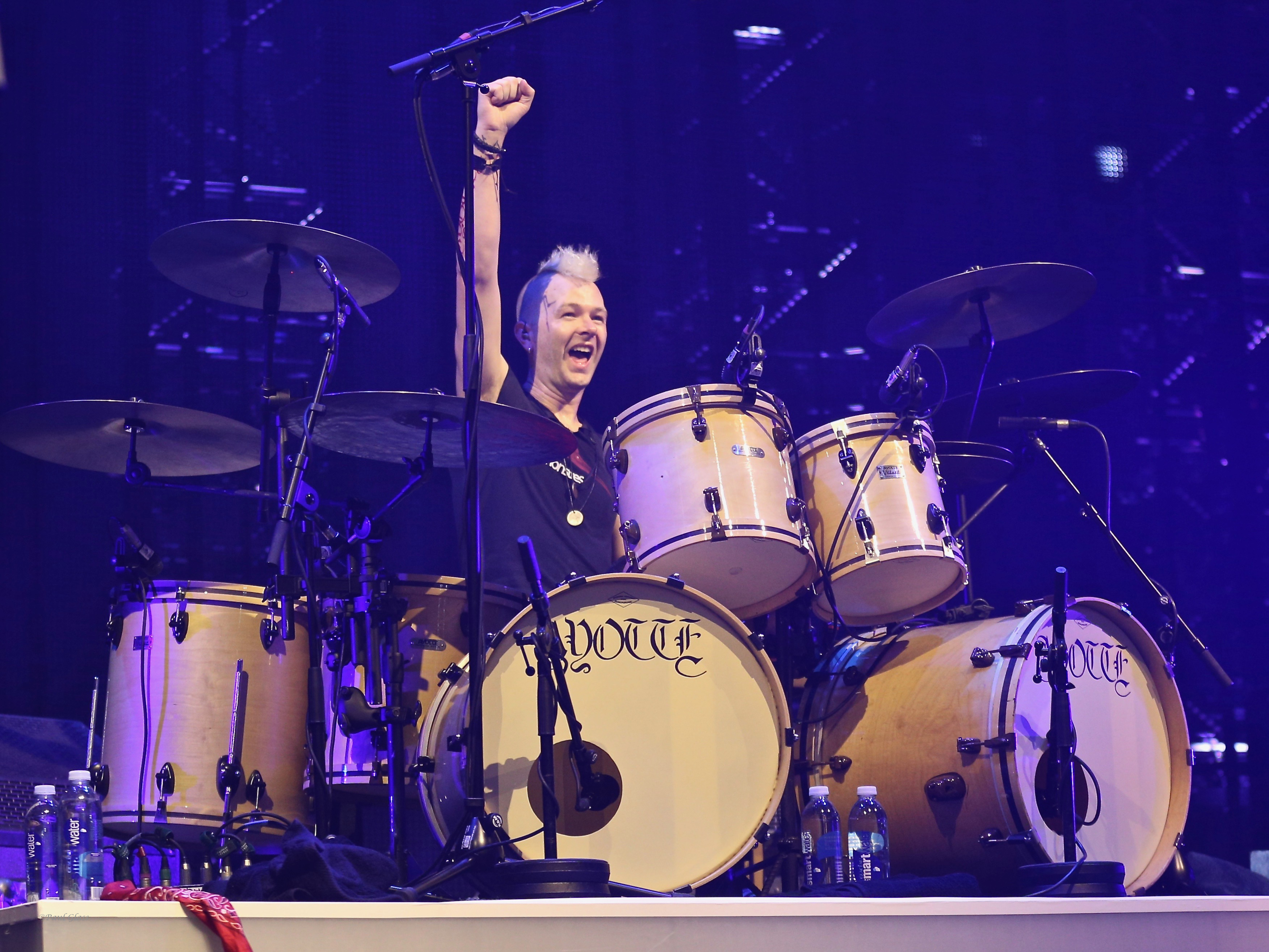
- Keith with Rainbow in 2017

Background information
- Born: October 18, 1973 (age 52); Hartford, Connecticut, U.S.
- Genres: Rock, pop, indie pop
- Occupation: Musician
- Instrument: Drums
- Years active: 1989–present
- Formerly of: Rainbow; Blackmore's Night; Leilani Kilgore; Nelson; Mission Zero
- Website: www.facebook.com/davidkeithdrummer

David Keith (born October 18, 1973) is an American drummer, composer, and producer living in Nashville, Tennessee. He plays and tours with Ritchie Blackmore in Blackmore's Night and Blackmore's Rainbow, Gunnar and Matthew Nelson in Nelson, and Ricky Nelson Remembered and Nashville phenom Leilani Kilgore.

== Biography ==
David Keith was born in Hartford, Connecticut. He began playing drums at age four and took private lessons from ages eight to eighteen. During his time playing with the William H. Hall High School Concert Jazz Band, David received an award and scholarship for outstanding musicianship from Berklee College of Music as part of its annual national high school jazz band competition.

In 1996, David moved to New Haven and joined the progressive rock band Mighty Purple, touring the US and releasing several albums. From 2000 through 2006, he played with Eight to the Bar, performing swing, R&B, and popular American music in the US and Europe, as well as recording several albums.

In 2010, David and his sister Megan Chenot formed the synth-pop band Mission Zero, releasing several albums and touring the US before disbanding in 2017. In 2012 he joined Blackmore’s Night, led by guitarist Ritchie Blackmore Ritchie Blackmore (founding member of Deep Purple and Ritchie Blackmore’s Rainbow). In 2015, Blackmore reformed Rainbow, selecting David Keith to play drums. The band has since released three live albums and two live DVDs, with a forthcoming live DVD of the band’s 2019 headlining performance at Sweden Rock to be released in late 2025.

In 2023 David joined Gunnar and Matthew Nelson as the drummer for their rock band Nelson, and for their tribute show to their father, Ricky Nelson. Also in 2023, David began playing with Nashville blues rock guitarist and frontwoman, Leilani Kilgore. The band released the studio EP The Devil You Know in 2024. Singles from the upcoming full-length album Tell Your Ghost were released spring and summer of 2025; the full album is slated for release October 2025.

David endorses Dream cymbals, Vater drumsticks, Aquarian drum heads, NoNuts cymbal sleeves, and SkyGel damper pads.

== Discography ==
=== Rainbow ===
- Rainbow: Memories in Rock II (2018)
- Rainbow: Memories in Rock, Live in Germany (2016)
- Live in Birmingham 2016 (2017)

=== Blackmore's Night ===
- Dancer and the Moon (2013)
- All Our Yesterdays (2015)

Mission Zero - Bruises on the Map (2011), Sky Candy (2013), People in Glass Yachts (2015), "Easy Tiger" (2017)

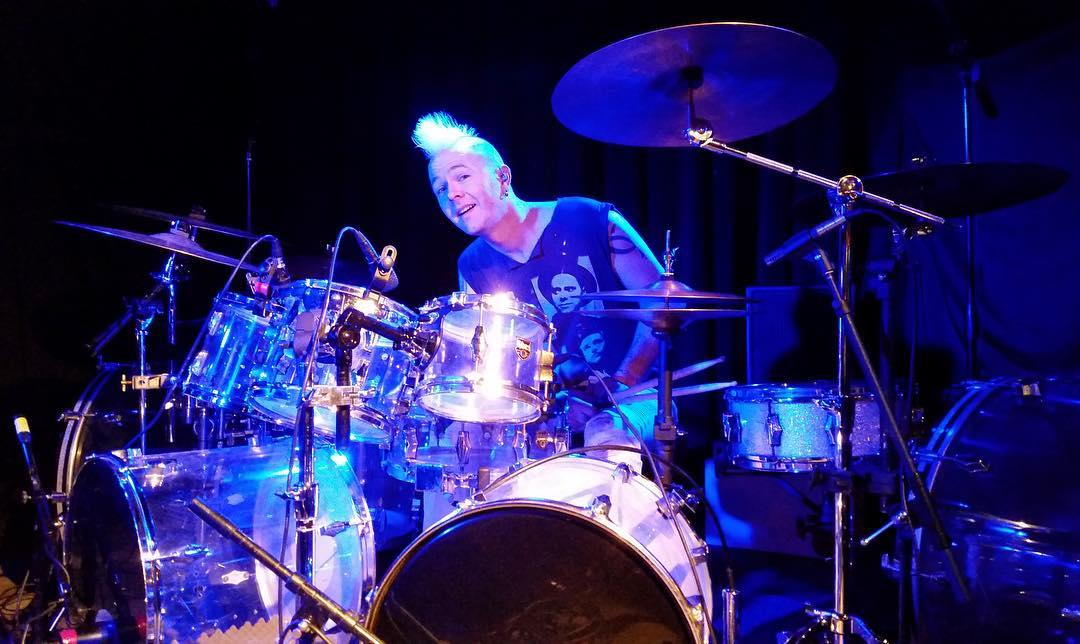
Keith at the Ballroom at the Outer Space, Hamden CT, during a video shoot to promote the Mission Zero release Easy Tiger, Feb. 2017.

Boyan & Boyer feat. Mission Zero - Dj SS & Influx UK presents: DEEPSOUND VOL.2 / Formation Records, "Be Right Here" (2015)

Eight to the Bar - Hey, Sailor! (2001), Superhero Swinger Undercover (2003), You Call This Swing? (2005)

Mighty Purple - Live - Eli Whitney Barn (1997), Para Mejor O Peor (1998), How to Make a Living (2000)

My Brightest Diamond - Tear It Down (2007)
