= Bass Guitar (magazine) =

British music magazine

- Editor: Joel McIver
- Categories: Music magazine (guitar focus)
- Frequency: Monthly
- Publisher: Future plc
- First issue: June 2003
- Company: Future plc
- Country: United Kingdom
- Based in: Bath, Somerset, England
- Language: English
- Website: Bass Guitar website
- ISSN: 1476-5217
- OCLC: 1368084037

Bass Guitar is a UK-based music magazine established in 2003 and continuing to the present day. The magazine was originally a bi-monthly publication until 2009 when it became monthly. The magazine has featured articles and tuition columns from a long list of world-renowned bassists, including Nick Beggs, pop and progressive rock veteran; Jeff Berlin, jazz legend; Steve Lawson, solo artist; Alex Webster of Cannibal Corpse; Suzy Starlite of the Starlite Campbell Band; Paolo Gregoletto of Trivium; Michael McKeegan of Therapy?; Ruth Goller, jazz educator and session bassist; and Paul Geary, session bassist with George Michael, Lisa Stansfield, Westlife and many others.

In 2016, the magazine was bought by Future Publishing, which acquired the American Bass Player magazine two years later and subsequently merged the two publications. In 2020, Bass Guitar changed its name to Bass Player UK.
