= Monika Herzig =

German-born jazz pianist (born 1964)

- Born: Germany
- Genres: Jazz, pop
- Occupations: Musician, teacher
- Instrument: Piano
- Years active: 1987–present
- Labels: Owl, Whaling City Sound
- Website: www.monikaherzig.com

Academic background
- Education: Indiana University School of Music
- Thesis: Elements of jazz piano pedagogy: A content analysis (1997)
- Doctoral advisor: David Baker

Academic work
- Discipline: Music education
- Sub-discipline: Jazz
- Institutions: Indiana University

Monika Herzig (born 1964) is a German-born jazz pianist.

After receiving a scholarship in 1987 from the pedagogical institute in Weingarten, Germany for a one-year exchange program at the University of Alabama, she moved to the United States in August 1988. Later, she completed her Doctorate in Music Education with a minor in Jazz Studies at Indiana University School of Music, where she is a faculty member in Arts Administration. She Taught at both Indiana University Bloomington and Indianapolis.

She recorded with the jazz fusion group BeebleBrox and has produced four albums as leader of the Monika Herzig Acoustic Project. Peace on Earth was released locally in Indianapolis in 2008 and was released nationally in 2009 on the Owl Studios label. She is the founder and leader of the jazz group Sheroes; the group's self-titled album, Sheroes, was recorded in 2018 and released on Whaling City Sound.

== Awards and honors ==
- 1994 Best Original Composition, "Let's Fool One" Down Beat
- 1994–1996 Two times finalist with BeebleBrox, winner with Oliver Nelson Jr., WTPI Winter Jazzfest Competition, Indianapolis
- 2000, 2003, 2005 Individual Artist Grant recipient, Indiana Arts Commission
- 2015 Jazz Journalist Association Hero

== Discography ==
- Melody without Words (Acme, 2000)
- Melody with Harmony (Acme, 2003)
- In Your Own Sweet Voice (Owl, 2005)
- What Have You Gone and Done? (Owl, 2007)
- Peace on Earth, (Owl, 2009)
- Come with Me (Owl, 2011)
- Whole World in Her Hands (Whaling City Sound, 2016)
- Sheroes (Whaling City Sound, 2018)
- Eternal Dance (Savant, 2020)
- Both Sides of Joni (ACME, 2023)
- All In Good Time (Zoho, 2024)
- Transparent (Key of B Records, 2026)
