= Mission Zero =

American indie pop band

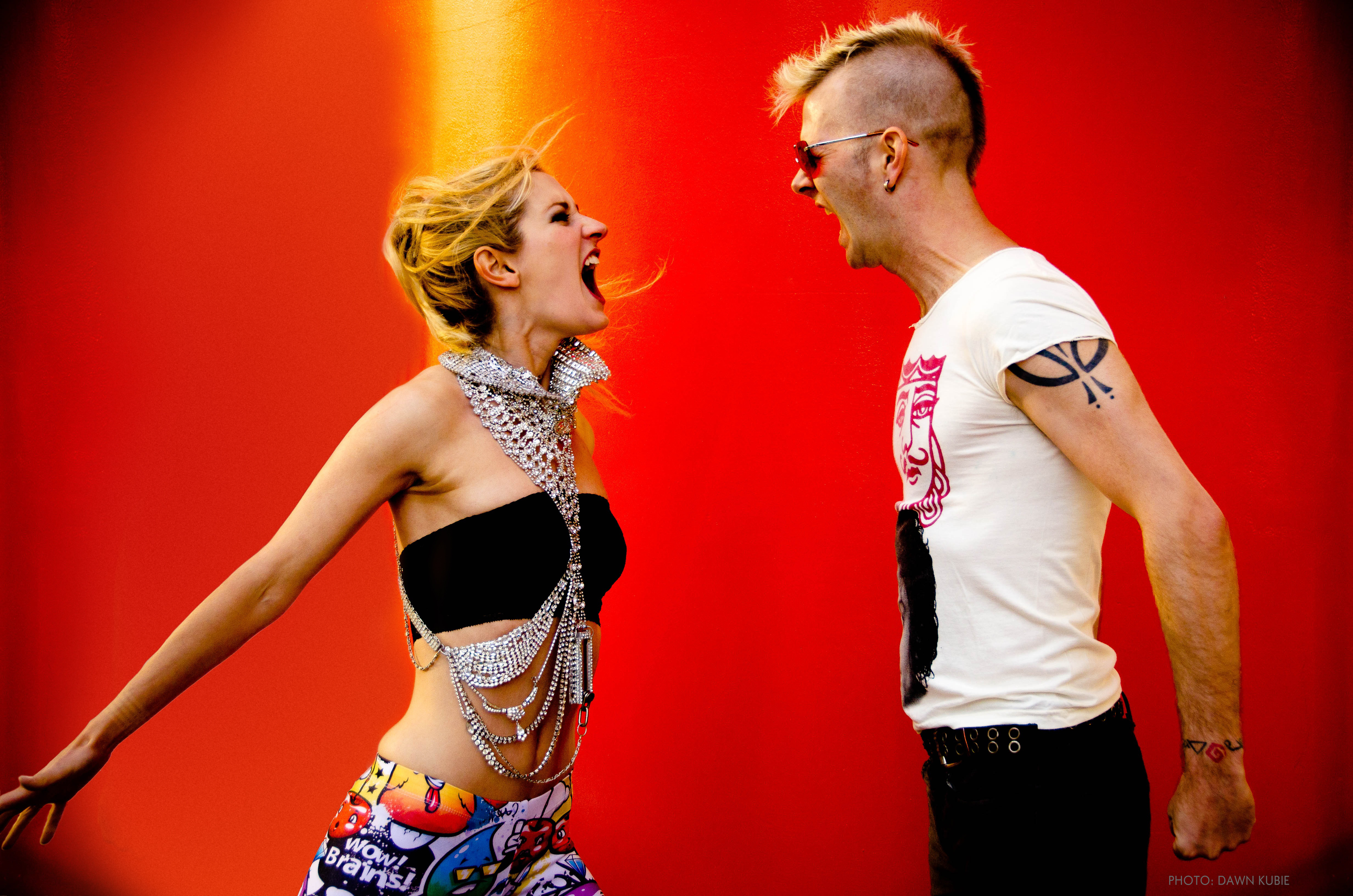
Mission Zero (Chenot and David Keith) photo by Dawn Kubie

Mission Zero is an American indie pop band based in New Haven, CT. Started in 2010 by siblings David Keith and singer/multi-instrumentalist Chenot (born Megan Keith), the duo has released three albums. In May 2015 they headlined at the Whisky a Go Go in Los Angeles, CA.

== Discography ==
- People in Glass Yachts (2015)
- Sky Candy (2013)
- Bruises on the Map (2011)
