= Kai Eckhardt =

German born musician and composer (born 1961)

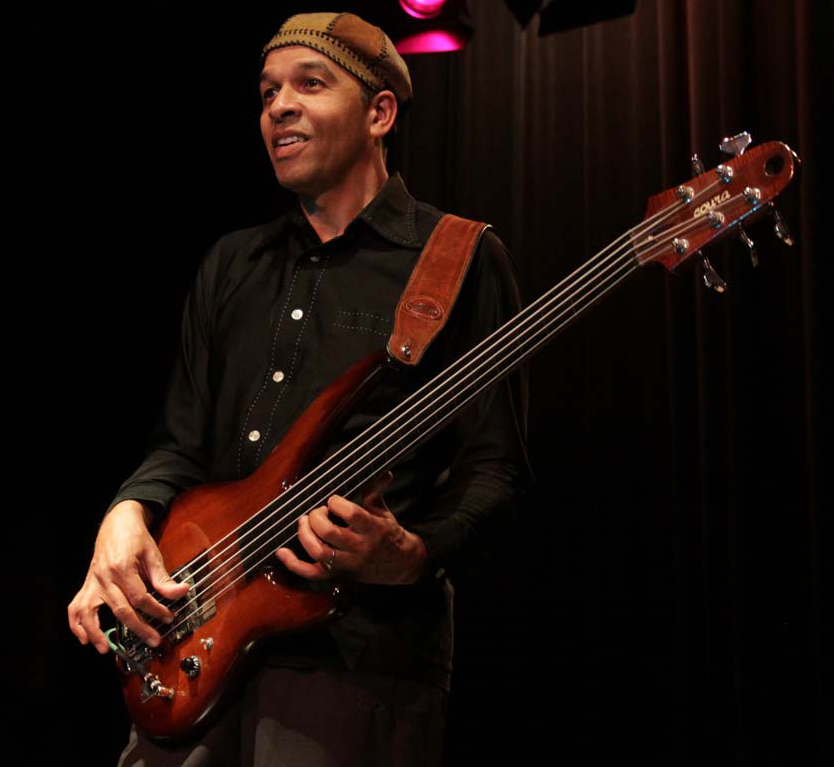
- Eckhardt in performance with the Kai Eckhardt Band in 2015

Background information
- Born: 15 June 1961
- Origin: Germany
- Genres: Funk, jazz, jazz fusion, world music
- Occupations: Musician, songwriter
- Instrument: Bass guitar
- Website: kaieckhardt.com

Kai Eckhardt (born 15 June 1961) is a German born musician and composer who plays bass, best known for his work with John McLaughlin, Vital Information, Torsten de Winkel, Billy Cobham and Garaj Mahal—a band he co-founded. Educated at the prestigious Berklee College of Music Eckhardt has also collaborated on projects with guitarist Larry Coryell as well as keyboardist Tom Coster. Eckhardt is known for his fast chordal slap-style abilities, and for his unique combination of funk, jazz, and world music.

== History ==
Eckhardt began to play bass guitar at age 15. His first major undertaking came in 1985 when European guitar prodigy Torsten de Winkel asked him to join his recording ensemble with Michael Brecker and Alphonse Mouzon, making quite a splash in the European scene, and later his touring band with Ernie Watts and Steve Smith, leading to an invitation to Eckhardt and Torsten to join Smith's US-based group Vital Information. The two German musicians also appeared together in a TV production with Randy Brecker and Simon Phillips.

Meanwhile, he had accepted a scholarship to the Berklee College of Music and began to establish himself in the US, working with the likes of Aydin Esen, Stanley Clarke, Tiger Okoshi and Bob Moses. In 1988 Kai joined the John Mclaughlin Trio with percussionist Trilok Gurtu and John McLaughlin. The trio toured extensively in the years to come and recorded a number of albums, including Que Alegria in 1992. Afterwards, Eckhardt moved to the San Francisco bay area and turned his attention to composing, while performing with the Billy Cobham International Quartet and with Garaj Mahal.

In 2000, he released his first CD as a leader, entitled "Honour Simplicity, Respect the Flow" and featuring Aydın Esen, Courtney Pine, Zakir Hussain and others. In 2008, he appeared on the CD of the UNESCO endorsed Bimbache Jazz y Raices global encounter project and reconnected with Torsten de Winkel, leading to renewed collaborations of the two in Garaj Mahal and later in de Winkel's group Idiot Savants. He is also working with his own new group the Kai Eckhardt Band (which released an album entitled Zeitgeist in 2014). Eckhardt also runs a mentor-ship program for young musicians.

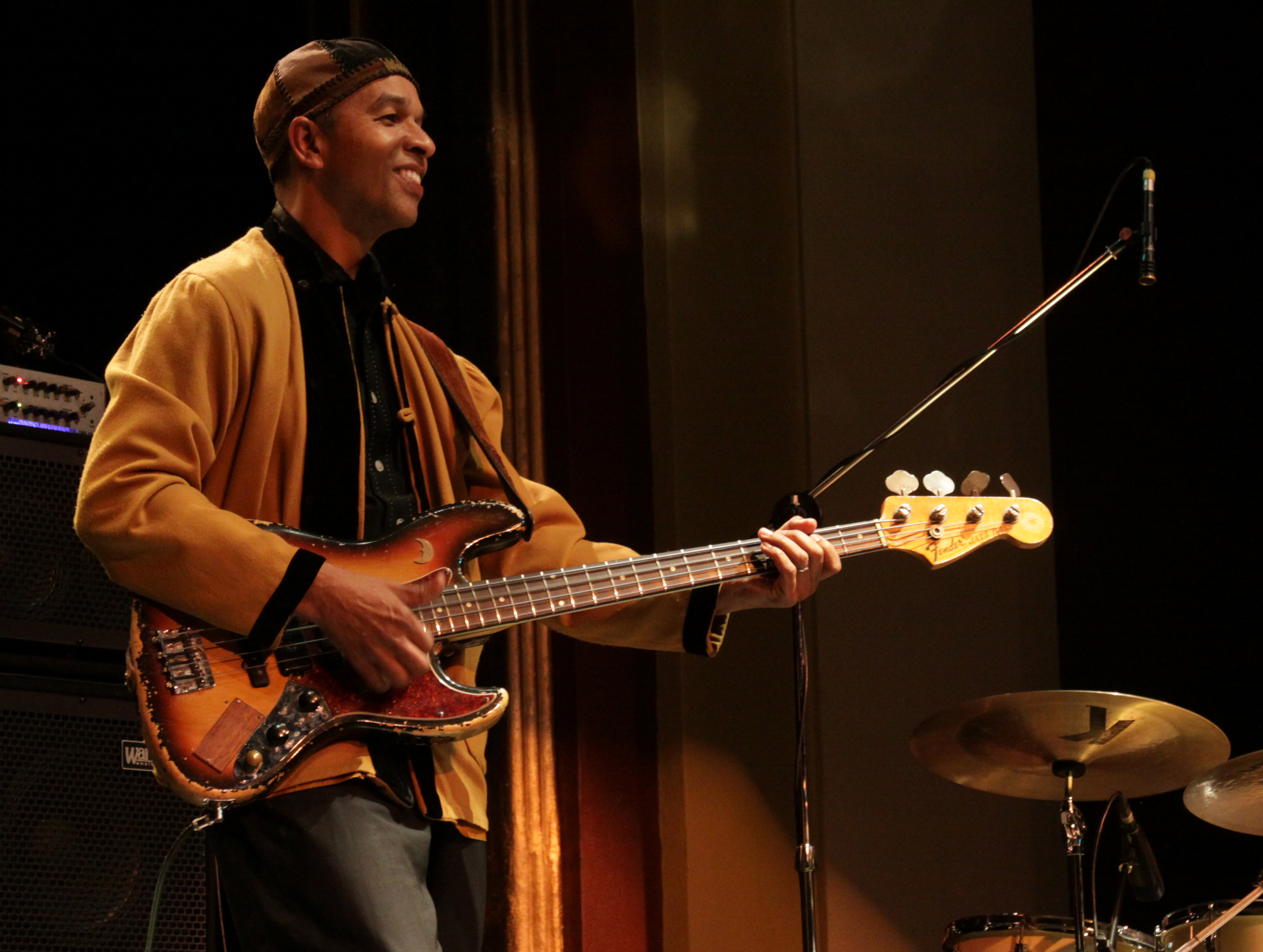
Eckhardt performing 2015

Eckhardt was a co-leader and co-producer of the influential jam band Garaj Mahal. The band played over 1000 shows in the US and Canada between 2000 and 2010. Garaj Mahal released 9 albums during those years and won the independent music awards in the Jam Band category in 2007. In August 2011 Garaj Mahal put an end to touring and there are currently no plans for future shows.

== Discography ==
- Tuba Insight (Deda Music 2015)
- Kai Eckhardt Band - Zeitgeist (Area 61 Records 2014)
- Kai Eckhardt - Atomic Bass: Reactive Intervals (Truefire 2014) Instructional DVD
- George Brooks' Summit Spirit and Spice (Earth Brother Music 2010)
- Rad Getting Down is Free (7 Bridges recordings 2009)
- Bimbache Jazz y Raíces - La Condición Humana (nyjg/ESC 2008), with Gregoire Maret, Torsten de Winkel, Maria Mérida and others
- Tribute to Mahavishnu : Visions of an Inner Mounting Apocalypse (Tone Center 2005)
- Bill Douglas Sky (Tala Records 2005)
- Zigaboo Modeliste "I'm on the Right Track" (JZM 2004)
- Kai Eckhardt - Honour Simplicity, Respect the Flow (2000) with Aydın Esen, Courtney Pine, Zakir Hussain and others
- Maria Joao : Fabula (Verve 1996)
- Curandero - Aras (Silver Wave 1996), with Ty Burhoe, Miguel Espinoza, and Bela Fleck
- Aziza Mustafa Zadeh: Dance of Fire (Columbia 1995)
- John McLaughlin - Que Alegria (Verve Records 1992), with John McLaughlin, Trilok Gurtu and Dominique DiPiazza
- John McLaughlin Trio - Live at the Royal Festival Hall (JMT 1989), with John McLaughlin, Trilok Gurtu
- Torsten de Winkel - Mastertouch (EMI 1985), with Michael Brecker, Alphonse Mouzon and others
- Steve Smith's Vital Information - Fia Fiaga (Columbia/Sony 1988), with Frank Gambale, Torsten de Winkel and others
- BassTalk (HotWire 1989)

=== With Garaj Mahal ===
- Live Vol. 1 (2003)
- Live Vol. 2 (2003)
- Live Vol. 3 (2003)
- Mondo Garaj (2003)
- Blueberry Cave (2005)
- Woot (2008)
- More Mr. Nice Guy (2010)
- Discovery (2010)
