= Garaj Mahal =

American musical group

- Genres: Jazz fusion, jam band, funk
- Years active: 2000–2011, 2018
- Labels: Harmonized, Owl
- Members: Fareed Haque; Kai Eckhardt; Greg Fundis; Mitchel Forman
- Past members: Alan Hertz; Eric Levy
- Website: www.garajmahal.us

Garaj Mahal is a jazz fusion band formed in 2000 that combines jazz, rock, Indian music, and funk. The band consists of Fareed Haque (guitar), Kai Eckhardt (bass), Sean Rickman (drums), and Eric Levy (keyboards). Garaj Mahal allows its music to be recorded at concerts.

In early 2007, Mahal's Blueberry Cave won Best Jam Album in the 6th Annual Independent Music Awards.

== Discography ==
- Live Vol. 1 (Harmonized, 2003)
- Live Vol. 2 (Harmonized, 2003)
- Live Vol. 3 (Harmonized, 2003)
- Mondo Garaj (Harmonized, 2003)
- Blueberry Cave (Harmonized, 2005)
- w00t (Owl, 2008)
- More Mr. Nice Guy (Owl, 2010)
- Discovery:The Moog Guitar (2010)
- Rotifer (Wahdude Music 2025)
