= Indy Jazz Fest =

Annual jazz festival in Indianapolis, Indiana, US

The Indy Jazz Fest is an annual jazz festival in Indianapolis, Indiana. It first took place on June 17, 1999. It was created by a consortium of Downtown Indianapolis hospitality, civic and business interests as a way to spotlight Indianapolis' rich jazz heritage through an annual event. The hope was to have a tourist weekend event that was arts-related, as opposed to the many sporting events held each year in Indianapolis, the Indianapolis 500, the Brickyard 400 as well the occasional NCAA championship or Super Bowl.

A planning committee was formed by these business interests, which brought on an event planning company and a full-time director of booking and operations to plan and manage the event. It was determined that the event would be a multi-day, multi-venue festival, culminating in a multi-stage outdoor event called the Bank One Jazz & Roots Fair at White River State Park in Downtown Indianapolis. A $2 million budget was used to stage the event, which included artists such as B.B. King, Isaac Hayes, Chaka Khan, Sonny Rollins, Los Lobos, Robert Cray, Branford Marsalis, George Benson, Chris Isaak and Freddie Hubbard. A spotlight on local jazz legends was called Indiana Avenue Revisited, including Slide Hampton, David Baker, Buddy Montgomery and Jimmy Coe.

The second festival included performances by Al Green, Ray Charles, Dave Brubeck, Booker T. & the M.G.'s, Jonny Lang, Shemekia Copeland, The Yellowjackets, Cassandra Wilson, and Béla Fleck and the Flecktones. The festival did have to cancel the first night due to an unseasonable downpour, and heavy rains off and on throughout the weekend caused a $750,000 budget shortfall and the organization accumulated a large amount of debt as a result. Afterward the consortium continued to manage the festival for a few years until the American Piano Awards took over operations in the early 2000s until 2008. At that time the American Piano Awards stopped running the festival and the naming rights were bought by J. Allan Hall and Rob Dixon (who are also both involved in the Indianapolis record label Owl Studios) and David Allee, owner of the Jazz Kitchen. The new ownership decided to reinvent the Indy Jazz Fest as a non-profit organization and began formulating and implementing educational outreach initiatives throughout Indianapolis Public Schools. Children from all walks of life have been exposed to jazz and other musical genres because of Indy Jazz Fest's work in the community. The Jazz Fest was traditionally held on Father's Day weekend, but starting in 2009, the Festival moved to the last week of September.

== See also ==
- List of attractions and events in Indianapolis
