= Moog Guitar =

Electric guitar manufactured by Moog Music

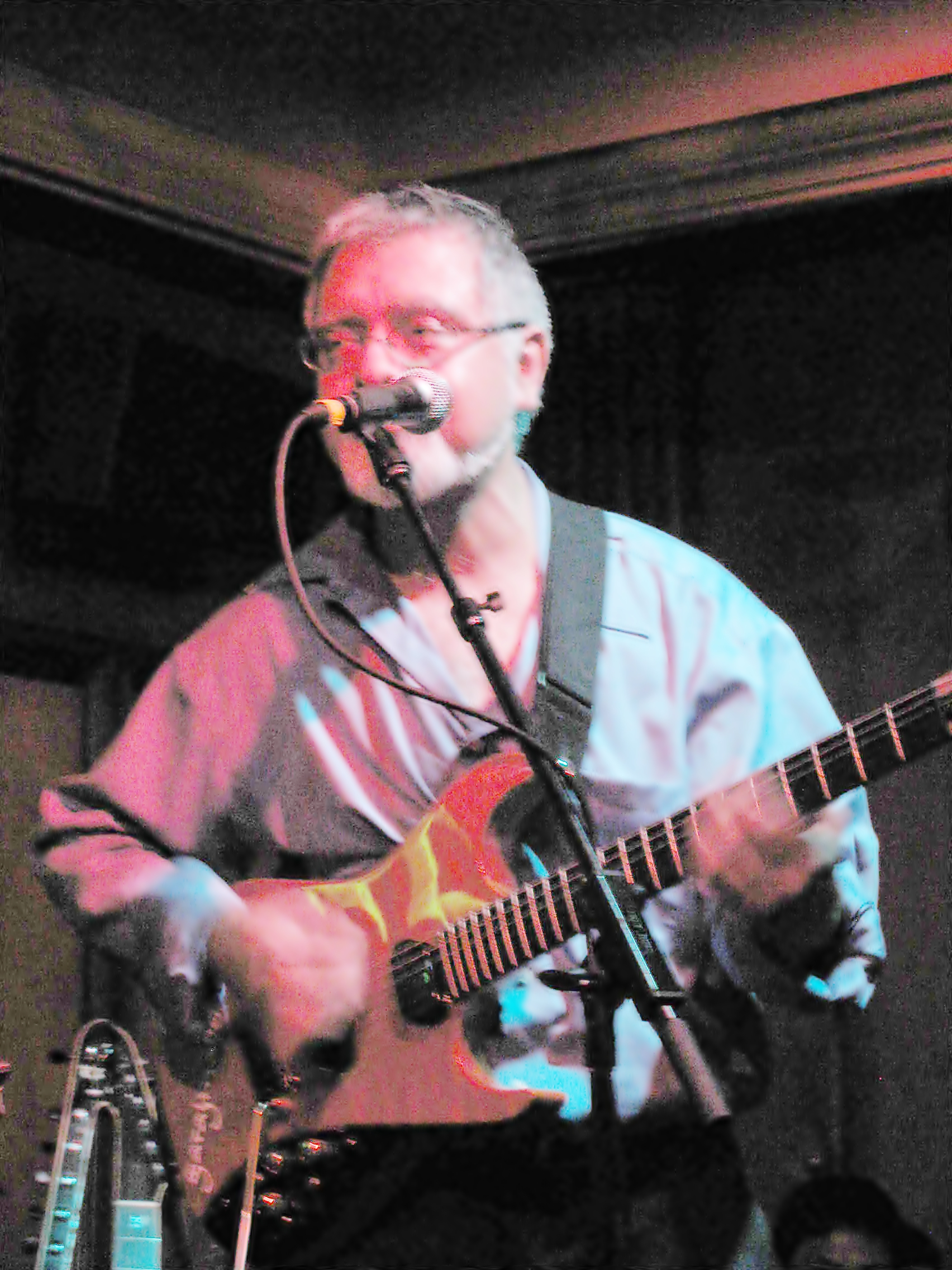
A Moog Guitar played by Fareed Haque (Green Mill Jazz Club, Chicago, July 2009)

The Moog Guitar is an electric guitar developed in 2008 by Paul Vo (official name Paul Ierymenko) that controls the level of energy within the strings of the guitar to modify the capabilities of the guitar. The guitar can send energy into strings to allow for infinite note sustain or the guitar can pull energy from the strings to create a short, staccato sound. The guitar also possesses harmonic blend control, allowing for new types of guitar harmonics to come out of the instrument. Unlike other technologies that help a guitar sustain notes, the Moog Guitar is unique as it is able to sustain notes on all six strings at once. All Moog Guitars except the custom shop ones built by Paul Vo, were Korean made guitars with Moog electronics.

== History ==
Paul Vo's inspiration came from the futuristic sounds Jimi Hendrix created by exploring the guitar's acoustic properties. Since its release at the summer NAMM Show in 2008, the guitar has been used by Joey Santiago, Lou Reed, Daft Punk, Trent Reznor, Kaki King, and Fareed Haque. It continues to turn up on various recordings such as the Paul Simon's So Beautiful or So What (2011) and Brian Eno's Lux (2012).

In 2013 Vo launched a crowdfunding campaign on Kickstarter to sell the Vo-96, a guitar electronics kit intended to offer what he called an "'inventor's version'" of the Moog Guitar technology. According to Vo nearly 100 Vo-96 systems of various kinds were sold through the campaign. Vo then turned his attention to the Wond and the EMPick (or Wond II), handheld magnetic string vibrators roughly similar to the EBow.

== Features ==
=== Full Sustain Mode ===
This feature allows the guitar to infinitely sustain notes at any volume, at any string, and at any fret position.

=== Mute Mode ===
Contrary to full sustain mode, this feature removes the sustain from every note to create a unique staccato sound.

=== Controlled Sustain Mode ===
This feature combines both full sustain mode and mute mode to sustain the notes being played and mute the strings that are not being played.

=== Harmonic Blending ===
This feature involves using a foot pedal to shift between full sustain mode and mute mode, allowing for the playing of unique harmonic sounds that would otherwise not be possible with the conventional techniques of creating natural or artificial harmonics.

=== Moog Filter ===
This feature allows the frequency of the guitar's outputs to be toggled to create additional unique sounds.

== Design ==
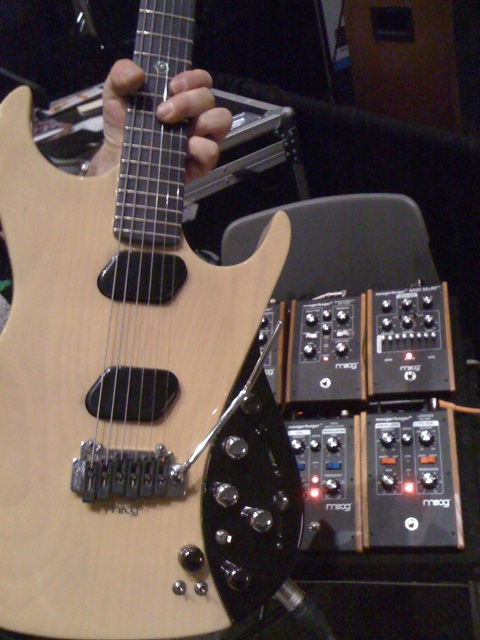
Moog Guitar (left) Moogerfoogers (right)

The variety of the Moog Guitar's features are a product of its on-board circuitry. The guitar is outfitted with two custom Moog pickups. In addition, the guitar features piezo saddles in the bridge that use piezoelectric sensors to pick up sounds acoustically and with less feedback than conventional pickups. The Moog pickups hold the guitar's ability to control the levels of energy within each string. Within these pickups are six separate transducers that feed energy back into the strings magnetically. Although standard strings work with the guitar, Moog provides strings with a different magnetic make-up to facilitate the guitar's ability to control string energy levels.

The guitar features five knobs and three switches. The Vo Power knob controls the intensity of sustain and mute while the harmonic balance knob controls the balance of sustain and mute between the bridge and the neck. Additionally, the guitar offers a knob for piezo blend that combines the piezo bridge pick-up signal into the guitar's output signal. The last two knobs are conventional volume and tone knobs. The mode selector switch switches between full sustain, mute, and controlled sustain mode while the filter toggle switch controls the articulation of the Moog Filter. Last of all, the guitar features a conventional five position pick-up selector.

== Commendations ==
- Guitar Player Magazine's 2009 Reader's Choice Award
- Electronic Musician Magazine's 2009 Editor's Choice Award
- 2008 Summer NAMM "Best In Show"
- 2008 “Best of What’s New Award” from Popular Science Magazine
- 2009 Mix Foundation TEC Award

== Models ==
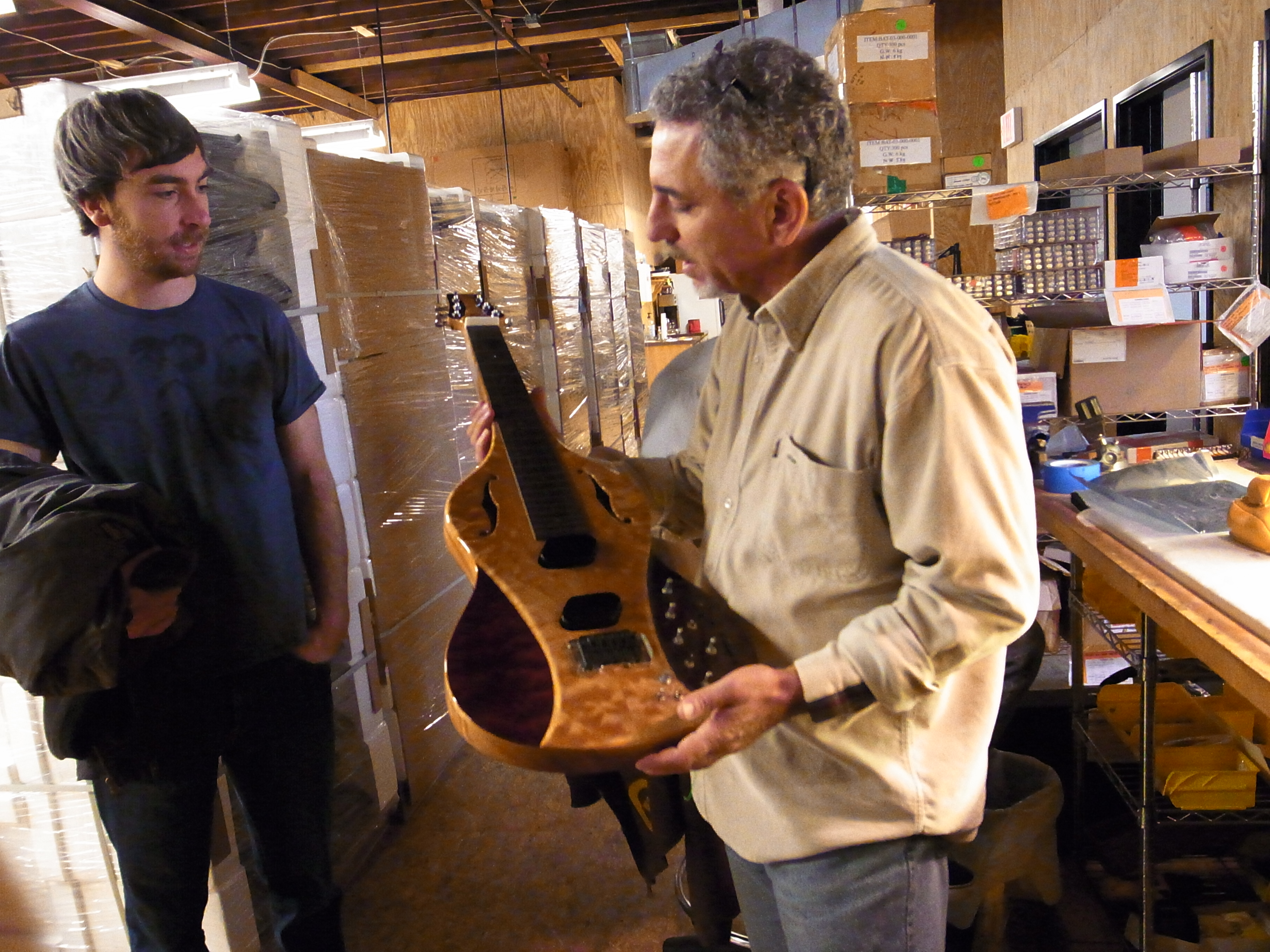
Moog Lap Steel

- Moog Guitar Model E1 - Black
- Moog Guitar Model E1 - Red
- Moog Guitar Model E1 - Butterscotch
- Moog Guitar Model E1-M (factory upgrade added 13-pin guitar synth connection "MIDI")
- Moog Lap Steel
- Paul Vo Collector's Edition
