= Jared Gold =

American fashion designer

- Born: 2 May 1972 (age 54); Idaho, U.S.
- Education: Otis Parson's School of Design

Jared Gold (born 2 May 1972) is a fashion designer of avant-garde American Gothic fashion.

== Biography ==
Jared Gold, Quiet Army, Dress

Gold grew up in Idaho Falls, Idaho and was a child piano prodigy long before he discovered fashion design. In 1990 he attended the Piano Conservatory of Hawaii for a year and soon after took up the harpsichord. Gold trained at Los Angeles' Otis Parson's School of Design. Gold is lead designer for his clothing company Black Chandelier. Gold has been creating fashion for men women and children since 1992, and shows his collections at events in Los Angeles as well as New York City. His collections are based in antiquated imagery, and use Victorian sewing details. Gold is the originator of the jewelled Giant Madagascar Hissing cockroach worn as jewelry known as the "Roach Brooch".

== Fashion shows and media appearances ==
Jared Gold's Czarina fashion show on March 14, 2008 was well reviewed in The Daily Titan, the student newspaper of Cal State Fullerton, which said Gold made the runway his "playground." In May 2006, he appeared as a guest judge on America's Next Top Model, in an episode that also featured his cockroach jewelry. In March 2009 Gold appeared as a special guest judge on Germany's Next Topmodel, hosted by Heidi Klum. Jared is known for his close friendship with writer Clint Catalyst. Metro Mix, a free nightlife guide in Los Angeles, said Catalyst is Gold's "muse." Catalyst has been hired as an event producer for some of Gold's fashion shows. In November 2009, the duo released their first collaborative design effort: a set of prize ribbons with awards such as "Epic" and "Hedonist."

Jared Gold, Caspian, Runway Collection, Salt Lake City

Gold appeared on Germany's Next Top Model hosted by Heidi Klum, along with Jessicka and Catalyst on March 5, 2009.
