= Frank Glover =

- Born: June 27, 1963; Indianapolis, Indiana, U.S.
- Genres: Jazz
- Occupations: Musician, composer, arranger
- Instruments: Clarinet, Saxophone
- Label: Owl

Frank Glover (born June 27, 1963) is a contemporary jazz musician and composer from Indianapolis, Indiana. Although he plays saxophone as well, Glover's primary instrument is the clarinet. For decades, his mentor and collaborator was Indianapolis jazz pianist Claude Sifferlen. Glover is based in southern Indiana where he teaches music theory and improvisation from his studio near the T.C. Steele Historic Site.

== Discography ==
- Mosaic (1991)
- Something Old, Something New (1994)
- Siamese Twins (1999)
- Politico (Owl, 2005)
- Abacus (Owl, 2010)
- Mīm (2019)
