= Wanees Zarour =

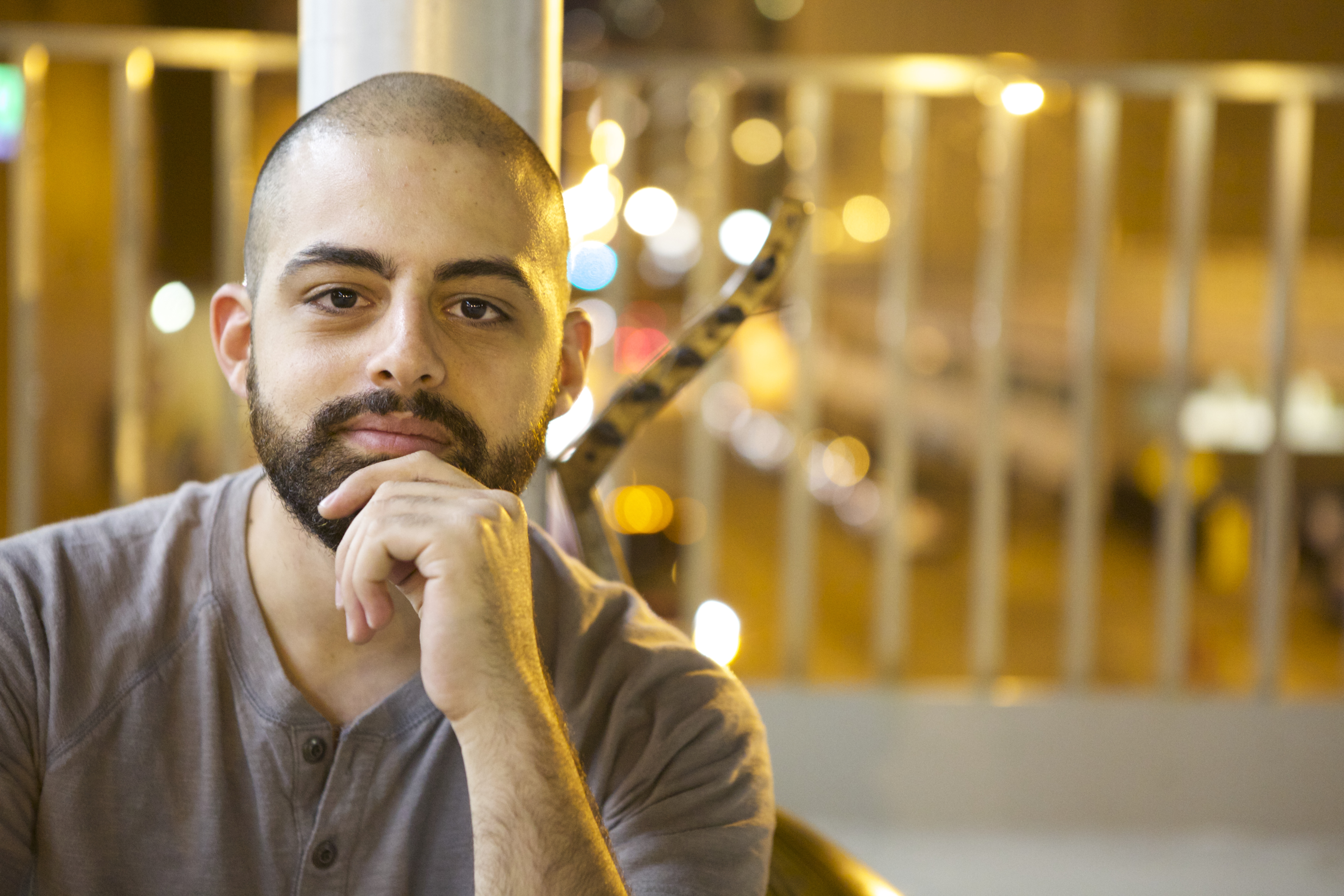
- Wanees Zarour. Photo by Fadi Freij.

Background information
- Born: Ramallah, Palestine
- Genre: World Music
- Occupations: Musician; composer; director; educator
- Instruments: Oud; buzuq; violin; percussion
- Years active: 2000–present
- Website: waneeszarour.com

Wanees Zarour (born in Ramallah) is a Chicago-based music award-winning composer, arranger, multi-instrumentalist, and music director based in Chicago. Focusing on contemporary Middle Eastern Music, he is an accomplished oud, buzuq, percussion and violin player, having been featured in many international music festivals.

His work draws on Arabic maqam traditions, jazz, and contemporary ensemble music, with an emphasis on composition and cross-cultural collaboration.

Zarour has directed the University of Chicago Middle East Orchestra since 2010 and co-directs the Chicago Immigrant Orchestra with guitarist Fareed Haque. He is also the founder and leader of East Loop, an ensemble performing his original compositions combining Arabic musical traditions with jazz.

He recordings include Quarter to Midnight (2014) and Silwan (2026). He is the recipient of the Chicago Esteemed Artist Award (2021), 3Arts Award (2024) and the 3Arts Next Level Award (2026).

== Musical career ==
Born in Ramallah, Palestine, Zarour has trained as a musician from the age of 7. He began with violin and quickly picked up oud, buzuq, and percussion. He has been invited to perform in major music and concerts around the world in ensemble and solo performances, including American Public Media's A Prairie Home Companion, Chicago's World Music Festival, and Hyde Park Jazz Festival.

Zarour specializes in Maqam music, teaching classes and leading ensembles mainly in the Chicago area. His compositions often fuse traditional Middle Eastern instrumentation and Maqam theory together with musical traditions ranging from free jazz to Eastern European folk, and Latin American Music such as Bossa Nova.

As of 2021, Zarour has for some years been the Director of the Middle East Orchestra at The University of Chicago, which performs a wide variety of traditional and contemporary Middle Eastern music, featuring Arab, Turkish and Persian repertoire. He also taught Maqam Theory and Middle Eastern Rhythm as a faculty member at the Old Town School of Folk Music.

Since 2019, guitarist Fareed Haque and Wanees Zarour restarted the Chicago Immigrant Orchestra, with the encouragement and financial support of the Chicago World Music Festival and the Old Town School of Folk Music. (The orchestra's original incarnation ran from 1999 to 2004, led by Willy Schwartz.) Haque and Zarour have cultivated a diverse roster of Chicago based global musicians from the Immigrant Community.

=== Discography ===
Year	Title	Ensemble
2026	Silwan	East Loop
2025	Sanctuary	Chicago Immigrant Orchestra
2014	Quarter to Midnight	Wanees Zarour Ensemble
2011	"Balad El Mahbub" on Folk Songs of Illinois #4, compiled by Bucky Halker	Duzan Ensemble
2010	Being Piece (by Issa Boulos)	Issa Boulos (Composer, Oud, Guitar); Wanees Zarour (Buzuq, Violin, Percussion)
