= Cynthia Layne =

American singer-songwriter

- Born: February 27, 1963; Dayton, Ohio, U.S.
- Died: January 18, 2015 (aged 51) Indianapolis, Indiana, U.S.
- Genres: Jazz; neo soul
- Occupation: Singer
- Instrument: Vocals
- Years active: 1990–2015
- Label: Owl

Cynthia Layne (February 27, 1963 – January 18, 2015) was an American jazz and neo soul singer. Layne performed around the world singing in many styles. She signed with Indianapolis jazz label Owl Studios in 2006. She worked with Rob Dixon and Reggie Bishop.

She died of breast cancer at the age of 51 on January 18, 2015.

== Discography ==
- In Due Time (2001)
- Reality (2004)
- Beautiful Soul (Owl, 2007)
