= Leo Rising (Frank Foster album) =

Studio album by Frank Foster
- Released: 1997
- Recorded: August 23–24, 1996
- Studio: New York City
- Genre: Jazz
- Length: 62:40
- Label: Arabesque; AJ-124
- Producer: Frank Foster, Daniel Criss

Frank Foster chronology
| A Fresh Taste of Thad Jones and Frank Foster (1994) | Leo Rising (1997) | Swing (1998) |

Leo Rising is an album by saxophonist Frank Foster which was recorded in 1996 and released on the Arabesque label the following year.

== Reception ==
Professional ratings
Review scores
| Source | Rating |
|---|---|
| AllMusic | 4.5/5 stars |
| The Penguin Guide to Jazz Recordings | 3.5/4 stars |

The AllMusic review by Scott Yanow said "This is one of Frank Foster's finest small-group dates and is highly recommended". In JazzTimes, Bill Shoemaker called it "a balm-like program that will quell the most righteous outrage", observing that "Foster’s art lies in his projection of a relaxed energy, a combination of a quick wit, acute insights, and graceful execution ... Foster’s solos are lean and muscular".

== Track listing ==
All compositions by Frank Foster except where noted

1. "You're Only as Old as You Look" – 8:07
2. "Simone" – 12:14
3. "Gray Thursday" – 7:18
4. "Cidade Alto" – 3:30
5. "Leo Rising" – 8:06
6. "When April Comes Again" (Paul Weston, Doris Schaefer) – 5:29
7. "Last Night When We Were Young" (Harold Arlen, Yip Harburg) – 11:19
8. "Derricksteriy" – 6:32

== Personnel ==
- Frank Foster – tenor saxophone, soprano saxophone
- Derrick Gardner – trumpet (tracks 5 & 8)
- Stephen Scott – piano
- Christian McBride – double bass
- Lewis Nash – drums
