= Matthew Kaminski (musician) =

American organist

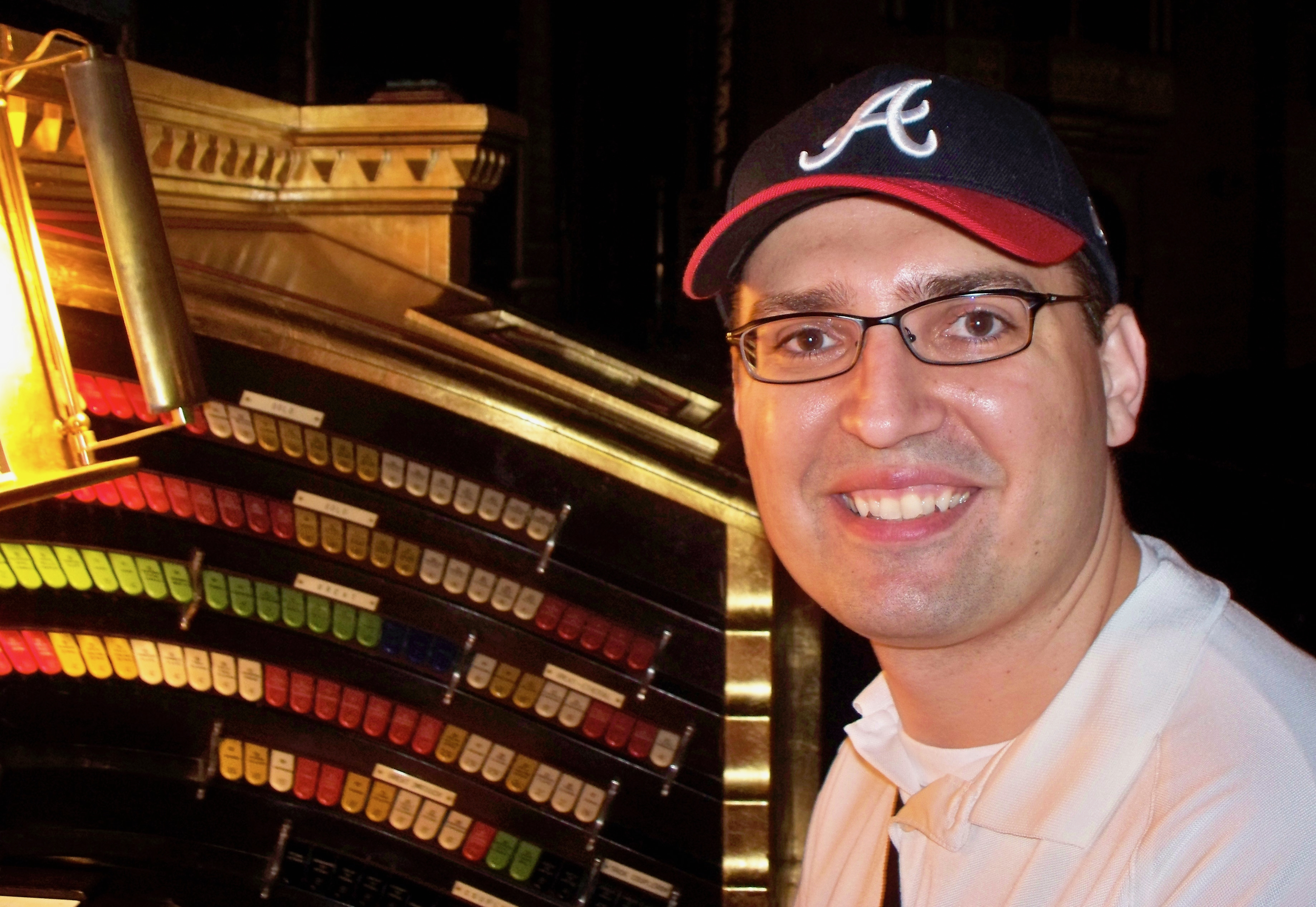
- Selfie by Kaminski in August 2010
- Born: 1976 or 1977 (age 49–50)
- Education: Georgia State University (BMus, MMus)
- Occupation: Stadium organist
- Website: matthewkaminski.com

Matthew Kaminski (born 1976 or 1977 (age 49–50)) is an American musician who is the stadium organist for the Atlanta Braves baseball team. He is known internationally for his use of Twitter to interact with fans to select walk-on music for members of the opposing teams. The BBC News featured Kaminski's use of social media to crowdsource ideas for amusing or pointed walkup songs, and Sports Illustrated accused him of "expertly trolling" with his musical choices.

== Early life and education ==
Matthew Kaminski grew up in Chicago, in a Polish-American family and began playing the Hammond organ at age five. His father, grandfather, and great-grandfather all played the accordion. He studied piano at the University of Arizona jazz studies program then moved to Atlanta where he graduated from Georgia State University in 2000 with a Bachelor of Music and an emphasis in jazz studies. He received a Master of Music from Georgia State University in 2011 while working for the Braves.

== Baseball organist ==
Matthew Kaminski was selected as organist for the Atlanta Braves in 2009. In an interview with Atlanta's NPR affiliate, Kaminski introduced his album, Stadium Organ Sounds (2013). National Public Radio, Washington correspondent, Todd Zwillich, featured Kaminski in The Takeaway in his series, Ballpark Figures: The Unsung Heroes of Baseball in 2015. In 2019 he released Baseball Organ in Hi-Fi. He played at Truist Park for his 13th season in 2021.

In 2022 Kaminski played his first minor league game for the Augusta GreenJackets, at SRP Park.

Kaminski is also the University of Georgia baseball organist playing at Foley Field in Athens, Georgia, for the Bulldogs, and for the Auburn University Tigers at Plainsman Park. He was interviewed on "At the Mic" in February 2021 about the strategy behind his choice of walk-up songs for the opposing team and the experience of playing during COVID.

On October 2, 2021 Kaminski played his 1000th game for the Atlanta Braves. Kaminski played the National Anthem, The Star-Spangled Banner, at the National League Championship Series, Game 2, October 17, 2021. He was quoted in the Georgia State University Magazine about his walk-up songs: “I want the fans to have that game within the game.

Highlighting the 2021 World Series Associated Press writer, Paul Newberry noted, "There are plenty of stars at this World Series, from Freddie Freeman to Jose Altuve, but let’s give a shout-out to the bespectacled, 44-year-old jazz lover sitting behind the Hammond SK2 organ at Truist Park."

In 2021 with the Atlanta Braves playing in the World Series at home on October 29, 2021, Kaminski was spotlighted at MLB.com as a "not-so-secret-weapon." He was described as "the most notable feature at Atlanta's Truist Park." In the article Kaminski explains how he selects walk-up songs for the opposition with many examples. Kaminski won the first-ever Newby Grammy in 2021. AP Sports Columnist, Paul Newberry, stated the award was for "the witty organist who provided the soundtrack to the Braves' championship season. The jazz lover's eclectic taste in music, and his hilarious selections when opposing players come to the plate, set up a game within every game."

== Performer and educator ==
Kaminski sings, plays piano, and accordion in polka bands. Matthew Kaminski is a member of the Latin Salsa orchestra Orquesta MaCuba, the Western swing band Back in the Saddle, and leads the Georgia Polka Band. Matthew Kaminski is a Hammond Organ/Leslie Speaker Artist and is highlighted at the instrument maker's website as representing a passion for playing the organ. He performs regularly on the Hammond Organ SK1, SK2 and uses Leslie 21 System speakers. Kaminski teaches at The North Fulton School of Music’s Atlanta locations and has taught applied jazz piano at Georgia Tech.

In 2021 Kaminski released the album, L.A. Connection. He was featured on the National Association for Music Education website in 2022.

== Discography ==
- Taking My Time (Chicken Coup, 2010)
- Stadium Organ Sounds (self-released, 2013)
- Swingin' on the New Hammond (Chicken Coup, 2013) featuring Dave Stryker
- Live at Churchill Grounds (Chicken Coup, 2016)
- Baseball Organ in Hi-Fi (self-released, 2019)
- L.A. Connection (Fairfax and 3rd, 2021) featuring Jeff Hamilton and Bruce Forman.
