= John Von Ohlen =

American jazz musician

John Von Ohlen (May 13, 1941 – October 3, 2018) was an American jazz drummer who worked for Woody Herman in 1967 and 1969 as well as with Stan Kenton from 1970 to 1972.

Von Ohlen was born in Indianapolis, Indiana, United States. He began playing trombone in middle school and played in band through high school. He graduated from North Central High School in Indianapolis in 1960. He briefly attended North Texas State University in Denton, Texas, and then returned to Indianapolis.

Von Ohlen led the Blue Wisp Big Band in Cincinnati from 1980 to 2018, and also groups under his own name; they ranged from quartets to big bands. From 1967 to 1968, he toured with Billy Maxted’s Manhattan Jazz Band. In the 1980s and 1990s, Von Ohlen was a member of a big band led by the pianist Steve Allee.

Von Ohlen died on October 3, 2018, in Cincinnati, Ohio at the age of 77.

== Discography ==
- John Von Ohlen – The Baron
- John Von Ohlen & Steve Allee Big Band – Live

With Blue Wisp Big Band

- The Blue Wisp Band of Cincinnati
- Butterfly
- The Smooth One
- Live at Carmelo's
- Rollin' with Von Ohlen
- Tribute
- 20th Anniversary

With Stan Kenton

- Live at Redlands University
- Today
- Live at Brigham Young University
- The Ballad Style of Stan Kenton

With others

- Chuck Carter/Steve Allee Big Band – Downtown Blues
- Woody Herman – Concerto for Herd
- Cal Collins – Crack'd Rib
