= Eight to the Bar (swing band) =

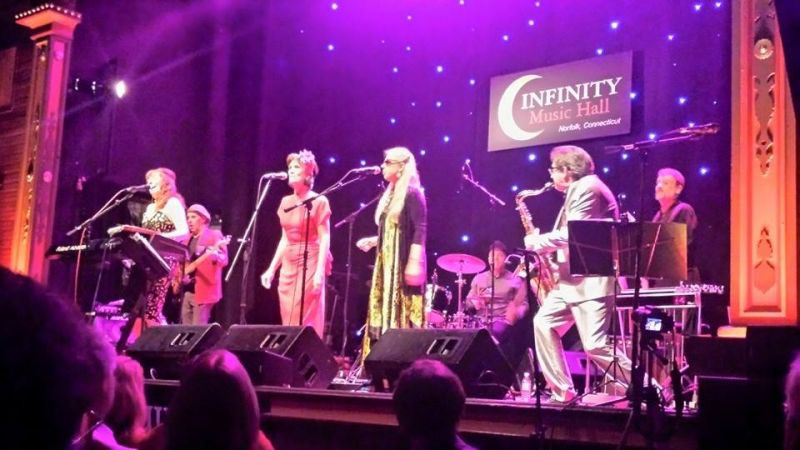
- Eight to the Bar at Infinity Hall in Hartford

Background information
- Origin: Connecticut
- Genres: Swing
- Years active: 1975–present
- Website: eighttothebar.com

Eight to the Bar is an American swing band founded in 1975 in New Haven, Connecticut. They have released thirteen albums and toured both nationally and internationally.

== Foundation ==
Eight to the Bar was founded by keyboardist, vocalist, and songwriter Cynthia Lyon and pedal steel guitar player John Brown in 1975 in New Haven, Connecticut, as a Western-style swing band. The original lineup had eight members, male vocalist Rob Jockel, and Lyon singing lead and backup vocals with her sisters Todd and Barbara Lyon, bassist Tom McNamara, John Brown on pedal steel, drummer John Baker, and guitarist Matt Simpson. It eventually became a seven-piece band, and finally a six-piece band for most of its existence. The music in its early days has been described as “steel guitar-laced sound of old-school swing”, though within a few years they replaced the pedal steel guitar with a saxophone. Its sound evolved to be described as a blend of swing, boogie-woogie, blues, and Motown. They performed both covers and original material.

After several lineup changes, the original band broke up ten years later when Lyon had tired of touring—however they were reassembled less than a year later.

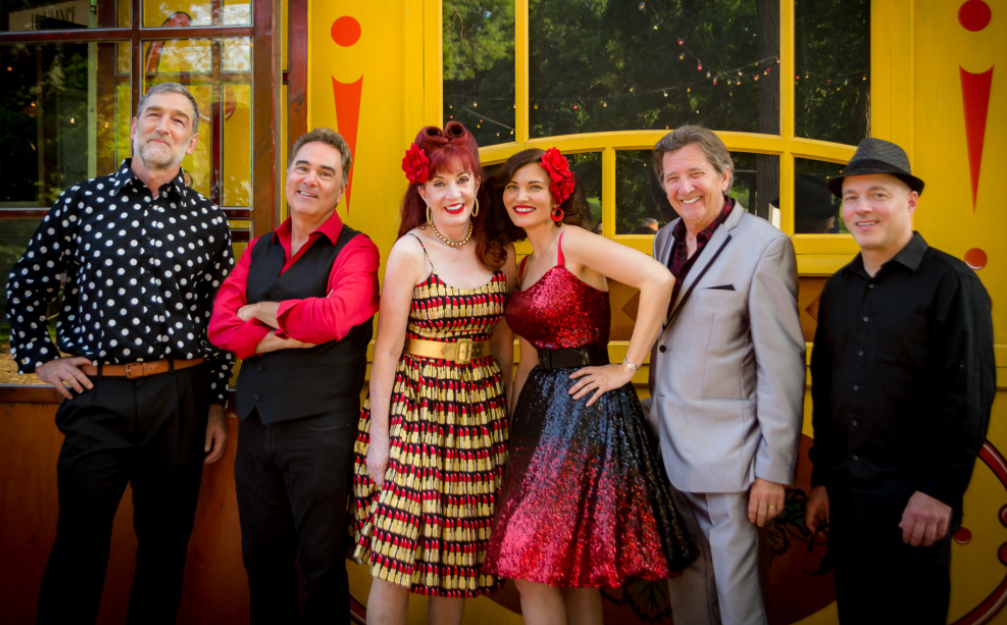

== Reformation ==
Eight to the Bar reconstituted its lineup upon reformation, with the only original member being Lyon. The lineup continued to change, and in 2005 three different previous lineups reunited in order to play the band's thirtieth anniversary concert.

== Touring ==
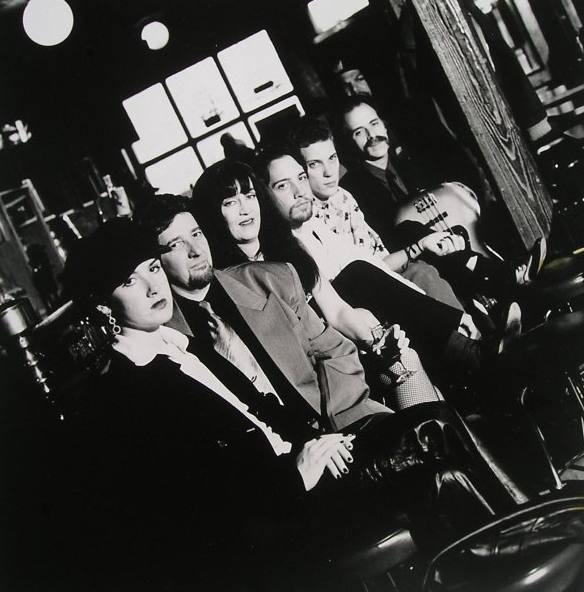
Eight to the Bar, seen here featuring the band members in the 1995 lineup

The band has toured throughout New England, with regular shows in each state, in addition to both the east and west coasts of the US and international tour dates. Among the concerts, they have opened for groups and artists including Big Bad Voodoo Daddy, Manhattan Transfer, Robert Cray, Roy Orbison, and Ray Charles. They have also served as a local band on demand, performing at weddings in addition to their concert hall performances. In 2010 reporter Jay Miller wrote of their touring that "the band is nationally known and frequently tours overseas, but also stays busy with a variety of gigs from weddings to corporate parties to clubs to town concerts in the summer". Another reporter wrote that same year that, "Everyone in Connecticut knows ETTB, either because they played at their own wedding or their best friend's wedding or they saw them play a gig as far away as the Caribbean or as close as The Chowder Pot in Branford." By the 2010s, they were still performing up to 200 concert dates per year. They continue to perform locally as well in the northeastern US, so ch as the Gatehouse Cafe concert series in Waterbury, where they had the highest audience attendance of the musical roster in 2023.

== Recordings ==
The band's first album was The Joint Is Jumpin, which they recorded in 1981 at Toad's Place in New Haven. This was followed by Swingin' School in 1984. After their hiatus, they released their third album, Redheads of Rhythm in 1989. This was followed by Something Old, Something New, Something Rhythm, Something Blues in 1993, Beat Me Rocking in 1996, Behind the Eight Ball in 1998, the album Hey Sailor! in 2001, Superhero Swinger Undercover in 2003, and You Call This Swing? in 2005. Their album Calling All Ickeroos was released in 2007, followed by their 2010 album The Romper Room.

Upon the band's fortieth anniversary in 2015 it released its twelfth album, entitled Bring It & Swing It!. At this stage the longest serving members other than Lyon had been involved since 1989—saxophonist Collin Tilton and bass player/vocalist Mike Corsini. Lyon's husband, Collin Tilton, has also recorded and toured with Van Morrison and Etta James.

In October 2023, the group released their thirteenth album The Light Fantastic, which consisted of thirteen tracks the band called a mix of “Swing, Ballroom, Latin, Jazz, Country, and Blues”.
