= Mondo Garaj =

Studio album by Garaj Mahal
- Released: November 18, 2003
- Recorded: October 8, 2000–May 8, 2001
- Studio: In The Pocket, Talcott Mountain, The Plant, Phelps, Fluffland
- Genre: Jazz fusion
- Length: 47:22
- Label: Harmonized
- Producer: Garaj Mahal, Christian Weyers

Garaj Mahal chronology
Live Vol. 3 (2003)	Mondo Garaj (2003)	Blueberry Cave (2005)

Professional ratings
Review scores
Source	Rating
Allmusic	link
Guitar 9 Records	(not rated) link

Mondo Garaj is the debut studio album and fourth album by jazz fusion band Garaj Mahal.

The album was recorded in late 2000 and early 2001 at In The Pocket Studio in Sonoma County, CA, then mixed/mastered over 2001 and 2002 at Talcott Mountain Studio in Simsbury, CT, The Plant Studios in Sausalito, CA, Phelps Studios in San Francisco, CA, and Fluffland Studio in San Anselmo, CA, and finally released in 2003 on Harmonized Records.

== Track listing ==
- Mondo Garaj (Eckhardt) - 5:33
- Hindi Gumbo (Haque) - 5:31
- Be Dope (Hertz, Levy) - 6:11
- Junct (Haque) - 6:22
- Poodle Factory (Hertz) - 3:51
- The Big Smack Down (Eckhardt) - 0:35
- New Meeting (Hertz) - 8:04
- Beware My Ethnic Heart (Haque) - 9:11
- Madagascar (Hertz, Levy) - 5:21
- Gulam Sabri (Haque) - 7:47
- Bajo (Hertz) - 7:07
- Milk Carton Blues (Levy) - 3:06

== Personnel ==
=== Musical ===
- Fareed Haque - Guitar, Guitar (Electric), Guitar (Steel), Sitar (Electric)
- Alan Hertz - Drums, Art Direction, Mixing, Photography, Cover Photo, Roland Synthesizer
- Eric Levy - Keyboards, Organ (Hammond), Clavinet, Fender Rhodes, Mini Moog, Oberheim OB8, Prophet 5, Sequential Circuits
- Kai Eckhardt - Bass
- Michael Kang - Fiddle, Mandolin
- DJ Fly - Agaric 23 Turntables
- DJ Roto - Turntables, Sampling, Effects

=== Technical ===
- Garaj Mahal - Arranger, Producer, Art Direction, Mixing
- Christian Weyers - Producer, Executive Producer
- Toni Fishman - Executive Producer
- Justin Phelps - Engineer
- John Cuniberti - Mastering Engineer
- Jason Andrew - Assistant Engineer
- Mark Fassler - Assistant Engineer
- Theresa Reed - Photography
- David "Hot Rod" Shuman - Mixing Assistant
