= Buselli–Wallarab Jazz Orchestra =

- Genres: Jazz, swing
- Labels: Owl
- Members: Mark Buselli; Brent Wallarab; Greg Ward; Tom Walsh; Todd Williams; Sophie Faught; Ned Boyd; Clark Hunt; Scott Belck; Jeff Conrad; John Raymond; Tim Coffman; Andrew Danforth; Jeff Parker; Richard Dole; Sean Dobbins; Luke Gillespie; Jeremy Allen

Buselli–Wallarab Jazz Orchestra is a jazz orchestra consisting of seventeen pieces.

BWJO co-founders Mark Buselli and Brent Wallarab are music educators, as well as musicians and composers. Their common commitment to America's jazz heritage brought the BWJO to life and helped define the mission of the organization. They regularly hold concerts and clinics at public schools in Indianapolis.They were inducted into the Indianapolis Jazz Hall of Fame in 2017.

== Brent Wallarab ==
Wallarab is a 1987 graduate of Southern Illinois University Carbondale School of Music and 1989 graduate of Indiana University Bloomington.

Since 1991, Brent Wallarab has served as Specialist in Jazz for the Smithsonian Institution in Washington, DC. During this time he has transcribed, edited, and restored nearly 300 works for big band deemed by the Smithsonian as national treasures. Wallarab also performs as lead and solo trombonist for the Smithsonian Jazz Masterworks Orchestra, the ensemble-in-residence of the National Museum of American History, a position he has held since the inception of the orchestra in 1991.

Wallarab is an arranger, composer, teacher, and performer who has toured northern Italy and South Africa, conducting master classes, workshops, and performances.

As an arranger, Wallarab is featured on dozens of recordings and has written for many artists including Wynton Marsalis, the Lincoln Center Jazz Orchestra, Bobby Short, The New York Pops Orchestra, The Chicago Jazz Ensemble, Charlie Haden, Med Flory, Randy Brecker, and Joe Lovano.

In 1994, Wallarab, along with Mark Buselli, founded the Buselli–Wallarab Jazz Orchestra, a professional jazz ensemble based in Indianapolis, Indiana, dedicated to the creation of new works for jazz orchestra and developing programs for jazz education.

Wallarab currently teaches jazz ensemble and jazz arranging at the Jacobs School of Music of Indiana University Bloomington, Indiana.

== Mark Buselli ==
Buselli earned degrees from Berklee College of Music in Boston and Indiana University. Currently he is head of Jazz Studies at Ball State University in Muncie, Indiana. In May 2007, he was awarded the Creative Vision award from NUVO magazine. He was awarded the Dean's Creative Award at Ball State for his 2009 release of An Old Soul by the BWJO that was voted the No. 6 release of 2009 by JAZZIZ magazine. As the Education director for the BWJO Buselli has created programs that have been seen by more than 50,000 students in the mid-west region.

Buselli has over forty arrangements published for big bands, brass ensemble, and piano/ trumpet. He has ten recordings out as a leader on the Owl Studios and OA2 record labels. He has appeared on numerous recordings as a sideman and has performed for presidents Jimmy Carter, George H. Bush, Bill Clinton, and George W. Bush. Mark is a Yamaha artist.

== Discography ==
- Through the Eyes of a Child (Buselli, 1997)
- Happenstance (2001)
- Heart & Soul: The Music of Hoagy Carmichael (Owl, 2003)
- Take the Mitsu (Buselli, 2003)
- Carol of the Bells (Owl, 2007)
- Basically Baker (2007)
- Where or When (Owl, 2008)
- An Old Soul (Owl, 2009)
- Mezzanine (Owl, 2010)
- Untold Stories (Buselli, 2014)
- Basically Baker Vol. 2 (Patois, 2016)
- The Gennett Suite (Patois, 2023)
