= Fareed Haque =

American jazz guitarist

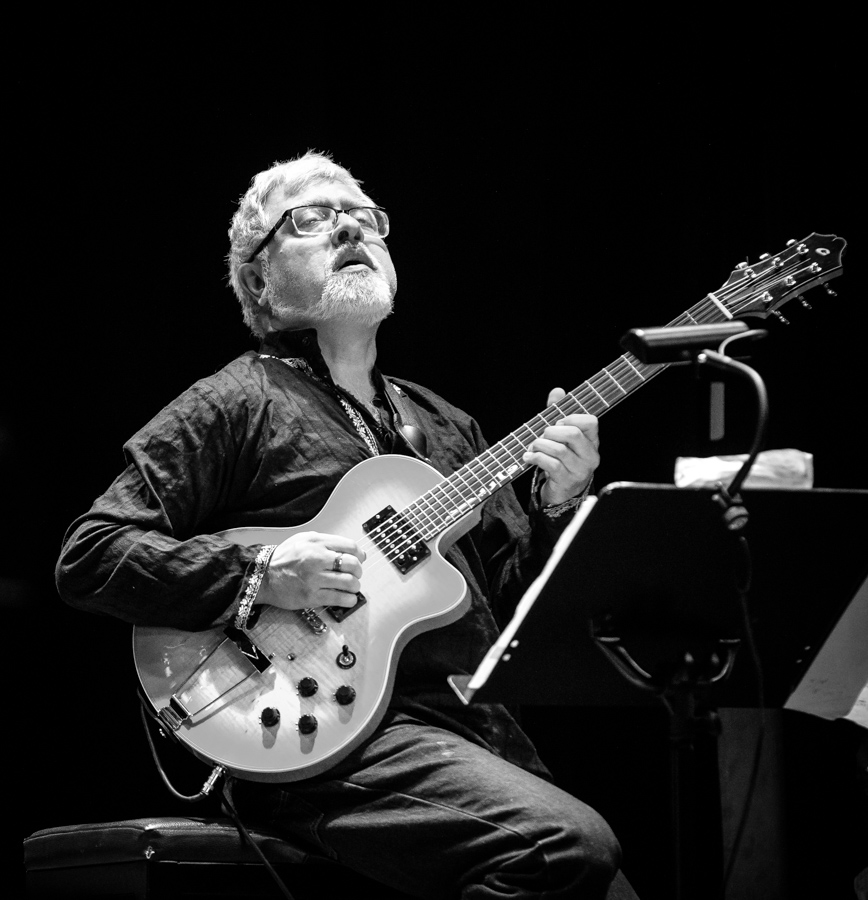
- Haque performing in 2019

Background information
- Born: 1963 (age 62–63); Chicago, Illinois, U.S.
- Genres: Jazz, jazz fusion, classical
- Occupation: Musician
- Instrument: Guitar
- Years active: 1980s–present
- Labels: Pangaea, Warner Bros., Blue Note, Owl
- Website: www.fareed.com

Fareed Haque (born 1963) is an American jazz guitarist, based in Chicago, Illinois.

== Education ==
Haque was born in Chicago in 1963. His father was from Pakistan, his mother was from Chile. When he was a child, Haque traveled with his parents all over the world, spending time in Spain, France, and Iran, in addition to Pakistan and Chile. In 1981 he was given a guitar scholarship from North Texas State University, where he studied jazz guitar. He left after a year and studied classical guitar at Northwestern University. At Northwestern, he joined Howard Levy's jazz fusion group Chevere. Levy introduced him to Cuban saxophonist Paquito D'Rivera, who became a lifelong friend and mentor.

== Early albums ==
In the late 1980s, Rivera introduced Haque to Sting, who had recently founded the record label Pangaea. Haque recorded two albums for Pangaea, Voices Rising and Manresa, and toured with Sting. He recorded Majestad, an unreleased album for Warner Bros. Records which included John Patitucci, Lenny Castro, Russell Ferrante, Michael Landau, and Carlos Vega. Then he signed with Blue Note Records, made the solo albums Sacred Addiction, Opaque, and Deja Vu, and recorded three albums with Javon Jackson. He also played with Joey Calderazzo, Joe Henderson, Bob James, Herbie Mann, and Cassandra Wilson.

== Diverse groups ==
At Northwestern, Haque was a member of Chevere, a Latin fusion group, and on their album Reunion he played with Cuban trumpeter Arturo Sandoval, Panamanian pianist Danilo Pérez, and Puerto Rican percussionist Giovanni Hidalgo. He joined the jazz fusion group Zawinul Syndicate after he was introduced to Joe Zawinul by Bob Belden, a producer at Blue Note Records. The Syndicate included Armenian vocalist Arto Tunçboyacıyan, drummer Paco Sery from the Ivory Coast, and American bassist Matt Garrison. He was a member of the Indian fusion band Summit, led by saxophonist George Brooks and including Indian tabla player Zakir Hussain.

In 2001 Haque founded Garaj Mahal, a jam band that played a combination of jazz, rock, and funk that evolved from the members' diverse musical backgrounds. The band included German bassist Kai Eckhardt. Garaj Mahal toured the U.S. for ten years, releasing several albums. In 2007 it won an Independent Music Award. Two years later Haque was named best world guitarist by Guitar Player.

While recording for Garaj Mahal, Haque discovered the Moog Guitar and electronic music and formed the band MathGames. He started The Flat Earth Ensemble as an exploration of his Indian roots. Because of his parents' heritage, he grew up hearing music from India and Pakistan. He also cites as an influence the band Shakti, led by John McLaughlin, and their album Natural Elements (1977).

Haque recorded with Goran Ivanovic, whose music is sometimes called Balkan jazz. Ivanovic was born in the former Yugoslavia to a Serbian father and Croatian mother, though, like Haque, he is based in Chicago. Haque and Ivanovic played classical guitar on their duets, Macedonian Blues (2003) and Seven Boats (2004).

From 2019 through 2021 and beyond, Fareed Haque and oud player Wanees Zarour restarted the Chicago Immigrant Orchestra, with the encouragement and financial support of the Chicago World Music Festival and the Old Town School of Folk Music. (The orchestra's original incarnation ran from 1999 to 2004, led by Willy Schwartz.) Haque and Zarour recruited other local musicians to join them, and Haque also serves as concertmaster.

== Classical music ==
Haque wrote the "Lahara Double Concerto" for guitar, sitar, and tabla. He performed it in 2004 with the Chicago Sinfonietta and tabla musician Ustad Zakir Hussain. He composed the "Gamelan Concerto" as a commissioned classical guitar piece for Chicago's Fulcrum Point New Music Project. With the Chicago Philharmonic he gave a concert in which he performed guitar concertos by Heitor Villa-Lobos and Aranjuez.

From 1988 to 2019, Haque was a professor of jazz and classical guitar at Northern Illinois University. He also gives interactive guitar lessons over the internet.

== Discography ==
- Voices Rising (Pangaea, 1988)
- Manresa (Pangaea, 1989)
- Sacred Addiction (Blue Note, 1993)
- Opaque (Blue Note, 1995)
- Déjà Vu (Blue Note, 1997)
- Macedonian Blues with Goran Ivanovic (Proteus, 2001)
- Seven Boats: Music for Two Guitars (Proteus, 2004)
- Plays Classical Guitar (Wahdude Music, 2004)
- Cosmic Hug (Magnitude, 2005)
- Flat Planet (Owl, 2008)
- Trance Hypothesis (Delmark, 2013)
- Out of Nowhere with Billy Hart and George Mraz (Charleston Square, 2013)
- New Latin American Music for Guitar and String Quartet with Kaia String Quartet (Delmark, 2018)
- IndoBalkan with Goran Ivanovic (Delmark, 2020)
- Return to the Joyous Lake (Wahdude Music, 2022)
