= Derrick Gardner =

American jazz trumpeter

- Born: Derrick Earl Gardner; June 3, 1965 (age 61); Chicago, Illinois, U.S.
- Genre: Jazz
- Occupations: Musician, composer, arranger
- Instrument: Trumpet
- Years active: 1992–present
- Label: Owl
- Website: www.derrickgardnermusic.com

Derrick Gardner, born on June 3, 1965, is a prominent African-American jazz trumpeter hailing from Chicago, Illinois. He began playing trumpet at the age of 9 in his hometown and through the years, established himself as a talented player and soloist. Throughout his high school and college years at Hampton University in Virginia, he earned a reputation as a creative and skilled improviser. Jazz journalist Ken Franckling notes in the liner notes for the album "A Ride to the Other Side" that Derrick is “a Clifford Brown disciple with tinges of Freddy Hubbard and Woody Shaw thrown in for good measure, all in service of a sound and a band that are extending the funky soul-swing evolution.”

Derrick's musical foundation was influenced by his father, Burgess Gardner, a composer, arranger, educator, and jazz trumpeter who toured with the Ray Charles Big Band in the 1960s. In 1991, Derrick joined the Count Basie Orchestra under the direction of Frank Foster, which led him to relocate to New York City. There, he performed, toured, and recorded with various esteemed groups, including the Count Basie Orchestra, Frank Foster's Loud Minority Band, Harry Connick, Jr.'s Big Band, The Vanguard Jazz Orchestra, The Duke Ellington Orchestra, The Smithsonian Jazz Masterworks Orchestra, the Roy Hargrove Big Band, Mingus Dynasty Big Band, and The Carnegie Hall Big Band, among others.

Throughout his career, Gardner has performed with numerous jazz legends, including the late Dizzy Gillespie, George Benson, Jon Faddis, Nancy Wilson, Barry Harris, Tony Bennett, Joe Williams, Rufus Reid, Clark Terry, Kenny Barron, Stefon Harris, James Moody, Frank Foster, Muhaul Richard Abrams, Benny Golson, Oliver Lake, Nnenna Freelon, Lizz Wright, Tito Puente, Lyle Lovette, Johnny Griffin, and Bobby Short, to name just a few.

As a composer and arranger, Gardner's work has been showcased with renowned ensembles such as The Count Basie Orchestra, The Jazz Heritage Orchestra, The Brad Leali Big Band, and The John Brown Jazz Orchestra, in addition to various colleges and universities around the world.

Since 1989, Derrick has been the driving force behind his own sextet, Derrick Gardner & the Jazz Prophets. Their first album, “Slim Goodie,” was released in 2005 under the Impact Jazz label. In 2008, Gardner partnered with the Indianapolis-based jazz label Owl Studios, producing two albums: “A Ride to the Other Side” in 2008 and “Echoes of Ethnicity” in 2009, the latter of which won the Best Jazz Album award at the 9th Annual Independent Music Awards.

During 2019-2020, Derrick received multiple artist grants from Canada Council for the Arts, FACTOR, the University of Manitoba, and Manitoba Film & Music to produce a big band recording that features his arrangements of ten original compositions. This project, titled “Still I Rise,” by Derrick Gardner & The BIG dig! BAND, was released in July 2020 on the Impact Jazz label and received widespread critical acclaim.

Derrick's fifth album as a leader, “Pan Africa,” by Derrick Gardner & The Jazz Prophets, was launched in January 2023 on the Impact Jazz label. This latest work is inspired by his tour of Ghana and represents a fusion of West African musical traditions and jazz.

In addition to his musical accomplishments, Derrick is a highly regarded educator, clinician, and guest artist at high schools and universities globally. He has served on the jazz faculties of prestigious institutions including The New School, Juilliard School of Music, Long Island University, The Ohio State University, Michigan State University, and the University of Manitoba. Currently, he is Director of Jazz Studies at Northwestern University in Evanston, Illinois.

== Discography ==
Year	Artist	Title	Label
1992	Count Basie Orchestra	Live at El Morocco	Telarc
1992	Count Basie Orchestra	Basie’s Bag	Telarc
1993	Count Basie Orchestra, with Joe Williams	Live at Orchestra Hall, Detroit	Telark
1995	Craig Bailey	A New Journey	Candid
1996	Count Basie Orchestra	Live at Manchester Craftsman's Guild	Jazz MCG
1997	Frank Foster	Leo Rising	Arabesque
2000	George Gee	Swingin' Away	Zort
2000	Talib Kweli & Hi Tek	Reflection Eternal	Priority
2001	Craig Bailey	Brooklyn	Evidence
2001	Carlos Garnett	Moonshadow	Savant
2003	Stefon Harris	The Grand Unification Theory	Blue Note
2003	Lizz Wright	Salt	Verve
2003	Frank Foster	We Do It Diff’rent	Mapleshade
2003	Derrick Gardner & The Jazz Prophets	Slim Goodie	Impact Jazz
2003	Harry Connick, Jr.	Harry for the Holidays	Columbia
2003	Harry Connick, Jr.	Only You	Columbia
2006	Harry Connick, Jr.	Chanson Du Vieux Carre	Columbia
2006	Roman Schaller	The Thurgovian Suite	TCB/Montreux Jazz
2007	Harry Connick, Jr.	Oh, My Nola	Columbia
2007	Brad Leali Jazz Orchestra	Maria Juanez	TCB
2007	Burgess Gardner & The Well-Oiled Jazz Machine	Cabbage Juice	Lamarr Records
2007	Ron Di Salvio	Essence of Green: A Tribute to Kind of Blue	Origin
2008	Zen Zadravec	Coming of Age	Zen Zadravec Music
2008	Roman Schaller	Further Expectations	TCB/Montreux Jazz
2008	Derrick Gardner & The Jazz Prophets	A Ride to the Other Side...	Owl
2009	Derrick Gardner & The Jazz Prophets	Echoes of Ethnicity	Owl
2009	Vincent Gardner Sextet	Three, Five	Steeplechase
2012	Nnenna Freelon & The John Brown Big Band	Christmas	Brown Boulevard
2012	Curtis Knowasad	The Skectic and the Cynic	Know-a-sad Music
2015	Curtis Nowasad	Dialectics	Know-a-sad Music
2019	Zen Zadravec	Human Revolution	Zen Zadravec Music
2020	Derrick Gardner & The Big dig! Band	Still I Rise	Impact Jazz
2023	Derrick Gardner & The Jazz Prophets	Pan Africa	Impact Jazz
2023	Canadian Jazz Collective	Septology	HGBS Blue Records
2023	Clark Sommers	Feast Ephemera	Phrenologymusic
2023	Geof Bradfield	Colosal Abundance	Calligram Records
2024	Canadian Jazz Collective	Live at Le Vauban	Fresh Sound Records
2025	Reginald Lewis	Echoes of Cherry Street	RL Music
