= Steve Allee =

American jazz musician, composer (born 1950)

- Born: September 14, 1950 (age 75); Indianapolis, Indiana, U.S.
- Genres: Jazz
- Occupation: Musician
- Instrument: Piano
- Years active: 1973–current
- Labels: Owl, Motéma, Summit

Steve Allee (born September 14, 1950) is an American jazz musician and composer.

== Life and career ==
Allee attended Ben Davis High School in Indianapolis, Indiana. He was a member of the Baron Von Ohlen Quartet which released a self-titled album in 1973. By age 19, Allee was touring with the Buddy Rich Orchestra. Allee's big band album, Downtown Blues, was nominated for a Grammy Award and featured bassist John Clayton and drummer John Von Ohlen. Allee's first national solo record achieved a position of 14 on the Gavin national radio poll. Allee has worked with Slide Hampton, James Moody, Rufus Reid, Bob Mintzer, Randy Brecker, Phil Woods, Curtis Fuller, Jeff Hamilton, Tim Hagans, John Riley, Ira Sullivan, Ed Thigpen, Eddie Vinson, Milt Hinton, and Bobby Shew.

He received a commission to write a four-movement work for the Indianapolis Symphony Orchestra for the 100th anniversary of the Indianapolis Museum of Art, and composing the score for the film New York in the Fifties, based on a book of the same name by Dan Wakefield. The score was performed live at the Montreux Jazz Festival in Switzerland. Allee composed the soundtrack for Something to Cheer About, the film of the 1954–55 Crispus Attucks basketball team, starring Oscar Robertson. Allee has written music for television shows, including Chicago Hope, Friends, NYPD Blue, Mad About You, Martha Stewart Show, Nash Bridges, Touched by an Angel, and Dharma and Greg. He is the music director for the nationally syndicated radio show The Bob and Tom Show. Allee signed with Indianapolis jazz label Owl Studios in 2006 and released two albums: Colors in 2007 and Dragonfly in 2008.

== Discography ==
- Steve Allee (Green Tree, 1979)
- Mirage (1997)
- Colors (Owl, 2007)
- Dragonfly (Owl, 2008)
- Zebra Stories (2024)
- Naptown Sound (2025)
- Full Circle (2025)
