= Owl Studios =

- Founded: 2005
- Founder: J. Allan Hall
- Genre: Jazz, R&B, jam band
- Country of origin: U.S.
- Location: Indianapolis, Indiana
- Official website: www.owlmusicgroup.com

Owl Studios is a jazz record label founded in Indianapolis, Indiana, in 2005. In 2013, the label was sold and renamed Owl Music Group.

== History ==
=== Founding ===
Owl Studios was started in 2005 by Al Hall, an Indianapolis businessman, to promote local jazz musicians. He grew up playing trumpet in northern California and moved to Indianapolis in 1981. The label began as a basement studio for his sons. Hall said he intended Owl to be run differently from other labels. He said that usually a record label will pay for an album's recording costs, but the musician doesn't see much money until the label has recovered the additional cost of making and promoting the album. His plan was to have the label pay little or nothing in recording fees but immediately share revenue with musicians. He said that this approach gave an incentive for musicians to help promote their work.

Owl's roster includes Indianapolis saxophonist Rob Dixon, jam band Garaj Mahal led by Chicago guitarist Fareed Haque, and a new version of the Headhunters, a jazz fusion band active in 1970s that featured Herbie Hancock; drummer Mike Clark, vocalist Cynthia Layne, trumpeter Derrick Gardner, Indianapolis pianist and composer Steve Allee, clarinetist and saxophonist Frank Glover, the Busselli-Wallarab Jazz Orchestra; Chicago trumpeter Pharez Whitted, and New York City groups Bill Moring & Way Out East, and the Rick Germanson Trio.

=== Other projects ===
In 2009, Owl purchased the rights to the Indy Jazz Fest from the American Piano Awards and took ownership of the annual festival, turning it into a non-profit organization and a way to promote jazz in Indianapolis. The following year Owl started the Emerging Jazz Artist Project to promote new musicians. The first release was the album Blocks (2011) by the Jeff McLaughlin Quartet.

== Owl Music Group ==
In 2013, Owl Studios was sold to Kenny and Valerie Phelps and renamed Owl Music Group. Kenny Phelps is a drummer who toured with Dee Dee Bridgewater from 2012 to 2014.

== Awards and honors ==
- Independent Music Awards, Echoes of Ethnicity by Derrick Gardner & The Jazz Prophets, 2010
- Independent Music Awards nomination, Best Jazz Album, Carnival of Soul by Mike Clark, 2011
- Independent Music Awards nomination, Best Jazz Album, Transient Journey by Pharez Whitted, 2011

== Roster ==
- Bill Moring
- Buselli–Wallarab Jazz Orchestra
- Cynthia Layne
- Derrick Gardner
- Fareed Haque
- Frank Glover
- Garaj Mahal
- Mike Clark
- Monika Herzig
- Pharez Whitted
- Rick Germanson
- Rob Dixon
- Steve Allee
- The Dixon-Rhyne Project
- The Headhunters
- The Twin Cats
- Todd Harrold
