= Kiss Serious =

Studio album by Chico DeBarge
- Released: 1987
- Genre: Minneapolis sound; funk
- Length: 42:16
- Label: Motown
- Producer: Vincent Brantley; Brownmark; Steve Diamond; Skip Drinkwater; Mitch McDowell; Jeff Silverman

Chico DeBarge chronology
Chico DeBarge (1986)	Kiss Serious (1987)	Long Time No See (1997)

Kiss Serious is the second album by American singer Chico DeBarge. It was released by Motown Records in 1987 in the United States.

== Critical reception ==
Professional ratings
Review scores
Source	Rating
AllMusic	1.5/5 stars

AllMusic editor Ed Hogan called the album "a worthy follow-up. With most tracks produced by one-time Prince & the Revolution bassist Brownmark, it's steeped in an '80s-era Minneapolis sound. The funk is poppin' on "I've Been Watching You," "Will You Be Mine," "Don't Move So Fast," and the title track second single."

== Track listing ==
No.	Title	Writer(s)	Producer(s)	Length
1.	"I've Been Watching You"	Brownmark	Brownmark	4:19
2.	"Don't Move So Fast"	Brownmark	Brownmark	3:52
3.	"Will You Be Mine"	Brownmark	Brownmark	3:56
4.	"Kiss Serious"	Mitch McDowell; Rodney Trotter; Craig Owen	McDowell	4:26
5.	"Rainy Nights"	Wayne Douglas, Jr.; Howard Redmond; Tony Black; William Brown III	Skip Drinkwater	4:21
6.	"Love Addiction"	David Zeman; Eddie Chacon	Vincent Brantley; Jeff Carruthers^{[a]}	4:35
7.	"Let's Hook It Up"	Brantley	Brantley; Carruthers^{[a]}	4:27
8.	"After Hours"	David Paul Bryant; Richard Feldman	Drinkwater	5:00
9.	"One-Track Heart"	Jeff Silverman; Steve Diamond	Silverman; Diamond	3:56
10.	"Shame, Shame"	Brownmark; Chico DeBarge; Claude Allen	Brownmark	3:28

Notes

- ^{^a} signifies associate producer(s)

== Charts ==
Chart (1988)	Peak position
US Top R&B/Hip-Hop Albums (Billboard)	63

== Release history ==
Kiss Serious release history
Region	Date	Format	Label	Ref(s)
United States	1987	CD; vinyl	Motown	
