= Slow Traffic to the Right =

Studio album by Bennie Maupin
- Released: 1977
- Recorded: 1976–1977
- Studios: Different Fur; San Francisco
- Genre: Jazz-fusion
- Length: 32:15
- Label: Mercury
- Producer: Pat Gleeson

Bennie Maupin chronology
The Jewel in the Lotus (1974)	Slow Traffic to the Right (1977)	Moonscapes (1978)

Professional ratings
Review scores
Source	Rating
Allmusic	4/5 stars
The Rolling Stone Jazz Record Guide	3/5 stars

Slow Traffic to the Right is the second album by jazz woodwind player Bennie Maupin, released in 1977.

== Track listing ==
1. "It Remains to Be Seen" – 8:01
2. "Eternal Flame" – 4:34
3. "Water Torture" – 4:52
4. "You Know The Deal" (June Monteiro, Kevin Eggel Jackson) - 7:03
5. "Lament" (Onaje Allan Gumbs) - 1:52
6. "Quasar" - 5:53

All compositions by Bennie Maupin except where noted

== Personnel ==
- Bennie Maupin - soprano saxophone, tenor saxophone, saxello, piccolo, flute, alto flute, bass clarinet, Oberheim Polyphonic Synthesizer, background vocals
- Patrice Rushen - acoustic piano, Rhodes piano, clavinet
- Onaje Allan Gumbs - piano (on 5)
- Ralph Armstrong - G3 Gibson bass (except 1,2)
- Paul Jackson - custom bass (on 1,2)
- James Levi - drums
- Blackbird McKnight - electric guitar
- Eddie Henderson - trumpet, flugelhorn
- Craig Kilby - trombone
- Nathan Rubin - concert master, strings
- Pat Gleeson - Oberheim and E-Mu Polyphonic synthesizer
