= Michael Stephans =

American jazz drummer (born 1945)

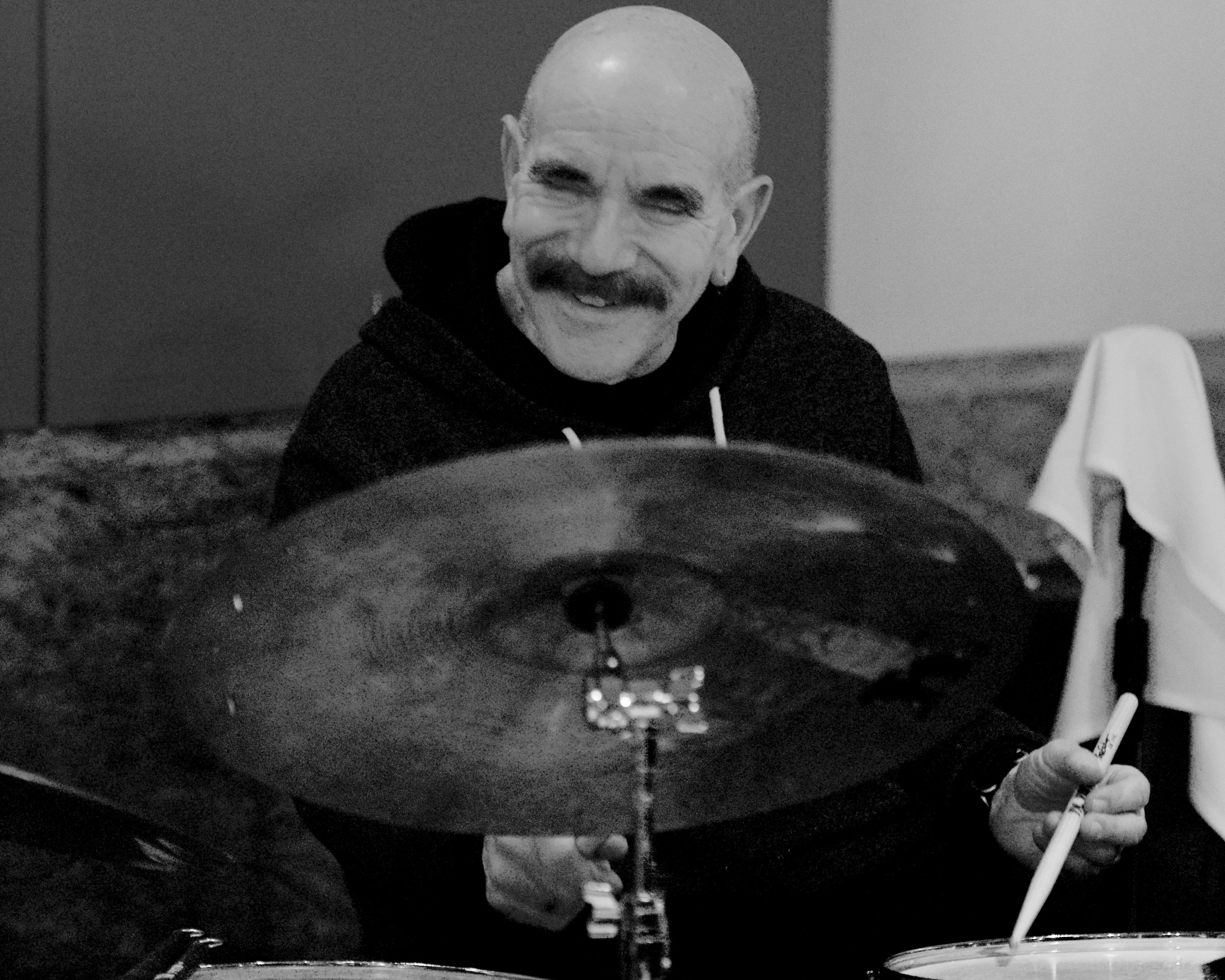

Background information
- Born: June 9, 1945 (age 81); Miami, Florida, U.S.
- Genres: Jazz, avant-garde jazz
- Occupations: Musician, author, poet, educator
- Instruments: Drums, percussion
- Years active: 1970s–present
- Labels: Challenge, iTi, itm, Endemik, Lunazure, Whaling City Sound, Cryptogramophone Sunnyside Records, Origin Records

Michael Stephans (born June 9, 1945) is an American jazz drummer, writer, poet and college professor.

== Biography and career ==
As a jazz drummer, Stephans has performed and recorded with artists including Dave Liebman, Bennie Maupin, Joe Lovano, Bob Brookmeyer, Don Menza, and Alan Broadbent.

Stephans' first solo recording, Om ShalOM, was critically lauded in 2007 by UK critic Tom Barlow as an album of the year in the December 2007 – January 2008 issue of Jazzwise.

Stephans has received multiple composition grants from the National Endowment for the Arts. In 1974, this association afforded him the opportunity to write the large ensemble composition "Shapes and Visions" for vibraphonist Karl Berger, which was performed at the Smithsonian Museum of Natural History in Washington, D.C.

His poetry has been published in The Note, and Inscape. In 2000, he was given the Rachael Sherwood Poetry Prize by the department of English at Cal State Northridge. He is the author of Experiencing Jazz: A Listener's Companion, published in 2013 by Scarecrow Press. and Experiencing Ornette Coleman: A Listener's Companion, published in 2017 by Rowman & Littlefield Publishers.

He has taught at Pasadena City College, the University of Miami, and Bloomsburg University of Pennsylvania.

== Discography ==
=== As leader ===
Year	Album	Personnel	Label
2007	Om / ShalOM	Dave Liebman, Bennie Maupin, Munyungo Jackson, Scott Colley, Michael Stephans	Endemik
2010	Open Spaces	Zack Brock, Jim Ridl, Steve Varner, Michael Stephans	Lunazure
2018	Quartette Oblique	Michael Stephans, Dave Liebman, Marc Copland, Drew Gress	Sunnyside

=== As a co-leader ===
Year	Album	Personnel	Label
1984	Heads Up!	Bob Ojeda, Bob Sheppard, John Patitucci, Michael Stephans	iTi
2003	Stay Out of the Sun	Bob Brookmeyer, Michael Stephans, Tom Warrington, Larry Koonse	Challenge
2009	Nomads	David Liebman, Michael Stephans	ITM/Jazzwerkstatt
2013	Lineage	Dave Liebman, Michael Stephans, Vic Juris, Matt Vashlishan, Bobby Avey, Evan Gregor	Whaling City Sound

=== As sideman ===
With Bob Brookmeyer

- Oslo (Concord Jazz, 1987)
- Stay Out of the Sun (Challenge Records, 2003)

With Bob Dorough

- P Is for the People (DeesBees, 2012)

With Bennie Maupin

- Penumbra (Cryptogramophone, 2006)

With Matt Vashlishan

- No Such Thing (Origin Records, 2009)

With Don Menza

• Menza Lines (Jazzed Media, 2005)

With Larry Gelb

- The Love Song of Ian Opps (IAM Records, 2013)

With Frank Strazzeri Trio & Quartet

- Frank's Blues (Night Life, 1992)

With Julie Andrews

- Love, Julie (USA Music Group, 1987)

With Jack Jones

- I Am a Singer (USA Music Group, 1987)

With Bo Lozoff

- Eyes So Soft (Rockin' Monkey, 2006)

== Bibliography ==
=== Works ===
Title	Publication date	Pages	Publisher
Experiencing Jazz: A Listener’s Companion	October 17, 2013	502	Scarecrow Press
Brookmeyer and Me: An Odyssey of Friendship	2014	5	The Note, V. 24, No. 1, 2014
Experiencing Ornette Coleman: A Listener's Companion	October 6, 2017	213	Rowman & Littlefield Publishers
