= Mwandishi =

Studio album by Herbie Hancock
- Released: March 1971
- Recorded: January 1971
- Studio: Wally Heider (San Francisco)
- Genres: Jazz fusion, avant-garde jazz
- Length: 44:48
- Label: Warner Bros.
- Producer: David Rubinson

Herbie Hancock chronology
Fat Albert Rotunda (1969)	Mwandishi (1971)	Crossings (1972)

Professional ratings
Review scores
Source	Rating
AllMusic	5/5 stars
The Rolling Stone Jazz Record Guide	3/5 stars
The Penguin Guide to Jazz Recordings	3/4 stars

Mwandishi is the ninth studio album by American jazz pianist Herbie Hancock, released in March 1971. It is the first album to officially feature Hancock’s ‘Mwandishi’ sextet, consisting of reed player Bennie Maupin, trumpeter Eddie Henderson, trombonist Julian Priester, bassist Buster Williams, and drummer Billy Hart.

== Background ==
This album is one of Hancock's first departures from the traditional idioms of jazz, as well as the beginning of an original and creative style which eventually appealed to a wider audience. In addition, Mwandishi was Hancock's attempt at continuing the musical principles and styles he explored in his previous experiences with Miles Davis (on the album In A Silent Way, for instance). Hancock's previous explorations of jazz fusion included Fat Albert Rotunda, an album related to the TV special ‘’Hey, Hey, Hey, It's Fat Albert’’.

Mwandishi was recorded at Wally Heider Studios Studio C, San Francisco, in January 1971. The recording incorporated progressive notions of funk, jazz, and rock.

The tracks on Mwandishi include "Ostinato," the time signature of which is 15/8, "You'll Know When You Get There," and "Wandering Spirit Song." "Wandering Spirit Song" features Hancock's extensive use of tension and release, in which he builds the tension of the song by crescendos and an increasing number of musical voices, and then releases the tension with long held chords on his synthesizer.

Mwandishi ("composer") is the Swahili name Hancock adopted during the late 1960s and early 1970s. The members of the Sextet each adopted a Swahili name: Mchezaji ("player," someone who plays a game) for Buster Williams, Jabali ("strong as a rock") for Billy Hart, Mganga ("doctor," whose traditional functions include exorcism, prophecy, and the removal of spells) for Eddie Henderson, Mwile ("body", from Swahili mwili) for Bennie Maupin, Pepo Mtoto ("demon baby") for Julian Priester, and Ndugu ("brother") for Leon Chancler.

== Release history ==
Mwandishi, along with Fat Albert Rotunda and Crossings, was reissued in one set as Mwandishi: The Complete Warner Bros. Recordings in 1994 and as The Warner Bros. Years (1969-1972) in 2014.

== Track listing ==
All songs composed by Herbie Hancock except where noted.

Side A
No.	Title	Length
1.	"Ostinato (Suite for Angela)"	13:10
2.	"You'll Know When You Get There"	10:22
Total length:		23:32

Side B
No.	Title	Writer(s)	Length
3.	"Wandering Spirit Song"	Julian Priester	21:26
Total length:			21:26

== Personnel ==
- Mwandishi / Herbie Hancock – Fender Rhodes electric piano
- Mchezaji / Buster Williams – bass guitar, double bass
- Jabali / Billy Hart – drums
- Mganga / Eddie Henderson – trumpet, flugelhorn
- Mwile / Bennie Maupin – bass clarinet, alto flute, piccolo
- Pepo Mtoto / Julian Priester– tenor trombone, bass trombone

with

- Leon "Ndugu" Chancler – drums and percussion on "Ostinato (Suite for Angela)"
- José "Chepito" Areas – congas and timbales on "Ostinato (Suite for Angela)"
- Ronnie Montrose – electric guitar on "Ostinato (Suite for Angela)"
