= Like a Dream =

Like a Dream may refer to:

- Like a Dream (album), by Darek Oleszkiewicz
- "Like a Dream", an episode of Planetes
