= Moonscapes =

Studio album by Bennie Maupin
- Released: 1978
- Studios: Conway Recording Studios; Hollywood, CA
- Genre: Jazz-fusion
- Length: 37:01
- Label: Mercury
- Producer: Pat Gleeson

Bennie Maupin chronology
Slow Traffic to the Right (1977)	Moonscapes (1978)	Driving While Black (1998)

Professional ratings
Review scores
Source	Rating
AllMusic	3/5 stars
Jazzwise	4/5 stars

Moonscapes is the third studio album by jazz woodwind player Bennie Maupin, released in 1978. The eight-track record includes contributions by Bobby Lyle, Graham Preskett, Onaje Allen Gumbs, and others.

== Track listing ==
All compositions by Bennie Maupin except where noted

1. "Nightwatch" – 06:10
2. "Farewell to Rahsaan" – 03:35
3. "Anua" – 06:49
4. "A Promise Kept" – 05:47
5. "Just Give It Some Time" – 04:46
6. "Sansho Shima" – 04:24
7. "Crystals" – 01:18
8. "Baker Street" (Graham Preskett) – 04:03

== Personnel ==
- Bennie Maupin – soprano and tenor saxophones, bass clarinet, flute, Eu synthesizer and computing synthesizer winddriver, bass marimba, glockenspiel
- Bobby Lyle – acoustic and electric piano, clavinet (courtesy Capitol Records)
- Harvey Mason – drums
- Mike Sembello – acoustic and electric guitar
- Abraham La Boriel – bass
- Mingo Lewis – congas and miscellaneous percussion
- Onaje Allen Gumbs – electric piano ("Just Give It Some Time," "Sansho Shima")
- Beverly Bellows – harp ("Farewell to Rahsaan")
- Patrick Gleeson – synthesizer programming
- Derrick Youman – vocal colors on "A Promise Kept"
