= Nolan Shaheed =

American jazz musician

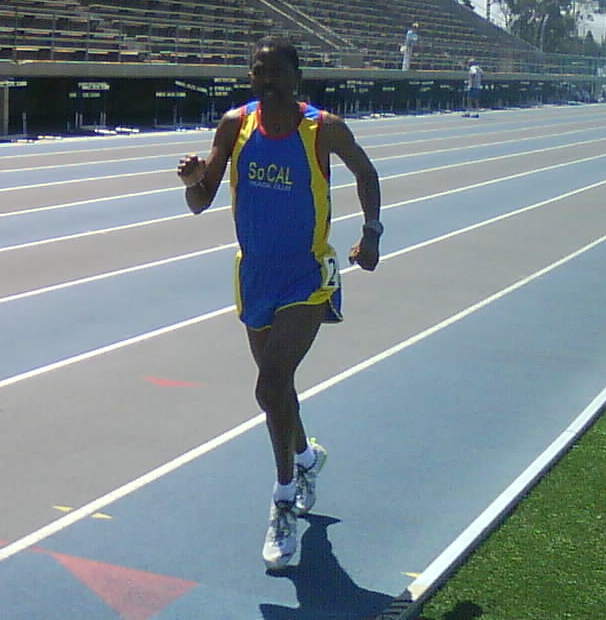
Nolan Shaheed while setting the M60 1500 metres in the Southern California Striders "Meet of Champions" at Cerritos College in Norwalk, California

Nolan Shaheed (born Nolan Andrew Smith, Jr.; July 18, 1949 in Pasadena, California) is an American jazz musician, specializing in the cornet and trumpet, and a world record holding masters athlete.

== Masters athletics ==
Shaheed has been in the masters world rankings over various middle-distance races since he turned 40. He was the second 50-year-old to break the 2 minute barrier in the 800 metres where he holds the current world record. He added the M50 world record in the Mile run and since turning 60 has added the world record in the 800 metres and 1500 metres. Indoors he holds the world records in the mile in all age divisions between M50 and M60, plus was part of the M50 4x800 m relay team. Domestically he has added the indoor M55 and M60 1500m records and M50, M55, M60 records in the 3000 meters.

== Discography ==
=== As sideman ===
- Miles Davis and Michel Legrand, Dingo (Warner Bros., 1991)
- Eddie Harris, Dancing By A Rainbow (Enja, 1996)
- Buddy Collette, In Concert (Bridge, 2000)
- Earth, Wind & Fire, Illumination (Sanctuary Urban 2004)
- Henry Franklin, The Soul of the World (S.P. 2011)
- John Heard, The Jazz Composer's Song Book (Straight Ahead, 2005)
- Karizma, Perfect Harmony (Creatchy, 2012)
- Gretchen Lieberum, Brand New Morning (Lakeshore, 2002)
- Carmen Lundy, Changes (Afrasia, 2012)
- Barbara Morrison, Visit Me (Chartmaker, 1999)
- Sweet Baby J'ai, Evolution (Sunset, 2002)
- Vinx, The Mood I'm In (Peermusic, 2002)
- Aga Zaryan, Picking Up the Pieces (Polskie Radio, 2006)
- Adam Czerwiński & Darek Oleszkiewicz, Raindance (AC Records 2006)
