= Sunburst (Eddie Henderson album) =

Studio album by Eddie Henderson
- Released: 1975
- Recorded: March & April, 1975
- Studios: Wally Heider, San Francisco, California
- Genre: Jazz-funk
- Length: 37:32
- Label: Blue Note BNLA 464
- Producer: Skip Drinkwater

Eddie Henderson chronology
Inside Out (1973)	Sunburst (1975)	Heritage (1976)

Sunburst is an album by American jazz trumpeter Eddie Henderson recorded in 1975 and released on the Blue Note label.

== Reception ==
The AllMusic review by Richard S. Ginell stated, "Switching over to Blue Note, which was then reaping a fortune with Donald Byrd's R&B outfit, Eddie Henderson pursued a harder, earthier, more structured, funk-driven sound on his first album, while maintaining some of his marvelously spacier instincts for spice".

Professional ratings
Review scores
Source	Rating
AllMusic	4/5 stars
The Penguin Guide to Jazz Recordings	3.5/4 stars
The Rolling Stone Jazz Record Guide	3/5 stars

== Track listing ==
All compositions by Eddie Henderson except as indicated

1. "Explodition" (George Duke) - 6:41
2. "The Kumquat Kids" (Alphonso Johnson) - 4:30
3. "Sunburst" - 5:49
4. "Involuntary Bliss" (Alphonso Johnson) - 6:52
5. "Hop Scotch" (Harvey Mason) - 3:53
6. "Galaxy" - 6:36
7. "We End in a Dream" (Bennie Maupin) - 3:11

- Recorded at Wally Heider Sound Studios in San Francisco, California, in April & May, 1975.

== Personnel ==
- Eddie Henderson – trumpet, flugelhorn, cornet
- Julian Priester – trombone
- Bennie Maupin – tenor saxophone, bass clarinet, saxello
- Bobby Hutcherson – marimba (track 6)
- George Duke – electric piano, clavinet, synthesizer
- Buster Williams – bass (track 7)
- Alphonso Johnson – electric bass (tracks 1–6)
- Harvey Mason (tracks 1–6), Billy Hart (track 7) – drums
