= Symphonic Tone Poem for Brother Yusef =

Studio album by Bennie Maupin and Adam Rudolph
- Released: 2022
- Studios: Clear Lake Studio, New Jersey
- Genre: Jazz
- Length: 41:20
- Labels: Strut; STRUT298LP
- Producer: Adam Rudolph

Bennie Maupin chronology
Early Reflections (2008)	Symphonic Tone Poem for Brother Yusef (2022)

Symphonic Tone Poem for Brother Yusef is an album by multi-instrumentalist Bennie Maupin and percussionist Adam Rudolph. It was recorded at Clear Lake Studio in New Jersey, and was released in 2022 by Strut Records. The album pays homage to Yusef Lateef, who would have been 100 years old in 2020, and who had a personal connection with both musicians.

The recording came about following a commission from the Angel City Jazz Festival, based in Claremont, California. The cover art, by Nancy Jackson, is a response to Lateef's statement "Have you noticed the leaves waving to you? It's okay to wave back."

== Reception ==
Professional ratings
Review scores
Source	Rating
AllMusic	4/5 stars
DownBeat	4/5 stars
All About Jazz	3.5/5 stars
Jazzwise	4/5 stars
Jazz Trail	4/5 stars

In a review for AllMusic, Thom Jurek wrote: "While certainly composed in places, there is abundant room for instinctual improvisation. The approach is both organic and disciplined; the music is at once meditative, eerie, and arresting... Symphonic Tone Poem for Brother Yusef is... a single, flowing, contemplative work that pays excellent tribute to Lateef's musical example, inspiration, and legacy."

DownBeat's Joshua Myers called the album "a fitting tribute" to Lateef, and stated: "This complex palette offers space for an expressive engagement with intuition, moving where one is lead. It is improvisation but it also feels much like there is a direction."

Chris May of All About Jazz commented: "what we hear are beautifully recorded, unmediated acoustic sounds, multi-layered and maybe with some loops. Quietly virtuosic, the music's most important attribute is its restorative quality."

Writing for Jazzwise, Kevin Le Gendre remarked: "The breadth of experience Maupin and Rudolph have acquired... shows in all their judicious subtleties as well as vivid flourish, and the result is music that has the gravitas and solemnity that are entirely apt for a subject like the once in a lifetime Brother Yusef."

In an article for The New York City Jazz Record, Andrey Henkin wrote: "Maupin and Rudolph operate in a restrained, almost minimalistic approach, sedate on the surface like a still pond but teeming with life just below, as various instruments dart and float through one another. The individual sections are not extricable, the complexity growing as more attention is paid, details requiring a new skill: peripheral hearing. Those listeners with patience will be greatly rewarded."

Filipe Freitas of Jazz Trail stated: "This gifted duo never overcooks, finding the perfect formula to shine, with no need of frills and shocks to provide a wonderful experience for the listener. This is a gracefully executed work where their purity of vision and sense of modernity are going strong."

UK Vibe's Imran Mirza described the album as "a stunning tribute" to Lateef, and commented: "With the tracks veering between ambient and ethereal, the at times lengthy movements are subtle master classes in Rudolph's venerated percussive abilities with Maupin accentuating each piece with indelible textures that draw you further into each track."

Writing for The Stranger, Dave Segal noted: "Each of the pieces could conceivably go on forever... But it is this very tranquil fortitude that lends Brother Yusef its charm. Every cut throws you into a mysterious environment with seemingly no way out, and you gladly dwell in their unknown zones for the sheer unusualness of them."

== Track listing ==
Composed by Adam Rudolph and Bennie Maupin.

1. "First Movement" – 8:53
2. "Second Movement" – 6:49
3. "Third Movement (Part 1)" – 5:52
4. "Third Movement (Part 2)" – 3:22
5. "Fourth Movement" – 8:58
6. "Fifth Movement" – 7:33

== Personnel ==
- Bennie Maupin – bass clarinet, soprano saxophone, voice, flute, alto flute
- Adam Rudolph – keyboards, drum machine, slit drum, glockenspiel, voice, thumb piano, marimbula, gong bells, percussion
