= Skip Drinkwater =

American record producer

Skip Drinkwater is an American record producer. He is best known for working with jazz artists, Norman Connors, Alphonse Mouzon and Eddie Henderson, as well as discovering the Catalyst and working with the all black heavy metal band Sound Barrier.

== Production Discography ==
- Catalyst – Catalyst 1972
- Neptune – The Visitors 1972
- Dance Of Magic – Norman Connors 1972
- Realization – Eddie Henderson 1973
- Dark Of Light – Norman Connors 1973
- First Time Out – James Montgomery Band 1973
- Monkey In A Silk Suit Is Still A Monkey – Duke Williams And The Extremes 1973
- Inside Out – Eddie Henderson 1974
- Love From The Sun – Norman Connors 1974
- Slewfoot – Norman Connors 1974
- Sunburst – Eddie Henderson 1975
- Saturday Night Special – Norman Connors 1975
- Mind Transplant – Alphonse Mouzon 1975
- Level One – The Eleventh House featuring Larry Coryell 1975
- Mango Surprise – John Lee & Gerry Brown 1975
- Heritage – Eddie Henderson 1976
- Yesterday's Dreams – Alphonso Johnson 1976
- You Are My Starship – Norman Connors 1976
- The Man Incognito – Alphonse Mouzon 1976
- A Tear And A Smile – Catalyst 1976
- Anticipation – Willie Tee 1976
- First Course – Lee Ritenour 1976
- Still Can't Say Enough – John Lee & Gerry Brown 1976
- Comin' Through – Eddie Henderson 1977
- Romantic Journey – Norman Connors 1977
- Captain Fingers – Lee Ritenour 1977
- Mahal – Eddie Henderson 1977
- René & Angela – René & Angela 1979
- Runnin' To Your Love – Eddie Henderson 1979
- Total Control (album) – Sound Barrier 1983
- Chico DeBarge – Chico DeBarge 1986
- Skin on Skin – Vanity 1986
- All for Love – Princess 1987
