= The Jewel in the Lotus (album) =

Studio album by Bennie Maupin
- Released: 1974
- Recorded: March 1974
- Studios: Record Plant; New York City
- Genres: Jazz-fusion; avant-garde jazz; modal jazz
- Length: 44:17
- Label: ECM 1043 ST
- Producer: Manfred Eicher

Bennie Maupin chronology
The Jewel in the Lotus (1974)	Slow Traffic to the Right (1977)

The Jewel in the Lotus is the debut album by jazz woodwind player Bennie Maupin, recorded in March 1974 and released on ECM later that year. The sextet's rhythm section consists of pianist Herbie Hancock, bassist Buster Williams and percussionists Billy Hart, Freddie Waits and Bill Summers, with guest appearances from trumpeter Charles Sullivan. The title is a translation of the Buddhist mantra Oṃ maṇi padme hūṃ (Devanagari: ॐ मणि पद्मे हूँ).

== Background ==
In 2011, Ricardo Villalobos and Max Loderbauer used samples of The Jewel in the Lotus as the basis for the track "Rensenada" on the remix album Re:ECM.

== Reception ==
Professional ratings
Review scores
Source	Rating
AllMusic	5/5 stars
Pitchfork	9.1/10
The Rolling Stone Jazz Record Guide	4/5 stars
The Penguin Guide to Jazz Recordings	3.5/4 stars
The Guardian	4/5 stars
All About Jazz	5/5 stars
DownBeat	4/5 stars

The editors of AllMusic awarded the album a full five stars. Thom Jurek called it "a true jazz classic," and wrote: "The true worth of Jewel in the Lotus is that perhaps no other bandleader at the time could bring together players from such different backgrounds and relationships to his own musical development and make them interact with one another with material that is scored so closely and whose dynamics and tensions are so pronounced and steady... This album sounds as timeless and adventurous in the present as the day it was released."

The authors of The Penguin Guide to Jazz Recordings described the album as "a record that steals into the room and leaves again without introductions, but without attempting to be pointlessly enigmatic."

In a review for Pitchfork, Shuja Haider stated: "Though Bennie Maupin is listed as the leader, The Jewel in the Lotus defies assumptions about the hierarchy of musical composition and performance... Even when an individual speaks alone, it suggests, the collective listens together, and there is no higher calling than accompanying others."

The Guardian's John Fordham commented: "The rich soundscapes of Bitches Brew and early Weather Report are strong references, with Maupin far more of an enabler and a colourist than a flat-out soloist. But his rich tapestries are more acoustic than most early 1970s fusion... and this is an absorbing collage of long flute sounds over marimba vamps and loosely impressionistic percussion, water-churning noises and electric keys washing around brooding bass clarinet lines, airy soprano melodies over Buster Williams' bowed bass."

John Kelman, writing for All About Jazz, called the album "a masterpiece," and remarked: "Maupin's writing is often marked by richly distinctive lyricism, but it's the ongoing interplay of this sextet/septet that makes the album so remarkable. Like the attention to space paid by the three percussionists, there's a gossamer-like ethereality to these extraordinarily multi-directional conversations."

Brian Payne of Jazz Journal wrote: "This is a strange and at times haunting album. It's invariably wistful and is a classic example of 1970s spiritual jazz."

Alan Heineman of DownBeat gave the album 4 stars and concluded his review: "When it began, jazz was a music of collective improvisation. For almost half a century, it moved inexorably toward becoming a soloist's act. The impact of Coleman, Taylor, Coltrane, et al., has partly consisted in returning black music to its original collective state. In the early days of "free" jazz, this resulted in painful, even destructive, chaos, but over the past few years we've had many occasions to be grateful for the new collectivist spirit. This album is one such occasion."

== Track listing ==
All compositions by Bennie Maupin

1. "Ensenada" – 8:15
2. "Mappo" – 8:30
3. "Excursion" – 4:52
4. "Past + Present = Future" – 1:52
5. "The Jewel in the Lotus" – 10:02
6. "Winds of Change" – 1:30
7. "Song for Tracie Dixon Summers" – 5:19
8. "Past Is Past" – 3:57

== Personnel ==
- Bennie Maupin – saxophones, flute, bass clarinet, voice, glockenspiel
- Herbie Hancock – acoustic and electric pianos
- Buster Williams – bass
- Billy Hart – drums (right channel)
- Freddie Waits – drums, marimba (left channel)
- Bill Summers – percussion
- Charles Sullivan – trumpet on "Mappo" and "Excursion"
