= Sextant (album) =

Studio album by Herbie Hancock
- Released: March 30, 1973
- Recorded: early 1973
- Studios: Wally Heider Studios and Different Fur, San Francisco
- Genres: Jazz fusion; avant-funk; jazz-rock
- Length: 39:02
- Label: Columbia
- Producer: David Rubinson

Herbie Hancock chronology
Crossings (1972)	Sextant (1973)	Head Hunters (1973)

Professional ratings
Review scores
Source	Rating
Allmusic	4/5 stars
Rolling Stone 1998	4/5 stars
Rolling Stone 2004	5/5 stars
Uppity Music	(favorable)
Virgin Encyclopedia	4/5 stars
Penguin Guide to Jazz	3/4 stars
The Rolling Stone Jazz Record Guide	3/5 stars

Sextant is the eleventh studio album by American jazz pianist Herbie Hancock, released on March 30, 1973, by Columbia Records. It was Hancock's first album on Columbia, and his final album with the "Mwandishi" sextet featuring woodwind player Bennie Maupin, trumpeter Eddie Henderson, trombonist Julian Priester, bassist Buster Williams, and drummer Billy Hart. Synthesizer player Patrick Gleeson and percussionist Buck Clarke also appear.

The album showcased Hancock's early adoption of synthesizers and electronic effects. Upon release, the record was considered to be a commercial flop, and Hancock subsequently formed a new band, the Headhunters, with only Maupin continuing on from the "Mwandishi" band.

== Critical reception ==
AllMusic called the album a "gem" which features "a kind of post-modal, free impressionism that traces the edges of funk." Rolling Stone wrote that, "taking his cue from [Miles] Davis' swirling, anarchic Bitches Brew and On the Corner, Hancock went even further into outer space [...] much of Sextant, with its twittering, burbling effects, amounts to a primitive version of Nineties ambient music." The album was called an "uncompromising avant-funk masterpiece" by Paste in a retrospective review.

== Track listing ==
All tracks are written by Herbie Hancock.

Side one
No.	Title	Length
1.	"Rain Dance"	9:16
2.	"Hidden Shadows"	10:11
Total length:		19:27

Side two
No.	Title	Length
1.	"Hornets"	19:35
Total length:		19:35

== Personnel ==
- Mwandishi (Herbie Hancock) – piano, Rhodes piano, Clavinet, Mellotron, ARP 2600 synthesizer, ARP Pro Soloist synthesizer, Moog synthesizer, percussion
- Mwile (Bennie Maupin) – soprano saxophone, bass clarinet, piccolo, afuche, "hum-a-zoo"
- Mganga (Eddie Henderson) – trumpet, flugelhorn
- Pepo (Julian Priester) – trombone, bass trombone, alto trombone, cowbell
- Mchezaji (Buster Williams) – bass guitar, double bass
- Jabali (Billy Hart) – drums
- Patrick Gleeson – ARP 2600, ARP Pro Soloist
- Buck Clarke – percussion
- FUNDI – "Random Resonator"
