= A Book of Luminous Things =

Studio album by Aga Zaryan
- Released: June 14, 2011
- Recorded: March–April 2011
- Studios: Castle Oaks Studios, Calabasas
- Genre: Jazz
- Length: 50:49
- Language: English
- Label: EMI Music Poland/Blue Note

Aga Zaryan chronology
Looking Walking Being (2010)	A Book of Luminous Things (2011)

A Book of Luminous Things is the fifth studio album by the Polish jazz singer Aga Zaryan. It was released on June 14, 2011 by EMI Music Poland and Blue Note Records.

The album contains twelve compositions to the poems of Czesław Miłosz and his favourite poets: Anna Świrszczyńska, Jane Hirshfield and Denise Levertov. In October, 2011 EMI Music Poland published another version of the album, called Księga olśnień (which is the Polish translation of A Book of Luminous Things) with the same songs being performed in Polish. Apart from the language, the only difference between the two versions is in the song This Only (Polish: To jedno), which in the English version is performed by Aga Zaryan as sole vocalist, while in the Polish version she was joined by Grzegorz Turnau.

Recorded at Castle Oaks Studios in Calabasas, California in spring 2011.

== Track listing ==
No.	Title	Lyrics	Composition	Length
1.	"Music Like Water"	Jane Hiershfield	Michał Tokaj	5:11
2.	"Like a He-Bear and She-Bear/ Falling Asleep/ Sleepy Eyelashes"	Anna Świrszczyńska	Michał Tokaj	4:39
3.	"This Only"	Czesław Miłosz	Michał Tokaj	3:44
4.	"Eye Mask"	Denise Levertov	Michał Tokaj	2:34
5.	"Autumn Quince"	Jane Hiershfield	Michał Tokaj	5:48
6.	"Meaning"	Czesław Miłosz	Michał Tokaj	3:16
7.	"A Gift"	Denise Levertov	Aga Zaryan, Michał Tokaj	3:42
8.	"A Parable of the Poppy"	Czesław Miłosz	Aga Zaryan, Michał Tokaj	4:20
9.	"I Talk to My Body"	Anna Świrszczyńska	Aga Zaryan, Michał Tokaj	4:06
10.	"A Song on the End of the World"	Czesław Miłosz	Michał Tokaj	4:54
11.	"On Prayer"	Czesław Miłosz	Michał Tokaj	4:30
12.	"This World"	Czesław Miłosz	David Dorůžka	4:05

== Personnel ==
- Aga Zaryan – vocals
- Michał Tokaj – piano
- Larry Koonse – guitar
- Darek Oleszkiewicz – double bass
- Munyungo Jackson – percussion

== Certifications ==
Region	Certification	Certified units/sales
Poland (ZPAV)	Platinum	20,000^{*}
^{*} Sales figures based on certification alone.
