= Addiction (Chico DeBarge album) =

Studio album by Chico DeBarge
- Released: July 14, 2009
- Genre: R&B
- Length: 47:22
- Label: Kedar
- Producers: Chico DeBarge; Joe Thomas; Lylit

Chico DeBarge chronology
Free (2003)	Addiction (2009)

Addiction is the sixth studio album by American R&B singer Chico DeBarge. It was released by Kedar Entertainment on July 14, 2009. DeBarge's first album in six years, it debuted and peaked at number 93 on the US Billboard 200 and number 11 on the Top R&B/Hip-Hop Albums chart.

== Critical reception ==
Professional ratings
Review scores
Source	Rating
About.com	3/5 stars
AllMusic	3/5 stars
PopMatters	8/10

AllMusic editor Andy Kellman rated the album three out of five stars and wrote "DeBarge's attempts at staying up with performers half his age – that is, in terms of lyrical salaciousness and references to Patrón – tend not to be pulled off so well. Nevertheless, this set should please the followers who were a little put off by the haziness of 2003's (actually pretty great) Free." Tyler Lewis from PopMatters called the album the "strongest contemporary soul record of the year so far (along with Maxwell's BLACKsummers'night) and a beautiful re-introduction to a major, unsung talent." He remarked that "if there is any problem with the album, it is that a handful of songs just sound pretty run-of-the-mill next to the other songs I've referenced. Though they aren't necessarily bad songs, they are aggressively average enough to keep Addiction from being the masterpiece it clearly could have been."

== Track listing ==
No.	Title	Writer(s)	Producer(s)	Length
1.	"Addiction Meeting (Interlude)"	Chico DeBarge	Kedar Massenburg	0:31
2.	"Nefertiti"/"Center of the Universe"	DeBarge; James Henderson	DeBarge	2:13
3.	"Oh No"	DeBarge; Anthony Best; Joe Thomas	DeBarge; Joe	4:07
4.	"Tell Ur Man"	DeBarge; Henderson	DeBarge	3:26
5.	"Math" (featuring Talib Kweli)	DeBarge; Talib Greene	DeBarge	3:49
6.	"Do My Bad Alone"	DeBarge	DeBarge	3:06
7.	"Slick (Addiction)"	DeBarge	DeBarge	4:22
8.	"I'm Okay"	DeBarge	DeBarge	3:27
9.	"Medication (Interlude)"	DeBarge	DeBarge	2:15
10.	"She Love Me"	DeBarge; Henderson	DeBarge; Joe	4:04
11.	"I Want You"	DeBarge; Henderson	DeBarge	3:44
12.	"I Forgot Ur Name"	DeBarge; Henderson; Luther Vandross	DeBarge	3:34
13.	"Hey U"	DeBarge	DeBarge	3:23
14.	"Chico's Prayer (Interlude)"	DeBarge	DeBarge	0:54

Bonus track
No.	Title	Writer(s)	Producer(s)	Length
15.	"Royalty" (performed by Lylit)	Lylit	Lylit	4:03
Total length:				50:23

Sample credits

- "I Forgot Ur Name" samples from "Never Too Much" (1981) as written and performed by Luther Vandross.

== Charts ==
Chart (2009)	Peak position
US Billboard 200	93
US Top R&B/Hip-Hop Albums (Billboard)	11

== Release history ==
Addiction release history
Region	Date	Format	Label	Ref(s)
Various	July 14, 2009	CD; digital download	Kedar Entertainment	
