= Driving While Black (album) =

Studio album by Bennie Maupin and Dr. Patrick Gleeson
- Released: 1998
- Studios: Different Fur; San Francisco
- Genre: Jazz
- Length: 52:20
- Labels: Intuition Records; INT 3242 2
- Producers: Bennie Maupin, Patrick Gleeson

Bennie Maupin chronology
Moonscapes (1978)	Driving While Black (1998)	Penumbra (2006)

Driving While Black is an album by multi-instrumentalists Bennie Maupin and Dr. Patrick Gleeson. It was recorded at Different Fur Studios in San Francisco, and was issued in 2006 by Intuition Records. It was Maupin's first release as a leader in 20 years.

In an interview, Maupin recalled: "It was my first all-digital recording. It was experimental and a lot of things were not about playing chord changes but exploring tonal relationships... the whole album took about two years to produce. I was knocked out by the things that we did."

Electronic duo Techno Animal did a remix of "Miles to Go" for the album Macro Dub Infection, Vol. 2.

== Reception ==
Professional ratings
Review scores
Source	Rating
AllMusic	4/5 stars
The Penguin Guide to Jazz	3/4 stars

In a review for AllMusic, Christian Genzel wrote that the musicians "have produced an album which skillfully blends '70s fusion and '90s acid jazz: Gleeson's funky hip-hop beats sound fresh and up to date, while his usage of analog synths... breathes a '70s air. Maupin's saxophone playing is powerful and strong on improvisation." He praised "Miles to Go," stating: "Maupin shows that he's still one of the best bass clarinet players around; his screaming and squealing through Gleeson's synth washes is probably his best performance (on record) in years."

The authors of The Penguin Guide to Jazz Recordings called the album "a curious period piece awkwardly transplanted in time," but noted that "Gleeson's rhythms are more than wallpaper for Maupin's plangent saxophone."

== Track listing ==
"Smiling Faces" composed by Norman Whitfield and Barrett Strong. Remaining compositions by Bennie Maupin and Patrick Gleeson.

1. "Smiling Faces" – 6:21
2. "Riverside Drive" – 6:20
3. "The Work" – 6:30
4. "The Lookout" – 5:38
5. "Driving While Black" – 5:24
6. "Bank Float" – 4:35
7. "Miles to Go" – 4:45
8. "In Re: Nude Orbit" – 5:48
9. "Vutu" – 7:01

== Personnel ==
- Bennie Maupin – wind instruments
- Dr. Patrick Gleeson – rhythm instruments
