= Realization (Eddie Henderson album) =

Studio album by Eddie Henderson
- Released: 1973
- Recorded: February 27 and 28, 1973
- Studio: Different Fur Trading Company, San Francisco
- Genre: Jazz fusion
- Length: 39:20
- Label: Capricorn (CP 0118)
- Producer: Skip Drinkwater, Patrick Gleeson

Eddie Henderson chronology
Realization (1973)	Inside Out (1974)

Realization is the debut album by American jazz trumpeter Eddie Henderson recorded in 1973 and released on the Capricorn label.

== Reception ==
Professional ratings
Review scores
Source	Rating
AllMusic	4.5/5 stars
The Rolling Stone Jazz Record Guide	3/5 stars

The AllMusic review by Richard S. Ginell called it "one of the great lost treasures of the jazz-rock era; the music is a bit looser than that of the Hancock records yet every bit as invigorating and forward-thrusting".

== Track listing ==
All compositions by Eddie Henderson except as indicated

1. "Scorpio-Libra" – 11:12
2. "Mars in Libra" – 8:40
3. "Anua" (Bennie Maupin) – 8:50
4. "Spiritual Awakening" – 2:38
5. "Revelation Realization" (Herbie Hancock, Eddie Henderson) – 8:00

== Personnel ==
- Eddie Henderson – trumpet, flugelhorn, cornet
- Bennie Maupin – bass clarinet, flute, alto flute, tenor saxophone
- Herbie Hancock – electric piano
- Patrick Gleeson – synthesizer, organ
- Buster Williams – bass, electric bass
- Billy Hart – drums, percussion
- Lenny White – drums
