= Heritage (Eddie Henderson album) =

Studio album by Eddie Henderson
- Released: 1976
- Recorded: April 2, 1976
- Genre: Jazz-funk
- Length: 38:42
- Label: Blue Note
- Producer: Skip Drinkwater

Eddie Henderson chronology
Sunburst (1975)	Heritage (1976)	Comin' Through (1977)

Heritage is an album by American jazz trumpeter Eddie Henderson, recorded in 1976 and released on the Blue Note label.

== Reception ==
The AllMusic review by Thom Jurk stated, "Heritage is a wonderful set, and should be revisited by anyone who either missed or was put off by it initially. For the new generation of jazz and funk heads, this one is right up your alley -- these are some dark, freaky, and delicious grooves that bear further investigation".

Professional ratings
Review scores
Source	Rating
AllMusic	3.5/5 stars
The Rolling Stone Jazz Record Guide	3/5 stars

== Track listing ==
Compositions by Eddie Henderson except as indicated;

1. "Inside You" (James Mtume) - 4:52
2. "Acuphuncture" (Julian Priester) - 3:44
3. "Time and Space" - 5:19
4. "Nostalgia" (Pat O'Hearn) - 4:12
5. "Kudu" (Patrice Rushen) - 6:08
6. "Dr. Mganga" (Brent Rampone) - 7:33
7. "Dark Shadows" - 6:54
- Recorded at Wally Heider Sound Studios in San Francisco, California, on April 2, 1976.

== Personnel ==
- Eddie Henderson – trumpet, flugelhorn
- Julian Priester – trombone, bass trombone
- Hadley Caliman – soprano saxophone, bass clarinet, flute
- Patrice Rushen – electric piano, clavinet, synthesizer
- Paul Jackson – electric bass
- Mike Clark (tracks 1–5), Woody Theus (tracks 6 & 7), Billy Hart (track 7) – drums
- Mtume – conga, percussion
