= Free (Chico DeBarge album) =

Studio album by Chico DeBarge
- Released: March 5, 2003
- Length: 50:23
- Label: Alove; Koch
- Producer: Chico DeBarge

Chico DeBarge chronology
The Game (1999)	Free (2003)	Addiction (2009)

Free is the fifth studio album by American singer Chico DeBarge. It was released by Alove Entertainment and Koch Records on March 5, 2003 in the United States. The album debuted and peaked at number 43 on the US Top Independent Albums chart, and produced the single "Home Alone." In 2017, the album was remastered and re-released as Free Remastered. It features six additional tracks such as DeBarge's contribution "Hard Times" from the Beauty Shop (2005) soundtrack.

== Critical reception ==
Professional ratings
Review scores
Source	Rating
AllMusic	3.5/5 stars
Vibe	3.5/5 stars

People magazine wrote: "Blending the lush romanticism of Maxwell with the hot-butter sexuality of D'Angelo, DeBarge creates the perfect soundtrack for a night of cuddling under the covers. Like many of today's R&B Romeos, the singer [...] evokes Stevie Wonder and Marvin Gaye throughout this disc [...] Produced and almost entirely written by DeBarge, Free has a warm, personal vibe tailor-made for lovers. Jason King of Vibe critiqued that the record was "too melancholic for urban radio" and contained "standard relationship" lyrics, but praised the "beautifully threadbare" arrangements and felt it was reminiscent of Wonder's 1972 album Music of My Mind, concluding that: "And though DeBarge has yet to develop Stevie's breadth of vision, with Free, he's well on his way to higher ground."

== Track listing ==
No.	Title	Writer(s)	Producer(s)	Length
1.	"It's Cool"	Chico DeBarge	DeBarge	2:52
2.	"Free"	DeBarge	DeBarge	3:27
3.	"Smile (interlude)"	DeBarge	DeBarge	0:31
4.	"Smile"	DeBarge	DeBarge	3:10
5.	"The Unloved"	DeBarge	DeBarge	4:48
6.	"Style"	DeBarge	DeBarge	6:35
7.	"Home Alone"	DeBarge	DeBarge	3:54
8.	"Virtuous"	DeBarge	DeBarge	4:41
9.	"Page from the Journal"	DeBarge	DeBarge	3:27
10.	"Questions"	DeBarge	DeBarge	3:52
11.	"Availability"	DeBarge	DeBarge	3:33
12.	"Not 2 Gether"	DeBarge; Joe	DeBarge; Joe	3:24
13.	"Next Time"	DeBarge; Joe	DeBarge; Joe	4:57
14.	"Royalty (Outro)"	DeBarge	DeBarge	1:11
Total length:				50:23

Free Remastered (2017) bonus tracks
No.	Title	Writer(s)	Producer(s)	Length
15.	"Math"	DeBarge	DeBarge	2:04
16.	"When You Gonna"	DeBarge	DeBarge	2:58
17.	"Be Beautiful"	DeBarge	DeBarge	2:28
18.	"Hard Times"	DeBarge	DeBarge	2:46
19.	"Supermodel"	DeBarge	DeBarge	2:10
20.	"Close to You" (featuring Sean Pen)	DeBarge; Pen	DeBarge	2:47

== Personnel ==
Credits adapted from the liner notes of Free.

- Dexter Browne – photography
- Gabe Chiesa – mixing engineer
- Chico DeBarge – executive producer, producer
- Michel Hand – engineer
- Jean Marie Horvat – mixing engineer
- Rob Reister – engineer, mixing engineer
- Scooby – engineer
- Smurf – executive producer

== Charts ==
Chart (2003)	Peak position
US Independent Albums (Billboard)	43
US Top R&B/Hip-Hop Albums (Billboard)	79

== Release history ==
The Game release history
Region	Date	Format	Label	Ref(s)
Various	March 5, 2003	CD; digital download	Alove; Koch	
Various	September 12, 2017	CD; digital download	Skye	
