= Penumbra (album) =

Studio album by The Bennie Maupin Ensemble
- Released: 2006
- Recorded: June 16 and 17, 2003; December 11, 2006
- Studio: No Sound Studios, Pasadena, California; Crypto Studios, Los Angeles, California
- Genre: Jazz
- Length: 1:00:24
- Label: Cryptogramophone; CG129
- Producer: Bennie Maupin

Bennie Maupin chronology
Driving While Black (1998)	Penumbra (2006)	Early Reflections (2008)

Penumbra is an album by multi-instrumentalist Bennie Maupin. It was recorded in California in 2003 and 2006, and was released in 2006 by Cryptogramophone Records. On the album, Maupin is joined by bassist Darek Oleszkiewicz, drummer Michael Stephans, and percussionist Munyungo Jackson.

== Reception ==
Professional ratings
Review scores
Source	Rating
AllMusic	4.5/5 stars
The Penguin Guide to Jazz	3.5/4 stars
All About Jazz	4.5/5 stars
PopMatters	8/10 stars

In a review for AllMusic, Thom Jurek wrote: "This is a magical, labyrinthine outing for Maupin. His band is top-flight intuitive, practicing a kind of restraint that never forsakes lyric for mere energy and dynamic. This takes not only discipline, but taste, and Maupin and band are positively beatific in their subtlety."

The authors of The Penguin Guide to Jazz Recordings stated that "Blinkers" and "One for Eric Dolphy" are "strong, hard-to-pin-down statements from a man who's contributed hugely to the background sound of modern jazz but who's still not easily picked out of a line-up."

John Kelman of All About Jazz commented: "Penumbra may surprise listeners expecting Maupin to carry on the electric vibe of The Jewel in the Lotus and Driving While Black, but in many ways the looser organic nature of this effort makes it his most personal and satisfying record to date."

Writing for PopMatters, Daniel Spicer remarked: "Finally, it seems, Maupin is summoning up the gravitas we've hoped for all these years — assuming his rightful position as the pre-eminent bass clarinettist in contemporary jazz, stepping out of the shadow cast by his old teacher, Eric Dolphy... These are messages from the interzone, a summation, signposts. Past and future meeting here and now."

In an article for Something Else!, Mark Saleski wrote: "Maupin's very flexible group does manage to focus so tightly on certain ideas that the musical conceptions make the listener forget about the existence of a group... When the grooves peak on this album, it's very reminiscent of those Miles and Herbie Hancock records that Maupin was a part of."

Chris Kelsey of Jazz Times stated: "There's tons to like and virtually nothing to dislike on Penumbra. Intellectually and emotionally, this music is as nakedly honest and engaging as it gets."

Writing for Dusted Magazine, Derek Taylor commented: "A relaxed and productive temperament pervades the entire album, making it easy to take [Michael] Stephans' observation in the liners that 'we no longer play the music; the music plays us' as tenable gospel."

== Track listing ==
All compositions by Bennie Maupin.

1. "Neophilia 2006" – 4:36
2. "Walter Bishop Jr." – 6:37
3. "Level Three" – 3:18
4. "Blinkers" – 1:24
5. "Penumbra" – 7:06
6. "Mirror Image" – 1:17
7. "Message to Prez" – 6:07
8. "Tapping Things" – 5:40
9. "Vapors" – 4:45
10. "One for Eric Dolphy" – 2:38
11. "See the Positive" – 2:53
12. "Trope on a Rope" – 3:51
13. "The 12th Day" – 2:58
14. "Equal Justice" – 7:15
- Track 14 was recorded on December 11, 2006, at Crypto Studios in Los Angeles, California. Remaining tracks were recorded on June 16 and 17, 2003, at No Sound Studios in Pasadena, California.

== Personnel ==
- Bennie Maupin – bass clarinet, tenor saxophone, soprano saxophone, alto flute, piano
- Darek Oleszkiewicz – bass
- Michael Stephans – drums
- Munyungo Jackson – percussion
