= The Game (Chico DeBarge album) =

Studio album by Chico DeBarge
- Released: October 26, 1999
- Recorded: 1998
- Length: 56:48
- Label: Motown
- Producer: Chico DeBarge; El DeBarge; Brian McKnight; Vada Nobles; Shandi Quildon; Soulshock & Karlin

Chico DeBarge chronology
Long Time No See (1997)	The Game (1999)	Free (2003)

The Game is the fourth studio album by American singer Chico DeBarge. It was released by Motown Records on October 26, 1999 in the United States. The album marked DeBarge's return to Motown Records since 1988 after Kedar Entertainment founder Kedar Massenburg was appointed as head of the label in late 1998. The Game peaked at number 41 on the US Billboard 200 and number 6 on the Top R&B/Hip-Hop Albums chart.

== Critical reception ==
Professional ratings
Review scores
Source	Rating
AllMusic	2.5/5 stars
Robert Christgau	(choice cut)

AllMusic editor Jon Azpiri rated the album two and a half stars out of five. He found that "many of the tracks on The Game feel deeply autobiographical [...] Tracks like the self-explanatory "Sexual" are filled with the kind of growls and yelps of joy that you'd hear on a Marvin Gaye record. While Debarge falls well short of a master like Gaye, he is well on his way to becoming a distinct artist, a welcome relief from much of late-'90s R&B which seems to come off an assembly line."

== Track listing ==
No.	Title	Writer(s)	Producer(s)	Length
1.	"The Game"	Chico DeBarge; James Henderson	C. DeBarge	4:49
2.	"Give You What You Want (Fa Sure)"	C. DeBarge; Carsten Schack; Kenneth Karlin; Rahsaan Patterson	C. DeBarge; Soulshock & Karlin	4:40
3.	"Listen to Your Man" (featuring Joe)	C. DeBarge; Juanita Stokes	C. DeBarge; Vada Nobles	5:16
4.	"Sorry"	C. DeBarge; Andrea Martin; Ivan Matias; Shandi Quildon	C. DeBarge; Quildon	4:43
5.	"Everybody Knew But Me"	C. DeBarge; El DeBarge; Henderson	C. DeBarge; E. DeBarge	5:54
6.	"Sexual"	C. DeBarge; Henderson	C. DeBarge	3:58
7.	"Till Tomorrow"	Marvin Gaye	C. DeBarge; E. DeBarge	3:58
8.	"When Can I See You Again"	Brian McKnight	McKnight	4:52
9.	"Talk About You" (featuring Bobby Brown)	C. DeBarge; Henderson	C. DeBarge	4:55
10.	"The Edge"	C. DeBarge; Andrea Bordenave	C. DeBarge	3:22
11.	"Your Way"	C. DeBarge; Bordenave	C. DeBarge	4:26
12.	"Heart, Mind & Soul"	Bruce Fisher; E. DeBarge; Leon Ware	C. DeBarge; E. DeBarge	5:46
Total length:				56:48

Notes

- "Heart Mind & Soul" is a cover of the title track of the 1994 album from DeBarge's brother El DeBarge.

== Personnel ==
Credits adapted from the liner notes of The Game.

- Doug E. Fresh – beatbox on "Listen to Your Man"
- Andrea Martin – background vocals on "Sorry"
- Benjamin Wright – string arrangement on "Everybody Knew But Me" and "Heart, Mind & Soul"
- DJ Quik – mixing on "Till Tomorrow"
- Brian McKnight – background vocals on "When Can I See You Again"
- Mama DeBarge – additional vocals on "Heart, Mind & Soul"
- Wah Wah Watson – guitar on "Heart, Mind & Soul"

== Charts ==
Chart (1999)	Peak position
Canada (RPM Top 100)	30
US Billboard 200	41
US Top R&B/Hip-Hop Albums (Billboard)	6

== Release history ==
The Game release history
Region	Date	Format	Label	Ref(s)
United States	October 26, 1999	CD; cassette	Motown	
