= Fat Albert and the Cosby Kids =

American animated television series

- Also known as: Fat Albert; The New Fat Albert Show; The Adventures of Fat Albert and the Cosby Kids
- Genre: Comedy drama; Slapstick; Educational; Slice of life
- Created by: Bill Cosby
- Developed by: Bill Cosby
- Directed by: Hal Sutherland
- Creative director: Don Christensen
- Starring: Bill Cosby
- Voices of: Bill Cosby; Lou Scheimer; Jan Crawford; Gerald Edwards; Pepe Brown; Eric Suter; Jay Scheimer; Erika Scheimer; Lane Scheimer; Keith Sutherland; Eric Greene; Ty Henderson; Kim Hamilton; Lee Chamberlin; Frank Welker; Linda Gary
- Narrated by: Bill Cosby
- Theme music composer: Ricky Sheldon; Edward Fournier
- Opening theme: "Gonna Have a Good Time (Fat Albert Theme)" (Performed by Michael Gray)
- Ending theme: "Gonna Have a Good Time (Fat Albert Theme)" (Instrumental)
- Composer: Ricky Sheldon
- Country of origin: United States
- Original language: English
- No. of seasons: 8
- No. of episodes: 110 (+ 5 specials) (list of episodes)

Production
- Executive producer: Bill Cosby
- Producers: Lou Scheimer; Norm Prescott (1972–84)
- Production location: California
- Editor: Lou Scheimer
- Camera setup: N/A
- Running time: 20 minutes (regular episodes)
- Production companies: Filmation The Campbell, Silver, Cosby Corporation

Original release
- Network: CBS
- Release: September 9, 1972 – November 13, 1982
- Network: First-run syndication
- Release: September 1, 1984 – August 10, 1985

Related
- Hey, Hey, Hey, It's Fat Albert (1969)

Fat Albert and the Cosby Kids (often referred to simply as Fat Albert) is an American educational animated television series created, produced, and hosted (in live action bookends) by comedian Bill Cosby, who also lent his voice to a number of characters, including Fat Albert himself. Filmation was the production company for the series. The show premiered in 1972 and aired until 1985 (with new episodes being produced sporadically during that time frame). The show, based on Cosby's remembrances of his childhood friend group, focused on Fat Albert (known for his catchphrase "Hey hey hey!") and his friends.

The show features an educational lesson in each episode, emphasized by Cosby's live-action segments. In addition, at the end of the early episodes, the gang typically gathers in their North Philadelphia junkyard to play a song on their cobbled-together instruments, summarizing the show's lesson.

The New York Times noted that the show "enjoyed enormous success" throughout its run. The show's success led Cosby to create a second animated series, Little Bill, in the late 1990s. Little Bill was designed to be visually different from Fat Albert, while retaining similar educational lessons and roots in Cosby's childhood experiences.

== Origins and history ==
The character Fat Albert first appeared in Bill Cosby's stand-up comedy routine "Buck Buck," as recorded on his 1967 album Revenge. The stories were based upon Cosby's tales about growing up in inner city North Philadelphia. In 1969, Cosby and veteran animator Ken Mundie brought Fat Albert to animation in a prime-time special entitled Hey, Hey, Hey, It's Fat Albert.

The special, which aired on NBC, was a hybrid of live action and animation. The music for the special was written and performed by jazz pianist/keyboardist Herbie Hancock in 1969 and was released on the Warner Bros. album Fat Albert Rotunda. For the animated portion of the special, it was necessary to develop the actual appearance of each of the Fat Albert Gang's characters. For this, Ken Mundie relied on animator Amby Paliwoda, a former Disney artist. Paliwoda not only created all the Gang's characters, but painted a "group portrait" which was eventually shown on the front page of TV Guide magazine shortly before the showing of the special.

The producers wanted NBC to bring Fat Albert to Saturday mornings, but the network programming managers rejected this because the series was too educational. Bill Cosby and a new production company, Filmation Associates, then took the property to CBS. The Fat Albert gang's character images were primarily created by the artist Randy Hollar, with the assistance of one-time Disney animator Michelle McKinney, under the direction of Ken Brown. Following these changes, two new characters, James "Mushmouth" Mush and Bucky Miller, were added to replace Nolan and Weasel from the 1969 pilot while six other main cast members would return. Filmation provided the animation for the show.

Retitled Fat Albert and the Cosby Kids, the series premiered on September 9, 1972, on CBS. Production lasted for 12 years, though production of the series was not continuous. It also spent another season in first-run syndication (1984–85). Three prime-time holiday specials (Halloween, Christmas, and Easter) featuring the characters were also produced. Like most Saturday morning cartoons of the era, Fat Albert and the Cosby Kids contained an adult laugh track, which was eliminated during the final season. The series was rerun on NBC Saturday mornings and on the USA Network in 1989.

In the late 1990s, Bill Cosby developed a second animated series, Little Bill, which was intentionally designed to look different from Fat Albert. The executive producer of Little Bill, Janice Burgess, stated that the Fat Albert character was "more broadly comic" and exaggeratedly cartoonish than Little Bill. However, the two shows shared similar educational messages.

== Characters ==
=== The Cosby Kids ===
- Fat Albert Robertson (voiced by Bill Cosby; singing voice by Michael Gray) is based on Cosby's childhood friend Albert Robertson. The main character in the series, he is usually the conscience of the Junkyard Gang. Though very obese, he is athletic and enjoys playing sports. He always wears a burnt orange shirt (which became red later on) and blue pants. Civic-minded and wise beyond his years, Fat Albert works hard to maintain integrity in the gang and with others, and is the lead singer as well as a bagpipe-accordion (made from a funnel, radiator and an airbag) player in the Junkyard Band and on occasion, plays the bedspring.
- James "Mushmouth" Mush (voiced by Bill Cosby) is a slack-jawed simpleton with big lips. He always wears a red knit hat with a blue scarf and always speaks in virtual Ubbi Dubbi, tantamount to an overdose of novocaine in the mouth, which Cosby would later use in the "Dentist" monologue from his 1983 film, Himself. Mushmouth plays a homemade electric bass guitar in the Junkyard Band (replaced with an accordion in the live-action movie).
- "Dumb" Donald Parker (voiced by Lou Scheimer) is a lanky, dimwitted fellow. He is Rudy's best friend. He always wears a green long-sleeved jersey three sizes too big, and a pink stocking knit cap covering his entire face except his eyes and his mouth. In the Junkyard Band, he plays a trombone made out of plumbers' pipe and a morning glory horn from an old phonograph. In the Fat Albert film and while in the real world, Donald takes off his knit cap and learns that he has a handsome face.
- William "Bill" Cosby (voiced by Himself) is a character based on Bill Cosby himself and he is the host of the series. Like the others, Bill Cosby is a good athlete and enjoys playing sports. However, he spends most of his time trying, often unsuccessfully, to keep his little brother Russell out of trouble. Like Fat Albert, Bill Cosby is often a voice of reason in the gang, although at times a little more stubborn. In the Junkyard Band, he plays a set of homemade drums made from a discarded foot-pedal trash can/garbage can using two metal spoons for drumsticks.
- Russell Cosby (voiced by Jan Crawford) is Bill's younger brother (based on his real-life brother—whom he often talked about in his routines) and the smallest and youngest of the Junkyard Gang. He always wears a heavy blue winter jacket, a yellow winter scarf, red winter boots, and a dark blue Ushanka winter hat regardless of the weather. Russell has a penchant for making snide remarks and blunt observations (much to his older brother's consternation). Russell frequently criticizes Rudy, reserving his most withering insults for when Rudy is being especially cocky. His catchphrase is "no class". He plays the xylophone in the Junkyard Band (made out of empty cans and a discarded coat rack).
- "Weird" Harold Simmons (voiced by Gerald Edwards) is a tall, skinny, beady-eyed kid who is the tallest one of the Junkyard Gang and always wears a gold dress blazer, a brown sock on 1 foot and a red sock on the other foot, and he is clumsy. In the Junkyard Band, he plays a harp made from bedsprings, and on occasion plays a "dressmaker dummy" in the percussion section. In the film adaptation, he is called "Old Weird Harold", as he was in Bill Cosby's stand-up routines.
- Rudy Davis (voiced by Pepe Brown for the first two seasons, then Eric Suter for the rest of the series) is a sharp-dressed, smooth-talking, cocky huckster whose smart-aleck attitude frequently gets him into trouble. He is Dumb Donald's best friend. Rudy's cocky attitude and dismissive demeanor are often the catalyst for a typical plot's conflict. But inside he has a good heart and usually learns lessons from his mistakes. In the Junkyard Band, he plays a makeshift banjo, whose parts include a broomstick handle and sewing-thread spool to hold the strings. However, when shown playing apart from the others, Rudy plays an electric guitar (personalized with a big "R"). He always wears an orange flat cap, a fuchsia vest, a pink turtleneck/sweater, purple bell-bottom jeans, and boots. Rudy's personality in the Fat Albert movie is much different as he is portrayed as a kind and chivalrous gentleman who falls in love with the female lead Doris (Kyla Pratt).
- Bucky Miller (voiced by Jan Crawford), as his name indicates, has a large overbite. He is a quick and flexible athlete. Bucky plays a stovepipe organ in the Junkyard Band.

=== Others ===
- Miss Berry is the kids' first school teacher and mentor. She is later replaced by Mrs. Breyfogle. In later seasons, the kids went into a different school where their school teacher and mentor was Miss Wucher. All three characters were voiced by Jay Scheimer, wife of executive producer Lou Scheimer.
- Mudfoot Brown (voiced by Bill Cosby) is a wise old man and unemployed vagrant who gives advice to the gang, often using reverse psychology to get his point across. He has a talent for telling tall tales. He makes a minor appearance in the film adaptation at the beginning and end of the film, voiced by Earl Billings. However, he is never referred to by name in the film.
- The Brown Hornet (voiced by Bill Cosby) is the title character of a show about an African-American superhero whose cartoons were watched regularly by the gang. He is a parody of the Green Hornet.
  - Stinger (voiced by Lou Scheimer) is the Brown Hornet's beefy sidekick whose gruff exterior masks a soft heart.
  - Tweeterbell (voiced by Erika Scheimer) is a female robot assistant to the Brown Hornet and Stinger.
- Cluck (voiced by Lou Scheimer) is a domestic duck that followed the gang regularly in early episodes, but stopped appearing after season 1.
- Legal Eagle (voiced by Lou Scheimer) is another show-within-a-show, involving a crime-fighting cartoon bald eagle.
  - Moe and Gabby (voiced by Jan Crawford and Gerald Edwards) are two lazy, klutzy tree squirrel underlings that work with Legal Eagle as police officers.
- Margene (voiced by Erika Scheimer) is a classmate and good friend of Fat Albert's. In one episode she and Albert ran for co-president of the Student Council and beat out two other candidates, both of whom were running on platforms of racism. A straight-A student, Margene occasionally got in with the wrong people but always managed to rebound; in a different episode she got hooked on drugs, and in another she got innocently involved in a violent cult.
- The 3 River Blockbusters are the Junkyard Gang's main rivals when it comes to competing in sports such as baseball and football. The Blockbusters stole the championship in a competition called "buck buck" in the episode "Moving". One of them was voiced by Gerald Edwards, and another was voiced by Pepe Brown. They make an appearance in the film adaptation, which features totally different members, with the leader, dubbed as Crips, voiced by Catero Colbert and credited as "Lead Teen".
- Pee Wee (voiced by Keith Sutherland) is a small boy who looks up to Fat Albert and the gang. While being small in stature, his best athletic skill is kicking a football at a long distance. When the bigger kids could not get anything out of a small van, Pee Wee is there to retrieve it.

Lou Scheimer, Jay Scheimer, Erika Scheimer (as "Erika Carroll"), Lane Scheimer (as "Lane Vaux"), Keith Sutherland, Bill Cosby, Pepe Brown, Eric Suter, Gerald Edwards, Jan Crawford, Eric Greene, Ty Henderson, Kim Hamilton, Lee Chamberlin, Frank Welker, and Linda Gary provided additional voices.

== Educational lessons and songs ==
Fat Albert was honored and noted for its educational content, which included Cosby earning a Doctorate in Education. In every show's opening Cosby would playfully warn:

This is Bill Cosby comin' at you with (lots of) music and fun, and if you're not careful, you may learn something before it's done.
So let's get ready, OK? (Fat Albert voice) Hey, hey, hey!

During each episode, Fat Albert and his friends (aka The Junkyard Gang), dealt with an issue or problem commonly faced by children, ranging from stage fright, first loves, medical operations, and personal hygiene to more serious themes (though toned down for younger children) including vandalism, stealing, racism, rape, smoking, being scammed by con artists, sexually transmitted diseases, child abuse, kidnapping, drug use, gun violence, and death.

At the end of most episodes (with some exceptions in the case of particularly serious themes), the gang would sing a song about the theme of the day. This sequence, similar to those seen in other Filmation shows including The Archie Show, has often been parodied. The musical sequence was dropped during the Brown Hornet/Legal Eagle years. When Fat Albert entered syndication, some of the episodes produced prior to 1979 had their songs removed in favor of a Brown Hornet story. This was the case with "Shuttered Window" which dealt with the issue of death, in which the Brown Hornet encountered a robotic teacher and leader who realizes that his functions are worn out will soon cease to function. The teacher informs Hornet of this fact and Hornet has to let the teacher's citizens know that they must go on without their leader/teacher. This sets up the real world story regarding the recurring character Undeen and the sudden death of her Uncle Monty (although no reference to the Brown Hornet story told by Fat Albert as is the normal case in the 1979–84 episodes).

The series enjoyed one of the longest runs in the history of Saturday morning cartoons.

== Revamps and renames ==
In 1979, the series was renamed The New Fat Albert Show and featured a new segment titled "The Brown Hornet" detailing the adventures of a black crime fighter in outer space whose design resembled a caricature of Bill Cosby, who also performed vocal talents on the character. His shows always contained an object lesson for the viewers. The gang would watch the program at the beginning of each episode, and then they would invariably face a situation that forced them to apply the object lesson.

In 1984, the series was syndicated and renamed The Adventures of Fat Albert and the Cosby Kids. The lack of network restrictions allowed the producers to explore more mature themes. For instance, one episode ("Busted") featured the Junkyard Gang touring a maximum security prison; this episode included prisoners uttering expletives such as "hell" and "bastard", with Cosby preemptively informing viewers that such language would be used to authentically portray prison life. Another episode, "Gang Wars", depicted a child being shot and killed. Another segment was added: "Legal Eagle", a crime-fighting eagle with a pair of bumbling police deputy squirrels. Production of new episodes ceased in 1985.

== Theme song ==
The theme song, "Gonna Have a Good Time", was composed by Ricky Sheldon and Edward Fournier, and performed by Michael Gray (vocals), Kim Carnes (background vocals) and Edward Fournier (background vocals).

A cover of the show's theme song, performed by Dig, is included on the 1995 tribute album Saturday Morning: Cartoons' Greatest Hits, produced by Ralph Sall and released on MCA Records. The song's chorus ("Na-na-na, gonna have a good time!") was also sampled in Fatboy Slim's 1998 hit single "Praise You".

== Reception ==
Fat Albert and the Cosby Kids was named the 82nd best animated series by IGN.

Fat Albert and the Cosby Kids received an Emmy nomination in 1974. Production of the final season of the series overlapped with the start of production of Bill Cosby's live-action sitcom, The Cosby Show, which began airing on NBC in fall 1984.

In 1993, TV Guide magazine named Fat Albert and the Cosby Kids the best cartoon series of the 1970s in its issue celebrating 40 years of television.

In 2002, Fat Albert was placed at number 12 on TV Guide's list of the 50 Greatest Cartoon Characters of All Time.

In 2020, Joyce Slaton of Common Sense Media argued that the series is an "old-school cartoon...[with] strong positive messages." She noted that while the show's themes like kidnapping, racism, and child abuse may cause parents to be concerned, there is "fresh humor, funky music, and the strong positive messages".

The US Navy Blue Angels flight demonstration team flies a C-130J Super Hercules nicknamed "Fat Albert" after the series' character.

== Availability ==
=== Syndication ===
As of 2013, Fat Albert was seen Saturday mornings on Retro Television Network (RTV), TheCoolTV, and weekdays and weekends on Bounce TV, both of which are digital networks. It was also seen weekdays on the now-defunct Sky Angel services Angel Two and Kids & Teens TV, as well as World Harvest Television.

As of July 2015, Fat Albert was no longer on Bounce TV's lineup. Bounce TV had previously pulled the comedy series Cosby from their lineup in the wake of the Bill Cosby sexual assault allegations, but it is unclear if the cancellations of the Fat Albert episodes was related to these allegations. However, several months after returning reruns of The Cosby Show in December 2016, Bounce TV quietly re-added Fat Albert to its schedule in March 2017, until it was eventually removed from the schedule again in late April 2018. As of 2025, there are seldom attempts to re-air this program in reruns at this time as further details are undisclosed.

=== Home media ===
During the mid-1980s, Thorn EMI Video released several volumes of Fat Albert and the Cosby Kids on VHS as part of their "Children's Matinee" line of animated programs, with each cassette typically containing three episodes. Additional volumes were released later in the decade by Video Treasures, including the three holiday specials.

In 2002, Time Life distributed 11 volumes of the series on VHS and DVD through mail-order. Each volume contained two episodes, with the DVD releases containing a bonus third episode, along with character profiles and a bonus Brown Hornet segment from the 1980-82 seasons. The episodes included were from the 1972-76 seasons, with only one coming from the New Fat Albert season in 1979. Some of the episodes were edited versions, either using 1979-82 Brown Hornet re-broadcasts in place of the closing song segments, 1984 re-broadcasts with the live-action Cosby segments re-filmed, or alternate prints of 1972 episodes with no laugh track. The 11th volume included the Christmas and Halloween specials. These were the only DVD releases to present the show in its original NTSC format, as future DVD releases use PAL prints.

In 2004, UrbanWorks Entertainment acquired the rights to the series, subsequently releasing several Fat Albert and the Cosby Kids DVDs including a two-volume collection featuring 24 episodes, as well as all specials to coincide with the theatrical release of the feature film adaptation. Volume 1 contains two DVDs with episodes 1–12 (airdates 9/9–11/25/1972), along with a CD containing the opening theme, the closing theme, and 12 songs from each of the 12 episodes shown in vol. 1 Volume 2 contains two discs with episodes 13–24 (airdates 12/2/1972–9/13/1975), along with a CD containing the opening theme, the closing theme, and 12 songs from each of the 12 episodes shown in vol. 2. In addition, UrbanWorks Entertainment released a Greatest Hits four-disc DVD box set, containing 20 uncut episodes in their original broadcast presentation and original airdate order, as well as a five-best episodes set via Ventura Distribution.

In 2008, Classic Media acquired the rights to the series and stated at the time that they intended to release the entire series on DVD. This never happened as they only re-released The Fat Albert Halloween Special and The Fat Albert Easter Special on DVD via distribution partner Genius Products.

On April 6, 2012, it was announced that Shout! Factory had acquired the rights to the series (under license from Classic Media) and planned to release a complete series box set on DVD. The DVD set was released on June 25, 2013.

On September 4, 2012, Classic Media re-released all three holiday specials together in one collection entitled The Hey Hey Hey Holiday Collection on DVD in Region 1.

== Other media ==
Gold Key Comics released a comic book adaptation of Fat Albert, which ran for 29 issues from 1974 to 1979.

In 2012, Fat Albert and the Cosby Kids appeared in MetLife's "Everyone" commercial during Super Bowl XLVI.

== Film adaptation ==
In 2004, 20th Century Fox released a film adaptation of the series titled Fat Albert. The film stars Kenan Thompson as Fat Albert, Kyla Pratt, and Dania Ramirez. The film acts as a sequel to the series where Fat Albert and the gang journey into the real world after jumping out of a television in order to help a lonely girl named Doris with her social anxiety. The boys enjoy being in the real world but after a meeting with their creator, Bill Cosby, Fat Albert is informed that if he and the others do not return to the television world soon, they will turn into celluloid dust. The film received negative reviews upon release and was considered a box-office disappointment, only grossing $48 million on a budget of $45 million. It remains the most recent piece of Fat Albert media to date.

== See also ==
- Little Bill
