= Crossings (Herbie Hancock album) =

Studio album by Herbie Hancock
- Released: May 1972
- Recorded: February 15–17, 1972
- Studio: Pacific (San Mateo); Different Fur (San Francisco)
- Genre: Avant-garde jazz, jazz fusion
- Length: 46:21
- Label: Warner Bros.
- Producer: David Rubinson

Herbie Hancock chronology
Mwandishi (1971)	Crossings (1972)	Sextant (1973)

Professional ratings
Review scores
Source	Rating
Allmusic	5/5 stars
DownBeat	2/5 stars
The Penguin Guide to Jazz Recordings	3/4 stars
The Rolling Stone Jazz Record Guide	4/5 stars

Crossings is the tenth studio album by jazz pianist Herbie Hancock, released in May 1972 on Warner Bros. Records.

It is the second album in his Mwandishi period, which saw him experimenting in electronics and funk with a sextet featuring saxophonist Bennie Maupin, trumpeter Eddie Henderson, trombonist Julian Priester, bassist Buster Williams, and drummer Billy Hart. The album is the band's first to feature synthesizer player Patrick Gleeson, originally hired as a technician to help set up Hancock's Moog synthesizer; Hancock was so impressed with Gleeson that he "asked Gleeson not only to do the overdubs on the album but join the group."

Crossings, along with Fat Albert Rotunda and Mwandishi, was reissued in one set as Mwandishi: The Complete Warner Bros. Recordings in 1994 and as The Warner Bros. Years (1969-1972) in 2014.

== Track listing ==
Side A
No.	Title	Writer(s)	Length
1.	"Sleeping Giant"	Herbie Hancock	24:38
Total length:			24:38

Side B
No.	Title	Writer(s)	Length
2.	"Quasar"	Bennie Maupin	7:27
3.	"Water Torture"	Maupin	14:04
Total length:			21:21

== Personnel ==
- Herbie Hancock – piano, Rhodes piano, Mellotron, percussion
- Eddie Henderson – trumpet, flugelhorn, percussion
- Bennie Maupin – soprano saxophone, alto flute, bass clarinet, piccolo, percussion
- Julian Priester – trombone, alto trombone, bass, percussion
- Buster Williams – bass guitar, double bass, percussion
- Billy Hart – drums, percussion

With:

- Patrick Gleeson – Moog synthesizer, Mellotron
- Victor Pantoja – congas
- Candy Love, Sandra Stevens, Della Horne, Victoria Domagalski, Scott Beach – voices
