= Chico DeBarge (album) =

Studio album by Chico DeBarge
- Released: 1986
- Studio: Skip Saylor Recording, Fiddler Studio, Monterrey Sound Studios, Motown Recording Studios, Silverlake Studios, Eldorado Recording Studios, Summa Studios, United Sounds Studios, Sheika Studios
- Length: 43:12
- Label: Motown
- Producer: Ralph Benetar; Chico DeBarge; Skip Drinkwater; Tommy Faragher; Curtis Anthony Nolen; Galen L. Senogles; Gary Taylor

Chico DeBarge chronology
Chico DeBarge (1986)	Kiss Serious (1988)

Chico DeBarge is the debut album by American singer Chico DeBarge. It was released by Motown Records in 1986 in the United States. The album peaked at number 90 on the US Billboard 200 and number 25 on the Top R&B/Hip-Hop Albums chart. Chico DeBarge spawned the hit single "Talk to Me."

== Critical reception ==
Professional ratings
Review scores
Source	Rating
AllMusic	4/5 stars

AllMusic editor Rick A. Bueche called Chico DeBarge his "best album for Motown" as well as "a fine start."

== Track listing ==
No.	Title	Writer(s)	Producer(s)	Length
1.	"Talk to Me"	Franne Golde; Nick Mundy; Paul Fox	Skip Drinkwater; Hazel Payne^{[a]}; Mundy^{[b]}; Fox^{[b]}	5:22
2.	"Who Are You Kidding"	Jay Gruska; Joseph Williams	Curtis Anthony Nolen	3:56
3.	"You Can Make It Better"	Bobby DeBarge	Nolen	3:53
4.	"Desperate"	Bobby DeBarge	Chico DeBarge; Nolen	3:38
5.	"I'll Love You for Now"	Galen L. Senogles; Lorenzo Pryor; Ralph Benatar	Senogles; Benatar	4:56
6.	"I Like My Body"	Gary Taylor	Taylor	4:44
7.	"The Girl Next Door"	Carl Sturken; Evan Rogers	Drinkwater; Tommy Faragher	4:39
8.	"Cross That Line"	Chico DeBarge	C. DeBarge; Nolen^{[a]}; Senogles^{[a]}; Benatar^{[a]}	4:53
9.	"You're Much Too Fast"	C. DeBarge; Nolen	Nolen	3:33
10.	"If It Takes All Night"	C. DeBarge; Darryl DeBarge	C. DeBarge; Nolen	3:38
Total length:				43:12

Notes

- ^{^a} signifies co-producer(s)
- ^{^b} signifies associate producer(s)

== Personnel ==
- Chico DeBarge – vocals, keyboards (4, 8, 10), synthesizer (4, 8, 10)
- Skip Drinkwater – drum computer programming (1)
- Nick Mundy – guitar (1), synthesizer (1), drum computer programming (1), backing vocals (1)
- Steve Dubin – bass synthesizer (1), drum computer programming (1, 7), percussion (7)
- Paul Fox – synthesizer (1), drum computer programming (1), programming (4, 10)
- Curtis Anthony Nolen – keyboards (2, 3), drum programming (2), backing vocals (2)
- Jay Gruska – keyboards (3, 8 (overdubs), 9), drum programming (3, 9)
- Paul Jackson Jr. – rhythm guitar (4)
- Ralph Benatar – keyboards (5), soprano saxophone (5), Linn drums (5), programming (8)
- Lorenzo Pryor – bass (5)
- Larry Lingle – electric guitar (5)
- Michael Dorian – keyboards (5)
- Thomas Organ – guitar (6)
- Gary Taylor – DMX synthesizer programming (6), backing vocals (6)
- Dan Segal – synthesizer programming (6)
- Kevin O'Neal – synthesizer (6)
- Neil Stubenhause (sic) – bass (7)
- Dann Huff – guitar (7)
- Tommy Faragher – synthesizer (7)
- Nathan East – bass (9)
- Dee Dee Belson – backing vocals (1)
- Maxie Anderson – backing vocals (1, 2, 3, 9)
- Alfie Silas – backing vocals (2, 3, 9)
- Phyllis St. James – backing vocals (2, 3, 9)
- Darryl DeBarge – backing vocals (4)
- James DeBarge – backing vocals (4, 5, 7)
- David Paul Bryant – backing vocals (7)
- DeBarge – backing vocals (8)

== Charts ==
Chart (1986)	Peak position
US Billboard 200	90
US Top R&B/Hip-Hop Albums (Billboard)	25
