= Yesterday's Dreams (Alphonso Johnson album) =

Studio album by Alphonso Johnson
- Released: 1976
- Studios: Cherokee Studios, Los Angeles; Sound Labs, Hollywood
- Genres: Jazz-funk, jazz, jazz fusion
- Length: 35:21
- Label: Epic
- Producer: Skip Drinkwater

Alphonso Johnson chronology
Moonshadows (1976)	Yesterday's Dreams (1976)	Spellbound (1977)

Yesterday's Dreams is an album by American jazz bass guitarist Alphonso Johnson that was released in 1976 by Epic Records. The album reached No. 28 on the Billboard magazine Jazz Albums chart.

== Overview ==
Yesterday's Dreams was executively produced by Jerry Schoenbaum. Artists such as Grover Washington Jr., Sheila E., Philip Bailey, Flora Purim, Dianne Reeves, Lee Ritenour and Patrice Rushen also appeared upon the album. The album marked Sheila E.'s debut as a recording artist.

== Critical reception ==
Professional ratings
Review scores
Source	Rating
AllMusic	3/5 stars

Allmusic gave the album a three out of five stars rating.

== Track listing ==
No.	Title	Writer(s)	Length
1.	"Love's the Way I Feel 'Bout Cha"	Alphonso Johnson, Pat Walker, Phillip Bailey	4:45
2.	"As Little as You"	Alphonso Johnson	3:24
3.	"Scapegoat"	Alphonso Johnson	5:09
4.	"Show Us the Way"	Alphonso Johnson	4:56
5.	"Balls to the Wall"	Alphonso Johnson	5:01
6.	"Tales of Barcelona"	Alphonso Johnson	2:17
7.	"Flight to Hampstead Heath"	Alphonso Johnson	5:57
8.	"One to One"	Sheila Escovedo, Ray Gomez, McKinley Jackson, Alphonso Johnson, Patrice Rushen, Chester Thompson	3:52

== Personnel ==
- Alphonso Johnson – guitar, bass guitar, Chapman Stick, vocals
- Chuck Findley – trumpet
- Gary Grant – trumpet, flugelhorn
- George Bohanon – trombone
- Garnett Brown – trombone
- Grover Washington Jr. – tenor saxophone
- Ernie Watts – tenor saxophone
- Ernie Fields – baritone saxophone, flute
- Mark T. Jordan – organ
- David Foster – organ
- Patrice Rushen – electric piano, clavinet, harpsichord
- Ian Underwood – synthesizer
- Ray Gomez – guitar
- Lee Ritenour – guitar
- Mike Clark – drums
- Chester Thompson – drums
- Sheila Escovedo – percussion
- Ruth Underwood – percussion
- Philip Bailey – vocals
- Jon Lucien – vocals
- Dianne Reeves – vocals

Technical

- Bruce Heigh - assistant producer
- Jerry Schoenbaum - executive producer
- Don Murray - engineer
- Tommy Vicari - remixing engineer
- Ken Anderson, Ron Coro - design
- Bill Imhoff - cover illustration
