= Inside Out (Eddie Henderson album) =

Studio album by Eddie Henderson
- Released: 1974
- Recorded: October 1973
- Studios: Different Fur Trading Company, San Francisco
- Genre: Jazz fusion
- Label: Capricorn CP 0122
- Producer: Skip Drinkwater

Eddie Henderson chronology
Realization (1973)	Inside Out (1974)	Sunburst (1975)

Inside Out is an album by American jazz trumpeter Eddie Henderson, recorded in 1973 and released on the Capricorn label.

== Reception ==
The AllMusic review by Richard S. Ginell called it "open-ended and almost free, heavily electronic, spiritual in intent, and enormously stimulating".

Professional ratings
Review scores
Source	Rating
AllMusic	4/5 stars
The Rolling Stone Jazz Record Guide	3/5 stars

== Track listing ==
All compositions by Eddie Henderson except as indicated

1. "Moussaka" (Bennie Maupin) - 8:59
2. "Omnipresence" - 2:14
3. "Discoveries" - 5:08
4. "Fusion" - 3:33
5. "Dreams" - 7:21
6. "Inside Out" - 9:25
7. "Exit #1" (Maupin) - 2:54

== Personnel ==
- Eddie Henderson – trumpet, flugelhorn, cornet
- Bennie Maupin – clarinet, bass clarinet, flute, alto flute, piccolo flute, tenor saxophone
- Herbie Hancock – electric piano, clavinet, organ
- Patrick Gleeson – synthesizer
- Buster Williams – bass, electric bass
- Eric Gravatt, Billy Hart – drums
- Bill Summers – congas
