= Darek Oleszkiewicz =

Polish-born jazz musician and composer

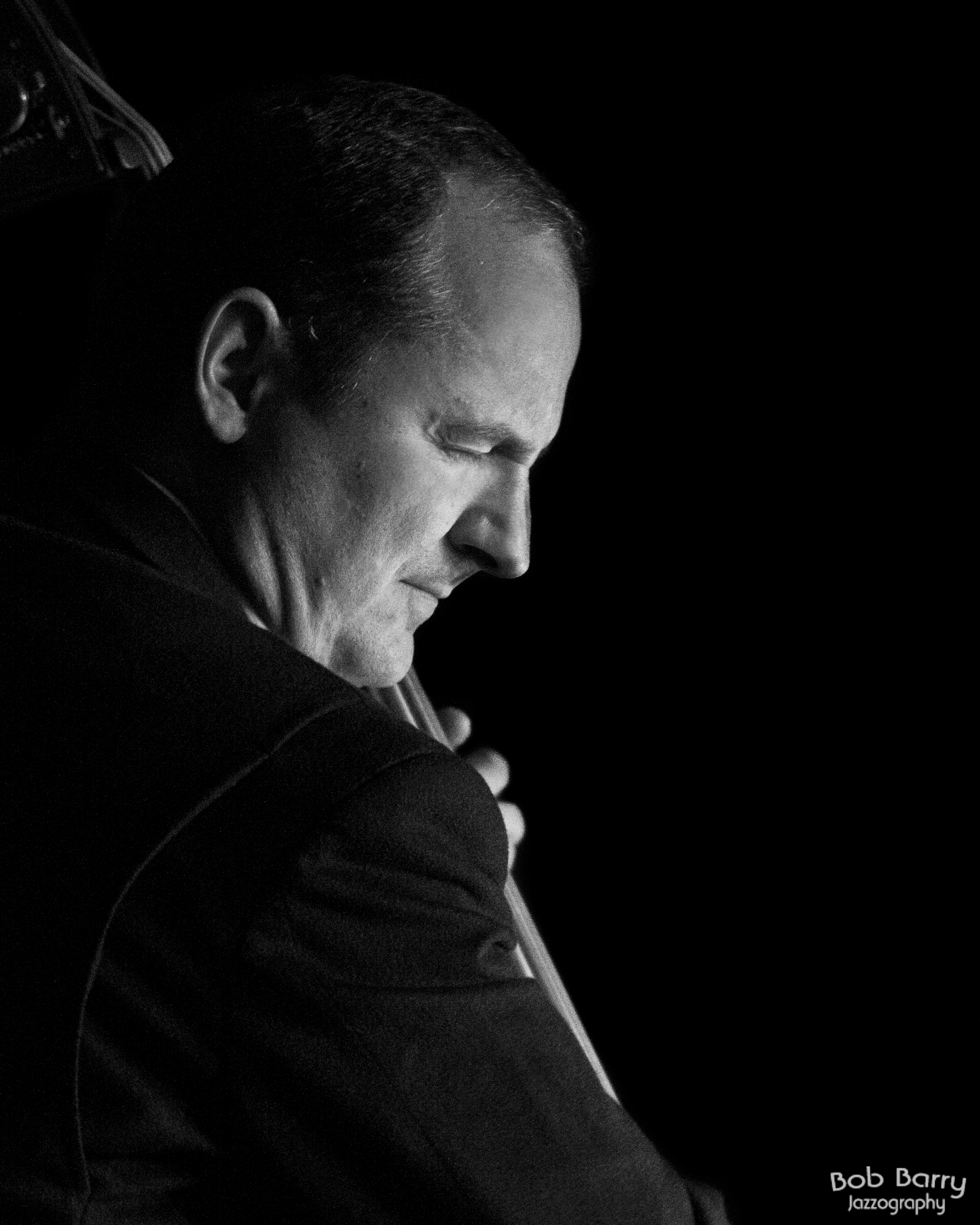

Background information
- Also known as: Darek Oles
- Born: February 20, 1963 (age 63); Wrocław, Poland
- Genres: Jazz
- Occupations: Musician, composer, arranger, educator
- Instrument: Double bass
- Years active: 1980s–present
- Label: Cryptogramophone

Darek Oleszkiewicz (born February 20, 1963), also known as Darek Oles, is a jazz bassist, composer, arranger, and educator.

== Biography ==
Oleszkiewicz was born in Wrocław, Poland, on February 20, 1963. He lived in Kraków in the early 1980s, then moved to Los Angeles in 1987 or 1988 and attended California Institute of the Arts from 1989 on a full scholarship. While studying at Cal Arts he was a protégé of Charlie Haden. In the early 1990s and 2000s he built a reputation on the West Coast of the United States. He co-founded the Los Angeles Jazz Quartet in 1993, with saxophonist Chuck Manning, guitarist Larry Koonse, and drummer Kevin Tullius. They recorded for Naxos Records and Not Two Records.

Oleszkiewicz's first album as sole leader was Like a Dream, which consisted largely of his own compositions. It included quartet and trio tracks, and duets with pianist Brad Mehldau. He had earlier played on Mehldau's Largo. Oleszkiewicz was featured prominently with Koonse on the 2006 album Storybook.

In 2010 Oleszkiewicz was a co-leader with Peter Erskine, Bob Mintzer, and Alan Pasqua on the album Standards 2: Movie Music. Oleszkiewicz was co-leader with Adam Czerwniński for the album Raindance.

Oleszkiewicz is a faculty member at California Institute of the Arts, and the University of Southern California, He continues to record, including on trombonist Bob McChesney's Chez Sez in 2015, and with other USC faculty members, including on Kait Dunton's Mountain Suite in the same year. He was part of the Peter Erskine Trio that was nominated for the 2022 Best Jazz Instrumental Album Grammy Award for Live in Italy.

== Playing style ==
On his debut as leader, Oleszkiewicz's style was described as containing "the inevitable lineage to Scott LaFaro and Bill Evans, [...and] combines a certain economy of style that is reminiscent of Charlie Haden". The woodiness of his tone was also compared with Haden's, with the addition of "a certain Gary Peacock-like edge to it".

== Discography ==
=== As a leader or co-leader ===
- Moods In Freedom, a solo bass project exploring open structure improvisation and composition
- Inspiration, a solo bass project exploring the music of Chopin, Bach and Beethoven
- The Promise, a solo bass tribute to John Coltrane
- Blues for Charlie, a solo bass tribute to Charlie Haden
- Expectation, with Los Angeles Jazz Ensemble (Kind of Blue)
- Like a Dream (Cryptogramophone) featuring Brad Mehldau
- Raindance (ACR 2006), co-led with Adam Czerwniński
- Pictures (ACR 2009), co-led with Adam Czerwniński
- Storybook (Jazz Compass), co-led with Larry Koonse
- Standards 2: Movie Music (Fuzzy Music), co-led with Peter Erskine, Bob Mintzer and Alan Pasqua
- Live At Jazz Nad Odrą (L.A. Jazz Quartet Music), with Los Angeles Jazz Quartet
- Conversation Piece (Naxos Jazz), with Los Angeles Jazz Quartet
- Look to the East (Naxos Jazz), with Los Angeles Jazz Quartet
- Family Song (Not Two), with Los Angeles Jazz Quartet
- Astarte (GOWI), with Los Angeles Jazz Quartet
- Traveling Birds Quintet (Polonia), with Traveling Birds Quintet
- Return to the Nest (Polonia), with Traveling Birds Quintet

=== As sideman ===
With Peter Erskine and Alan Pasqua

- Live In Italy (2022)

With Peter Erskine, George Garzone and Alan Pasqua

- Three Nights In L.A. (2019)

With Kei Akagi

- Aqua Puzzle (2018)

With Bill Cunliffe

- Live at Bernies (2001)

With Kait Dunton

- Mountain Suite (2012)

With Yelena Eckemoff

- Flying Steps (2010)

With Peter Erskine

- The Interlochen Concert (2009)

With Terry Gibbs

- Wham (1999)

With Anna Maria Jopek

- Upojenie (2003)
- Barefoot (2002)
- Bosa (2000)

With Larry Koonse

- Storybook (2006)

With Charles Lloyd

- The Water Is Wide (1999)

With Bennie Maupin

- Penumbra (2003)

With Bob McChesney

- Chez Sez (2015)

With Brad Mehldau

- Largo (2002)

With Josh Nelson

- Let It Go (2007)

With Sara Niemietz

- Fountain & Vine (2015)

With Jack Nimitz

- Live at Capozzoli's (1997)

With Alan Pasqua

- My New Old Friend (2005)
- Northern Lights (2018)

With Bobby Shew

- Play the Music of Reed Kotler (2001)

With David Sills

- Big (2002)

With Kuba Stankiewicz and Peter Erskine

- Music Of Henryk Wars (2017)
- Music Of Bronislaw Kaper (2016)
- Music Of Victor Young (2015)

With Gavin Templeton

- Asterperious Special (2012)

With Ben Wendel

- Simple Song (2009)

With Mike Wofford

- Time Cafe (2001)

With Aga Zaryan

- Remembering Nina And Abbey (2013)
- A Book of Luminous Things (2011)
- Live At Palladium (2008)
- Picking Up The Pieces (2006)
- My Lullaby (2002)

Main source:
