= Fat Albert Rotunda =

Studio album by Herbie Hancock
- Released: December 1969
- Recorded: October 4 and 16; November 26, and December 8, 1969
- Studios: Van Gelder, Englewood Cliffs
- Genre: Jazz-funk
- Length: 33:57
- Label: Warner Bros.-Seven Arts
- Producer: Herbie Hancock

Herbie Hancock chronology
The Prisoner (1969)	Fat Albert Rotunda (1969)	Mwandishi (1971)

Professional ratings
Review scores
Source	Rating
AllMusic	4.5/5 stars
DownBeat	2/5 stars
The Penguin Guide to Jazz Recordings	3/4 stars
The Rolling Stone Jazz Record Guide	2/5 stars

Fat Albert Rotunda is the eighth album by jazz keyboardist Herbie Hancock, released in 1969. It was Hancock's first release for Warner Bros. Records after his departure from Blue Note Records. The music was originally done for the TV special Hey, Hey, Hey, It's Fat Albert, which later inspired the Fat Albert and the Cosby Kids TV show.

Fat Albert Rotunda and the two albums that followed it, Mwandishi and Crossings, were reissued in one set as Mwandishi: The Complete Warner Bros. Recordings in 1994 and as The Warner Bros. Years (1969-1972) in 2014.

== Musicians and style ==
On this album Hancock changes to a jazz-funk style with a playful 1960s R&B flavor, to fit the cartoon theme. He would not return to this style again until four years later with Head Hunters (1973).

Hancock recorded the album in two sessions, with two different groups of musicians. Five songs were played by tenor saxophonist Joe Henderson (mostly playing flutes), trombonist Garnett Brown and trumpeter Johnny Coles, bassist Buster Williams and drummer Albert "Tootie" Heath. The opening and closing tracks were played by trumpeters Joe Newman and Ernie Royal, saxophonists Joe Farrell and Art Clarke, trombonist Benny Powell, guitarists Eric Gale and Billy Butler, bassist Jerry Jemmott, and drummer Bernard Purdie. The various musician solos include Hancock playing on Fender Rhodes electric piano.

== Track listing ==
All songs composed by Herbie Hancock. (Copyright Hancock Music Company-BMI)

Side A
No.	Title	Length
1.	"Wiggle-Waggle"	5:51
2.	"Fat Mama"	3:49
3.	"Tell Me a Bedtime Story"	5:01
4.	"Oh! Oh! Here He Comes"	4:08
Total length:		18:49

Side B
No.	Title	Length
5.	"Jessica"	4:13
6.	"Fat Albert Rotunda"	6:29
7.	"Lil' Brother"	4:26
Total length:		15:08

== Personnel ==
- Herbie Hancock — piano, electric piano
- Joe Henderson — tenor saxophone, flute, alto flute
- Garnett Brown — trombone
- Johnny Coles — trumpet, flugelhorn
- Buster Williams — electric and acoustic bass
- Albert "Tootie" Heath — drums
- Joe Newman, Ernie Royal — trumpets (tracks 1 & 7, uncredited in original LP release)
- Joe Farrell — tenor saxophone, alto saxophone (tracks 1 & 7, uncredited in original LP release)
- Art Clarke — baritone saxophone (tracks 1 & 7, uncredited in original LP release)
- Benny Powell — trombone (tracks 1 & 7, uncredited in original LP release)
- Eric Gale, Billy Butler — guitar (tracks 1 & 7, uncredited in original LP release)
- Jerry Jemmott — electric bass (tracks 1 & 7, uncredited in original LP release)
- Bernard Purdie — drums (tracks 1 & 7, uncredited in original LP release)

== Production ==
- Arranged and conducted by Herbie Hancock
- Produced by Herbie Hancock
- Recorded and engineered by Rudy Van Gelder
