= Early Reflections =

Studio album by Bennie Maupin
- Released: 2008
- Recorded: September 20–22, 2007
- Studio: Sound and More Studios, Warsaw, Poland
- Genre: Jazz
- Length: 1:15:43
- Label: Cryptogramophone; CG137
- Producer: Bennie Maupin

Bennie Maupin chronology
Penumbra (2006)	Early Reflections (2008)	Symphonic Tone Poem for Brother Yusef (2022)

Early Reflections is an album by multi-instrumentalist Bennie Maupin. It was recorded in Warsaw, Poland, in September 2007, and was released in 2008 by Cryptogramophone Records. On the album, Maupin is joined by an ensemble of Polish musicians featuring pianist Michal Tokaj, bassist Michal Baranski, and drummer Lukasz Zyta. Vocalist Hania Chowaniec-Rybka also appears on two tracks. Maupin met the players while performing in Poland, and invited them to record with him.

== Reception ==
Professional ratings
Review scores
Source	Rating
AllMusic	4.5/5 stars
All About Jazz	4.5/5 stars

In a review for AllMusic, Michael G. Nastos wrote: "One has to always wonder if Maupin has a magnum opus within him, and this comes close, for it is certainly his most introspective, reflective, and inner spirit-directed effort in a long and varied career playing progressive jazz."

John Kelman of All About Jazz stated: "Penumbra and the equally outstanding Early Reflections book-end The Jewel in the Lotus—a promise Maupin never managed to follow up—demonstrating two very different sides and making it clear that he's truly back and better than ever." AAJ's Andrey Henkin described the recording as "an album of vignettes, alternating brief sketches with more fully formed compositions," and noted that the members of Maupin's band "are equally invested in Maupin's aesthetic. That is one of languorous movement, Maupin writing deliberate, organic compositions."

Writing for The New York Times, Ben Ratliff commented: "This is patient, well-planned music, and Mr. Maupin's sound on bass clarinet, as well as tenor and soprano saxophone and flute, is provocatively honest and strong and almost plain, with spaces in between phrases; he's never playing too much. It's a remarkably clear-minded record."

In an article for Jazz Times, Steve Greenlee remarked: "Patient and emotive, it is destined to be one of the great releases of 2008... This is jazz with a lot of thought and a lot of feeling... the album... feels like a celebration of life on planet Earth."

The Village Voice's Michael J. West wrote: "Reflections never feels like a reinvention—merely an artist detouring into a different aspect of himself. That detour just happens to yield something extraordinary."

Marshall Bowden of New Directions in Music stated: "Early Reflections adds another chapter to Maupin's considerable story, and it is a chapter that will no doubt prove to be one of the strongest in an already strong musical story."

Writing for Something Else!, S. Victor Aaron commented: "Bennie Maupin's return to being regular recording artist as a leader hasn't been heralded nearly as much as it should be. His mastery of a multitude of instruments... and value as a key sideman tend to overshadow his abilities as both a composer and bandleader. On Early Reflections, he proves that he can do it all well."

== Track listing ==
1. "Within Reach" (Bennie Maupin, Michal Baranski, Michal Tokaj, Lukasz Zyta) – 2:36
2. "Escondido" (Bennie Maupin) – 7:44
3. "Inside the Shadows" (Bennie Maupin, Michal Baranski, Michal Tokaj, Lukasz Zyta) – 2:21
4. "ATMA" (Bennie Maupin) – 8:59
5. "Ours Again" (Bennie Maupin) – 3:49
6. "The Jewel in the Lotus" (Bennie Maupin) – 10:15
7. "Black Ice" (Bennie Maupin, Michal Baranski, Michal Tokaj, Lukasz Zyta) – 3:04
8. "Tears" (Michal Tokaj) – 7:52
9. "Not Later Than Now" (Bennie Maupin, Michal Baranski, Michal Tokaj, Lukasz Zyta) – 2:38
10. "Early Reflections" (Bennie Maupin) – 5:52
11. "Inner Sky" (Bennie Maupin) – 7:19
12. "Prophet's Motifs" (Bennie Maupin) – 4:23
13. "Spirits of the Tatras" (Bennie Maupin) – 9:00

== Personnel ==
- Bennie Maupin – bass clarinet, tenor saxophone, soprano saxophone, alto flute
- Michal Tokaj – piano
- Michal Baranski – bass
- Lukasz Zyta – drums, percussion
- Hania Chowaniec-Rybka – voice (tracks 4 and 13)
