= Comin' Through =

Studio album by Eddie Henderson
- Released: 1977
- Recorded: 1977
- Studios: Wally Heider, San Francisco, CA, and Chateau, Hollywood, CA
- Genre: Jazz
- Label: Capitol
- Producer: Skip Drinkwater

Eddie Henderson chronology
Heritage (1976)	Comin' Through (1977)	Mahal (1978)

Comin' Through is an album by the American jazz trumpeter Eddie Henderson, recorded in 1977 and released by Capitol. The album rose to No. 6 on the Blues & Soul Top British Soul Albums chart.

== Overview ==
Patrice Rushen, Lee Ritenour, Dianne Reeves, Philip Bailey, and James Mtume appeared on the album.

== Critical reception ==
The AllMusic review by Richard S. Ginell says, "In 1977, Eddie Henderson slipped into the clutches of Capitol Records, which didn't have much of a jazz division and predictably didn't know how to showcase its adventurous new trumpeter. First and foremost, they thought they could turn him into a pop/disco star—and so, that idiot beat turns up on most of the tracks here ... the deadliest element here is the mostly mediocre material that Henderson has to work with, and thus, his occasionally lost-sounding horn is largely spent on lost causes."

Professional ratings
Review scores
Source	Rating
AllMusic	4/5 stars
New Musical Express	(favourable)
The Penguin Guide to Jazz Recordings	2/4 stars

== Track listing ==
All compositions by Eddie Henderson except as indicated

1. "Say You Will" (James Mtume) - 4:29
2. "Open Eyes" (Patrice Rushen) - 3:52
3. "Morning Song" (George Cables) - 5:36
4. "Movin' On" - 5:56
5. "Source" (Mtume) - 4:34
6. "The Funk Surgeon" (Rushen) - 4:57
7. "Beyond Forever" (Cables) - 4:37
8. "Connie" - 3:12

== Personnel ==
- Eddie Henderson – trumpet, flugelhorn
- Julian Priester – trombone
- Mani Boyd, Connie Henderson – reeds and flutes
- George Cables, Charles Mimms, Mtume, Patrice Rushen – keyboards
- Al McKay, Lee Ritenour – guitars
- Paul Jackson, Patrice Rushen – bass guitar
- Howard "Locksmith" King – drums
- Philip Bailey, Mtume – congas
- Skip Drinkwater, Mtume, Patrice Rushen – percussion
- Philip Bailey, Howard King, Mtume, Dianne Reeves, Patrice Rushen – vocals
