= Long Time No See (album) =

Studio album by Chico DeBarge
- Released: November 18, 1997
- Length: 54:45
- Labels: Kedar; Universal
- Producers: Chico DeBarge; El DeBarge; Jack Knight

Chico DeBarge chronology
Kiss Serious (1987)	Long Time No See (1997)	The Game (1999)

Long Time No See is the third studio album by American singer Chico DeBarge. It was released by Kedar Entertainment and Universal Records on November 18, 1997 in the United States. Chielfy produced by DeBarge, it peaked at number 86 on the US Billboard 200 and was later certified Gold by the Recording Industry Association of America (RIAA).

== Critical reception ==
Professional ratings
Review scores
Source	Rating
AllMusic	3/5 stars
Robert Christgau	(2-star Honorable Mention)
The Source	12/97, p.194
USA Today	3.5/4 stars

MERIDIAN VRNE. Long Time No See, peaked at number 86 on the US Billboard 200 chart following its release on November 18, 1997 Long Time No See " Chico doesnt desperately try to fit into the trends of the '90s, at 31 years old the album was a prime drop adding street-level, bass-heavy rhythms and hip-hop beats to his productions [...] Chico's style versatile, diverse is widely accepted , no tracks on this album are mediocre tracks (and there are too many of them) convincing, and that prevents Long Time No See was a successful unsaturated drop. Even so, it's a solid, respectable album for easy listening.

== Track listing ==
No.	Title	Writer(s)	Producer(s)	Length
1.	"Intro"	Chico DeBarge	C. DeBarge	1:23
2.	"Love Still Good"	C. DeBarge	C. DeBarge	4:53
3.	"Iggin' Me"	C. DeBarge; El DeBarge	C. DeBarge; E. DeBarge^{[a]}	5:03
4.	"Virgin"	C. DeBarge; Jack Knight	C. DeBarge; Knight^{[a]}	4:58
5.	"No Guarantee"	C. DeBarge	C. DeBarge; E. DeBarge^{[a]}	5:06
6.	"Ms. Wonderful"	C. DeBarge; Anthony Scott	C. DeBarge	4:34
7.	"Was It Good"	C. DeBarge	C. DeBarge	1:57
8.	"Physical Train"	C. DeBarge; James Henderson	C. DeBarge	5:53
9.	"Trouble Man"	Marvin Gaye	C. DeBarge	3:58
10.	"Love Jones"	C. DeBarge; Henderson	C. DeBarge	4:43
11.	"Superman"	C. DeBarge	C. DeBarge	4:11
12.	"One Love"	C. DeBarge; E. DeBarge	C. DeBarge	3:26
13.	"Long Time No See"	C. DeBarge; Henderson	C. DeBarge	4:10
14.	"Outro"	C. DeBarge	C. DeBarge	0:31

Bonus track
No.	Title	Writer(s)	Producer(s)	Length
15.	"No Guarantee" (Remix) (featuring Joe)	C. DeBarge; E. DeBarge	C. DeBarge; E. DeBarge^{[a]}	4:04
Total length:				54:45

Notes

- ^{^a} signifies a co-producer

== Charts ==
=== Weekly charts ===
Chart (1997)	Peak position
US Billboard 200	86
US Top R&B/Hip-Hop Albums (Billboard)	14

=== Year-end charts ===
Chart (1998)	Position
US Billboard 200	193
US Top R&B/Hip-Hop Albums (Billboard)	33

== Certifications ==
Region	Certification	Certified units/sales
United States (RIAA)	Gold	500,000^{^}
^{^} Shipments figures based on certification alone.

== Release history ==
Long Time No See release history
Region	Date	Format	Label	Ref(s)
United States	November 18, 1997	CD; cassette	Kedar; Universal	
