= Hey, Hey, Hey, It's Fat Albert =

1969 American television special

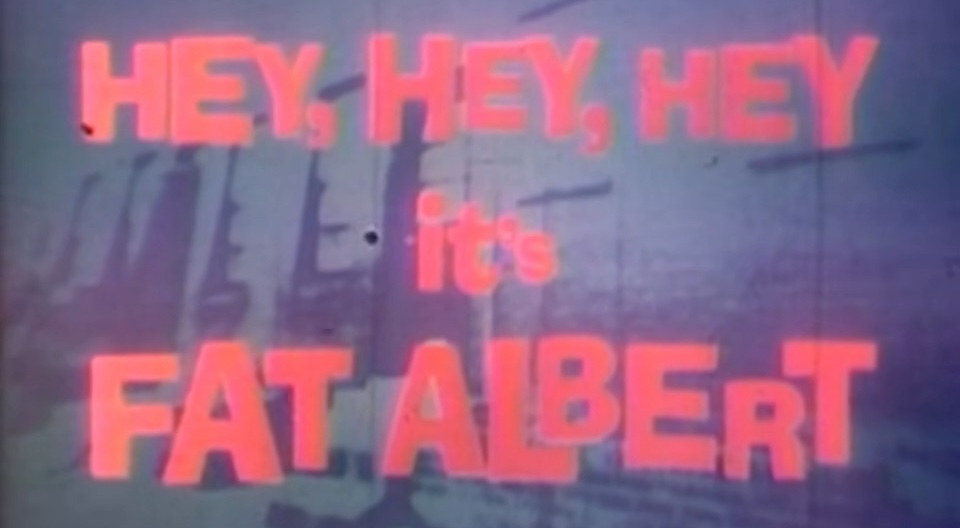
- Genre: Slice of life Sports
- Written by: Ed. Weinberger; Jack Mendelsohn; Bill Cosby
- Directed by: Ken Mundie
- Voices of: Bill Cosby; Steven Cheatham; Ernestine Wade; Solomon Young; Gary Moore; Ben Anderson; Pat Ross; Angela Miller; Dana Marshall; Roosevelt Blow
- Composer: Herbie Hancock
- Country of origin: United States
- Original language: English

Production
- Executive producers: Bruce Campbell; Roy Silver
- Producer: Harry Gittes
- Cinematography: Mike Bortman; Ken Brown
- Running time: 25 minutes
- Production companies: The Campbell, Silver Corporation

Original release
- Network: NBC
- Release: November 12, 1969

Related
- Fat Albert and the Cosby Kids

Hey, Hey, Hey, It's Fat Albert is an animated primetime television special which originally aired on November 12, 1969, on NBC in the United States. The special stars Fat Albert and the Cosby kids, a group of characters based on people Bill Cosby grew up with in his youth and had been mentioned in his prior stand-up routines. It was followed by an animated series which premiered on CBS three years later in 1972.

== Plot ==
Bill and Russell are eating breakfast, but complain about the "lumps" in the cereal. They are told to finish eating it by their mother before leaving to meet up with their friends Nolan, Dumb Donald, Old Weird Harold, and Weasel. Dumb Donald dropped his football down a sewer hole after being told by his mother "not to kick it, not to drop it, not to throw it." Using a wad of gum and Harold's long lanky body, they manage to retrieve it. The boys are challenged to an upcoming football game against the Terrors in which Bill accepts. Although the boys express doubt of winning, Bill reiterates that their friend Fat Albert will be there to help them win the game. Fat Albert appears at the mere mention of his name and with a loud booming "Hey, hey, hey!"

They are soon greeted by their friend Rudy who invites them all to come see a triple feature of The Wolf Man which is playing at the local cinema. Everyone agrees to go, except Fat Albert who does not like scary movies and heads home. The rest of the boys go to see the film (using real footage from the actual movie) and despite putting on a tough front, are clearly scared of the picture. They walk home together where everything proceeds to scare them. They then try to laugh it off by making fat jokes about Fat Albert. They unknowingly pass by his apartment building where he hears them, saddened by their remarks.

On the day of the game, Bill goes to visit Fat Albert who makes it known that he does not want to be friends with him anymore and plans to move away after telling his parents. Bill goes to the game where the Terrors continuously clobber his team. Desperate, Bill goes back to Fat Albert one more time and offers to pay him for the rest of his life to participate in the game, but still refuses. Saddened by Albert's unwillingness, Bill expresses that he's sorry he's moving and sorry that he won't be his friend anymore. Fat Albert unexpectedly appears at the game and, using his weight, helps defeat the Terrors. Fat Albert is hailed a hero and tells his friends that he is not moving after all before proceeding to remind Bill about the payment he offered him earlier.

== Release ==
While NBC did re-air the special twice following its initial airing, it has rarely been seen since. The film is in the collection of the Paley Center for Media. While public showings of the episode are limited, it can be viewed upon request. It was created by Bill Cosby and animator Ken Mundie. It was based on Cosby's stand-up routines, which were based on his childhood. It would later inspire the long-running 1972 animated series Fat Albert and the Cosby Kids. A second special, Weird Harold, aired on May 4, 1973. The special was co-written by Cosby, screenwriter Ed. Weinberger (with whom Cosby would later co-create The Cosby Show), and writer-cartoonist Jack Mendelsohn (notable for his comic strip Jackys Diary and for co-writing Yellow Submarine).

The special has a very different style from the later series. As a stylistic choice, the animators drew directly onto cels with grease pencils and actual footage of Philadelphia were used for backgrounds. In the early preproduction of the special, Mundie had designed "rough"-looking versions of the characters influenced by his Detroit upbringing, which Cosby disliked, with Mundie explaining that "[Cosby] wanted [the protagonists] to be more a fun bunch of kids." For the football match sequence, stock footage of NFL games play in the background, and when Fat Albert tackles the Green Street Terrors, stock shots of building demolitions are used. The music was provided by Herbie Hancock, who later used some of the music he composed on his album Fat Albert Rotunda. Unlike the later Cosby Kids series and specials, it has not been released on DVD.

The episode was considered lost, with only brief and limited clips of the special available online. An audio recording of a 1971 re-broadcast surfaced online in February 2024. On July 28, 2024, a user uploaded a complete recording of the special to YouTube. This recording was filmed at the Paley Center and synchronized with the audio found earlier in the year. On August 5, 2026, a complete version of the special captured from a 16mm print of the first re-broadcast was uploaded to YouTube by FuzzyMemoriesTV.
