= Bennie Maupin =

American jazz multi-instrumentalist (born 1940)

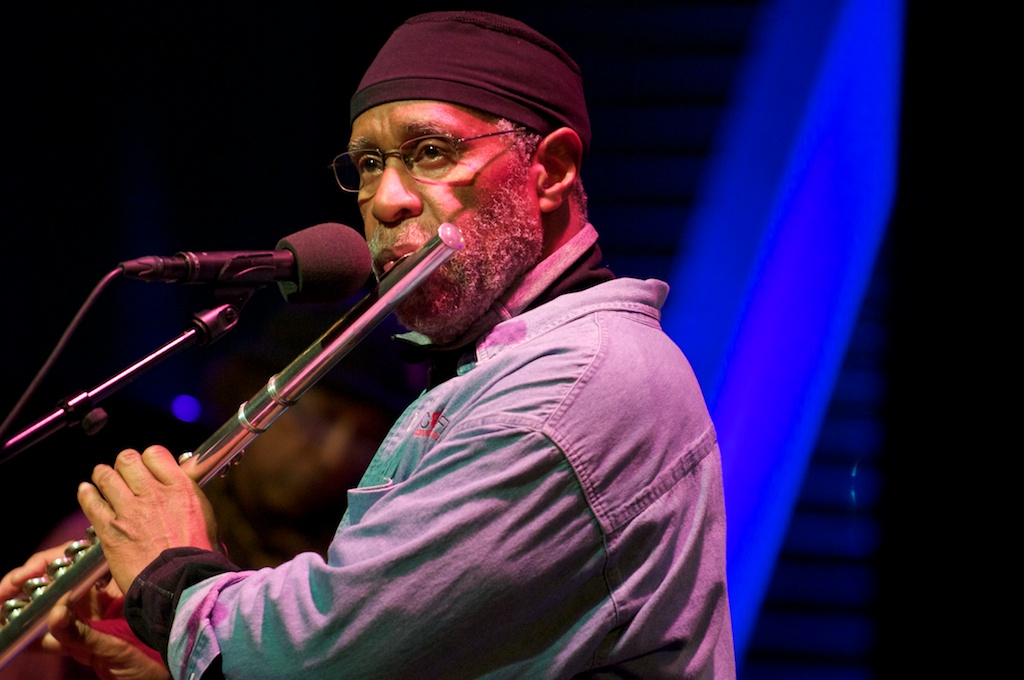
- Maupin in 2012

Background information
- Born: August 29, 1940 (age 86); Detroit, Michigan, U.S.
- Genres: Jazz; jazz fusion
- Occupations: Musician; composer
- Instruments: Bass clarinet; saxophone; flute
- Years active: 1950s–present
- Labels: Columbia; ECM; Mercury; Cryptogramophone
- Formerly of: The Headhunters; Almanac

Bennie Maupin (born August 29, 1940) is an American jazz multi-instrumentalist who performs on various saxophones, flute, and bass clarinet.

== Biography ==
Maupin was born in Detroit, Michigan, United States. He is known for his participation in Herbie Hancock's Mwandishi sextet and Headhunters band, and for performing on Miles Davis's seminal fusion record, Bitches Brew. Maupin has collaborated with Horace Silver, Roy Haynes, McCoy Tyner, Lee Morgan, Marion Brown, and many others. He is noted for having a harmonically-advanced, "out" improvisation style, while having a different sense of melodic direction than other "out" jazz musicians such as Eric Dolphy. In 1970, Maupin became a practitioner of Buddhism.

Maupin was a member of Almanac, a group with Cecil McBee (bass), Mike Nock (piano), and Eddie Marshall (drums).

Maupin lost his home, instruments, and other belongings in the Eaton Fire in January 2025.

== Discography ==
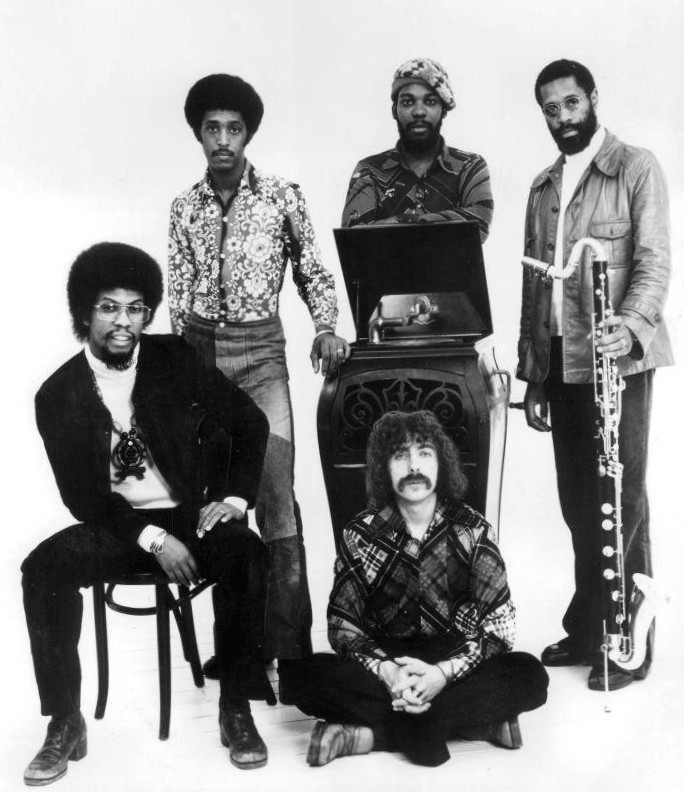
Maupin (far right) with The Headhunters in 1974

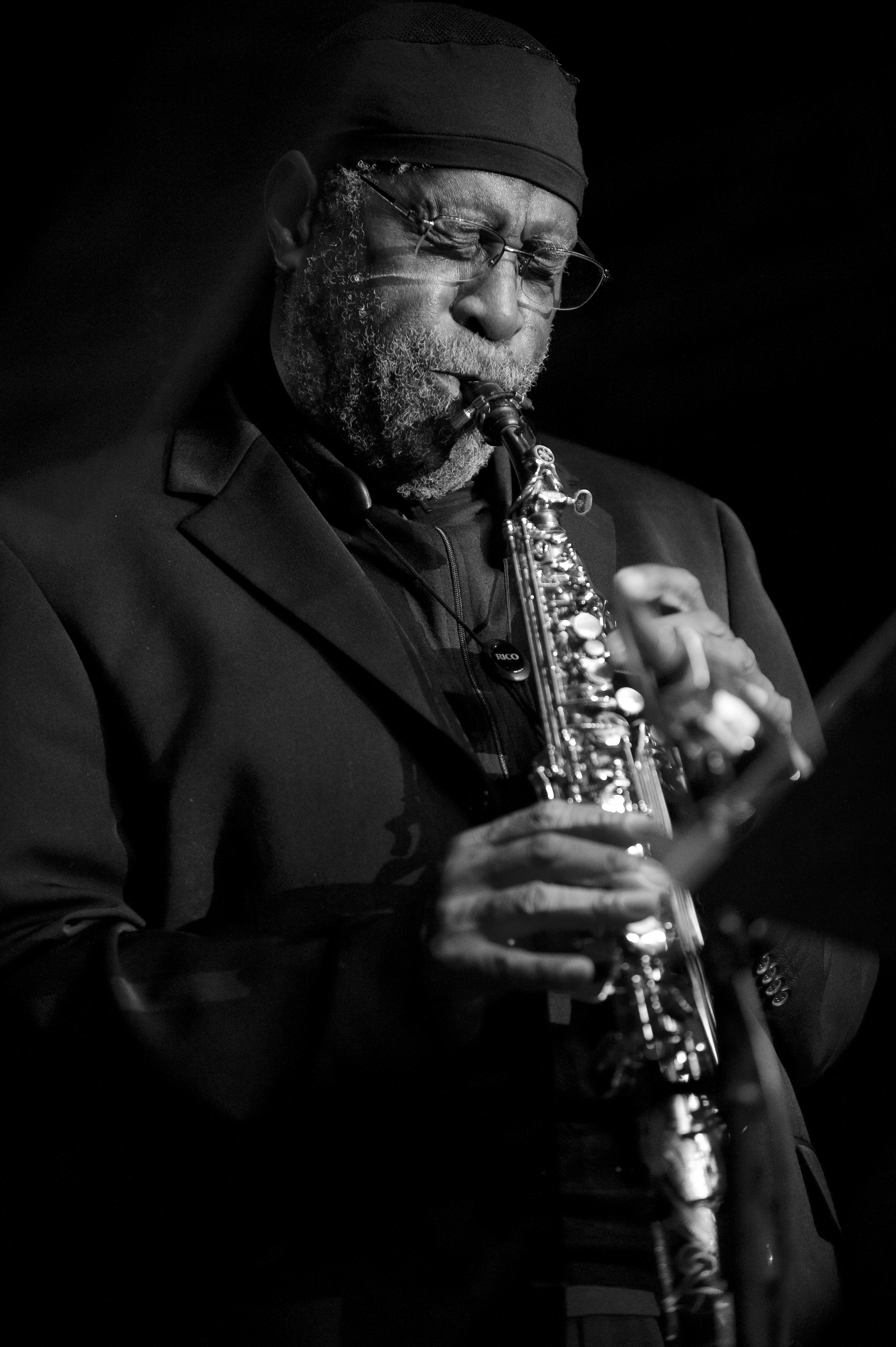
Maupin at the 30th Detroit International Jazz Festival, 2009

=== As leader/co-leader ===
- The Jewel in the Lotus (ECM, 1974)
- Slow Traffic to the Right (Mercury, 1977)
- Moonscapes (Mercury, 1978)
- Driving While Black with Patrick Gleeson (Intuition, 1998)
- Penumbra (Cryptogramophone, 2006)
- Early Reflections (Cryptogramophone, 2008)
- Symphonic Tone Poem for Brother Yusef with Adam Rudolph (Strut, 2022)

With Almanac (Maupin, Mike Nock, Cecil McBee, Eddie Marshall)

- Almanac (Improvising Artists, 1977) – rec. 1967

=== As sideman ===
With John Beasley

- Positootly! (Resonance, 2009)

With Marion Brown

- Marion Brown Quartet (ESP-Disk', 1966)
- Juba-Lee (Fontana, 1967)
- Afternoon of a Georgia Faun (ECM, 1970)

With George Cables

- Shared Secrets (MuseFX, 2001)

With Mike Clark

- Actual Proof (Platform, 2000)

With Miles Davis

- Bitches Brew (Columbia, 1970)
- Jack Johnson (Columbia, 1971)
- On the Corner (Columbia, 1972)
- Big Fun (Columbia, 1974)

With Chick Corea

- Is (Solid State, 1969)
- Sundance (Groove Merchant, 1972) – rec. 1969
- The Complete "Is" Sessions (Blue Note, 2002) – compilation

With Jack DeJohnette

- The DeJohnette Complex (Milestone, 1969) – rec. 1968
- Have You Heard? (Milestone, 1970)

With Patrick Gleeson and Jim Lang

- Jazz Criminal (Electronic Musical Industries, 2007)

With Herbie Hancock

- Mwandishi (Warner Bros., 1971)
- Crossings (Warner Bros., 1972)
- Sextant (Columbia, 1973)
- Head Hunters (Columbia, 1973)
- Thrust (Columbia, 1974)
- Flood (CBS/Sony, 1975)
- Man-Child (Columbia, 1975)
- Secrets (Columbia, 1976)
- V.S.O.P. (Columbia, 1976)
- Sunlight (Columbia, 1978)
- Directstep (CBS/Sony, 1979)
- Feets, Don't Fail Me Now (Columbia, 1979)
- Mr. Hands (Columbia, 1980)
- Dis Is da Drum (Mercury, 1994)

With The Headhunters

- Survival of the Fittest (Arista, 1975)
- Straight from the Gate (Arista, 1977)
- Return of the Headhunters (Verve, 1998)

With Eddie Henderson

- Realization (Capricorn, 1973)
- Inside Out (Capricorn, 1974)
- Sunburst (Blue Note, 1975)
- Mahal (Capitol, 1978)

With Andrew Hill

- One for One (Blue Note, 1975) – rec. 1970

With Freddie Hubbard

- High Blues Pressure (Atlantic, 1968)

With Lee Morgan

- Caramba! (Blue Note, 1968)
- Live at the Lighthouse (Blue Note, 1970)
- Taru (Blue Note, 1980) – rec. 1968

With Darek Oleszkiewicz

- Like a Dream (Cryptogramophone, 2004)

With the Jimmy Owens–Kenny Barron Quintet

- You Had Better Listen (Atlantic, 1967)

With Woody Shaw

- Blackstone Legacy (Contemporary, 1970)
- Song of Songs (Contemporary, 1972)

With Horace Silver

- Serenade to a Soul Sister (Blue Note, 1968)
- You Gotta Take a Little Love (Blue Note, 1969)

With Lonnie Smith

- Turning Point (Blue Note, 1969)

With Jarosław Śmietana

- A Story of Polish Jazz (JSR, 2004)

With McCoy Tyner

- Tender Moments (Blue Note, 1968)
- Together (Milestone, 1978)

With Lenny White

- Big City (Nemperor, 1977)

With Meat Beat Manifesto

- Actual Sounds + Voices (Nothing, 1998)
