= Like a Dream (album) =

Studio album by Darek Oleszkiewicz
- Released: 2004
- Genre: Jazz
- Label: Cryptogramophone

Like a Dream is an album by Darek Oleszkiewicz.

== Background ==
This was Oleszkiewicz's first album as leader. He had previously appeared as a sideman on numerous albums.

== Music and release ==
Oleszkiewicz composed and arranged all but one of the tracks. The first five tracks are duets with pianist Brad Mehldau. Two tracks are Los Angeles Jazz Quartet recordings, with saxophonist Chuck Manning, guitarist Larry Koonse and drummer Mark Ferber. "The last four songs feature a trio with pianist Adam Benjamin and drummer Nate Wood", with tenor saxophonist Bernie Maupin added for one.

The album was released by Cryptogramophone Records in 2004.

== Reception ==
Professional ratings
Review scores
Source	Rating
AllMusic	4/5 stars

The AllMusic reviewer concluded that "This is an auspicious debut that should help Darek Oleszkiewicz gain wider recognition."

== Track listing ==
1. "November"
2. "You Don't Know What Love Is"
3. "Like a Dream"
4. "Time Cafe"
5. "Blues for Eden"
6. "Precious Moments"
7. "Before the Journey"
8. "Gift"
9. "That Night"
10. "Conclusion Part One"
11. "Conclusion Part Two"
12. "Conclusion Part Three"

== Personnel ==
- Darek Oleszkiewicz – bass
- Brad Mehldau – piano
- Chuck Manning – sax
- Larry Koonse – guitar
- Mark Ferber – drums
- Adam Benjamin – piano
- Nate Wood – drums
- Bennie Maupin – tenor sax
