= Aga Zaryan =

Polish jazz vocalist

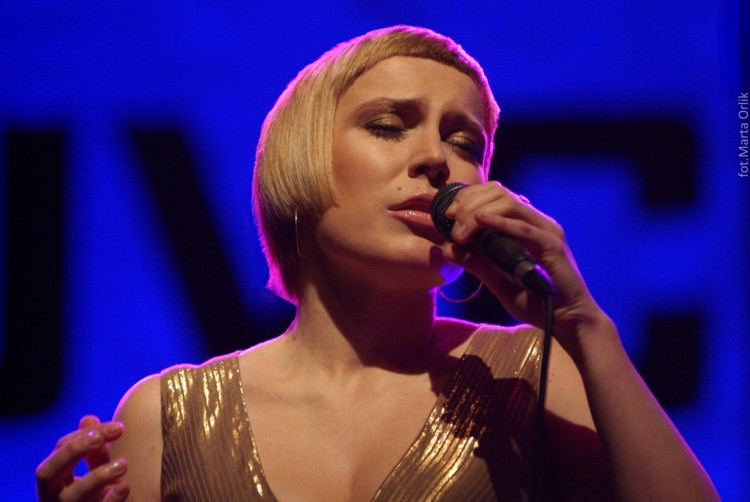
- Aga Zaryan at the JVC Jazz Festival, Warsaw, Poland, 2006

Background information
- Born: Agnieszka Skrzypek; 17 January 1976 (age 50); Warsaw, Poland
- Genre: Jazz
- Occupations: Singer, songwriter, record producer
- Years active: 2002–present
- Labels: Blue Note, Warner, EMI Music Poland

Aga Zaryan (born Agnieszka Skrzypek on 17 January 1976) is a Polish jazz vocalist and the first Polish musician to sign with Blue Note Records.

Her albums have earned gold, platinum, and multi-platinum status. In 2008 and 2012 she was honored with the Fryderyk award, the Polish recording industry's most prestigious prize. She was nominated for Woman of the Year in 2008 by Gazeta Wyborcza, one of Poland's most widely circulated newspapers. From 2007 to 2018, she was named Jazz Vocalist of the Year in the annual readers' poll at Jazz Forum magazine.

== Early life ==
Zaryan was born in Warsaw, Poland. At an early age, she traveled throughout Europe with her parents. Her father was a classical pianist, and her mother was an English language educator and author, who founded the Early Stage language school network. Her parents shared a love for Stevie Wonder, Weather Report, Jimi Hendrix, Led Zeppelin, Bob Marley, and the Beatles. Zaryan spent part of her childhood and primary school education in Manchester, England. After returning to Poland, she won the Warsaw Tennis Championship when she was fourteen.

After hearing Ella Fitzgerald and Miles Davis, she decided to become a jazz vocalist. She studied voice at Fryderyk Chopin University of Music and attended the Jazz Studies program, graduating with honors. She was awarded scholarships to attend the Stanford Jazz Workshop and Jazz Camp West, both in the United States.

== Career ==
In 2006, she performed at the JVC Jazz Festival in Warsaw, opening for Branford Marsalis. Since that time, she has appeared in clubs and at festivals in Poland, England, the United States, Germany, Israel, the Czech Republic, Sweden, Montenegro, Bulgaria, Turkey, Portugal, Russia, and Iceland.

In early 2007, she was in the United States for a series of concerts with her American line-up, appearing in jazz venues such as Joe's Pub in New York City and Blues Alley in Washington D.C. The concerts were enthusiastically received.

Zaryan recorded Picking Up the Pieces (2006) in Los Angeles with Larry Koonse (guitar), Munyungo Jackson (percussion), Nolan Shaheed (cornet), and Dariusz Oleszkiewicz (double bass). The album was composed of eleven songs that explored the emotional and spiritual experiences of women and was well-received critically and commercially, achieving double-platinum status.

Beauty Is Dying (2007) was the first album she sang in Polish. She recorded it with a seventeen-piece string orchestra. The album contained nine works by Polish poets that depicted the Warsaw Uprising of 1944. Zaryan chose the works and sang compositions written and arranged by Michał Tokaj. She performed material from the album at the Warsaw Uprising Museum, and the concert was broadcast live on public Polish TV and Polish Radio. In 2008, she was given the Fryderyk Award, the Polish recording industry's highest honor.

== Awards and nominations ==
=== Awards ===
- Best Polish Female Jazz Vocalist, Jazz Forum Readers' Poll, 2008, 2009, 2010, 2011, 2012, and 2013
- Best Poetic Album, Fryderyk Award for Księga Olśnień, 2011
- Best Poetic Album, Fryderyk Award for Beauty is Dying, 2008
- 50 Most Important Ladies of the Capital 2008, Życie Warszawy (Warsaw press)
- Best New Artist, Mateusz Award, Polskie Radio Program III award for Picking up the Pieces 2007
- Second Prize, 1998 International Jazz Vocalists' Competition, Zamość, PL

=== Nominations ===
- Woman of the Year 2008, Gazeta Wyborcza magazine (Wysokie Obcasy)
- Wdechy, 2007, Co Jest Grane (What's Going On) magazine's Warsaw cultural awards
- Best Polish Jazz Vocalist, Jazz Forum Readers' Poll, 2004 and 2005
- Best Jazz Album, My Lullaby, (as Agnieszka Skrzypek), Fryderyk, 2002

== Discography ==
=== Studio albums ===
Year	Album details	Peak chart positions	Certifications
Year	Album details	POL	Certifications
2002	My Lullaby: Released: 27 November 2002; Label: NotTwo	24	POL: Gold
2006	Picking Up the Pieces: Released: 25 February 2006; Label: Cosmopolis	1	POL: 2× Platinum
2007	Umiera piękno: Released: 17 July 2007; Label: Cosmopolis	9	POL: Platinum
2010	Looking Walking Being: Released: 16 March 2010; Label: Blue Note	4	POL: 2× Platinum
2011	A Book of Luminous Things: Released: 14 June 2011; Label: EMI Music Poland/Blue Note	8	POL: Platinum
2011	Księga olśnień: Released: 4 October 2011; Label: EMI Music Poland/Blue Note	24	POL: Gold
2013	Remembering Nina & Abbey: Released: 12 November 2013; Label: Centrala/Parlophone	24	POL: Platinum
2018	What Xmas Means To Me: Released: 9 November 2018; Label: Centrala/Warner Music Poland		
2018	High & Low: Released: 16 November 2018; Label: Centrala/Warner Music Poland		
2022	Sara: Released: 21. October 2022; Label: Centrala/Warner Music Poland		

=== Live albums ===
Year	Album details	Peak chart positions	Certifications
Year	Album details	POL	Certifications
2002	Live at Palladium: Released: November 2008; Label: Formats: CD/DVD	24	POL: 4× Platinum
