= Chico DeBarge =

American musician (born 1966)

- Also known as: Chico DeBarge
- Born: Jonathan Arthur DeBarge; June 23, 1966 (age 60); Detroit, Michigan, U.S.
- Origin: Los Angeles, California, U.S.
- Genres: Pop; R&B; soul; neo soul; hip hop soul
- Occupations: Singer, musician
- Instruments: Keyboards; vocals
- Years active: 1985–present
- Labels: Motown; Kedar

Jonathan Arthur "Chico" DeBarge (born June 23, 1966) is an American R&B singer and musician. DeBarge is one of the few DeBarge children that wasn’t a member of the DeBarge family musical group DeBarge. As a solo artist, he scored a 1986 US Top Forty hit with the song "Talk to Me".

== Career ==
He began a musical career of his own with Motown in the mid-1980s. His debut self-titled album was released in 1986 and featured the hit single "Talk To Me" (No. 21 US, No. 7 R&B). The album peaked at No. 90 on the Billboard 200 and released a follow-up single "The Girl Next Door" which charted on the R&B chart.

Two years later, he released a second album with Motown, Kiss Serious that included the hit R&B single "Rainy Night" (No. 18 R&B) plus "I've Been Watching You" (No. 43 R&B) and the title track (No. 53 R&B). However, he was imprisoned for drug charges not long after and served time in prison for drug trafficking.

After his release in the mid-1990s, DeBarge returned to Motown to continue his musical career under the auspices of Kedar Massenberg and his neo-soul pioneering label imprint Kedar Entertainment. His third album Long Time No See was released on November 18, 1997, to critical acclaim and was preceded by the single "Iggin' Me" which garnered considerable airplay. The album would spawn three additional singles: "Love Still Good," "No Guarantee" (a collaboration with Joe) (No. 18 R&B Airplay) and "Virgin" (No. 97 R&B). A non-album single "Superman" followed and was heard in the 1998 romantic comedy film Woo starring Jada Pinkett Smith and Tommy Davidson and was released on the movie's soundtrack album. "Superman" peaked at No. 55 on the R&B chart.

His fourth album The Game was released on October 26, 1999, and peaked at No. 41 on the Billboard 200. The lead single "Give You What You Want (Fa Sure)" gave him one of his biggest hits (No. 71 US, No. 11 R&B) to date, and had a remix featuring rapper Trina released. The follow-up single "Listen To Your Man" (reuniting him with R&B singer Joe) peaked at No. 41 on the R&B chart and at No. 33 on the R&B Airplay Chart. A third single (which did not appear on the album), "Playa Hater" was released in 2000.

He later moved to the independent record label, Koch Records, where he released 2003's Free (which peaked at No. 43 on the Billboard Independent Albums chart). It featured the single "Home Alone" which garnered some airplay. DeBarge released his first single "Not 2 Gether" on December 17, 2002.

In 2005, DeBarge contributed a song to the Beauty Shop movie soundtrack called "Hard Times."

In 2008, Chico DeBarge appeared in the video for Joe's single, "We're Family" off the Welcome Home, Roscoe Jenkins soundtrack.

His sixth studio album Addiction was released in July 2009 under Kedar Entertainment Group (since 1997) and included the single "Oh No" which peaked at No. 76 on the R&B chart.

On October 2, 2010, DeBarge performed with Glenn Jones, Lenny Williams and Regina Belle at the Performing Arts Center in Tampa, Florida.

In March 2017, he announced he was at work on a new studio album in addition to doing some work on a forthcoming DeBarge family album due in 2018.

In September 2017, he released his first new single in eight years called "Feel Good" featuring Jim Jones and Capone Noel. Additionally, his 2003 album Free was remastered and re-released (as Free Remastered) to include 6 additional tracks. In December 2025, Debarge embarked on his Long Time No See Tour.

== Personal life ==
In 2003, while touring in the Tyler Perry stage play Why Did I Get Married?, DeBarge was stabbed by South Philadelphia Italian mafioso John "Johnny Gongs" Casasanto, inside a Philadelphia nightclub, due to an altercation with one of his associates. The stab wound was within inches of his kidney and lungs.

In 2007, DeBarge was arrested for drug possession in California and later went to rehab. In 2009, he admitted to addictions to heroin, cocaine and prescription medication and based his album, aptly titled Addiction, on his drug usage.

In November 2019, DeBarge was arrested again for drug possession in California.

On April 2, 2020, DeBarge's eldest son, Dontae (born 1984), was murdered in a stabbing incident in the Van Nuys area of Los Angeles, California at age 35.

In January 2021, DeBarge was charged with drug possession, DUI and false impersonation after pretending to be his brother James during a traffic stop in Burbank, California.

== Discography ==
=== Albums ===
- Chico DeBarge (1986)
- Kiss Serious (1988)
- Long Time No See (1997)
- The Game (1999)
- Free (2003)
- Addiction (2009)

=== Singles ===
- 1986: "Talk to Me" (US No. 21, R&B No. 7, CAN No. 40, UK No. 88)
- 1987: "The Girl Next Door" (R&B No. 59, UK No. 164)
- 1987: "I've Been Watching You" (R&B No. 43)
- 1987: "Rainy Night" (R&B No. 18)
- 1988: "Kiss Serious" (R&B No. 53)
- 1997: "Iggin' Me" (UK No. 50)
- 1997: "Love Still Good"
- 1998: "No Guarantee" (featuring Joe)
- 1998: "Virgin" (R&B No. 97)
- 1999: "Soopaman Lover" (R&B No. 55)
- 1999: "Give You What You Want (Fa Sure)" (US No. 71, R&B No. 11)
- 1999: "Give You What You Want (South Central Remix)" (featuring Trina)
- 2000: "Listen to Your Man" (featuring Joe) (R&B No. 41)
- 2000: "Playa Hater"
- 2003: "Home Alone"
- 2009: "Oh No" (R&B No. 59)
- 2017: "Feel Good" (featuring Jim Jones & Capone Noel)
