= Patrick Gleeson =

American musician (1934–2026)

- Born: November 9, 1934; Seattle, Washington, U.S.
- Died: July 19, 2026 (aged 91) Los Angeles, California, U.S.
- Genres: Jazz; electronic music
- Occupation: Musician
- Instrument: Synthesizer
- Years active: 1960s–2026

Patrick Gerald Gleeson (November 9, 1934 – July 19, 2026) was an American musician, synthesizer pioneer, composer and producer. He was known for working with jazz musician Herbie Hancock, and for scoring film and television.

== Life and career ==
Gleeson was born in Seattle, Washington, on November 9, 1934. He moved to San Francisco in the 1960s to teach in the English Department at San Francisco State. Gleeson began experimenting with electronic music in the mid-1960s at the San Francisco Tape Music Center using a Buchla synth and other devices. He resigned his teaching position to become a full-time musician. In 1968, "upon hearing [Wendy] Carlos' Switched-On Bach", (Note: The album Switched On Bach was first issued under a different name by the artist who was later known as Wendy Carlos.) he bought a Moog synthesizer and opened the Different Fur recording studio in San Francisco.

He worked with Herbie Hancock in the early 1970s on two albums (Crossings and Sextant) and subsequent tours, pioneering synthesizers as a live instrument. Hancock initially hired Gleeson as a synthesizer technician and instructor, but ended up asking him to become a full-time band member, expanding the ensemble from six to seven musicians. Hancock has credited Gleeson with introducing him to synthesizers and teaching him technique. Sextant and Headhunters were both recorded in part at Different Fur studios. Gleeson subsequently worked with many other Jazz musicians, including Julian Priester, Lenny White, Freddie Hubbard, Charles Earland, Eddie Henderson and Joe Henderson.

Gleeson recorded a number of solo albums, starting with Beyond the Sun – An Electronic Portrait of Holst's "The Planets" in 1976, to which Carlos contributed the sleeve notes. The album was nominated for a "best engineered recording-classical" Grammy in 1976. Beyond the Sun was followed in 1977 by a more commercial album, Patrick Gleeson's Star Wars.

He worked as a producer and engineer on the 1978 Devo album Q: Are We Not Men? A: We Are Devo!, part of which was recorded at Different Fur. He sold his interest in Different Fur in 1985.

Gleeson was involved in the scoring of a number of film soundtracks, including The Plague Dogs, Apocalypse Now, Crossroads and The Bedroom Window. He also scored nine television series, including Knots Landing.

In 2017 Gleeson retired from film and television scoring and returned to live performance, both as a solo artist and with a trio (Michael Shrieve, drums, and Sam Morrison, reeds).

Gleeson died in Los Angeles from arterial stenosis on July 19, 2026, at the age of 91.

== Discography ==
=== As leader or co-leader ===
- 1976 – Beyond the Sun – An Electronic Portrait of Holst's "The Planets" (Mercury)
- 1977 – Patrick Gleeson's Star Wars (Mercury), reissued on
- 1980 – Rainbow Delta (Passport, reissued on Anthology, 2007)
- 1982 – The Plague Dogs (Original Soundtrack) (CBS)
- 1982 – Patrick Gleeson's Computer Realization of Vivaldi's The Four Seasons(Varèse Sarabande)
- 1986 – Ewoks (1985–1987)
- 1998 – Driving While Black with Bennie Maupin (Intuition)
- 2007 – Slide, a chamber music album of jazz influenced minimalism
- 2008 – Jazz Criminal with Jim Lang and featuring Bennie Maupin and Wallace Roney
- 2019 – Moogfest Live 2019

=== As sideman (partial listing) ===
With Paul Kantner, Grace Slick

- Sunfighter (RCA, 1971)

With Charles Earland

- The Dynamite Brothers (Prestige, 1973)
- Leaving This Planet (Prestige, 1973)

With Herbie Hancock

- Crossings (Warner Bros., 1972)
- Sextant (Columbia, 1973)

With Eddie Henderson

- Realization (Capricorn, 1973)
- Inside Out (Capricorn, 1974)

With Joe Henderson

- Black Narcissus (Milestone, 1976)

With Meat Beat Manifesto

- Actual Sounds + Voices (Nothing Records, 1998)

With Julian Priester

- Love, Love (ECM, 1973)

With Lenny White

- Venusian Summer (Nemperor, 1975)
- Big City (Nemperor, 1977)
- Presents the Adventures of the Astral Pirates (Elektra, 1978)
