= List of post-1950 jazz standards =

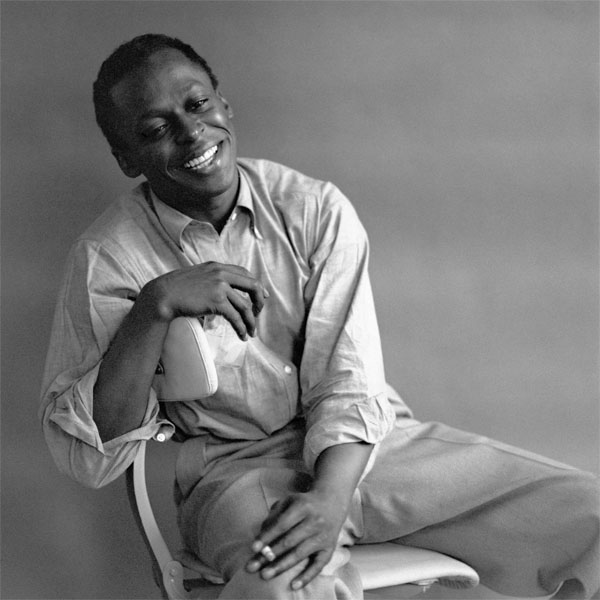
Miles Davis played in Charlie Parker's band during the bebop era and personally influenced the birth of cool jazz, modal jazz and jazz fusion. Standards composed by him include "Donna Lee" (1947), "Milestones" (1958) and "So What" (1959).

Jazz standards are musical compositions that are widely known, performed and recorded by jazz artists as part of the genre's musical repertoire. This list includes tunes written in or after the 1950s that are considered standards by at least one major fake book publication or reference work.

Modal jazz recordings, such as Miles Davis's Kind of Blue, became popular in the late 1950s. Popular modal standards include Davis's "All Blues" and "So What" (both 1959), John Coltrane's "Impressions" (1963) and Herbie Hancock's "Maiden Voyage" (1965). Later, Davis's "second great quintet", which included saxophonist Wayne Shorter and pianist Herbie Hancock, recorded a series of highly acclaimed albums in the mid-to-late 1960s. Standards from these sessions include Shorter's "Footprints" (1966) and Eddie Harris's "Freedom Jazz Dance" (1966).

In Brazil, a new style of music called bossa nova evolved in the late 1950s. Based on Brazilian samba as well as jazz, bossa nova was championed by João Gilberto, Antonio Carlos Jobim and Luiz Bonfá. Gilberto and Stan Getz started a bossa nova craze in the United States with their 1963 album Getz/Gilberto. Among the genre's songs that are now considered standards are Bonfá's "Manhã de Carnaval" (1959), Marcos Valle's "Summer Samba" (1966), and numerous Jobim songs, including "Desafinado" (1959), "The Girl from Ipanema" (1962) and "Corcovado" (1962).

The jazz fusion movement fused jazz with other musical styles, most famously funk and rock. Its golden age was from the late 1960s to the mid-1970s. Top fusion artists, such as Weather Report, Return to Forever, Herbie Hancock and the Mahavishnu Orchestra, achieved cross-over popularity, although public interest in the genre faded at the turn of the 1980s. Fusion's biggest hits, Hancock's "Chameleon" (1973) and Joe Zawinul's "Birdland" (1977), have been covered numerous times thereafter and are sometimes considered modern jazz standards.

== 1950–54 ==
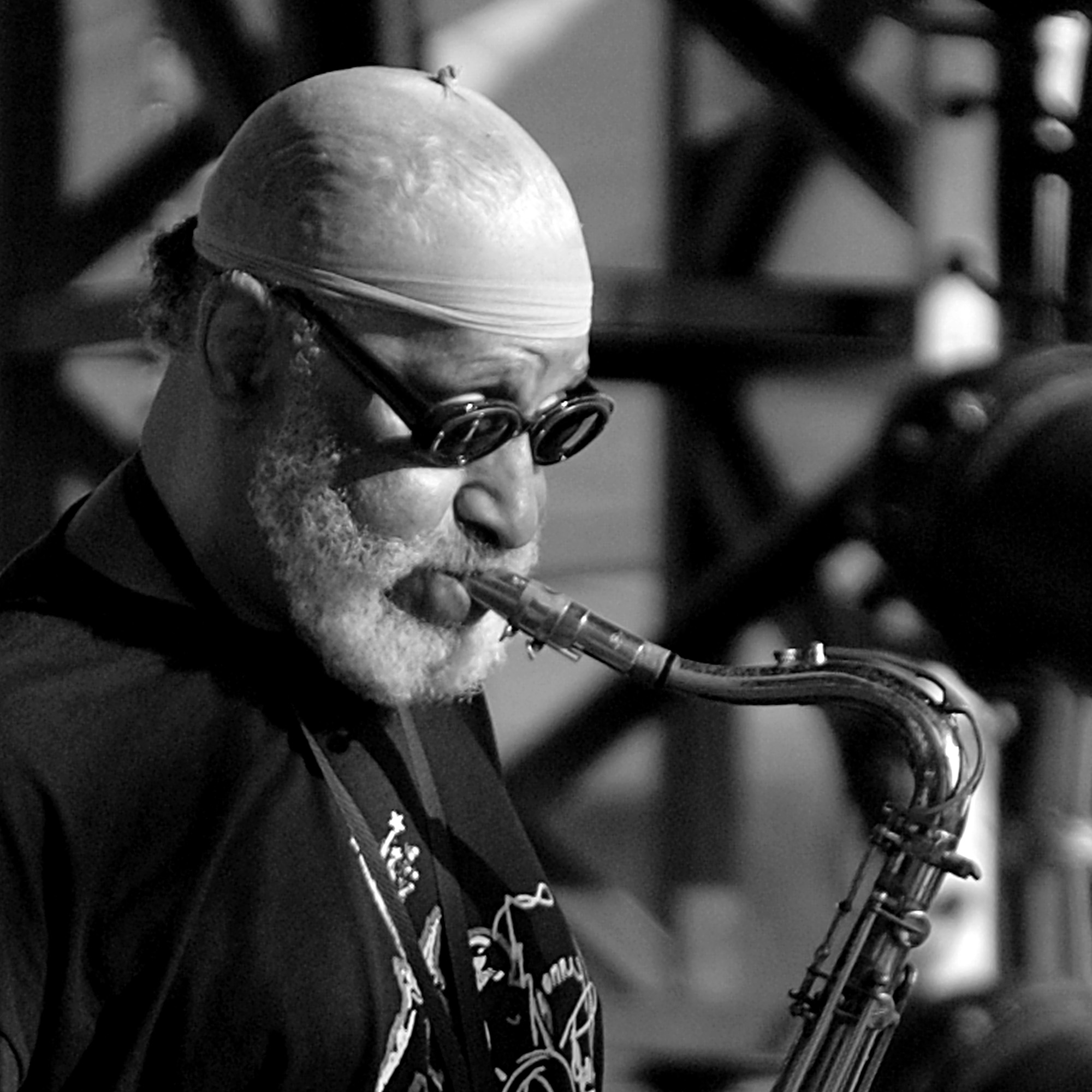
Sonny Rollins played in Thelonious Monk's and Miles Davis's bands in the 1950s before starting a successful solo career. With Davis, he composed the standards "Airegin", "Doxy" and "Oleo".

- 1950 – "If I Were a Bell". Written by Frank Loesser.
- 1951 – "Au Privave". – Bebop composition by Charlie Parker.
- 1951 – "Blues for Alice". Composed by Charlie Parker.
- 1951 – "Birks' Works". Composed by Dizzy Gillespie
- 1951 – "Night Train". Composed by Jimmy Forrest, Lewis P. Simpkins and Oscar Washington.
- 1951 – "Straight, No Chaser". Composed by Thelonious Monk
- 1952 – "Bags' Groove". Composed by Milt Jackson.
- 1952 – "Lullaby of Birdland". Composed by George Shearing with lyrics by George David Weiss.
- 1952 – "My One and Only Love" Composed by Guy Wood with lyrics by Robert Mellin.
- 1952 – "That's All". Written by Bob Haymes and Alan Brandt.
- 1952 – "When I Fall in Love". Composed by Victor Young with lyrics by Edward Heyman.
- 1953 – "Here's That Rainy Day". Composed by Jimmy Van Heusen with lyrics by Johnny Burke.
- 1953 – "Jordu". Composed by Duke Jordan.
- 1953 – "Minority". Composed by Gigi Gryce.
- 1953 – "Satin Doll". Composed by Duke Ellington and Billy Strayhorn with lyrics by Johnny Mercer.
- 1954 – "Airegin". Composed by Sonny Rollins.
- 1954 – "All of You". Written by Cole Porter.
- 1954 – "Blue Monk". Composed by Thelonious Monk.
- 1954 – "Django". Composed by John Lewis.
- 1954 – "Doxy". Composed by Sonny Rollins.
- 1954 – "Fly Me to the Moon" (a.k.a. "In Other Words"). Written by Bart Howard.
- 1954 – "Four". Composed by Miles Davis.
- 1954 – "Joy Spring". Composed by Clifford Brown with lyrics by Jon Hendricks.
- 1954 – "Misty". Composed by Erroll Garner with lyrics by Johnny Burke.
- 1954 – "Oleo". Composed by Sonny Rollins.
- 1954 – "Solar". Composed by Miles Davis.

== 1955–59 ==
- 1955 – "In Your Own Sweet Way". Composed by Dave Brubeck with lyrics by Iola Brubeck, popularized by Brubeck and by Miles Davis.
- 1956 – "Canadian Sunset". Composed by Eddie Heywood with lyrics by Norman Gimbel.
- 1956 – "Con Alma". Composed by Dizzy Gillespie.
- 1956 – "Nica's Dream". Composed by Horace Silver.
- 1956 – "St. Thomas". Composed by Sonny Rollins.
- 1956 – "Waltz for Debby". Composed by Bill Evans with lyrics by Gene Lees.
- 1956 – "Whisper Not". Composed by Benny Golson with lyrics by Leonard Feather.
- 1957 – "Blue Train". Jazz blues composition by John Coltrane from his album Blue Train.
- 1957 – "I Remember Clifford". Composed by Benny Golson with lyrics by Jon Hendricks.
- 1957 – "Li'l Darlin'". Composed by Neal Hefti for the Count Basie Orchestra, which recorded it in 1957.
- 1957 – "Soul Eyes". Composed by Mal Waldron, who added lyrics.
- 1958 – "Chega de Saudade" (a.k.a. "No More Blues"). Composed by Antonio Carlos Jobim with lyrics by Vinicius de Moraes (Portuguese) and Jon Hendricks and Jessie Cavanaugh (English).
- 1958 – "Milestones". Composed by Miles Davis.
- 1958 – "Moanin'". Composed by Bobby Timmons with lyrics by Jon Hendricks.
- 1958 – "Vishnu". Composed by Michael Garrick
- 1959 – "Afro Blue". Composed by Mongo Santamaría.
- 1959 – "All Blues". Composed by Miles Davis.
- 1959 – "The Best Is Yet to Come". Composed by Cy Coleman with lyrics by Carolyn Leigh.
- 1959 – "Blue in Green". – Modal jazz composition from Miles Davis's album Kind of Blue. Credited solely to Davis on Kind of Blue and to Davis and Bill Evans on Evans's Portrait in Jazz, the songs authorship is disputed; Evans and Earl Zindars claim that Evans alone composed the tune.
- 1959 – "Desafinado" (a.k.a. "Slightly Out of Tune", also "Off Key"). Composed by Antonio Carlos Jobim with lyrics by Newton Mendonça (Portuguese), and Jon Hendricks and Jessie Cavanaugh (English).
- 1959 – "Freddie Freeloader". Composed by Miles Davis.
- 1959 – "Giant Steps". Composed by John Coltrane.
- 1959 – "Countdown". Composed by John Coltrane.
- 1959 – "Goodbye Pork Pie Hat". Composed by Charles Mingus.
- 1959 – "Goodbye Tristesse" (a.k.a. "A Felicidade"). Composed by Antonio Carlos Jobim with lyrics by Vinicius de Moraes (Portuguese) and Hal Shaper (English).
- 1959 – "Killer Joe". Composed by Benny Golson.
- 1959 – "Manhã de Carnaval" (a.k.a. "A Day in the Life of a Fool", also "Black Orpheus"). Written by Luiz Bonfá and Antônio Maria with English lyrics by Carl Sigman.
- 1959 – "Mr. P.C.". Composed by John Coltrane.
- 1959 – "My Favorite Things". Composed by Richard Rodgers with lyrics by Oscar Hammerstein II.
- 1959 – "Naima" (a.k.a. "Niema"). Composed by John Coltrane.
- 1959 – "Nostalgia in Times Square". Written by Charles Mingus.
- 1959 – "The Sidewinder". Composed by Lee Morgan.
- 1959 – "So What". Composed by Miles Davis.
- 1959 – "Take Five". Composed by Paul Desmond.

== 1960–64 ==
Herbie Hancock emerged as an influential pianist in the 1960s both as a leader and as part of Miles Davis's "second great quintet". Later he became one of the most popular jazz fusion artists. Standards composed by him include "Watermelon Man" (1963), "Cantaloupe Island" (1964), "Maiden Voyage" (1965) and "Chameleon" (1973).

- 1960 – "Jeannine". Composed by Duke Pearson
- 1961 – "Impressions". Composed by John Coltrane.
- 1961 – "Once I Loved" (a.k.a. "Amor em Paz", also "Love in Peace"). Composed by Antonio Carlos Jobim with lyrics by Vinicius de Moraes (Portuguese) and Ray Gilbert (English).
- 1961 – "One Note Samba" (a.k.a. "Samba de Uma Nota Só"). Composed by Antonio Carlos Jobim with lyrics by Newton Mendonça (Portuguese) and Antonio Carlos Jobim (English).
- 1961 – "Stolen Moments". Composed by Oliver Nelson.
- 1962 – "Corcovado" (a.k.a. "Quiet Nights of Quiet Stars"). Composed by Antonio Carlos Jobim with lyrics by Antonio Carlos Jobim (Portuguese) and Gene Lees (English).
- 1962 – "Days of Wine and Roses". Composed by Henry Mancini with lyrics by Johnny Mercer.
- 1962 – "Meditation" (a.k.a. "Meditação"). Composed by Antonio Carlos Jobim Newton Mendonça (Portuguese) Norman Gimbel (English).
- 1962 – "Up Jumped Spring". Composed by Freddie Hubbard.
- 1963 – "Blue Bossa". Composed by Kenny Dorham.
- 1963 – "Bluesette". Composed by Jean Thielemans with lyrics by Norman Gimbel.
- 1963 – "The Girl from Ipanema" (a.k.a. "Garota de Ipanema"). Composed by Antonio Carlos Jobim with lyrics by Vinicius de Moraes (Portuguese) and Norman Gimbel (English).
- 1963 – "How Insensitive" (a.k.a. "Insensatez"). Composed by Antonio Carlos Jobim with lyrics by Vinicius de Moraes (Portuguese) and Norman Gimbel (English).
- 1963 – "If You Never Come to Me" (a.k.a. "Inútil Paisagem"). Composed by Antonio Carlos Jobim with lyrics by Aloysio de Oliveira (Portuguese) and Ray Gilbert (English).
- 1963 – "Oye Como Va". Written by Tito Puente.
- 1963 – "Recorda Me". Composed by Joe Henderson.
- 1963 – "Só Danço Samba" (a.k.a. "Jazz 'N' Samba"). Composed by Antonio Carlos Jobim with lyrics by Vinicius de Moraes (Portuguese) and Norman Gimbel (English).
- 1963 – "Water to Drink" (a.k.a. "Água de Beber"). Composed by Antonio Carlos Jobim with lyrics by Vinicius de Moraes (Portuguese) and Norman Gimbel (English).
- 1963 – "Watermelon Man". Composed by Herbie Hancock.
- 1964 – "Cantaloupe Island". Composed by Herbie Hancock.
- 1964 – "Inner Urge". Composed by Joe Henderson.
- 1964 – "JuJu". Composed by Wayne Shorter.
- 1964 – "Mahjong". Composed by Wayne Shorter.
- 1964 – "Song for My Father". Composed by Horace Silver.
- 1964 – "Linus and Lucy". Composed by Vince Guaraldi

== 1965–69 ==
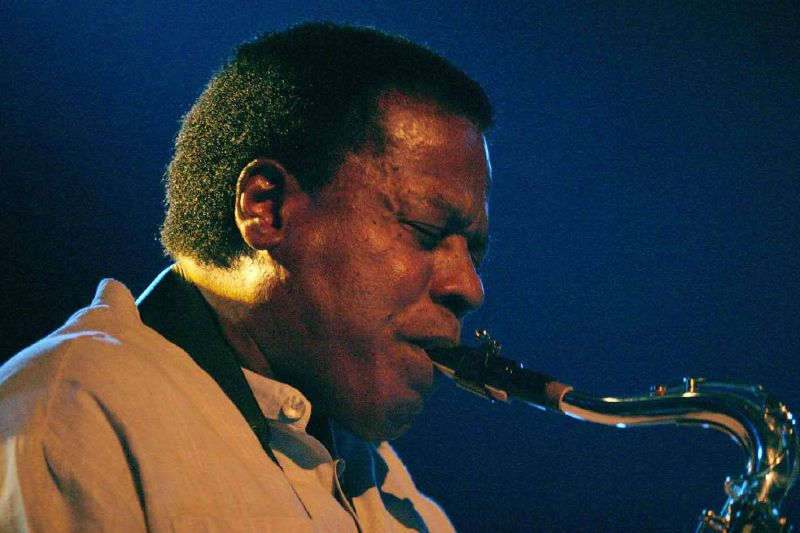
Wayne Shorter's compositions that have become standards include "Mahjong" (1964), "Speak No Evil" (1965) and "Footprints" (1966).

- 1965 – "Ceora". Written by Lee Morgan.
- 1965 – "Dindi". Composed by Antonio Carlos Jobim with lyrics by Aloysio de Oliveira (Portuguese) Ray Gilbert (English).
- 1965 – "Dolphin Dance". Composed by Herbie Hancock.
- 1965 – "E.S.P.". Composed by Wayne Shorter.
- 1965 – "The Gentle Rain" (a.k.a. "Chuva Delicada"). Written by Luiz Bonfá with English lyrics by Matt Dubey.
- 1965 – "The Gift!" (a.k.a. "Recado Bossa Nova"). Composed by Djalma Ferreira, with lyrics by Luiz Antônio (Portuguese) Paul Francis Webster (English).
- 1965 – "Maiden Voyage". Modal jazz composition by Herbie Hancock from his album Maiden Voyage. It was used in a Fabergé commercial and originally called "TV Jingle".
- 1965 – "Speak No Evil". Wayne Shorter.
- 1966 – "Footprints". Composed by Wayne Shorter.
- 1966 – "Litha". Composed by Chick Corea (1st recording appears on Tones for Joan's Bones)
- 1966 – "Mercy, Mercy, Mercy". Composed by Joe Zawinul (with various lyrics added later).
- 1966 – "Summer Samba" (a.k.a. "Samba de Verão", also "So Nice"). Composed by Marcos Valle with lyrics by Paulo Sérgio Valle (Portuguese) Norman Gimbel (English).
- 1967 – "Freedom Jazz Dance". Composed by Eddie Harris.
- 1967 – "Little Sunflower". Composed by Freddie Hubbard with lyrics by Al Jarreau.
- 1967 – "Triste". Written by Antonio Carlos Jobim.
- 1967 – "Wave" (a.k.a. "Vou Te Contar"). Written by Antonio Carlos Jobim.
- 1968 – "Windows". Written by Chick Corea. First recorded Laws' Cause by Hubert Laws in 1968.

== 1970s and beyond ==
- 1970 – "Red Clay". Jazz fusion composition by Freddie Hubbard.
- 1971 – "La Fiesta". Composed by Chick Corea (1st recording appears on Merry-Go-Round by Elvin Jones).
- 1971 – "Spain". Composed by Chick Corea.
- 1971 – "Crystal Silence". Composed by Chick Corea (1st recording appears on Return to Forever by the composer, also recorded with Gary Burton later in the same year).
- 1973 – "Chameleon". Jazz-funk composition by Herbie Hancock, Paul Jackson, Harvey Mason and Bennie Maupin, from Hancock's album Head Hunters.
- 1973 – "Mr. Magic". Written by Ralph MacDonald and William Salter.
- 1973 – "Send in the Clowns". Song by Stephen Sondheim from the musical A Little Night Music.
- 1974 – "Beauty and the Beast". Jazz fusion composition by Wayne Shorter, from the album Native Dancer.
- 1975 – "The Peacocks". Composed by Jimmy Rowles.
- 1977 – "Birdland". Jazz fusion composition by Joe Zawinul. Originally released on Heavy Weather by Weather Report, it is instantly recognizable by bassist Jaco Pastorius' introduction using artificial harmonics, and notes sung by him by the end of the song. The tune was one of the biggest hits of the jazz fusion movement.

== Bibliography ==
=== Reference works ===
- Rosenthal, David H. (1993). Hard Bop: Jazz and black music 1955–1965. Oxford University Press US. ISBN 0-19-508556-6.

=== Fake books ===
- The New Real Book, Volume I. Sher Music. 1988. ISBN 0-9614701-4-3.
- The New Real Book, Volume II. Sher Music. 1991. ISBN 0-9614701-7-8.
- The New Real Book, Volume III. Sher Music. 1995. ISBN 1-883217-30-X.
- The Real Book, Volume I (6th ed.). Hal Leonard. 2004. ISBN 0-634-06038-4.
- The Real Book, Volume II (2nd ed.). Hal Leonard. 2007. ISBN 978-1-4234-2452-9.
- The Real Book, Volume III (2nd ed.). Hal Leonard. 2006. ISBN 0-634-06136-4.
- The Real Jazz Book. Warner Bros. ISBN 978-91-85041-36-7.
- The Real Vocal Book, Volume I. Hal Leonard. 2006. ISBN 0-634-06080-5.
