= Head Hunters =

Studio album by Herbie Hancock
- Released: October 26, 1973
- Recorded: September 1973
- Studios: Wally Heider and Different Fur (San Francisco)
- Genres: Jazz-funk; funk rock; jazz fusion
- Length: 41:52
- Label: Columbia
- Producers: Herbie Hancock; David Rubinson

Herbie Hancock chronology
Sextant (1973)	Head Hunters (1973)	Dedication (1974)

Singles from Head Hunters
- 1. "Chameleon" / "Vein Melter" Released: 1974

Head Hunters is the twelfth studio album by American pianist, keyboardist and composer Herbie Hancock, released October 26, 1973, on Columbia Records. Recording sessions for the album took place in the evening at Wally Heider Studios and Different Fur Trading Co. in San Francisco, California. Hancock is featured with woodwind player Bennie Maupin from his previous "Mwandishi" sextet and three new collaborators – bassist Paul Jackson, percussionist Bill Summers, and drummer Harvey Mason. The latter group of collaborators, which would go on to be known as the Headhunters, also played on Hancock's subsequent studio album Thrust (1974). All of the musicians (with the exception of Mason) play multiple instruments on the album.

The album was a commercial and artistic breakthrough for Hancock, crossing over to funk and rock audiences and bringing jazz-funk and jazz fusion to mainstream attention, peaking at number 13 on the Billboard 200. Today the album is regarded as a landmark of fusion and has influenced artists in numerous other genres. In 2008, the Library of Congress inducted it into the National Recording Registry for being "culturally, historically or aesthetically important".

== Background and recording ==
Head Hunters followed three experimental albums by Hancock's "Mwandishi" sextet: Mwandishi, Crossings, and Sextant, released between 1971 and 1973. He later reflected on moving away from this style:

I began to feel that I had been spending so much time exploring the upper atmosphere of music and the more ethereal kind of far-out spacey stuff. Now there was this need to take some more of the earth and to feel a little more tethered; a connection to the earth. ... I was beginning to feel that we (the sextet) were playing this heavy kind of music, and I was tired of everything being heavy. I wanted to play something lighter.

— Hancock's sleeve notes: 1997 CD reissue

For the new album, Hancock assembled a new band, the Headhunters, of whom only woodwind player Bennie Maupin had been a member of the "Mwandishi" sextet. Hancock handled all synthesizer parts himself, having shared these duties with Patrick Gleeson on Crossings and Sextant, and decided against the use of guitar altogether in favor of the Hohner Clavinet, one of the defining sounds on the album. The new band featured a tight rhythm section composed of Paul Jackson (bass guitar) and Harvey Mason (drums), creating a relaxed funk sensibility that gave it an appeal to a wider audience.

Of the four tracks on the album, "Watermelon Man" was the only one not written for the album. A hit from Hancock's hard bop days, originally appearing on his debut Takin' Off (1962) and later covered by Mongo Santamaría, it was reworked by Hancock and Mason for this album, featuring Bill Summers blowing into a beer bottle in imitation of the hindewho flute used by the Mbuti Pygmies of Zaire. The track features heavy use of African percussion. "Sly" was dedicated to Sly Stone of Sly and the Family Stone. "Chameleon" features a famous bassline played by Hancock on an ARP Odyssey synthesizer. Closing track "Vein Melter" is a slow-burner, predominantly featuring Hancock on Rhodes piano and Maupin on bass clarinet. Heavily edited versions of "Chameleon" and "Vein Melter" were released as two sides of a 45 RPM single.

The Headhunters band, with Mike Clark replacing Mason, worked with Hancock on a number of other albums, including Thrust (1974), Man-Child (1975), and Flood (1975). The subsequent albums Secrets (1976) and Sunlight (1977), had widely diverging personnel. The Headhunters, with Hancock featured as a guest soloist, produced the albums Survival of the Fittest (1975) and Straight from the Gate (1978), the first of which was produced by Hancock and included the hit "God Make Me Funky".

== Album cover ==
The album cover, designed by Victor Moscoso, features Hancock wearing a mask based on the kple kple mask of the Baoulé people of Ivory Coast. Positioned clockwise around Hancock from lower left are Mason, Jackson, Maupin, and Summers.

== Release and reception ==
The album was released on October 26th, 1973. The album was remixed for quadraphonic sound in 1974. Columbia released this mix on LP record in the Stereo Quadraphonic matrix format and 8-track tape. The quadraphonic mixes feature elements not heard in the stereo version, including an additional keyboard melody at the beginning of "Sly". Surround sound versions of the album have been released a number of times on the Super Audio CD format, using a digital transfer of the original four-channel quad mix re-purposed into 5.1 surround sound.

=== Commercial performance ===
Head Hunters was a commercial success, peaking at No. 13 on the Billboard 200 and at No. 2 on the Top R&B/Hip-Hop Albums chart. The album remained in the top 30 and top 5 respectively for each chart into the end of the next year. Ultimately, Head Hunters became the biggest-selling jazz album of all time until surpassed by George Benson's Breezin' in 1976.

== Reception and legacy ==
Professional ratings
Review scores
Source	Rating
AllMusic	5/5 stars
DownBeat	5/5 stars
Jazzwise	5/5 stars
The Penguin Guide to Jazz Recordings	👑
Pitchfork	10/10
Q	4/5 stars
The Rolling Stone Album Guide	3.5/5 stars
The Rolling Stone Jazz Record Guide	3/5 stars
Uncut	4/5 stars

The album received contemporary critical acclaim and continues to receive acclaim. Writing for AllMusic, Stephen Thomas Erlewine would say, "Head Hunters was a pivotal point in Herbie Hancock's career, bringing him into the vanguard of jazz fusion. Hancock had pushed avant-garde boundaries on his own albums and with Miles Davis, but he had never devoted himself to the groove as he did on Head Hunters," concluding, "Jazz purists, of course, decried the experiments at the time, but Head Hunters still sounds fresh and vital decades after its initial release, and its genre-bending proved vastly influential on not only jazz, but funk, soul, and hip-hop."

Writing for Pitchfork, Jeremy Larson would say, "Head Hunters is the bond that connects unnamable forces at the center of jazz and of funk, divine aspirations and base desires, head and body. It’s foolish to try to name the spark of music like this, a parlor game better left to the comedown of an acid trip or a street preacher on his last leg. Head Hunters isn’t the god, it’s just five consummate pros jamming, with a light amount of editing and production."

In 2005, the album was ranked number 498 in the book version of Rolling Stone magazine's list of the 500 Greatest Albums of All Time. While it was not included in Rolling Stone's original 2003 online version of the list, nor its 2012 revision, it was ranked at number 254 in the 2020 revision. Head Hunters was a key release in Hancock's career and a defining moment in the genre of jazz, and has been an inspiration not only for jazz musicians, but also to funk, soul music, jazz funk and hip hop artists. The Library of Congress added it to the National Recording Registry, which collects "culturally, historically or aesthetically important" sound recordings from the 20th century. It was included in the book 1001 Albums You Must Hear Before You Die.

== Track listing ==
All tracks are written by Herbie Hancock, except "Chameleon" by Hancock, Paul Jackson, Harvey Mason, & Bennie Maupin.

Side one
No.	Title	Length
1.	"Chameleon"	15:41
2.	"Watermelon Man"	6:29
Total length:		22:15

Side two
No.	Title	Length
3.	"Sly"	10:15
4.	"Vein Melter"	9:09
Total length:		19:33

== Personnel ==
=== Musicians ===
- Herbie Hancock – Fender Rhodes electric piano, Hohner Clavinet D6, ARP Odyssey and ARP Pro Soloist synthesizers
- Bennie Maupin – tenor saxophone, soprano saxophone, saxello, bass clarinet, alto flute
- Paul Jackson – bass guitar, marímbula
- Harvey Mason – drums; arrangement on "Watermelon Man"
- Bill Summers – agogô, balafon, cabasa, congas, gankogui, log drum, shekere, surdo, tambourine; beer bottle on "Watermelon Man"

=== Production ===
- Herbie Hancock – producer
- David Rubinson – producer
- Fred Catero – engineer
- Jeremy Zatkin – engineer
- Dane Butcher – engineer
- John Vieira – engineer

== Charts ==
=== Weekly charts ===
Chart (1973–1974)	Peak position
US Billboard 200	13
US Top R&B/Hip-Hop Albums (Billboard)	2

=== Year-end charts ===
Chart (1974)	Position
US Billboard 200	21
US Top R&B/Hip-Hop Albums (Billboard)	3
