= Janine =

Janine may refer to:

== People and characters ==
- Janine (given name)

== Music ==
- "Janine" (David Bowie song), a 1969 song by David Bowie
- "Janine", a 1979 song by Trooper from the album Flying Colors
- "Janine", a 1994 song by Soul Coughing from the album Ruby Vroom
- "Janine" (Bushido song), a 2006 song by Bushido
- Janine (singer), a New Zealand singer

== Movies ==
- Janine, a 1961 short film by Maurice Pialat
- Janine, a 1990 film by Cheryl Dunye

== See also ==
- Jeanine
- Jeannine
