= Flood (Herbie Hancock album) =

Live album by Herbie Hancock
- Released: 1975
- Recorded: June 28 - July 1, 1975
- Venue: Shibuya Koukaido, Tokyo; Nakano Sun Plaza, Tokyo
- Genre: Jazz, jazz-funk, funk, jazz fusion
- Length: 74:06
- Label: CBS/Sony
- Producer: David Rubinson

Herbie Hancock chronology
Man-Child (1975)	Flood (1975)	Secrets (1976)

Professional ratings
Review scores
Source	Rating
Allmusic	4/5 stars
The Penguin Guide to Jazz Recordings	3/4 stars

Flood is the second live album, and sixteenth album overall, by American jazz pianist and keyboardist Herbie Hancock. Recorded live in Tokyo, the album was originally released exclusively in Japan in 1975 as a double LP 洪水, reads kōzui meaning flood. It features The Headhunters (saxophonist Bennie Maupin, bass guitarist Paul Jackson, percussionist Bill Summers and drummer Mike Clark, along with guitarist DeWayne McKnight) performing selections from the albums Maiden Voyage (track 1), Head Hunters (tracks 4 and 6), Thrust (tracks 2, 3, and 5), and Man-Child (track 7)–– with the latter album still two months away from release at the time of these concerts.

Flood remained a Japanese-only release in all formats until a 2014 CD reissue in the U.S. by the Wounded Bird label.

The cover artwork was designed by Nobuyuki Nakanishi.

== Track listing ==
All compositions by Herbie Hancock except where noted.

Side One
No.	Title	Length
1.	"Introduction/Maiden Voyage"	7:59
2.	"Actual Proof"	8:28

Side Two
No.	Title	Length
3.	"Spank-a-Lee"	8:47
4.	"Watermelon Man"	5:50

Side Three
No.	Title	Writer(s)	Length
5.	"Butterfly"	Hancock, Bennie Maupin	12:44
6.	"Chameleon"	Hancock, Jackson, Harvey Mason, Maupin	10:24

Side Four
No.	Title	Writer(s)	Length
7.	"Hang Up Your Hang Ups"	Hancock, Jackson, Melvin "Wah-Wah" Ragin	19:54

== Personnel ==
- Herbie Hancock – acoustic piano, Fender Rhodes, clavinet, ARP Odyssey, ARP Soloist, ARP String Ensemble
- Bennie Maupin – soprano saxophone, tenor saxophone, saxello, bass clarinet, flute, percussion
- DeWayne "Blackbyrd" McKnight – guitar
- Paul Jackson – Fender bass
- Mike Clark – drum set
- Bill Summers – congas, percussion
