= Janeen =

Janeen is a female given name. Notable women with the given name include:

- Janeen L. Birckhead, American military officer
- Janeen Brady (born 1934), American composer, lyricist and publisher of children's music, patriotic songs, educational music and religious songs and hymns
- Janeen Brian (born 1948), Australian writer of children's books
- Janeen Sollman, American Democratic politician
- Janeen Uzzell, American mechanical engineer and business executive
- Janeen Webb (born 1951), Australian writer, critic and editor, working mainly in the field of science fiction and fantasy

== See also ==
- Janine
- Jeanine
- Jeannine
