= Janine (given name) =

Janine is a feminine given name and may refer to:

== People ==
- Janine Balding (1967–1988), Australian murder victim
- Janine Bazin (1923–2003), French film and television producer
- Janine Beermann (born 1983), German field hockey player
- Janine Berdin (born 2002), Filipina singer
- Janine Bowman (born 1973), American sport shooter
- Janine Cayet (1943), French politician, advocate for disabled people
- Janine Chamot (born 1983), Swiss footballer
- Janine Charrat (1924–2017), French dancer and choreographer
- Janine Connes (1926–2024), French astronomer
- Janine Duvitski (born 1952), English actress
- Janine Flock (born 1989), Austrian skeleton racer
- Janine Foster, New Zealand singer
- Janine P. Geske (born 1949), American jurist and law professor
- Janine Gray (1940–2022), British actress
- Janine Greiner (born 1981), Swiss curler
- Janine Gutierrez (born 1989), Filipina actress and television host
- Janine Haines (1945–2004), Australian politician
- Janine Harouni (fl. 2010's) UK based American comedian and actress
- Janine Irons, British music educator, artist manager and producer
- Janine Jackowski (born 1976), German film producer
- Janine Jambu (1942–2012), French activist and politician
- Janine Jansen (born 1978) Dutch violinist
- Janine Kohlmann (born 1990), German modern pentathlete
- Janine Leal (born 1976), Venezuelan television presenter and model.
- Janine Lindemulder (born 1968), American exotic dancer and adult film actress
- Janine LaManna (born 1966), American actress, voice actress and singer
- Janine Pommy Vega (1942–2010), American poet
- Janine Rozier (born 1938), French senator
- Janine Schmitt (born 2000), Swiss alpine skier
- Janine Thompson (born 1967), Australian tennis player
- Janine Tugonon (born 1989), Filipino model, TV presenter and beauty pageant titleholder
- Janine Turner (born 1962), American actress
- Janine van Wyk (born 1987), South African women's footballer
- Janine Zacharia, American journalist

== Fictional characters ==
- Janine Butcher, in EastEnders
- Janine Nebeski, in Bad Girls
- Janine (Pokémon), in the Pokémon universe
- Janine Melnitz, in the Ghostbusters films
- Janine, a recurring character in sitcom Friends played by Elle Macpherson
- Janine, a fictional character from Witch & Wizard, a novel by James Patterson
- Janine, the previous name of Ofwarren, a fictional character from The Handmaid's Tale, a novel by Margaret Atwood
- Janine Teagues, the protagonist of Abbott Elementary, a sitcom

== See also ==
- Janeen
- Janie
- Jeanine
- Jeannine
