= V.S.O.P. (album) =

Live album by Herbie Hancock
- Released: April 1977
- Recorded: June 29, 1976
- Genre: Jazz, post-bop, jazz fusion
- Length: 86:35
- Label: Columbia
- Producer: David Rubinson

Herbie Hancock chronology
Secrets (1976)	V.S.O.P. (1977)	Herbie Hancock Trio (1977)

Professional ratings
Review scores
Source	Rating
Allmusic	4.5/5 stars
The Rolling Stone Jazz Record Guide	5/5 stars
The Penguin Guide to Jazz Recordings	2.5/4 stars

V.S.O.P. is a 1977 double live album by keyboardist Herbie Hancock, featuring acoustic jazz performances by the V.S.O.P. Quintet (Hancock, trumpeter Freddie Hubbard, saxophonist Wayne Shorter, bassist Ron Carter and drummer Tony Williams), along with jazz fusion/jazz-funk performances by the ‘Mwandishi’ band (trumpeter Eddie Henderson, trombonist Julian Priester, flautist Bennie Maupin, bassist Buster Williams and drummer Billy Hart) and The Headhunters (saxophonist Maupin, guitarists Ray Parker Jr. and Wah Wah Watson, bass guitarist Paul Jackson, percussionist Kenneth Nash and drummer James Levi).

The concert was advertised as a "Herbie Hancock Retrospective," and Miles Davis, who was several months into his temporary retirement, was advertised as playing with the V.S.O.P. group (thereby reconstituting Davis’ "Second Great Quintet" for the first time since 1968). According to concert attendees, on the night of the show a handwritten sign was posted on the lobby door announcing that Davis would not be playing, but that Hubbard would be appearing instead.

== Track listing ==
1. "Piano Introduction" – 4:33
2. "Maiden Voyage" (Hancock) – 13:18
3. "Nefertiti" (Shorter) – 5:17
4. "Introduction of Players/Eye of the Hurricane" (Hancock) – 18:35
5. "Toys" (Hancock) – 14:00
6. "Introductions" – 1:47
7. "You'll Know When You Get There" (Hancock) – 7:00
8. "Hang Up Your Hang Ups" (Hancock, Jackson, Ragin) – 11:54
9. "Spider" (Hancock, Jackson, Ragin) – 10:12

Recorded live at the Newport Jazz Festival, New York City Center, New York City, Tuesday, June 29, 1976.

Tracks 1–4 performed by V.S.O.P., Tracks 5–7 performed by Mwandishi, Tracks 8–9 performed by the Headhunters.

== Personnel ==
=== Musicians ===
Track 1:

- Herbie Hancock – acoustic piano (Yamaha CP-70)

Tracks 2, 3, 4:

- Herbie Hancock – acoustic piano (Yamaha CP-70)
- Ron Carter – bass
- Tony Williams – drums
- Wayne Shorter – soprano saxophone, tenor saxophone
- Freddie Hubbard – trumpet, flugelhorn

Tracks 5, 6, 7:

- Herbie Hancock – electric piano (Rhodes, clavinet)
- Buster Williams – bass
- Billy Hart – drums
- Eddie Henderson – trumpet, flugelhorn, sound effects
- Bennie Maupin – alto flute
- Julian Priester – tenor & bass trombone

Tracks 8, 9:

- Herbie Hancock – electric piano (Rhodes, clavinet), synthesizer/FX
- Melvin "Wah Wah" Ragin – guitar
- Ray Parker Jr. – guitar
- Paul Jackson – electric bass
- James Levi – drums
- Kenneth Nash – percussion
- Bennie Maupin – tenor & soprano saxophones, lyricon

=== Production ===
- Fred Catero – engineer
- David Rubinson – engineer, producer
