= Jeananne =

Jeananne is a feminine given name. Notable people with the name include:

- Jeananne Crowley (born 1949), Irish actress and writer
- Jeananne Goossen (born 1985), Canadian actress

== See also ==
- Jeanine
