= Watermelon Man (composition) =

1962 song written by Herbie Hancock

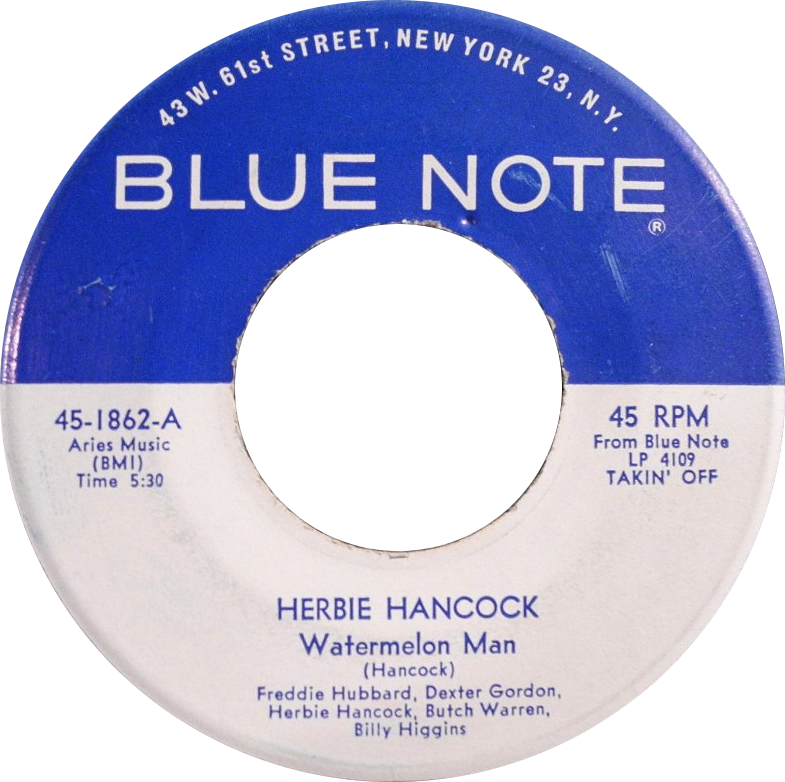
- US single of the 1963 Herbie Hancock recording

Instrumental by Herbie Hancock

from the album Takin' Off
- Released: 1962
- Recorded: late 1961
- Genre: Hard bop; soul jazz
- Length: 7:09
- Label: Blue Note
- Songwriter: Herbie Hancock
- Producer: Alfred Lion

"Watermelon Man" is a jazz standard written by Herbie Hancock for his debut album, Takin' Off (1962).

Hancock's first version was recorded in a hard bop style, featuring solos by trumpeter Freddie Hubbard and saxophonist Dexter Gordon. A single release reached #12 on Billboard's Bubbling Under chart in March 1963. Afro-Cuban percussionist Mongo Santamaría subsequently released a version, with vocals, which became a surprise hit, reaching No. 10 on the Hot 100 in April 1963. Santamaría's recording was inducted into the Grammy Hall of Fame in 1998. Hancock later recorded a funk version of "Watermelon Man" for the album Head Hunters (1973).

== 1962 Herbie Hancock version ==
Hancock wrote the piece to help sell his debut album as a leader, Takin' Off (1962), on Blue Note Records; it was the first piece of music he had ever composed with a commercial goal in mind. The popularity of the piece, due primarily to Mongo Santamaría's version, paid Hancock's bills for five or six years. Hancock did not feel the composition was a sellout, however, describing it as one of his strongest pieces structurally.

"Watermelon Man" is written in a sixteen-bar blues form. Recalling the piece, Hancock said, "I remember the cry of the watermelon man making the rounds through the back streets and alleys of Chicago. The wheels of his wagon beat out the rhythm on the cobblestones." The tune drew on elements of R&B, soul jazz, and bebop. Hancock joined bassist Butch Warren and drummer Billy Higgins in the rhythm section, with Freddie Hubbard on trumpet and Dexter Gordon on tenor saxophone. Hancock's chordal work draws from the gospel tradition, while he builds his solo on repeated riffs and trilled figures.

== Mongo Santamaría version ==
"Watermelon Man"
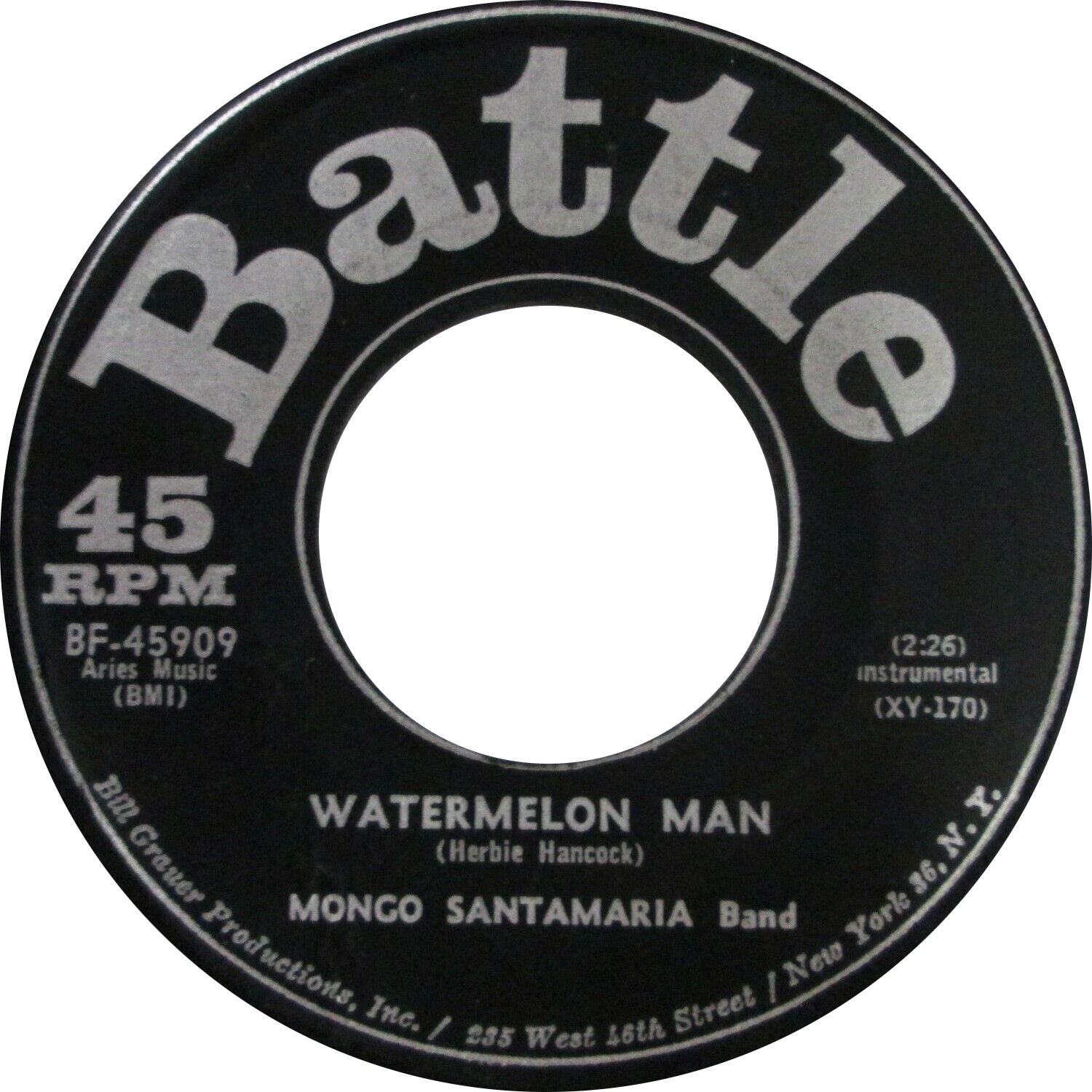
- US single of the Mongo Santamaría Band recording

Single by Mongo Santamaría

from the album Watermelon Man!
- B-side: "Don't Bother Me No More"
- Released: February 1963
- Recorded: 1963
- Genre: Boogaloo; Afro-Cuban jazz
- Length: 2:00
- Label: Battle
- Songwriter: Herbie Hancock

After pianist Chick Corea left Afro-Cuban jazz percussionist Mongo Santamaría's band, Hancock served as a temporary replacement for a weekend engagement at a nightclub in The Bronx. During this engagement, Hancock played "Watermelon Man" for Santamaría at Donald Byrd's urging. Santamaría started accompanying him on his congas, the rest of the band joined in, and the small audience slowly got up from their tables and started dancing. Santamaría later asked Hancock if he could record the tune. On December 17, 1962, he recorded a three-minute version, suitable for radio, where he joined timbalero Francisco "Kako" Baster and Victor Venegas on bass in a cha-cha beat, while drummer Ray Lucas performed a backbeat. With the enthusiasm of record producer Orrin Keepnews, the band re-recorded the song and released it as a single under Battle Records. The single reached number 10 on Billboard in April 1963. Santamaría subsequently included the track on his album Watermelon Man! (1963). Santamaría's recording is sometimes considered the beginning of the boogaloo genre, a fusion of Afro-Cuban jazz and R&B.

=== Chart performance ===
Chart (1963)	Peak position
US Billboard Hot 100	10

== 1973 Herbie Hancock version ==
Hancock re-recorded "Watermelon Man" for Head Hunters (1973), combining synthesizers with a funk beat influenced by James Brown and Sly and the Family Stone, adding an eight-bar section. Hancock described his approach to Down Beat magazine in 1979: "In the popular forms of funk, which I've been trying to get into, the attention is on the rhythmic interplay between different instruments. The part the Clavinet plays has to fit with the part the drums plays and the line the bass plays and the line that the guitar plays. It's almost like African drummers, where seven drummers play different parts". A live version of this arrangement was released on the double LP Flood (1975), recorded in Japan.

On the intro and outro of the tune, percussionist Bill Summers blows into beer bottles in an imitation of hindewhu, a style of singing/whistle-playing found in Pygmy music of Central Africa. Hancock and Summers were struck by the sound, which they heard on the album The Music of the Ba-Benzélé Pygmies (1966) recorded by Simha Arom and Geneviève Taurelle.

This version was often featured on The Weather Channel's Local on the 8s segments. It was also played in the 2018 movie mid90s.

== Other versions ==
"Watermelon Man" has become a jazz standard, and has been recorded over two hundred times:

- In 1963, Jamaican trumpeter Baba Brooks and his band recorded "Watermelon Man Ska."
- In 1964, David Bowie's band 'The Manish Boys' played the song live but no recorded version is known.
- In 1965, Manfred Mann released it as a track on their EP The One in the Middle.
- In 1969 Big Mama Thornton gave her interpretation at the Newport Folk Festival (Newport, RI).
- In 2003, pianist David Benoit covered the song from his album Right Here, Right Now.

== Samples ==
Hancock's recording has been sampled in:

- "1-900-LL-Cool-J" from Walking with a Panther (1989) by LL Cool J
- "Open Your Eyes" from Organized Konfusion (1991) by Organized Konfusion
- "Here We Go Again" from Smoke Some Kill (1988) by Schoolly D
- "Pocket Full of Furl" from Uptown 4 Life (1996) by U.N.L.V.
- "Sanctuary" from Bedtime Stories (1994) by Madonna
- "Dolly My Baby" from Don Dada (1992) by Super Cat
- ”Libri Di Sangue” from Verba Manent (1994) by Frankie high-nrg mc

== Personnel ==
Takin' Off version:

- Herbie Hancock – piano
- Dexter Gordon – tenor saxophone
- Billy Higgins – drums, percussion
- Freddie Hubbard – trumpet
- Butch Warren – double bass

Head Hunters version:

- Herbie Hancock – Fender Rhodes electric piano, clavinet, synthesizers
- Bennie Maupin – soprano saxophone
- Bill Summers – percussion, beer bottle
- Harvey Mason – drums
- Paul Jackson – bass guitar
