= Death Wish (soundtrack) =

Death Wish: Original Soundtrack Recording

Soundtrack album by Herbie Hancock
- Released: October 11, 1974
- Recorded: 1974
- Genre: Jazz fusion
- Length: 40:28
- Label: Columbia
- Producer: David Rubinson, Herbie Hancock

Herbie Hancock chronology
Thrust (1974)	Death Wish: Original Soundtrack Recording (1974)	Man-Child (1975)

Professional ratings
Review scores
Source	Rating
AllMusic	2/5 stars
The Penguin Guide to Jazz Recordings	2.5/4 stars
The Rolling Stone Jazz Record Guide	2/5 stars

Death Wish: Original Soundtrack Recording is a soundtrack album by Herbie Hancock featuring music composed for Dino De Laurentiis' film Death Wish released on October 11, 1974, on Columbia Records.

== Track listing ==
1. "Death Wish (Main Title)" - 6:14
2. "Joanna's Theme" - 4:46
3. "Do a Thing" - 2:13
4. "Paint Her Mouth" - 2:17
5. "Rich Country" - 3:46
6. "Suite Revenge: (a) Striking Back, (b) Riverside Park, (c) The Alley, (d) Last Stop, (e) 8th Avenue Station" - 9:25
7. "Ochoa Knose" - 2:08
8. "Party People" - 3:33
9. "Fill Your Hand" - 6:16

All compositions by Herbie Hancock

== Personnel ==
- Herbie Hancock: piano, Fender Rhodes electric piano, Hohner D-6 Clavinet, ARP Odyssey, ARP Soloist, ARP 2600, ARP String Ensemble, conductor, arranger
- Jerry Peters: conductor, arranger (tracks 1, 2, 5, and 6b)

The Headhunters Band with Wah Wah Watson
