= Street Chant =

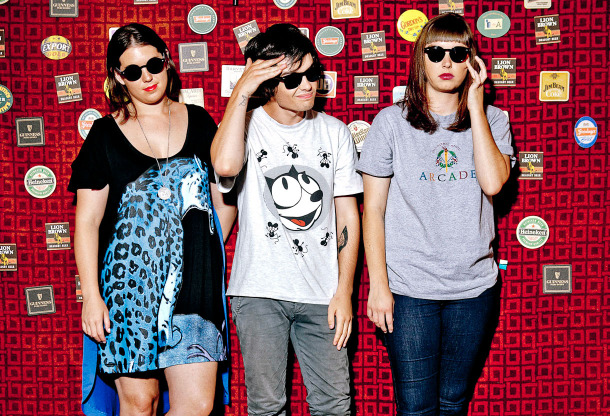
- Street Chant in 2013

Background information
- Also known as: Mean Street
- Origin: Auckland, New Zealand
- Genres: Indie rock, punk rock
- Years active: 2007–2018
- Labels: Arch Hill, Flying Nun Records
- Past members: Emily Edrosa; Billie Rogers; Christopher Varnham; Mikey Sperring; Alex Brown
- Website: streetchant.com

Street Chant were a New Zealand indie rock band who were signed to Flying Nun Records.

The band formed in Auckland in late 2007 with Emily Edrosa on guitar and vocals, Billie Rogers on bass and backing vocals and Mikey Sperring on drums, originally with the name Mean Street. In 2009, Sperring left and was replaced by Alex Brown and the band changed their name to Street Chant.

In 2010, the band released their debut album Means to critical acclaim, and won the inaugural Critics Choice Prize at the 2010 New Zealand Music Awards. In 2011, Means was shortlisted for the Taite Music Prize, and nominated for "Best Alternative Album" at the 2011 New Zealand Music Awards

In 2011, Street Chant opened for The Lemonheads in their "It's a Shame About Ray" 20th anniversary American tour.

In 2012, the band released the double A-side 7" single "Frail Girls" / "Salad Daze".

In 2013, Street Chant released a 5 track cassette/free download EP called Isthmus of One Thousand Lovers.

In late 2013, Street Chant performed a New Zealand tour as backing band for David Saunders of the 90's Flying Nun Records band The 3D's, performing a selection of 3Ds songs and covers.

In early 2015, it was announced that Alex Brown had left the band, and was replaced by Christopher Varnham of Auckland post-punk band Wilberforces.

Street Chant released their second album "Hauora" in 2016 to critical acclaim. Pedestrian Support League was nominated for the 2016 Silver Scroll. Hauora won the prestigious Taite Music Prize in 2017.

As of 2020, Street Chant are no longer together. Emily releases music under Emily Edrosa.

== Discography ==
=== Albums ===
Year	Title	Details	Peak chart positions
Year	Title	Details	NZ
2010	Means	Released: 22 August 2010; Formats: LP/CD/digital download; Label: Arch Hill Recordings	30
2016	Hauora	Released: 1 April 2016; Formats: LP/CD/digital download; Label: Flying Nun Records	14
"—" denotes releases that did not chart or were not released in that country.

=== EPs ===
Year	Title	Details	Peak chart positions
Year	Title	Details	NZ
2013	Isthmus of One Thousand Lovers	Released: 11 July 2013; Formats: Cassette tape/digital download; Label: Self released	—
"—" denotes releases that did not chart or were not released in that country.

=== Singles ===
Year	Single	Peak chart positions	Album
Year	Single	NZ	Album
2010	"Scream Walk" Split with "Got Milky" by Brand New Math	—	Non-album single
2012	"Sink"	—	Non-album single
2012	"Frail Girls" / "Salad Daze"	—	Non-album single
2015	"Pedestrian Support League"	—	Hauora
2015	"Never"	—	Hauora
2016	"Insides"	—	Hauora
2017	"Melbourne"	—	Hauora
"—" denotes releases that did not chart or were not released in that country.

=== Music videos ===
Year	Music video	Director(s)
2009	"Scream Walk"	Thom Burton
2010	"Yr Philosophy"	Rover
2011	"Less Chat More Sewing"	Rover
2011	"Stoned Again"	Andrew Moore
2012	"Frail Girls"	Levi Beamish
2012	"Salad Daze"	Damian Golfinopoulos
2012	"Sink"	Claire Littler
2013	"Tear My Whole Face Off"	Anna Littler, Emily Littler
2015	Pedestrian Support League	Simon Ward
2016	"Insides"	Adam Von Penfold
2017	"Melbourne"	Frances Carter

== Awards and nominations ==
Year	Nominee / work	Award	Result
2010	Means	New Zealand Music Awards - Critics' Choice Prize	Won
2011	Means	New Zealand Music Awards - Best Alternative Album	Nominated
2011	Means	Taite Music Prize	Nominated
2016	"Pedestrian Support League"	Silver Scroll Award	Shortlisted
