= Mike Clark (drummer) =

American jazz and funk drummer (b. 1946)

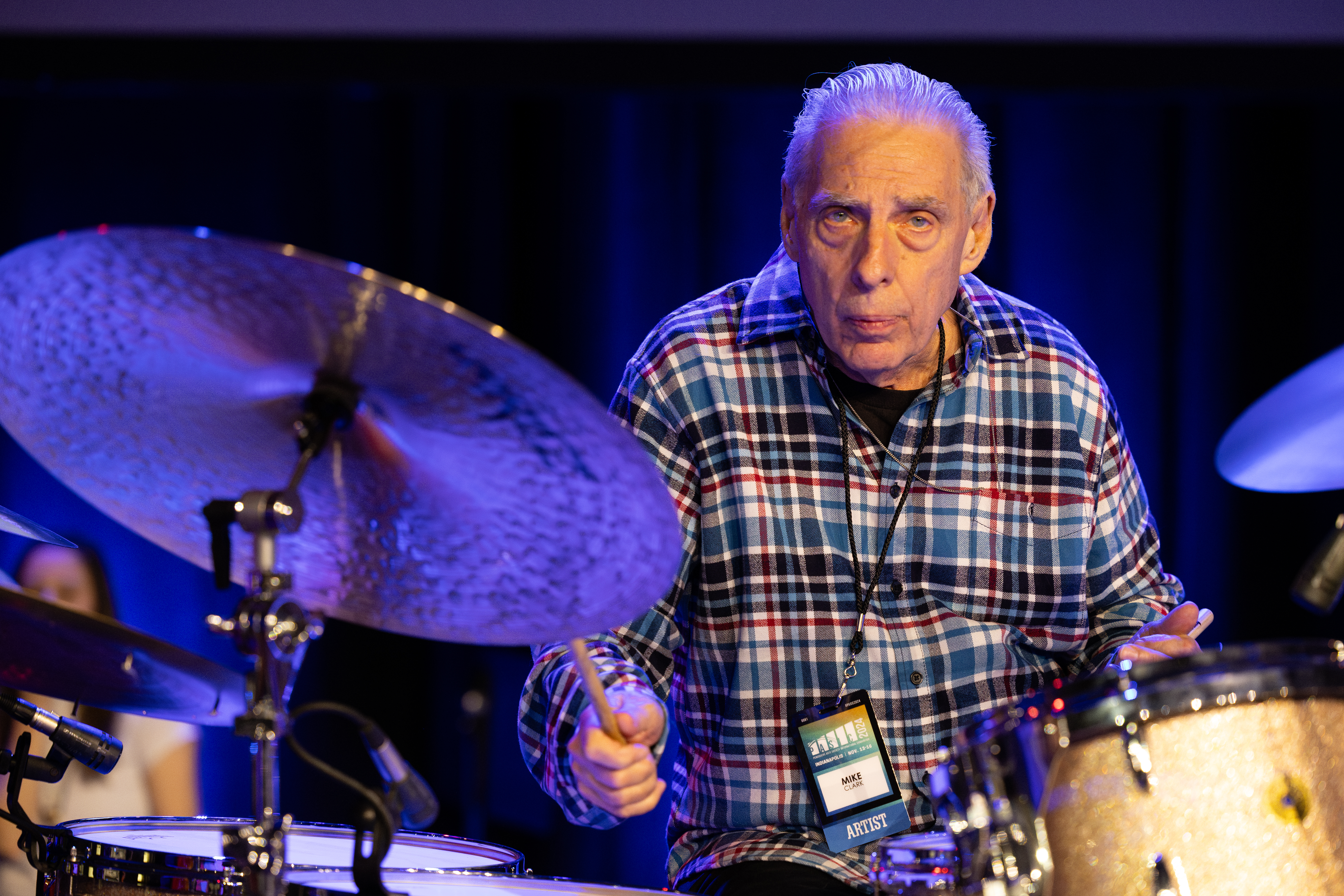
- Clark in 2024

Background information
- Born: Michael Jeffrey Clark; October 3, 1946 (age 79); Sacramento, California, U.S.
- Genres: Jazz; jazz-funk; post-bop
- Occupation: Musician
- Instrument: Drums
- Years active: 1960s–present
- Member of: The Headhunters
- Formerly of: Herbie Hancock's Headhunters, Brand X
- Website: mikeclarkdrums.com

Michael Jeffrey Clark (born October 3, 1946) is an American jazz and funk drummer. He is best known for his work in the 1970s with Herbie Hancock and the Headhunters, particularly his performance on Hancock's album Thrust (1974). Clark's syncopated approach on tracks including "Actual Proof" became influential among jazz and funk drummers, while recordings by the Headhunters were later sampled by hip-hop artists.

== Early life ==
Clark was born in Sacramento, California. His father had been a drummer and later worked for the railroad, and the family moved frequently throughout the United States. Clark began playing drums at about age four and, with his father's encouragement, sat in with jazz groups while still a child. He began working professionally as a teenager, playing jazz as well as blues and rhythm and blues.

Clark has identified Art Blakey as an important early influence. He also listened to drummers including Gene Krupa, Buddy Rich, Jo Jones, Max Roach, Philly Joe Jones, and Elvin Jones.

== Career ==
=== Bay Area ===
By the late 1960s, Clark was working in the San Francisco Bay Area, including in organ trios. He became associated with the rhythmically intricate style sometimes called Oakland or East Bay funk. Clark described the style as using syncopated sixteenth-note bass and drum patterns with jazz-derived improvisation.

During the early 1970s, Clark worked with pianist and composer Vince Guaraldi. He played on studio and live recordings made in 1970 and 1971 that were later collected on the archival album Oaxaca (2004). In 1973, he played in the Guaraldi quintet that recorded the score for A Charlie Brown Thanksgiving, alongside bassist Seward McCain, trumpeter Tom Harrell, and trombonist Chuck Bennett. Clark's broken, funk-influenced rhythms contributed to the score's jazz-funk character, particularly on its arrangement of "Linus and Lucy". Clark also participated in Guaraldi's 1973–1974 recording sessions for It's a Mystery, Charlie Brown.

Clark also performed in the Bay Area with musicians including Woody Shaw and Bobby Hutcherson. Bassist Paul Jackson, with whom Clark had played in Oakland, recommended him to Herbie Hancock. Clark replaced Harvey Mason in Hancock's touring group and first recorded with Hancock on Thrust (1974). That same year, Clark played on Betty Davis's album They Say I'm Different.

Clark subsequently appeared on Hancock's Flood (1975) and Man-Child (1975). He and Jackson also played on the Headhunters albums Survival of the Fittest (1975) and Straight from the Gate (1977). "God Make Me Funky", from Survival of the Fittest, became a frequently sampled recording in hip-hop.

=== Later work ===
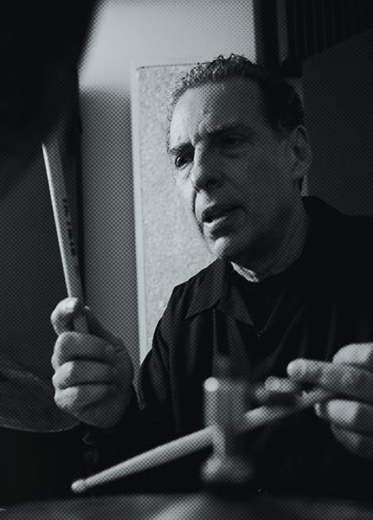
Clark, 1990s

In the late 1970s Clark worked with the British jazz-rock group Brand X, appearing on Product (1979) and Do They Hurt? (1980). He later returned to the Headhunters for recordings including Return of the Headhunters! (1998), Evolution Revolution (2003), and Speakers in the House (2022). He has shared leadership of the group with percussionist Bill Summers.

Clark began recording under his own name with Give the Drummer Some (1989). His subsequent albums included The Funk Stops Here (1992), made with Paul Jackson; Actual Proof (2000); Summertime (2003); and Blueprints of Jazz, Vol. 1 (2008). The latter, featuring Christian McBride, Patrice Rushen, Donald Harrison, Christian Scott, and Jed Levy, emphasized Clark's background in acoustic post-bop as well as funk.

Clark continued to record as a leader and collaborator in the 2010s and 2020s. His trio album Plays Herbie Hancock (2023), with pianist Jon Davis and bassist Leon Lee Dorsey, reinterpreted compositions from across Hancock's career.

== Musical style and influence ==
Clark's funk playing combines syncopated sixteenth-note patterns with the phrasing and interaction of bebop and post-bop drumming. His performance on "Actual Proof" has been noted for its displacement of accents and its loose, interactive approach to the groove. Although closely identified with funk and fusion, Clark has described himself primarily as a jazz drummer, and much of his work as a leader has been in straight-ahead jazz.

== Books ==
Clark is the author of two instructional books. Funk Drumming: Innovative Grooves & Advanced Concepts (Hal Leonard, 2005) combines interviews with notated examples of his funk patterns and accompanying audio. The Post-Bop Drum Book: A Complete Overview of Contemporary Jazz Drumming (Hudson Music, 2020) addresses topics including ride-cymbal technique, comping, rhythmic independence, jazz waltz, and bebop and post-bop phrasing.

Clark's autobiography, God Make Me Funky: Confessions of a Headhunter and Bad-Ass Buddhist Drummer, as told to jazz writer Bill Milkowski, is scheduled for publication by Bloomsbury's Backbeat imprint on February 4, 2027.

== Selected discography ==
=== As leader or co-leader ===
- Give the Drummer Some (Stash, 1989)
- The Funk Stops Here, with Paul Jackson (Enja, 1992)
- The Headhunter: Master Drummers, Volume Three (Ubiquity, 1995)
- Summertime (JazzKey, 2003)
- Blueprints of Jazz, Vol. 1 (Talking House, 2008)
- Carnival of Soul (Owl Studios, 2010)
- Indigo Blue: Live at the Iridium (HighNote, 2019)
- Mike Drop, with Michael Zilber (Sunnyside, 2021)
- Plays Herbie Hancock (Sunnyside, 2023)
- Kosen Rufu (Wide Hive, 2023)
- Itai Doshin (Wide Hive, 2025)
- Kuon Ganjo: Time Without Beginning (Wide Hive, 2026)

=== With Vince Guaraldi ===
- Oaxaca (D & D, 2004; recorded 1970–1971)
- A Charlie Brown Thanksgiving: Original Soundtrack Recording (Lee Mendelson Film Productions, 2023; recorded 1973)
- It's the Easter Beagle, Charlie Brown: Original Soundtrack Recording (Lee Mendelson Film Productions, 2025; Clark appears on the 2021 bonus recording "Woodstock Medley")
- It's a Mystery, Charlie Brown: Original Soundtrack Recording (Lee Mendelson Film Productions, 2026; recorded 1973–1974)

=== With Herbie Hancock ===
- Thrust (Columbia, 1974)
- Flood (CBS/Sony, 1975)
- Man-Child (Columbia, 1975)

=== With the Headhunters ===
- Survival of the Fittest (Arista, 1975)
- Straight from the Gate (Arista, 1977)
- Return of the Headhunters! (Verve, 1998)
- Evolution Revolution (Basin Street, 2003)
- Platinum (Owl Studios, 2011)
- Speakers in the House (Ropeadope, 2022)

=== As sideman ===
- Betty Davis, They Say I'm Different (Just Sunshine, 1974)
- Eddie Henderson, Heritage (Blue Note, 1976)
- Brand X, Product (Charisma, 1979)
- Brand X, Do They Hurt? (Charisma, 1980)
