= New Zealand Music Award for Critics' Choice Prize =

Annual New Zealand music award

Critics' Choice Prize
- Awarded for: Up-and-coming acts in New Zealand music
- Location: King's Arms Tavern
- Country: New Zealand
- Presented by: Recorded Music New Zealand
- Rewards: $10,000 NZ On Air grant, $2000 music voucher, industry mentoring
- First award: 2010
- Final award: 2016
- Website: nzmusicawards.co.nz/category/events/critics-choice-prize/

The Critics' Choice Prize was a New Zealand Music Awards prize awarded to New Zealand musical artists who were expected to be successful in the music industry in the future. To be eligible for the award, an artist must have neither released a studio album nor have been nominated for a New Zealand Music Award in the past.

The prize was judged by a panel of 13 music-industry critics. The winner was decided at a live event held at the Kings Arms tavern in Auckland. Each of the three shortlisted artists performs, then the judges deliberated and the prize was presented. The prize included a $10,000 NZ On Air grant and mentoring from industry professionals. The prize was first awarded in 2010 to Street Chant and last awarded in 2016 to Scuba Diva. In 2017, Recorded Music New Zealand confirmed that the Critic's Choice Prize would not be awarded that year and the award would be reevaluated.

== Recipients ==
Year	Date	Artist	Other nominees	Ref.
2010	15 September	Street Chant	Home Brew; The Naked and Famous	
2011	6 October	Kimbra	Popstrangers; The Unfaithful Ways	
2012	17 October	Watercolours	Beach Pigs; Loui The Zu	
2013	6 November	Sheep, Dog & Wolf	Janine and the Mixtape; Paquin	
2014	29 October	Randa	Estere; Lake South	
2015	5 November	Bespin	Boycrush; New Gum Sarn	
2016	2 November	Scuba Diva	Kane Strang; Spycc & INF	
2017	No award was presented in 2017			
