= Secrets (Herbie Hancock album) =

Studio album by Herbie Hancock
- Released: August 15, 1976
- Recorded: Wally Heider Studios, San Francisco, CA
- Genre: Jazz fusion, Jazz-funk
- Length: 47:57
- Label: Columbia
- Producer: David Rubinson, Herbie Hancock

Herbie Hancock chronology
Flood (1975)	Secrets (1976)	V.S.O.P. (1977)

Professional ratings
Review scores
Source	Rating
Allmusic	3/5 stars
Rolling Stone	(not rated)
The Rolling Stone Jazz Record Guide	1/5 stars
The Penguin Guide to Jazz Recordings	2.5/4 stars

Secrets is a jazz-funk fusion album by keyboard player Herbie Hancock. It is Hancock's seventeenth album and features saxophonist Bennie Maupin and guitarist Wah Wah Watson.

The album clearly followed from its predecessor Man-Child. As ever, Paul Jackson's basslines were present, and the other regular member Bennie Maupin continued to provide most of the solos alongside Hancock. Man-Child had seen the addition of electric guitar to Hancock's sound, which was retained on Secrets. The rhythm guitar of Motown session musician Wah Wah Watson is a notable feature of the album.

Whereas Man-Child was evenly divided between up-tempo and laid-back tracks, Secrets emphasized the more mellow, softly-rounded mood. Even the more up-tempo tracks, "Doin' It" and "Cantelope Island" (a remake of Hancock's 1964 composition), are suffused with a relaxed Caribbean influence, and overall the album tends towards restrained, rolling grooves rather than overtly high-energy funk. Appropriately, Hancock spent much of his time using the mellow tones of the Fender Rhodes piano, and took advantage of new polyphonic synthesizers to contribute thick pads, foreshadowing ambient music.

Although summery and mellow, there are some extremely abstract and intense sections, particular on the second side; it is also entirely instrumental beside the "Jus' keep on doin' it" chants of the opening track. Subsequent Hancock albums saw the addition of more vocoded lead vocals and disco influences.

The Secrets line-up performed "Spider" (from this LP) and "Hang Up Your Hang-Ups" (from Man-Child) at the V.S.O.P. concert in the summer of 1976.

== Track listing ==
1. "Doin' It" (Herbie Hancock, Melvin Ragin, Ray Parker Jr.) – 8:03
2. "People Music" (Herbie Hancock, Ragin, Paul Jackson) – 7:11
3. "Cantelope Island" [sic] (Hancock) – 7:06
4. "Spider" (Ragin, Hancock, Jackson) – 7:21
5. "Gentle Thoughts" (Hancock, Ragin) – 7:05
6. "Swamp Rat" (Jackson, Hancock, Ragin) – 6:26
7. "Sansho Shima" (Bennie Maupin) – 4:50

== Personnel ==
- Herbie Hancock – acoustic piano, Rhodes electric piano, electric grand piano, ARP Odyssey, ARP String Ensemble, Hohner D6 Clavinet, Micromoog, Oberheim Four Voice, Echoplex
- Bennie Maupin – soprano saxophone, tenor saxophone, saxello, lyricon, bass clarinet
- Wah Wah Watson – guitar, Maestro universal synthesiser system / sample and hold unit, voice bag; vocals & bass on "Doin' It" Co-Producer.
- Ray Parker Jr. – guitar, backing vocals on "Doin' It"
- Paul Jackson – bass
- James Levi – drums
- James Gadson – drums on Doin' It
- Kenneth Nash – percussion, cuíca
