= Takin' Off =

1962 debut album by jazz pianist Herbie Hancock

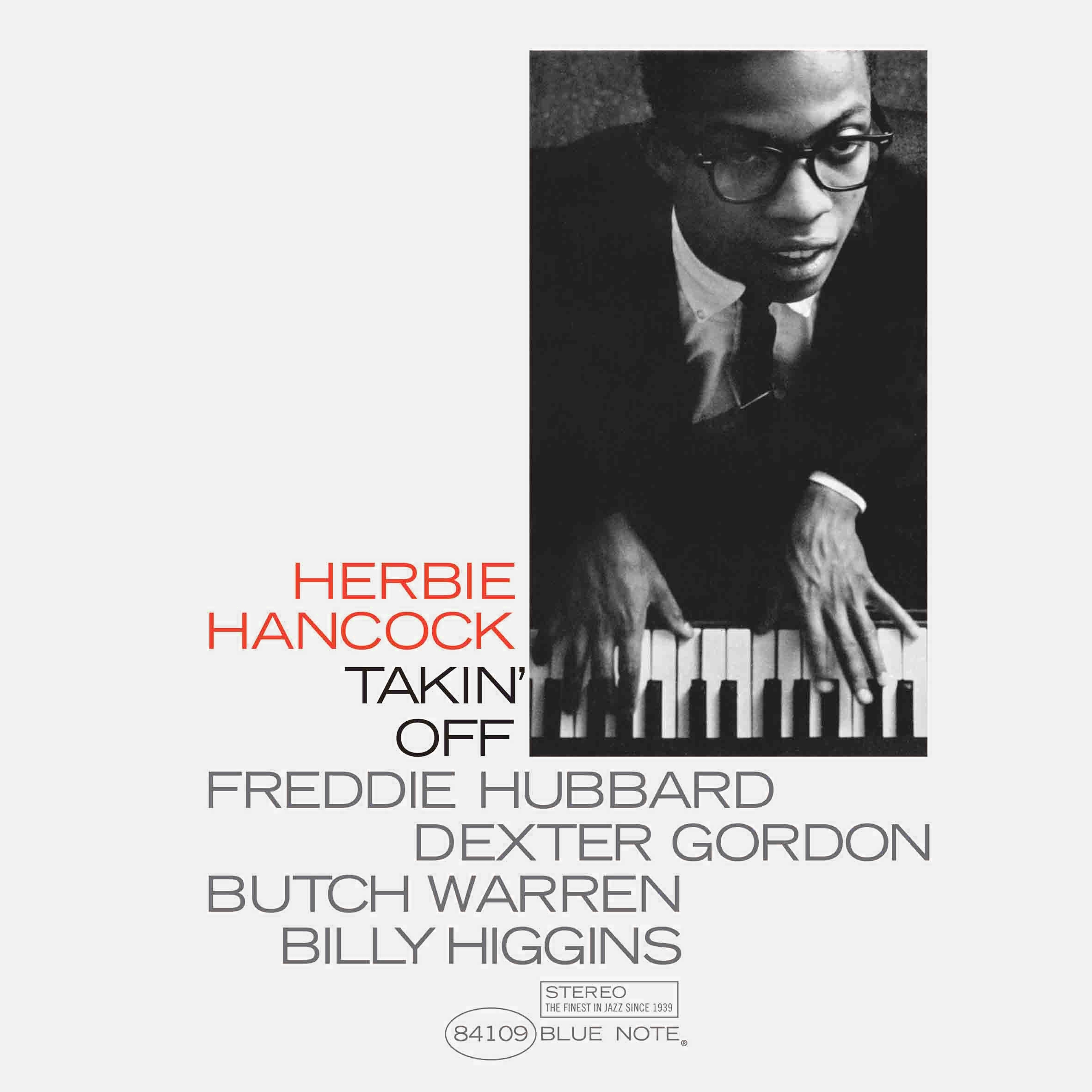

Studio album by Herbie Hancock
- Released: October 1962
- Recorded: May 28, 1962
- Studios: Van Gelder Studio, Englewood Cliffs
- Genres: Soul jazz, hard bop
- Length: 39:01
- Label: Blue Note
- Producer: Alfred Lion

Herbie Hancock chronology
Takin' Off (1962)	My Point of View (1963)

Professional ratings
Review scores
Source	Rating
Allmusic	4.5/5 stars
Down Beat	3.5/5 stars
The Rolling Stone Jazz Record Guide	4/5 stars
The Penguin Guide to Jazz Recordings	3.5/4 stars

Takin' Off is the debut album by jazz pianist Herbie Hancock released in 1962 by Blue Note Records. The album features veteran tenor saxophonist Dexter Gordon, trumpeter Freddie Hubbard, bassist Butch Warren and drummer Billy Higgins. The album is a creative example of music in the hard bop idiom. The bluesy track "Watermelon Man" almost made it into the Top 100 of the singles charts, and went on to become a jazz standard. Hancock released a funk arrangement of “Watermelon Man” on his 1973 album Head Hunters. Takin' Off was initially released on CD in 1996 and then again in remastered form in 2007 by Rudy Van Gelder.

== Track listing ==
All compositions by Herbie Hancock.

Side one

1. "Watermelon Man" – 7:09
2. "Three Bags Full" – 5:27
3. "Empty Pockets" – 6:09

Side two

1. "The Maze" – 6:45
2. "Driftin'" – 6:58
3. "Alone and I" – 6:25

Bonus tracks on CD reissue

7. "Watermelon Man" (alternate take) – 6:33
8. "Three Bags Full" (alternate take) – 5:31
9. "Empty Pockets" (alternate take) – 6:27

== Personnel ==
- Herbie Hancock – piano
- Freddie Hubbard – trumpet, flugelhorn (on 5)
- Dexter Gordon – tenor saxophone
- Butch Warren – double bass
- Billy Higgins – drums
