= Jeannine Rainbolt College of Education =

Educational Institute in Norman

Coordinates: 35°12′20″N 97°26′47″W

The Jeannine Rainbolt College of Education is the education unit of the University of Oklahoma in Norman. As of fall 2005, the school had an enrollment of 639 undergraduates and 777 graduates. The building is also called Collings Hall.

The College of Education began in 1930 under then president William Bennett Bizzell. It was headed by its first dean, Dr. Ellsworth Collings. To this day, the College of Education main offices reside in Collings Hall. Dr. Stacy Reeder is the current dean.

In October 2008 it was announced that the College of Education had received a $8 million gift from H.E. (Gene) Rainbolt in honor of his late wife, Jeannine Rainbolt. Because of that contribution, the OU Board of Regents unanimously voted to rename the college in Rainbolt's honor. It is the only college at OU to be named for a female.

Part of Rainbolt's gift, with other gifts and university funding, was used to pay for a $9.5 million renovation to Collings Hall. Construction, which concluded in summer of 2010, reconstructed the building's facade and add an additional 15,000 feet of classroom space. It was the building's first major building project since 1958.
