= Survival of the Fittest (album) =

Studio album by The Headhunters
- Released: 1975
- Recorded: 1975
- Studios: Wally Heider Studios (San Francisco, California)
- Genres: Jazz-funk; jazz fusion
- Label: Arista
- Producers: David Rubinson; Herbie Hancock

The Headhunters chronology
Survival of the Fittest (1975)	Straight from the Gate (1977)

Survival of the Fittest is the debut album by jazz/funk quintet the Headhunters, released in 1975 on Arista Records. It features the track "God Make Me Funky", from which its drum break has been sampled numerous times by prominent rappers. The album was re-issued on compact disc by BMG France in 2001, which was digitally remastered from the original master tapes in 24-bit by Jean-Pierre Chalbos.

== Track listing ==
All songs by Bennie Maupin, Bill Summers, Paul Jackson, Mike Clark and Blackbird McKnight.

Side One
No.	Title	Length
1.	"God Make Me Funky" (featuring the Pointer Sisters)	9:35
2.	"Mugic"	3:31
3.	"Here and Now"	7:07

Side Two
No.	Title	Length
4.	"Daffy's Dance"	6:05
5.	"Rima"	8:14
6.	"If You've Got It, You'll Get It"	6:26

== Personnel ==
- Blackbyrd McKnight - electric guitar, vocals
- Bennie Maupin - saxophones, vocals, saxello, clarinets, flutes, lyricon, piano
- Paul Jackson - bass guitar, vocals, lead vocals on "God Made Me Funky"
- Mike Clark - drums, vocals
- Bill Summers - percussion, vocals
- Joyce Jackson - flute on "Here and Now," alto flute on "Rima"
- Zak Diouf – djembe
- Baba Duru – bass drum, bells, percussion
- Harvey Mason – percussion
- Pointer Sisters – vocals on "God Made Me Funky"

== Sampling ==
Recordings which have sampled "God Make Me Funky" and other tracks off the album include:

"God Make Me Funky"

- Biz Markie on "Albee Square Mall" (Goin' Off, 1988)
- N.W.A on "Gangsta Gangsta" (Straight Outta Compton, 1988)
- Too poetic - God Made me Funky
- DJ Jazzy Jeff & The Fresh Prince on "As We Go" (He's the DJ, I'm the Rapper, 1988)
- Eric B. & Rakim on "To the Listeners" and "Beats for the Listeners" (Follow The Leader, 1988)
- J. J. Fad on "Let's Get Hyped" (Supersonic, 1988)
- De La Soul on "Take It Off" (3 Feet High and Rising, 1989) and "Pease Porridge" ("De La Soul is Dead", 1991)
- N.W.A on "Sa Prize, Pt. 2" (100 Miles and Runnin' EP, 1990)
- N.W.A on "Approach to Danger" (Niggaz4Life, 1991)
- Prince and the New Power Generation on "To Whom It May Concern" (My Name Is Prince, 1992)
- Digable Planets on "Pacifics" (Reachin' (A New Refutation of Time and Space), 1993) and "Dog It" (Blowout Comb, 1994)
- DMX on "How's It Goin' Down" feat. Faith Evans (It's Dark and Hell Is Hot, 1998)
- Usher on "U-Turn" (8701, 2001)
- Nas on "Hip Hop Is Dead feat. will.i.am" (Hip Hop Is Dead, 2006)

"If You've Got It, You'll Get It"

- Mellow Man Ace on "Talkapella" (Escape from Havana, 1989)
- Boogie Down Productions on "Ruff Ruff" (Sex and Violence, 1992)

"Mugic"

- O.S.T.R. on "Outrostan" (Outro)" (Jazz, dwa, trzy, 2011)
