= Janine Rozier =

French politician (born 1938)

Janine Rozier (born April 13, 1938) is a former member of the Senate of France, who represented the Loiret department from 2001 to 2011. She is a member of the Union for a Popular Movement.
