= The Headhunters =

American jazz fusion band

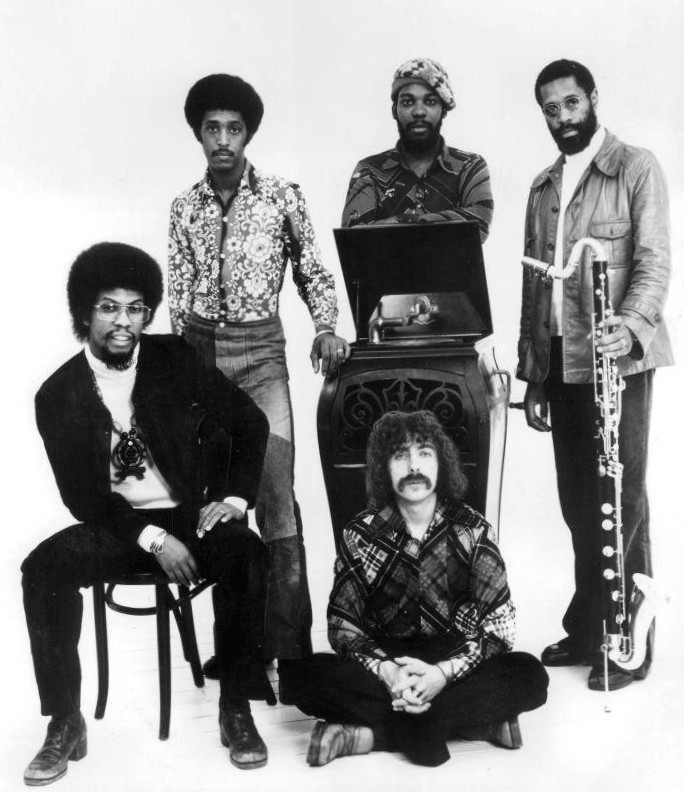
- Herbie Hancock and The Headhunters in 1975

Background information
- Origin: United States of America
- Genres: Jazz fusion
- Years active: 1973–present
- Labels: Columbia, Verve Forecast, Basin Street, P-Vine, Owl Studios
- Members: Mike Clark; Bill Summers
- Past members: Herbie Hancock; Bennie Maupin; Paul Jackson; Harvey Mason; DeWayne McKnight; Wah Wah Watson

The Headhunters is an American jazz fusion band formed by Herbie Hancock in 1973. The group fuses jazz, funk, and rock music.

== History and band name ==
Hancock had grown dissatisfied with his prior band, Mwandishi, and wanted to make a band with a stronger funk component. He chose the name of the group, "Headhunters", while doing Buddhist chanting. The name pleased him because it made a triple reference to the jungle, to intellectual concerns, and to sexual activity.

In 1973, the band comprised Hancock (keyboards), Bennie Maupin (saxophone, clarinet), Harvey Mason (drums), Paul Jackson (bass), and Bill Summers (percussion). Their first album, Head Hunters, sold more than one million copies.

After releasing three studio albums together, Hancock departed to pursue other projects, and the band carried on without him with his blessing. Hancock has occasionally returned for one-off projects with the group.

== Discography ==
| Year | Album | Label | Peak chart positions | | |
| Year | Album | Label | US | US Jazz (Trad) | US Jazz (Cont) |
|---|---|---|---|---|---|
| 1973 | Head Hunters (Herbie Hancock album) | Columbia | 21 | — | — |
| 1974 | Thrust (Herbie Hancock album) | Columbia | — | — | — |
| 1975 | Flood (live album with Herbie Hancock) | CBS/Sony | — | — | — |
| 1975 | Man-Child (Herbie Hancock album) | Columbia | — | — | — |
| 1975 | Survival of the Fittest | Arista | 126 | 12 | — |
| 1977 | Straight from the Gate | Arista | — | — | — |
| 1998 | Return of the Headhunters! (with Herbie Hancock) | Verve | — | — | 9 |
| 2003 | Evolution Revolution | Basin Street | — | — | — |
| 2008 | On Top: Live From Europe | BHM Productions | — | — | — |
| 2011 | Platinum | Owl Studios | — | — | — |
| 2022 | Speakers In The House | Ropeadope | — | — | — |
| 2023 | Live from Brooklyn Bowl | Ropeadope | — | — | — |
| 2024 | The Stunt Man | Ropeadope | — | — | — |
| | "—" denotes releases that did not chart | | | | |
