= Man-Child =

Studio album by Herbie Hancock
- Released: August 22, 1975
- Recorded: 1974–75
- Studios: Wally Heider Studios, San Francisco; Village Recorders, Los Angeles; Funky Features, San Francisco; Crystal Studios, Los Angeles
- Genres: Jazz-funk, jazz fusion
- Length: 45:20
- Label: Columbia
- Producers: David Rubinson, Herbie Hancock

Herbie Hancock chronology
| Death Wish (1974) | Man-Child (1975) | Flood (1975) |

Professional ratings
Review scores
| Source | Rating |
|---|---|
| AllMusic | 3/5 stars |
| The Penguin Guide to Jazz Recordings | 3/4 stars |
| The Rolling Stone Jazz Record Guide | 2/5 stars |

Man-Child is the fifteenth studio album by jazz pianist Herbie Hancock. The record was released on August 22, 1975, by Columbia Records. It was the final studio album to feature the Headhunters, and a number of guest musicians including saxophonist Wayne Shorter, a full brass section, three different guitarists (including DeWayne McKnight), and Stevie Wonder on harmonica.

== Overview ==
It is arguably one of his most funk-influenced albums and it represents his further departure from the "spacey, higher atmosphere jazz," as he referred to it, of his earlier career. Hancock uses more funk-based rhythms around the hi-hat, and snare drum. The tracks are characterized by short, repeated riffs by both the rhythm section, horns accompaniment, and basslines. Man-Child features less improvisation from the whole band and more concentrated grooves with brief solos from the horns and Hancock himself on synthesizer and Fender Rhodes piano on top of the repeated riffs. This album features the addition of electric guitar to his new sound, which he started only five years prior to this album with Fat Albert Rotunda. The guitarists featured on this album were Melvin "Wah-Wah Watson" Ragin, DeWayne "Blackbyrd" McKnight and David T. Walker. Their extensive use of wah-wah pedal and accenting chords on the up-beat rather than the down-beat is what helps to give the album a distinct and funkier rhythm that is broken up by brief periods of stop-time where only the sustained chords are heard from the electric guitar with an open wah pedal. The riffs are fast-paced and energetic with repeating patterns that combine with multiple voices (i.e. horns, piano, bass, synthesizer, guitar, and drums and percussion). The horn section in "Hang Up Your Hang-Ups" plays repeated riffs in unison that alternate with and are answered by electric piano, synthesizer, and electric guitar in brief periods of call and response.

Paul Jackson, Bill Summers, Harvey Mason, Bennie Maupin, and Mike Clark (who replaced Harvey Mason post-1974) formed the core of the group the Headhunters with which Hancock had toured and recorded for the previous three years. This was their final album as a group.

== Track listing ==
Side A
| No. | Title | Writer(s) | Length |
|---|---|---|---|
| 1. | "Hang Up Your Hang Ups" | Herbie Hancock, Melvin Ragin, Paul Jackson | 7:29 |
| 2. | "Sun Touch" | Hancock | 5:12 |
| 3. | "The Traitor" | Hancock, Ragin, Louis Johnson, Wayne Shorter | 9:38 |
| Total length: | | | 22:19 |

Side B
| No. | Title | Writer(s) | Length |
|---|---|---|---|
| 4. | "Bubbles" | Hancock, Ragin | 9:03 |
| 5. | "Steppin' in It" | Hancock | 8:42 |
| 6. | "Heartbeat" | Hancock, Ragin, Jackson | 5:16 |
| Total length: | | | 23:01 |

== Personnel ==
- Herbie Hancock – acoustic piano, Fender Rhodes electric piano, Hohner D6 clavinet, ARP Odyssey, ARP Pro Soloist, ARP 2600, and ARP String Ensemble synthesizers, Oberheim Polyphonic synthesizer
- Bud Brisbois – trumpet
- Jay DaVersa – trumpet
- Garnett Brown – trombone
- Dick Hyde – tuba, bass trombone
- Wayne Shorter – soprano saxophone
- Bennie Maupin – soprano and tenor saxophones, saxello, bass clarinet, bass and alto flutes
- Jim Horn – saxophones and flutes
- Ernie Watts – saxophones and flutes
- Dewayne McKnight, David T. Walker – guitar
- Wah Wah Watson – guitar, voice bag, Maestro Universal Synthesizer System, Maestro Sample and Hold Unit
- Henry E. Davis – bass guitar
- Paul Jackson – bass guitar
- Louis Johnson – bass guitar
- Mike Clark – drums
- James Gadson – drums
- Harvey Mason – drums
- Stevie Wonder – harmonica
- Bill Summers – percussion
