= Jeannine =

Jeannine is a given name. Notable people with the name include:

- Jeannine Altmeyer (born 1948), American operatic soprano
- Jeannine Baticle (1920–2014), French curator
- Jeannine Burch (born 1968), Swiss television actress
- Jeannine Davis-Kimball (1929–2017), American archaeologist
- Jeannine Edwards (sportscaster), American sportscaster who works for ESPN
- Jeannine Garside (born 1978), rising star in women's boxing
- Jeannine Gramick (born 1942), Roman Catholic nun, co-founder of New Ways Ministry
- Jeannine Hall Gailey (born 1973), American poet
- Jeannine Oppewall (born 1946), American film art director
- Jeannine Parvati Baker (1949–2005), Yogini, midwife, herbalist, published author, and poet
- Jeannine Phillips, beauty queen from Lisbon, Connecticut; competed in Miss USA pageant
- Jeannine Savard, poet from New York state

== See also ==
- École Active Bilingue Jeannine Manuel (EABJM) is a private school in Paris, France
- Jeannine Rainbolt College of Education, the education unit of the University of Oklahoma in Norman
- Jeanine
- Janine (disambiguation)
