= Jeanine =

Jeanine is a feminine given name. Notable people with the name include:

- Jeanine Áñez (born 1967), Bolivian politician and lawyer who served as Interim President of Bolivia from 2019 to 2020
- Jeanine Bapst (born 1968), Swiss ski mountaineer
- Jeanine Basinger (born 1936), Corwin-Fuller Professor of Film Studies at Wesleyan University, Middletown, Connecticut
- Jeanine Belkhodja (1928–2013), Algerian doctor and activist
- Jeanine Cicognini (born 1986), badminton player
- Jeanine Corbet, American filmmaker
- Jeanine Delpech (1905–1992), French journalist, translator, novelist
- Jeanine Dubié (born 1958), French politician
- Jeanine Hennis-Plasschaert (born 1973), Dutch politician and former management consultant and civil servant
- Jeanine Assani Issouf (born 1992), French triple jumper
- Jeanine Leane (born 1961), Wiradjuri Aboriginal poet and academic
- Jeanine Mason (born 1991), American dancer and winner of So You Think You Can Dance 2009
- Jeanine Meerapfel (born 1943), German film director and screenwriter
- Jeanine Menze the first African-American female in the United States Coast Guard to earn the Coast Guard Aviation Designation
- Jeanine Nibizi, Burundian politician
- Jeanine Perry, former member of the Ohio House of Representatives, succeeded by Matt Szollosi
- Jeanine Pirro (born 1951), American lawyer, prosecutor, TV host, former Judge, and politician from the state of New York
- Jeanine Rueff (1922–1999), French composer and music educator
- Jeanine Sobek (born 1972), American ice hockey player
- Jeanine Tesori (formerly known as Jeanine Levenson), a composer of musicals

== Fictional characters ==
- Jeanine Stifler, aka Stifler's Mom, in the American Pie film series

== Other uses ==
- A brand name of a medication containing ethinylestradiol and dienogest

== See also ==
- Jeanine Nicarico murder case, homicide investigation and prosecution in DuPage County, Illinois
- Jeannine
- Janine (given name)
- Jeananne
