= Wah Wah Watson =

American guitarist (1950–2018)

- Born: Melvin M. Ragin; December 8, 1950; Richmond, Virginia, U.S.
- Died: October 24, 2018 (aged 67) Santa Monica, California, U.S.
- Genres: R&B, soul, funk
- Occupation: Musician
- Instrument: Guitar
- Years active: 1968–2018
- Formerly of: Funk Brothers
- Website: wahwah.com

Melvin M. Ragin (December 8, 1950 – October 24, 2018), known professionally as Wah Wah Watson, was an American guitarist who was a member of the Funk Brothers, the studio band for Motown Records. He also worked extensively as a session musician in a variety of genres from jazz and pop to R&B.

== Career ==
Ragin was a native of Richmond, Virginia. His father, Robert Ragin, was a minister, and his mother, Cora (Brown) Ragin was an evangelist. She bought him his first guitar when he was 15.

He moved to Detroit in the 1960s and eventually became a member of the Motown Records studio band the Funk Brothers, where he recorded with artists like The Temptations (his guitar work on "Papa Was a Rollin' Stone" is particularly notable), the Jackson 5, the Four Tops, Gladys Knight & the Pips, and the Supremes. He played on numerous sessions in the 1970s and 1980s for many top soul, funk and disco acts, including Herbie Hancock; he both recorded and composed songs with the Pointer Sisters. His nickname stemmed from "wonderfully textured sounds" he conjured using a wah-wah pedal to alter the sound of his electric guitar; he bought his first pedal after hearing Motown studio guitarist Dennis Coffey use one.

From 1974-1980 Melvin Ragin worked extensively with Herbie Hancock, on the Secrets recording, track 1 had Wah Watson on Bass & voice bag with his friend Ray Parker Jr. on Guitar. That 1976 recording was co-produced by Wah Wah Watson.

When Motown relocated to Los Angeles, so did Ragin. In 1976, Watson released his first solo album, Elementary, on Columbia Records. The album was co-produced by Watson and David Rubinson.

In 1994, Watson appeared on the Red Hot Organization's compilation album, Stolen Moments: Red Hot + Cool. The album, meant to raise awareness and funds in support of the AIDS epidemic in relation to the African American community, was heralded as "Album of the Year" by Time magazine. In the 2000s, Watson appeared on the albums Maxwell's Now (2001), Black Diamond (2000) by Angie Stone, the soundtrack to the film Shaft (2000), Damita Jo (2004) by Janet Jackson, Alicia Keys' Unplugged (2005), and The Element of Freedom (2009). In 2010, Wah Wah Watson collaborated with alternative soul artist Res to create the song, "For Who You Are" on the Black Girls Rock album. The song is frequently played as a classic Chicago, Illinois "stepping" dance song with over 10 million views on youtube.

== Death ==
Watson died on October 24, 2018, at St. John's Hospital in Santa Monica. He was 67. He was survived by two sisters, two brothers, and his wife, Itsuko Aono. In a statement, Aono said, "Wherever he is, he’s groovin’.”

== Discography ==
=== As leader ===
- Elementary (1976)

=== As sideman ===
With Herbie Hancock

- Death Wish (soundtrack) (1974)
- Man-Child (1975)
- Secrets (1976)
- VSOP (1977)
- Feets, Don't Fail Me Now (1979)
- Monster (1980)
- Mr. Hands (1980)
- Dis Is Da Drum (1994)

With others

- The Beach Boys, L.A. (Light Album) (1979)
- George Benson, Love Remembers (1993)
- George Benson, Songs and Stories (2009)
- Yung Berg, Look What You Made Me (2008)
- Blondie, Autoamerican (1980)
- Donald Byrd, Thank You...For F.U.M.L. (Funking Up My Life) (Elektra, 1978)
- Cher, Take Me Home (1979)
- Four Tops, Nature Planned It (1972)
- Marvin Gaye, Let's Get It On (1973)
- Gloria Gaynor, "I Will Survive" (1978)
- Dizzy Gillespie, Free Ride (1977)
- John Lee Hooker, Free Beer and Chicken (1974)
- Thelma Houston, Ride to the Rainbow (1979)
- Bobbi Humphrey, Satin Doll (1974)
- Janet Jackson, Damita Jo (2004)
- Michael Jackson, Off the Wall (1979)
- Michael Jackson Bad (1987)
- The Jackson 5, ABC (1970)
- Quincy Jones, Body Heat (1974)
- Quincy Jones I Heard That!! (1976)
- Quincy Jones, Q's Jook Joint (1995)
- Illya Kuryaki and the Valderramas, Versus (1997)
- Labelle, Chameleon (1976)
- Maysa Leak, Out of the Blue (2002)
- Love Unlimited, Under the Influence of... (1973)
- The Love Unlimited Orchestra, Rhapsody in White (1974)
- Maxwell, Maxwell's Urban Hang Suite (1994)
- Maxwell, Now (2001)
- Brian McKnight, Brian McKnight (1992)
- Brian McKnight, I Remember You (1995)
- Meshell Ndegeocello, Plantation Lullabies (1993)
- Meshell Ndegeocello, Peace Beyond Passion (1996)
- The Supremes, High Energy (1976)
- Pointer Sisters, Steppin' (1975)
- Martha Reeves, Martha Reeves (1974)
- Rose Royce, Car Wash (1976)
- Boz Scaggs, Slow Dancer (1974)
- The Temptations, All Directions (1972)
- The Temptations, Masterpiece (1973)
- Tyrese, Black Rose (2015)
- The Undisputed Truth, The Undisputed Truth (1971)
- Vanessa L. Williams The Comfort Zone (1991)
- Stevie Wonder, Conversation Peace (1995)
