= Janine (singer) =

New Zealand singer

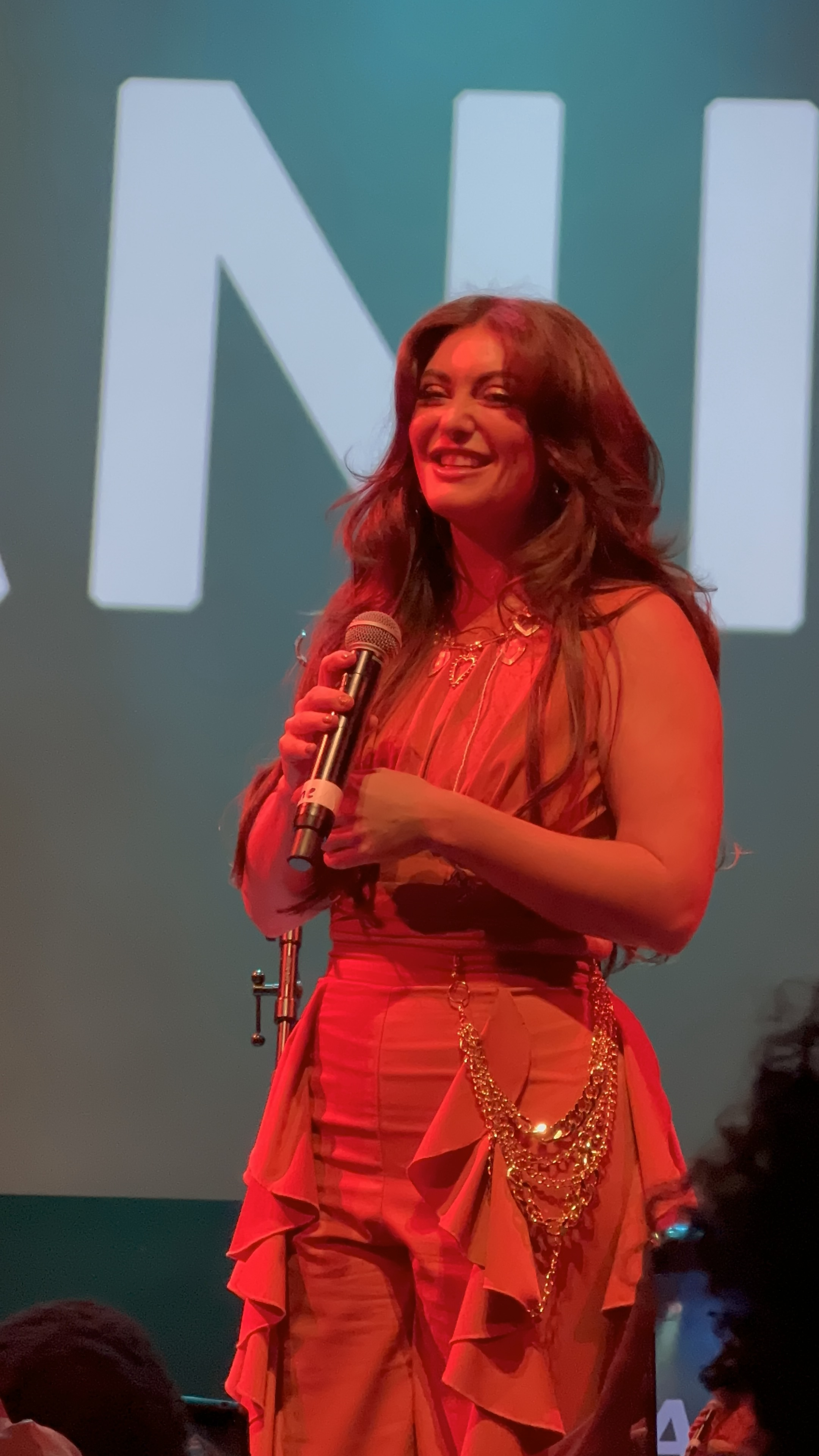
Janine Foster Performing at the Howard Theater during the 2025 Pain and Paradise Tour.

Janine Foster, known professionally as Janine, is a New Zealand-born R&B singer, songwriter, and producer. Janine previously performed under the stage name Janine and the Mixtape but changed her stage name to Janine to reflect her sense of growth as an artist. Born in Auckland, Janine began singing at open mics at the age of 14. The New Zealand Music Commission characterised Janine as one of the country's "most accomplished and successful musical exports".

== Musical Career ==
Janine first gained notoriety in 2014 after her song, "Hold Me," was featured on an episode of Love & Hip-Hop: Atlanta. That same year, Janine's debut extended play, Dark Mind EP, reached the number two spot on the iTunes R&B album chart. The commercial success of "Hold Me" led to a "bidding war" between multiple U.S. music labels seeking to sign her.

In 2015, Janine won the Best Urban / Hip Hop Album award at the New Zealand Music Awards. Janine was also nominated for a New Zealand Music Award for Critics' Choice Prize.

Janine is currently an independent artist but was previously signed to Atlantic Records.

== Musical Influences ==
Janine cites Mariah Carey, Aaliyah, Craig David, Usher, Monica, Brandy, Ashanti, Janet Jackson, and Celine Dion as musical influences.

== Discography ==
=== Studio Albums ===
- Pain and Paradise (2025)
- 99 (2018)

=== Extended Plays ===
- XXEP (2015)
- Dark Mind EP (2014)
