= Chameleon (composition) =

Instrumental by Herbie Hancock

from the album Head Hunters
- Released: 1973
- Recorded: September 1973
- Genre: Funk, jazz-funk
- Length: 15:41
- Label: Columbia
- Composers: Herbie Hancock; Paul Jackson; Harvey Mason; Bennie Maupin
- Producers: Herbie Hancock; David Rubinson

"Chameleon" is a jazz fusion standard composed by Herbie Hancock with Bennie Maupin, Paul Jackson and Harvey Mason, all of whom also performed the original 15:44 full-length version on the 1973 album Head Hunters, and featuring solos by Hancock and Maupin.

== Background ==
The song has a characteristic bass line and is set to a funk beat. For the most part, it is built entirely on a two-chord vamp: a i–IV in B♭ Dorian (B♭m7 and E♭7). The piece's signature 12-note bass line was played by Hancock on an ARP Odyssey, as was one of the keyboard solos. The other keyboard solo was played on a Rhodes piano.

== Chart performance ==
Chart (1974)	Peak position
US Billboard Hot 100	42
US Billboard Hot Soul Singles	18

== Other recordings ==
The piece is one of the most widely recognized jazz standards, and has become standard repertoire in many small jazz ensembles. It has been performed by various artists including:

- Maceo Parker
- Buddy Rich
- Stanley Jordan
- Big Sam's Funky Nation
- Maynard Ferguson
- Eddie Jefferson
- Gov't Mule
- Jazz Warriors
- Monty Alexander with Sly Dunbar & Robbie Shakespeare
- Michał Urbaniak
- The String Cheese Incident
- Umphrey's McGee
- James Morrison
