= Paul Jackson (bassist) =

American jazz musician (1947–2021)

- Born: March 28, 1947; Oakland, California, U.S.
- Died: March 18, 2021 (aged 73) Tokyo, Japan
- Genres: Jazz, jazz-funk, jazz fusion, funk
- Occupation(s): Musician, composer
- Instrument: Bass guitar
- Formerly of: The Headhunters, Azteca, Santana
- Website: Official website

Paul Jerome Jackson Jr. (March 28, 1947 – March 18, 2021) was an American jazz electric bassist and composer. He was a founding member of the Headhunters and played on several of Herbie Hancock's albums, including Head Hunters and Thrust. Jackson subsequently moved to Japan and started a voluntary concert called Jazz for Kids, with the intent of familiarizing students there with African-American history.

== Early life ==
Jackson was born in Oakland, California, on March 28, 1947. He was one of four children of Paul Sr. and Rosa Emanuel. His father was initially a heavyweight boxer, who subsequently worked as a contractor and was occasionally employed as a security guard at music venues. Jackson played piano and bassoon as a child, in addition to his primary instrument of bass, which he started playing when he was nine years old. At the age of 14, he performed with the Oakland Symphony Orchestra and went on to study at the San Francisco Conservatory of Music.

== Career ==
Jackson was a founding member of the Headhunters. The group was established in 1973 by Herbie Hancock and also featured Bennie Maupin on saxophone and clarinet, Harvey Mason on drums, and Bill Summers playing percussion. Their first album, self-titled Head Hunters, was released that same year. It became the best-selling jazz album of all time when it was released, selling over a million copies (the first jazz album to do so) and peaking at number 13 on the Billboard 200 chart. Jackson co-wrote "Chameleon", the album's lead track that later became a jazz standard. He subsequently played on Thrust (1974), Man-Child (1975), the live album Flood (1975) and Secrets (1976). Another two albums were released by the group but were performed and recorded without Hancock: Survival of the Fittest (1975) and Straight from the Gate (1977). In the former, Jackson co-wrote "God Make Me Funky" and sang its lead vocals. He went on to release his first solo album, Black Octopus, in 1978. It featured his bandmates Hancock and Maupin.

== Later life ==
Jackson resided in Japan from 1985 until his death. There, he became involved in its music scene. He wrote and arranged music for television advertisements and movies. He also performed with local artists such as Char, Tsutomu Yamashita, and Sadao Watanabe. Jackson established Jazz for Kids in 1987; this was a voluntary concert performed in schools around the country with the goal of familiarizing students with African-American history via music and presentation. He visited over 80 schools for this endeavor, and a documentary was produced by the Ministry of Education, Culture, Sports, Science and Technology covering his band.

Jackson released his second solo album, Funk on a Stick, in 2005. Nine years later, he collaborated with Xantoné Blacq and Tony Match – under the moniker "Paul Jackson Trio" – to release Groove or Die. Jackson stopped touring in 2016 due to unspecified health concerns.

== Personal life ==
Jackson's first marriage ended in divorce. He had one son from that marriage, LaFura Eguchi Jackson, who was born in 1975 and died of cancer in 2000. Jackson's second marriage was to Akiko Suzuki. They remained married until his death.

Jackson died on March 18, 2021, ten days before his 74th birthday, at a hospital near Tokyo, Japan. He had suffered from sepsis caused by complications from diabetes prior to his death.

== Discography ==
=== As leader ===
- Black Octopus (Eastworld, 1978)
- The Funk Stops Here with Mike Clark (Tiptoe, 1992)
- Conjunction with Mike Clark (Buckyball, 2001)
- Funk on a Stick (Back Door, 2005)
- Groove or Die (Whirlwind, 2014)

=== As sideman ===
With Herbie Hancock

- Head Hunters (Columbia, 1973)
- Thrust (Columbia, 1974)
- Death Wish (Columbia, 1974)
- Man-Child (Columbia, 1975)
- Flood (Sony, 1975)
- Secrets (Columbia, 1976)
- VSOP (Columbia, 1976)
- Sunlight (Columbia, 1978)
- Direct Step (Sony, 1979)
- Kimiko Kasai, Butterfly (Sony, 1979)
- Mr. Hands (Columbia, 1980)

With the Headhunters

- Survival of the Fittest (Arista, 1975)
- Straight from the Gate (Arista, 1977)
- Return of the Headhunters (Verve, 1998)
- Evolution Revolution (Basin Street, 2003)
- Rebecca Barry & The Headhunters (LMF, 2005)

With others

- Azar Lawrence – People Moving (Prestige, 1976)
- Azteca – Azteca (CBS, 1972)
- Eddie Henderson – Heritage (Blue Note, 1976), Comin' Through (Capitol, 1977), Mahal (Capitol, 1978)
- Harvey Mason – Marching in the Street (Arista, 1975)
- Bennie Maupin – Slow Traffic to the Right (Mercury, 1977)
- The Pointer Sisters – Steppin' (Blue Thumb, 1975)
- Sonny Rollins – Easy Living (Prestige, 1977)
- Santana – Festival (CBS, 1977)
- Shawn Phillips – Spaced (A&M Records, 1977)
- Stanley Turrentine – Everybody Come On Out (Fantasy, 1976)
- Stomu Yamashta – Go Too (Arista, 1977)

== Sources ==
- Jazz Times, Volume 37, Issues 1-5. 2007 p. 297
- Yanow, Scott. Jazz: A Regional Exploration. Greenwood Publishing Group, 2005, p. 231. ISBN 0-313-32871-4
